= BAP Diez Canseco =

At least two ships of the Peruvian Navy have been named BAP Diez Canseco:

- BAP Diez Canseco (1960), was an Auk-class minesweeper launched in 1944 as USS Shoveler she was transferred to Peru in 1960
- BAP Diez Canseco (DD-79), was a Friesland-class destroyer launched in 1956 as HNLMS Rotterdam she was transferred to Peru in 1981 serving until being decommissioned in 1991
