= BAP Castilla =

At least two ships of the Peruvian Navy have been named BAP Castilla:

- BAP Castilla (D-2), was a Cannon-class destroyer escort launched in 1943 as USS Banquest she was transferred to Peru in 1951 serving until being scrapped in 1979
- BAP Castilla (DD-71), was a Friesland-class destroyer launched in 1956 as HNLMS Utrecht she was transferred to Peru in 1980 serving until being decommissioned in 1990
