= BAP Gálvez =

At least three ships of the Peruvian Navy have been named BAP Gálvez or BAP Teniente Gálvez:

- BAP Teniente Gálvez (F-1), was a Tacoma-class frigate launched in 1943 as USS Woonsocket she was transferred to Peru in 1948 named initially as Teniente Gálvez and subsequently Gálvez. She was stricken in 1961.
- BAP Gálvez (1960), was an Auk-class minesweeper launched in 1944 as USS Ruddy she was transferred to Peru in 1960. In 1975 she was transferred to the Peruvian Coast guard
- BAP Gálvez (DD-78), was a Friesland-class destroyer launched in 1954 as HNLMS Groningen she was transferred to Peru in 1981 serving until being decommissioned in 1991
