= Utrecht (disambiguation) =

Utrecht is a city in the Netherlands.

Utrecht may also refer to:

- Utrecht (agglomeration), including the city of Utrecht
- Utrecht (province), of which the city of Utrecht is the capital

In history:

- Lordship of Utrecht, precursor of the province
- Episcopal principality of Utrecht, precursor of the lordship
- Archdiocese of Utrecht (695–1580), historic diocese and precursor of the bishopric

Outside the Netherlands:

- Utrecht, KwaZulu-Natal, a South African village named after the Dutch city
- Republic of Utrecht, named after the village
- New Utrecht, Brooklyn, named after the Dutch city

Other uses:

- Roman Catholic Archdiocese of Utrecht, current diocese of Utrecht
- Old Catholic Archdiocese of Utrecht
- Union of Utrecht, treaty signed in 1579, regarded as the foundation of the Dutch Republic
- Union of Utrecht (Old Catholic), a federation of Old Catholic Churches
- Treaty of Utrecht, series of treaties signed in 1713, helped ending the War of the Spanish Succession
- Utrecht University
- FC Utrecht, a Dutch Association football club
- Utrecht Art Supplies, a vendor of fine art materials, based in New Jersey
- Utrecht Caravaggism, a group of painters of the Baroque school in the early part of the seventeenth century
- Utrecht Centraal railway station
- HNLMS Utrecht, several ships of the Royal Netherlands Navy
