= HNLMS Utrecht =

HNLMS Utrecht (Dutch: Hr.Ms. or Zr.Ms. Utrecht) may refer to following ships of the Royal Netherlands Navy:

- HNLMS Utrecht (1898), a Holland-class protected cruiser
- HNLMS Utrecht (D817), a Friesland-class destroyer
