= HNLMS Limburg =

Destroyer of the Friesland class

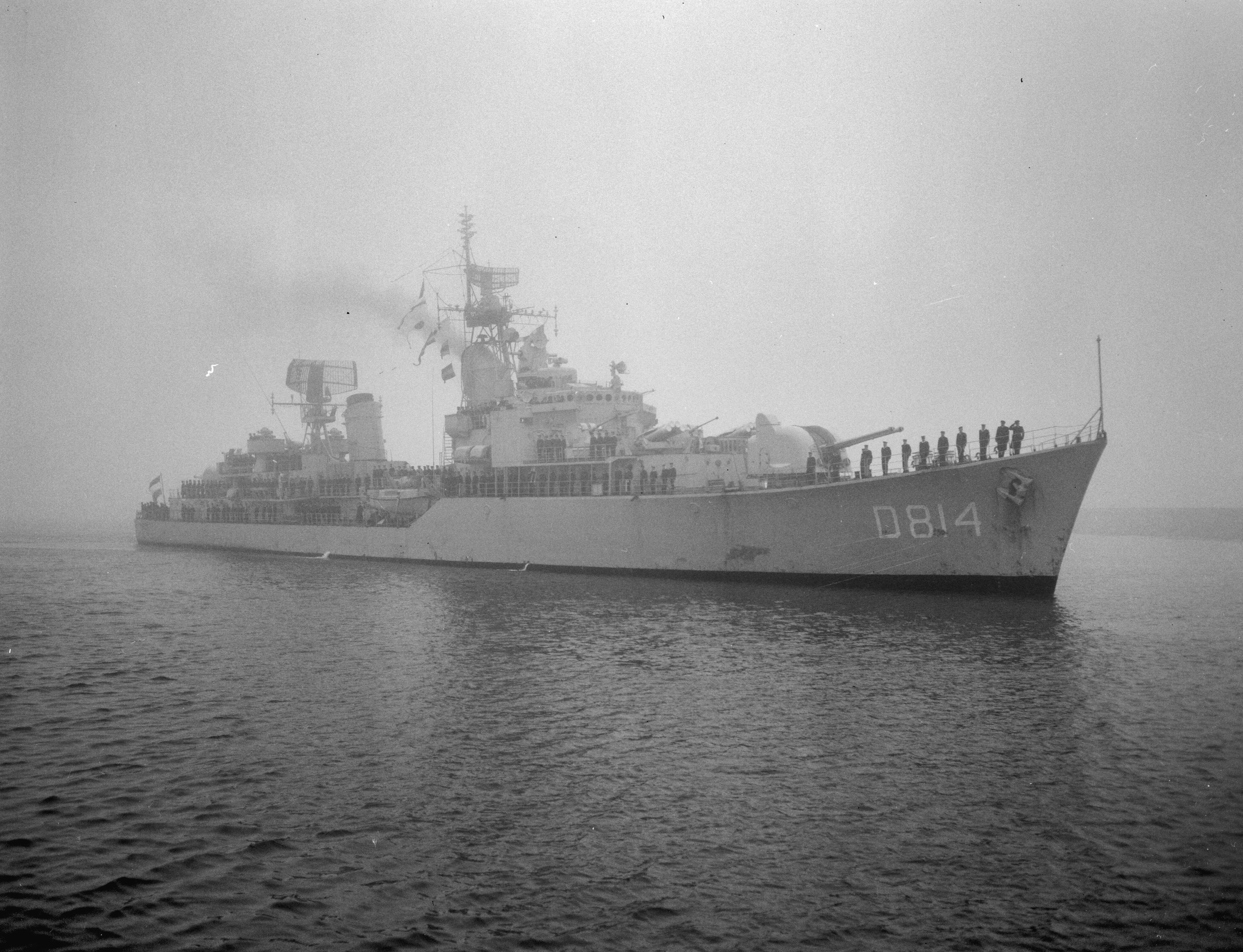
- Limburg

History

Netherlands
- Name: Limburg
- Namesake: Limburg
- Builder: KM de Schelde, Vlissingen
- Laid down: 28 November 1953
- Launched: 5 September 1955
- Commissioned: 31 October 1956
- Decommissioned: 1 February 1980
- Fate: Sold to the Peruvian Navy

Peru
- Name: Capitan Quiñones
- Acquired: 1980
- Decommissioned: 1991
- Identification: DD76
- Status: decommissioned

General characteristics
- Type: Friesland-class destroyer
- Displacement: 2497 standard, 3070 tons full load
- Length: 116 m (381 ft)
- Beam: 11.7 m (38 ft)
- Draught: 5.2 m (17 ft)
- Propulsion: 2 shaft geared turbines, 4 BW boilers, Super-heated steam @ 620psi, 60,000 hp
- Speed: 36 kn (67 km/h; 41 mph)
- Range: 4,000 nmi (7,400 km; 4,600 mi) at 18 kn (33 km/h; 21 mph)
- Complement: 284
- Sensors & processing systems: Radar LW-02, DA-01, ZW-01, M45, Sonar Type PAE 1N, Type CWE 10
- Armament: 4 × Bofors 120 mm guns (2 × 2); 6 × 40mm Bofors AA guns (6 × 1); 8 × 375 mm anti submarine mortars (2 × 4); 2 × depth charge racks

HNLMS Limburg (D814) (Dutch: Hr.Ms. Limburg) was a destroyer of the Friesland class. The ship was in service with the Royal Netherlands Navy from 1956 to 1980. The destroyer was named after the Dutch province of Limburg and was the first ship with this name. In 1980 the ship was taken out of service and sold to Peru where it was renamed Capitan Quiñones. The ship's radio call sign was "PATM".

== Dutch service history ==
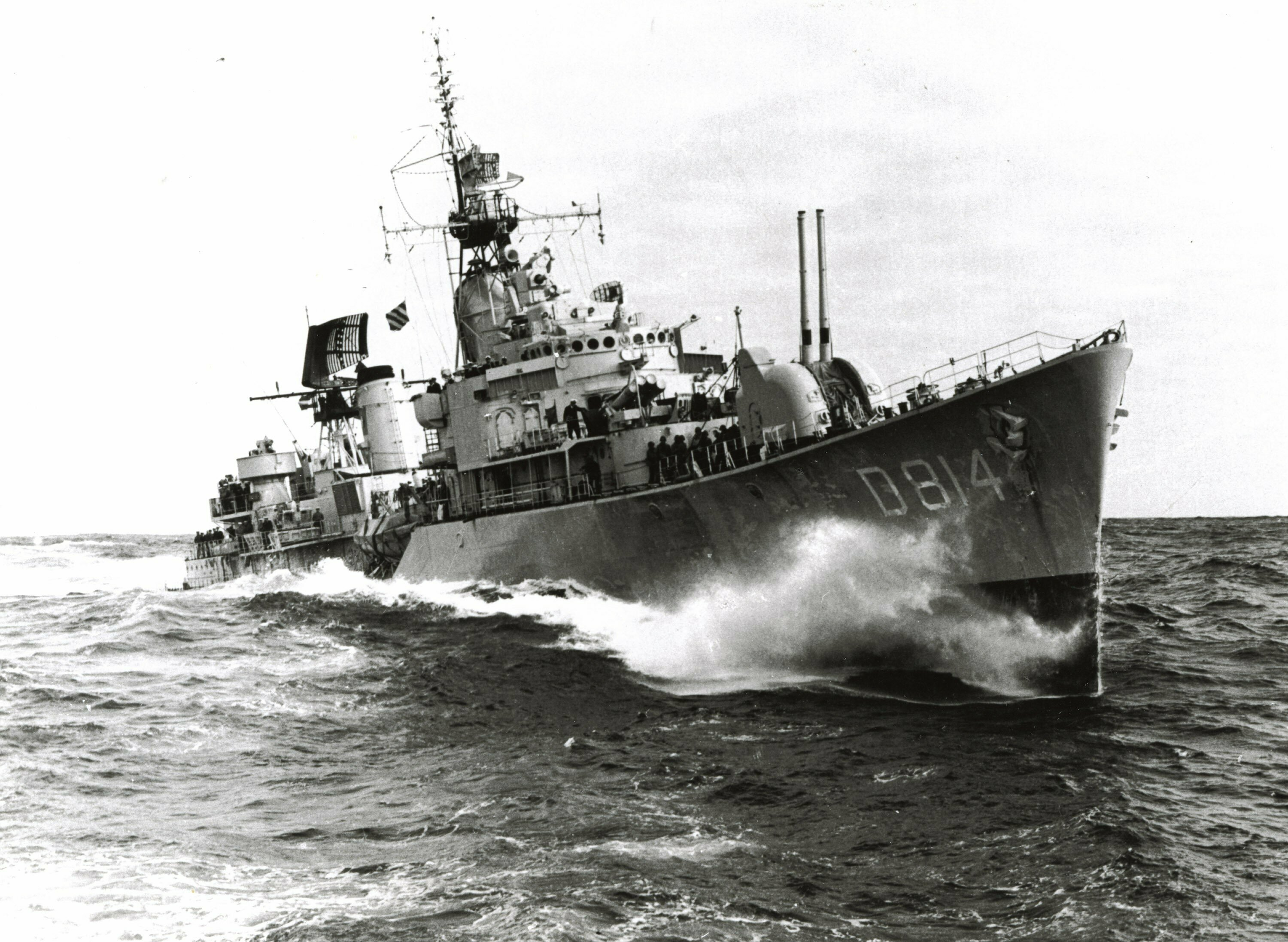
Limburg in 1967

HNLMS Limburg was one of eight Friesland-class destroyers and was built at the KM de Schelde in Vlissingen. The keel laying took place on 28 November 1953 and the launching on 5 September 1955. The ship was put into service on 31 October 1956.

Across the Channel in the United Kingdom, the appointment of Commander-in-Chief, The Nore lapsed on 31 March 1961. Seven days before, a closing ceremony took place, on 24 March 1961. At the ceremony, the station's Queen's Colour was formally laid up in the presence of members of the Admiralty Board, several former Commanders-in-Chief, other civilian and military figures, "..and the Commander-in-Chief of the Netherlands Home Station flying his flag in the new Dutch destroyer Limburg who had been invited to attend."

In 1962 during the West New Guinea dispute Limburg attacked Indonesian planes during the defense of Netherlands New Guinea.

On 1 February 1980 the vessel was decommissioned and sold to the Peruvian Navy.

== Peruvian service history ==
The ship was put into service on 27 June 1980 where the ship was renamed Capitan Quiñones and decommissioned in 1991.

== Bibliography ==
- Scheina, Robert L. & Smigielski, Adam (1995). "Peru". In Chumbley, Stephen (ed.). Conway's All the World's Fighting Ships, 1947–1995 (revised ed.). Naval Institute Press. pp. 303–307. ISBN 1-55750-132-7.
