= Nederlandsche Dok en Scheepsbouw Maatschappij =

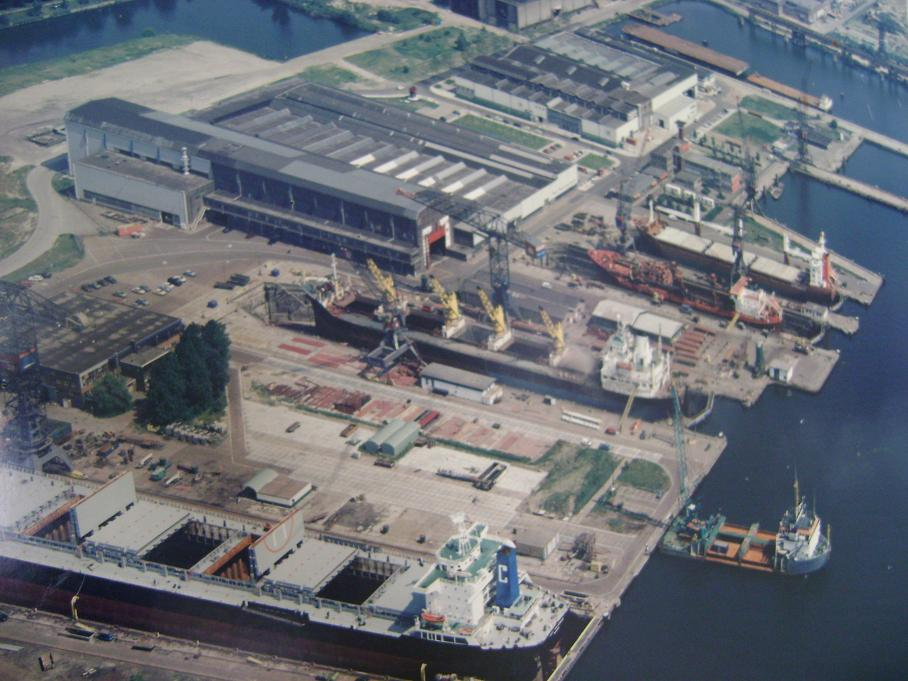
- Former docks of NDSM
- Industry: Shipbuilding
- Founded: 1946
- Defunct: 1979
- Headquarters: Amsterdam, the Netherlands
- Products: Civilian ships and warships

The Nederlandsche Dok en Scheepsbouw Maatschappij (NDSM, lit. 'Netherlands dock and shipbuilding company'), was a shipbuilding and repair company based in Amsterdam in the Netherlands. It existed from 1946 to 1978, when it was merged into a daughter company of the Amsterdamsche Droogdok Maatschappij NV.

From 1979 to 1985 the new company Amsterdamse Droogdok Maatschappij BV faced many problems. In 1985, it filed for bankruptcy. On the terrain a small company called ADM Naval Services (ANS) continued to operate for only a few years, before it vacated the premises.

The area of about 80 hectares (200 acres) has since 2013 been transformed into a city district as a distinct part of Amsterdam-Noord and is still under development. The industrial wharfs and structures have been replaced by apartment buildings and hospitality industry, still called NDSM.

== Foundation ==
=== Partnership turned into Public Company ===
The company came into existence as a general partnership named Nederlandsche Dok en Scheepsbouw Maatschappij (NDSM), founded by Nederlandsche Scheepsbouw Maatschappij (NSM) and Nederlandsche Dok Maatschappij (NDM) both from Amsterdam. On 27 February 1946 this partnership was confirmed by the shareholders of both companies. The partnership would soon be turned into the public company NDSM NV. All assets would be handed to NDSM, and staff would get a contract with NDSM. The board would be formed by members of the boards of the old public companies. These would continue to exist and remained accountable for any loss, but had no other relevance.

=== Customers ===
Customers of NDSM included Koninklijke Paketvaart-Maatschappij (KPM), Koninklijke Nederlandsche Stoomboot Maatschappij (KNSM), Royal Dutch Shell and the Royal Netherlands Navy.

== Warships built ==
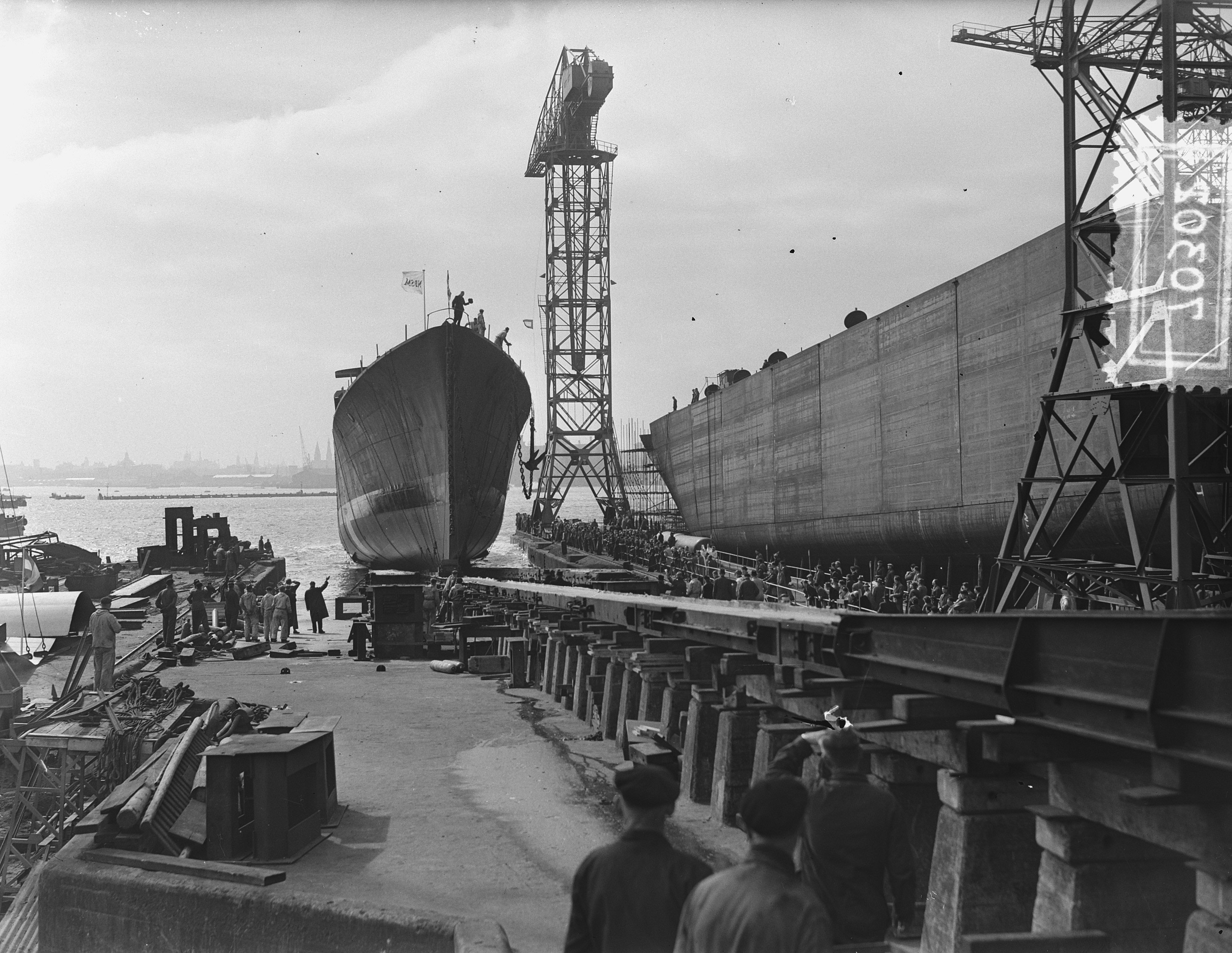
Launch of HNLMS Drenthe in 1955

Name	Launched	Note
Friesland-class destroyers
Friesland	1953	
Groningen	1954	
Drenthe	1955	
Amsterdam	1956	
Van Speijk-class frigates
Van Speijk	1965	
Tjerk Hiddes	1965	
Isaac Sweers	1967	
