= HNLMS Amsterdam (D819) =

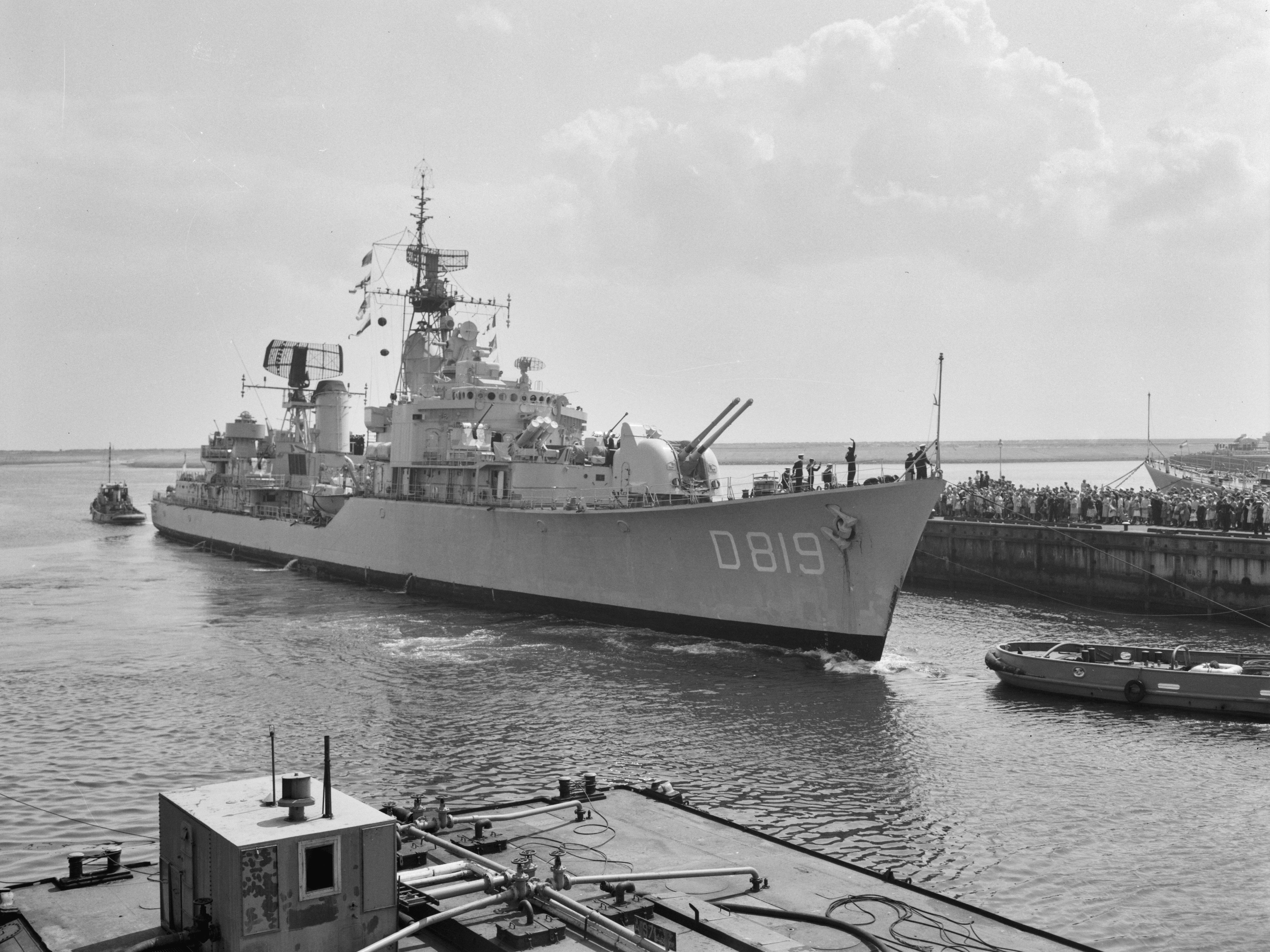
- Amsterdam

History

Netherlands
- Name: Amsterdam
- Namesake: Amsterdam
- Builder: NDSM, Amsterdam
- Laid down: 26 March 1955
- Launched: 25 August 1956
- Commissioned: 10 April 1958
- Decommissioned: 12 May 1980
- Fate: Sold to the Peruvian Navy

Peru
- Name: Villar
- Acquired: 1980
- Decommissioned: 1991
- Identification: DD77
- Status: decommissioned

General characteristics
- Type: Friesland-class destroyer
- Displacement: 2497 standard, 3070 tons full load
- Length: 116 m (381 ft)
- Beam: 11.7 m (38 ft)
- Draught: 5.2 m (17 ft)
- Propulsion: 2 shaft geared turbines, 4 BW boilers, Super-heated steam @ 620psi, 60,000 hp
- Speed: 36 kn (67 km/h; 41 mph)
- Range: 4,000 nmi (7,400 km; 4,600 mi) at 18 kn (33 km/h; 21 mph)
- Complement: 284
- Sensors & processing systems: Radar LW-02, DA-01, ZW-01, M45, Sonar Type PAE 1N, Type CWE 10
- Armament: 4 × Bofors 120 mm guns (2 × 2); 6 × 40mm Bofors AA guns (6 × 1); 8 × 375 mm anti submarine mortars (2 × 4); 2 × depth charge racks

HNLMS Amsterdam (D819) (Dutch: Hr.Ms. Amsterdam) was a destroyer of the Friesland class. The ship was in service with the Royal Netherlands Navy from 1957 to 1980. The destroyer was named after the Dutch city of Amsterdam and was the nineteenth ship with this name. In 1980, the ship was taken out of service and sold to Peru, where it was renamed Villar. The ship's radio call sign was "PABH".

== Dutch service history ==
HNLMS Amsterdam was one of eight Friesland-class destroyers and was built at the NDSM in Amsterdam. The keel laying took place on 26 March 1955 and the launching on 25 August 1956. The ship was put into service on 10 April 1958.

In late 1950s, the ship received a test installation that had earlier been on the Mercuur for testing the use of the British MK 20E torpedo.

The ship left on 8 October 1959 for Netherlands New Guinea visiting the ports of Gibraltar, Palermo, Beirut, Port Said, Colombo, Fremantle, Perth and Port Darwin along the way. The ship would arrive on 29 November in Biak. 10 April 1961 Amsterdam and HNLMS Piet Hein left for the Netherlands where they would arrive 20 months later.

On 12 May 1980, the vessel was decommissioned and sold to the Peruvian Navy.

== Peruvian service history ==
The ship was put into service on 23 May 1980, where the ship was renamed Villar and decommissioned in 1991.

== Bibliography ==
- Scheina, Robert L. & Smigielski, Adam (1995). "Peru". In Chumbley, Stephen (ed.). Conway's All the World's Fighting Ships, 1947–1995 (revised ed.). Naval Institute Press. pp. 303–307. ISBN 1-55750-132-7.
