= HNLMS Poolster (A835) =

Royal Netherlands Navy ship

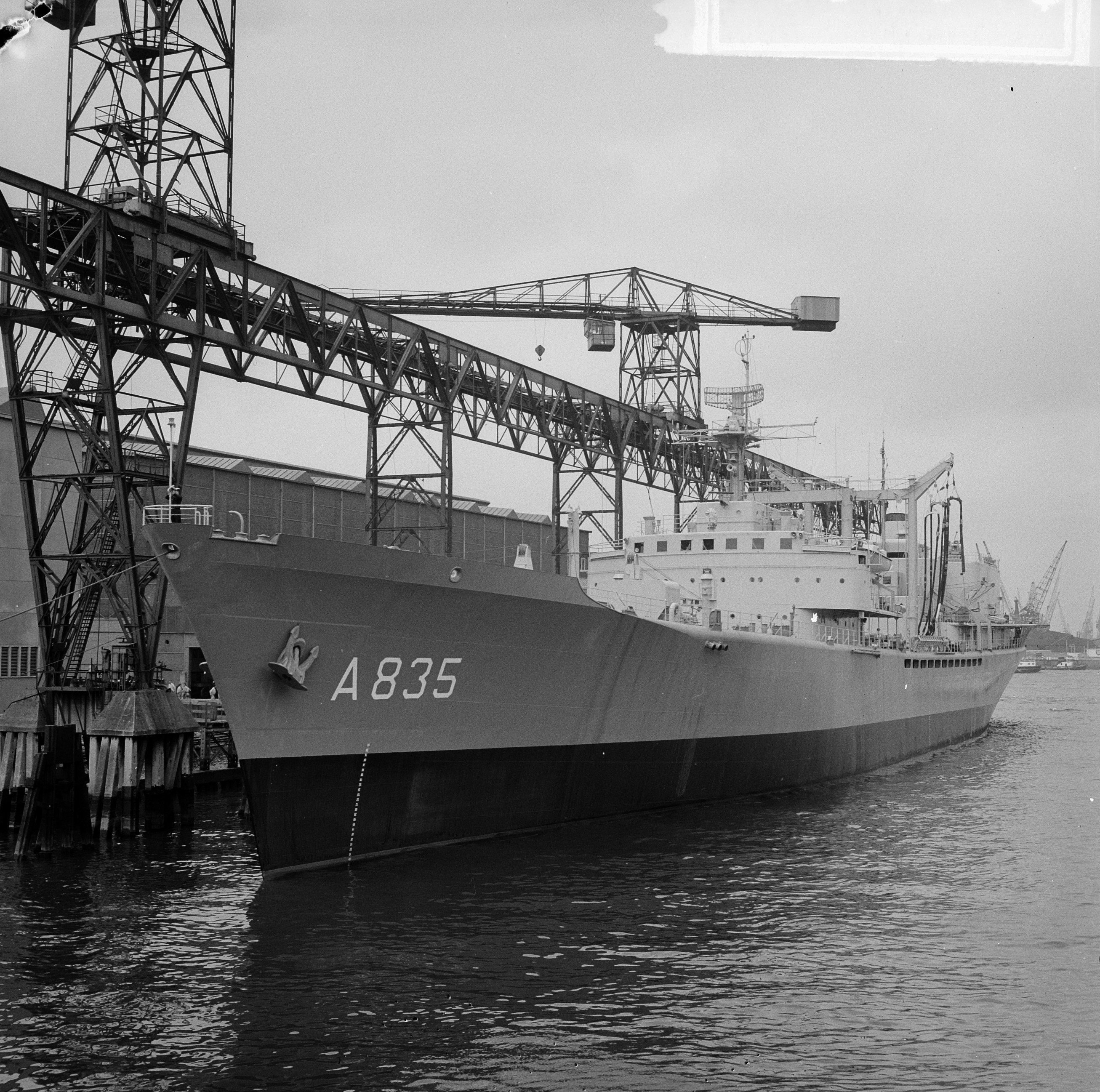
- HNLMS Poolster

Class overview
- Name: Poolster class
- Builders: RDM, Rotterdam
- Operators: Royal Netherlands Navy (Formerly); Pakistan Navy
- Succeeded by: HNLMS Amsterdam
- Subclasses: HNLMS Zuiderkruis
- Cost: ƒ22m (1962 prices)
- Built: 1962–1964
- In service: 1964-2019
- Planned: 1
- Completed: 1
- Retired: 1

History

Netherlands
- Name: Poolster
- Namesake: Pole star
- Ordered: 1961
- Builder: Rotterdamsche Droogdok Maatschappij
- Yard number: RDM-307
- Laid down: 19 September 1962
- Launched: 16 October 1963
- Commissioned: 29 June 1964
- Decommissioned: 28 July 1994
- Identification: A835
- Motto: Uw wil geschiede (Thy will be done)
- Fate: Sold to Pakistan in 1994

Pakistan
- Name: Moawin
- Acquired: 28 July 1994
- Identification: IMO number: 4902505; Pennant number: A20
- Fate: Scrapped 21 April 2019

General characteristics
- Type: Replenishment ship
- Displacement: 16,836 t (16,570 long tons)
- Length: 168.3 m (552 ft 2 in)
- Beam: 20.3 m (66 ft 7 in)
- Draught: 8.6 m (28 ft 3 in)
- Propulsion: 22,500 hp (16,778 kW), 2 turbines
- Speed: 21 knots (39 km/h; 24 mph)
- Complement: 200
- Armament: 2 × 40 mm (2 in) autocannons
- Aircraft carried: 3 × Lynx helicopters

HNLMS Poolster (Dutch: Hr.Ms. Poolster) was a replenishment ship serving with the Royal Netherlands Navy. Poolster entered service on 29 June 1964. In 1994 she was decommissioned and sold to the Pakistan Navy where the ship was renamed Moawin. A later replenishment ship Zuiderkruis was based on Poolster. In the Dutch navy she was replaced by the replenishment ship Amsterdam. She was the first ship in the Dutch navy with inbuilt protection against radioactive fallout.

== History ==
In 1960 the Royal Netherlands Navy noted that it needed a replenishment ship, after chartering earlier that year the turbine tanker Mijndrecht (of the shipping company Phs. van Ommeren) for a trip around the world with several Dutch navy ships. The replenishment ship allowed the Royal Netherlands Navy to supply its ships during long trips to different locations in the world, as well as during lengthy exercises. For example, in the context of NATO, to check the readiness of allied navies and to see how well they complement each other. At the end of 1961 the official order was given by the Dutch navy to build a replenishment ship. The design was done in-house by the Royal Netherlands Navy itself, while the Rotterdamsche Droogdok Maatschappij (RDM) got the order of actually building the ship. On 17 July 1962 the navy announced that the ship would be called Poolster, the same name as Poolster (1939) of the Government Navy, which was active when the Dutch East Indies was still a colony of the Netherlands. On 18 September 1962 the keel of Poolster was laid down at one of the docks of RDM. On 16 October 1963 at 4:30 pm the ship was launched. After Poolster was commissioned on 29 June 1964 extensive trial runs took place until the Dutch navy concluded in September 1964 that the ship had withstood the tests successfully. The first real supply at sea of Poolster happened on 14 October 1964, when Poolster supplied the HNLMS Van Ewijck.

== Design ==
During the designing phase the Royal Netherlands Navy expressed in their requirements that Poolster should not only be a tanker, but the ship also had to serve other purposes, such as transporting food, allow the landing of helicopters and transporting warehouse items. This resulted in the large water displacement of the ship (16,800 tons) and made Poolster the largest ship of the Dutch navy at the time. Another first was that Poolster had protection against radioactive fall-out. To deliver supplies Poolster had seven delivery points; two in front of the bridge, two behind the bridge, two in front of the flight deck and one behind the flight deck. To move supplies around the ship, the vessel had several loading trees which were based on both the English system as well as the American system (high tensioning gear). The ship also had cranes to lift and move supplies into the hangar. Besides a hangar, Poolster had several tanks which could be used for storing fluids such as water and oil. The accommodation of the ship was spacious in comparison to other Dutch navy ships, each room contained enough beds to accommodate twelve persons. Furthermore, there was room for a table and several chairs. In addition there was accommodation for women in the navy. Poolster had a landing deck at the back of the ship which could accommodate two helicopters, which allowed helicopters to move supplies quickly through the air to their destination.

== Dutch service history ==
In July 1976 Poolster, together with the frigates Tromp, Van Nes, Van Galen, the destroyers Holland, Zeeland and the submarine Dolfijn visited New York City in commemoration of the city's 200th anniversary.

On 8 June 1977 Poolster, with the frigate Tromp and destroyers Groningen and Overijssel, visited Leningrad.

On 12 March 1979 she and the frigates Tromp and Kortenaer and the destroyer Drenthe departed for a trip to the Far East to show the flag.

The frigates De Ruyter, Callenburgh, Jan van Brakel, Van Kinsbergen and Poolster departed from Den Helder on 13 January 1986 for a trip to the Far East to show the flag and promote Dutch trade. The ships returned on 19 June.

She was the last ship in the Dutch navy powered by steam turbines.

== Pakistan service ==
In 1988, the Pakistan Navy entered in negotiation with the Royal Netherlands Navy, and the transfer took place in April 1989. HNLMS Poolster was decommissioned on 28 July 1994 and transferred to the Pakistan Navy which renamed her Moawin.

=== 2005 fire incident ===
On 10 March 2005, Moawin caught fire while undergoing maintenance at Karachi Naval Dockyard. At least 53 people died, including nine officers, 34 sailors and 10 civilians and 59 people were injured, including three officers, 23 sailors and 33 civilians.

Moawin was scrapped at Gadani Beach on 21 April 2019.
