= HNLMS Drenthe =

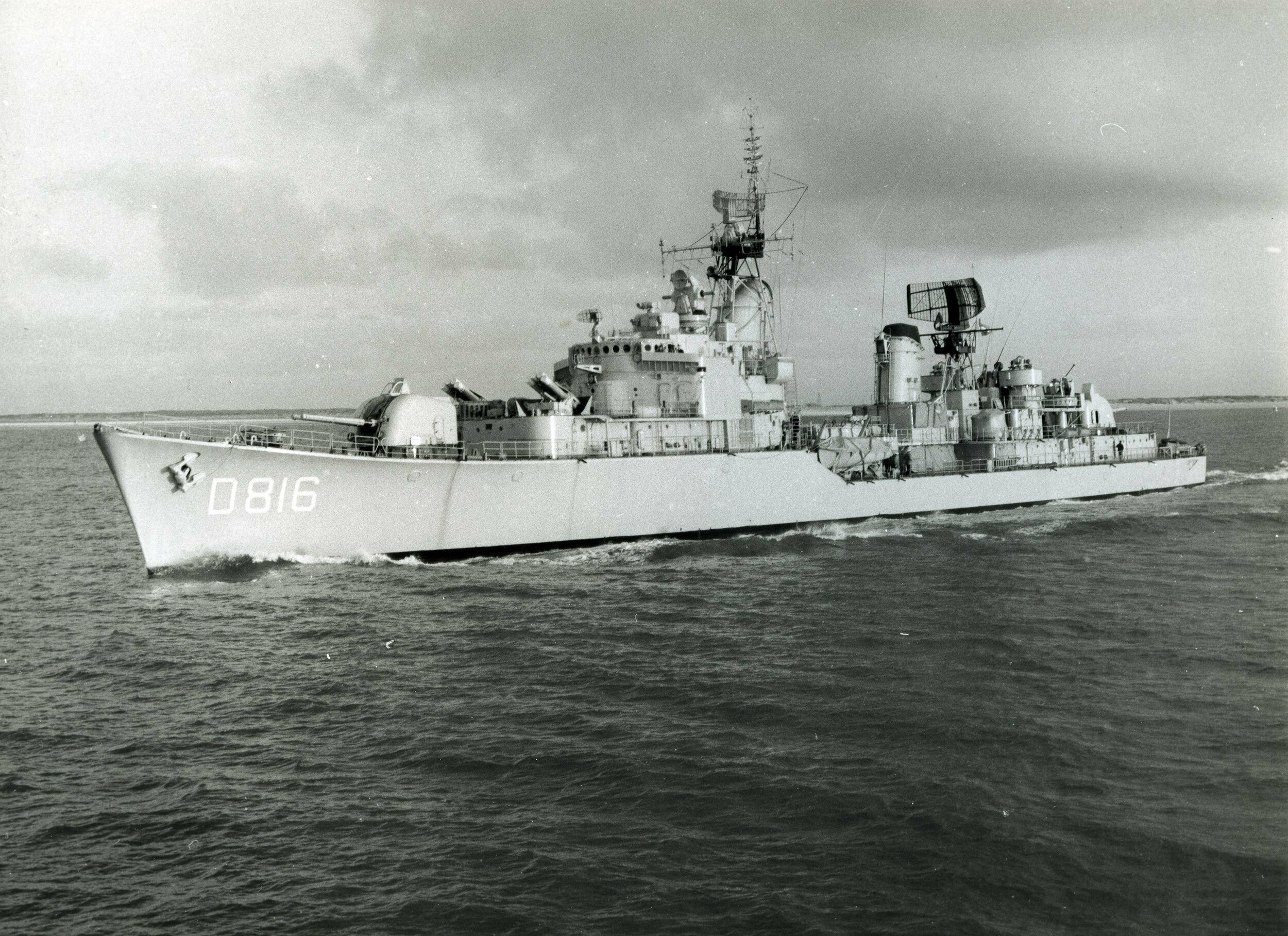
- Drenthe

History

Netherlands
- Name: Drenthe
- Namesake: Drenthe
- Builder: NDSM, Amsterdam
- Laid down: 9 January 1954
- Launched: 26 March 1955
- Commissioned: 1 August 1957
- Decommissioned: 24 November 1980
- Fate: Sold to the Peruvian Navy

Peru
- Name: Guise
- Acquired: 3 June 1981
- Decommissioned: 1985
- Identification: DD72
- Fate: Decommissioned

General characteristics
- Type: Friesland-class destroyer
- Displacement: 2497 standard, 3070 tons full load
- Length: 116 m (381 ft)
- Beam: 11.7 m (38 ft)
- Draught: 5.2 m (17 ft)
- Installed power: 4 BW boilers; 60,000 hp
- Propulsion: 2 shaft geared turbines
- Speed: 36 kn (67 km/h; 41 mph)
- Range: 4,000 nmi (7,400 km; 4,600 mi) at 18 kn (33 km/h; 21 mph)
- Complement: 284
- Sensors & processing systems: Radar LW-02, DA-01, ZW-01, M45, Sonar Type PAE 1N, Type CWE 10
- Armament: 4 × Bofors 120 mm guns (2 × 2); 6 × 40mm Bofors AA guns (6 × 1); 8 × 375 mm anti submarine mortars (2 × 4); 2 × depth charge racks

HNLMS Drenthe (D816) (Dutch: Hr.Ms. Drenthe) was a destroyer of the Friesland class. The ship was in service with the Royal Netherlands Navy from 1956 to 1980. The destroyer was named after the Dutch province of Drenthe and was the fourth ship with this name. In 1980 the ship was taken out of service and sold to Peru where it was renamed Guise. The ship's radio call sign was "PALZ".

== Dutch service history ==
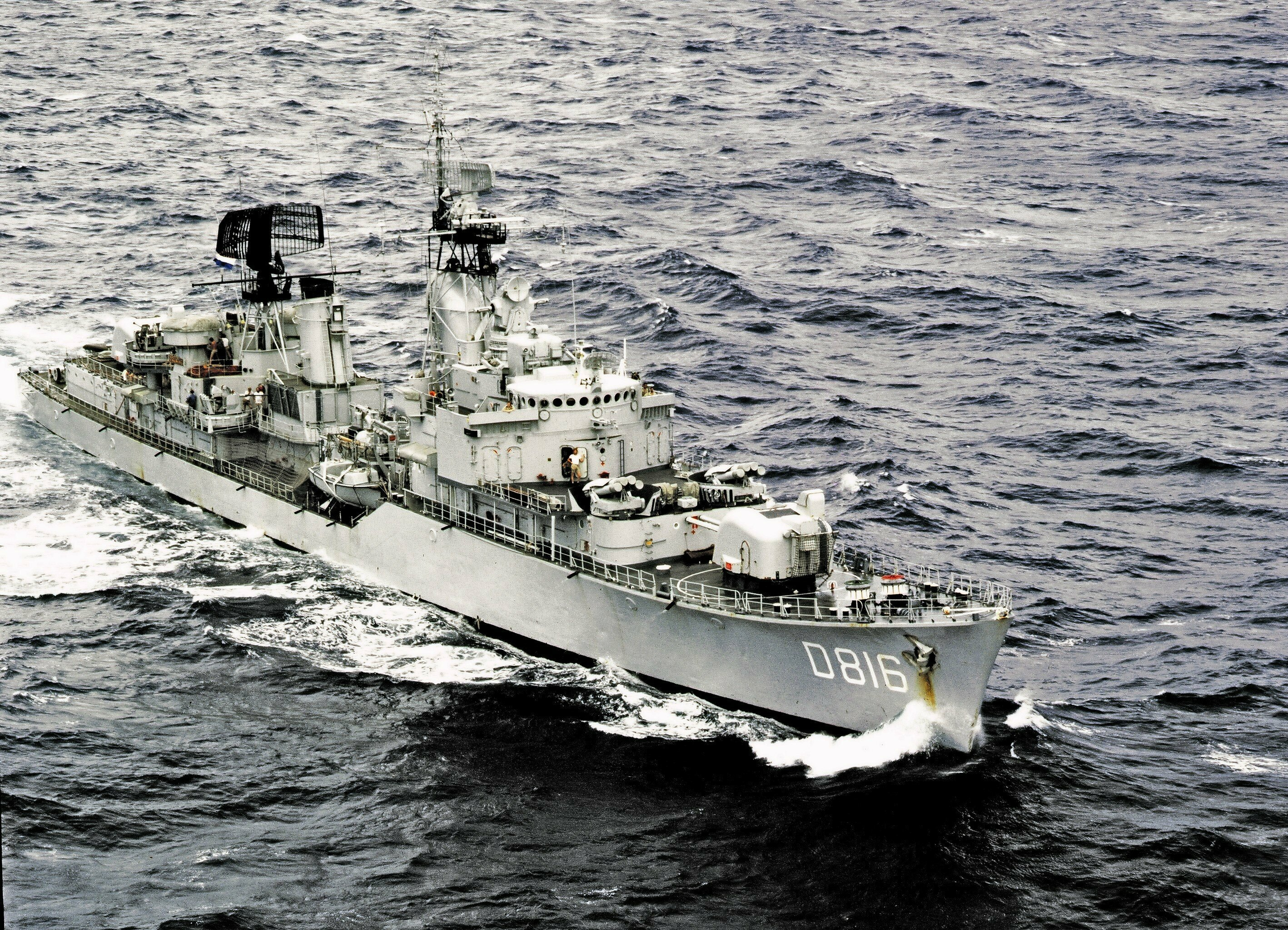
Drenthe, date unknown

HNLMS Drenthe was one of eight Friesland-class destroyers and was built at the NDSM in Amsterdam. The keel laying took place on 9 January 1954 and the launching on 26 March 1955. The ship was put into service on 1 August 1957.

On 12 March 1979 she and the frigates Tromp and Kortenaer and the replenishment ship Poolster departed for a trip to the Far East to show the flag.

A fire broke out in the engine room on 12 November 1980 during the last journey the ship made. Two crewman died during the fire and four were injured. The fire was caused by an attempt to burn paper in the engine room. That day Drenthe was in the Caribbean to relieve Rotterdam as station ship. The ship was however so damaged by the fire that the Rotterdam had to tow her to the harbor.

On 24 November 1980 the vessel was decommissioned and sold to the Peruvian Navy.

== Peruvian service history ==
The ship was put into service on 3 June 1981 where the ship was renamed Guise and decommissioned in 1985.

== Bibliography ==
- Scheina, Robert L. & Smigielski, Adam (1995). "Peru". In Chumbley, Stephen (ed.). Conway's All the World's Fighting Ships, 1947–1995 (revised ed.). Naval Institute Press. pp. 303–307. ISBN 1-55750-132-7.
