= NDSM =

Area in north Amsterdam, the Netherlands

Coordinates: 52.4016036°N 4.8915066°E

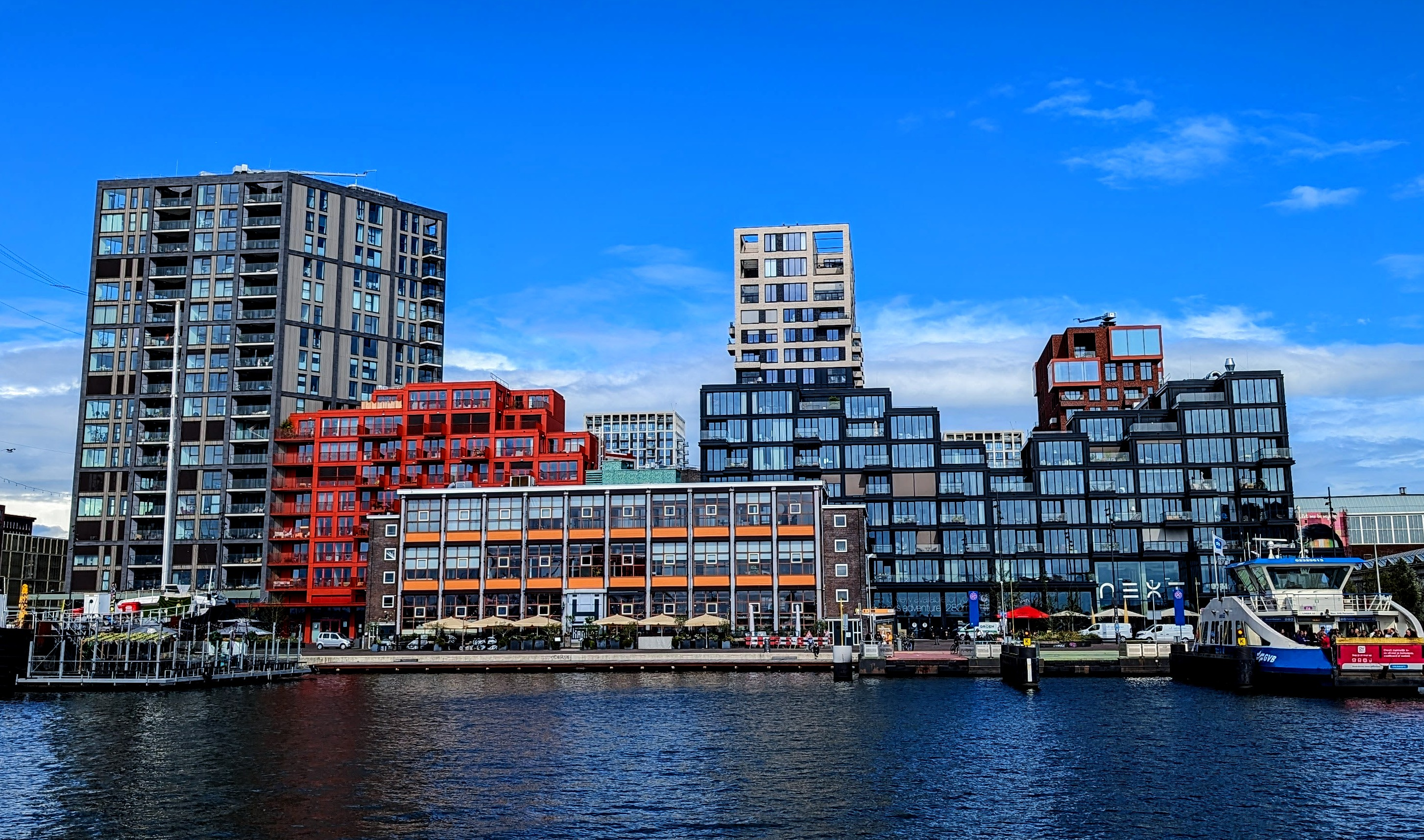
Pontkade III in NDSM

NDSM is a neighborhood in Amsterdam, Netherlands located on the former terrain of the Nederlandsche Dok en Scheepsbouw Maatschappij (NDSM) shipbuilding company. It is located in the Amsterdam-Noord borough along the IJ river and can be reached by ferry from Amsterdam Centraal station. After the shipyard closed, the various buildings were occupied by squatters before being gentrified in the 2000s, becoming offices for groups such as Greenpeace, Pernod Ricard, Red Bull, Paramount and HEMA HQ. The East part of the former wharf houses a large number of art galleries and festivals throughout the year. The IJhallen is the biggest flea market in Europe. It also boasts a number of popular restaurants such as Pllek, IJver, Loetje aan het IJ, Noorderlicht and Kometen Brood. NDSM-West is being redeveloped as a mixed-use residential area with high-rise buildings up to 120 meters. By 2034, NDSM-West will have 5000 residential units. NDSM-Oost will be redeveloped into a city park with art galleries and monumental buildings.

== History ==
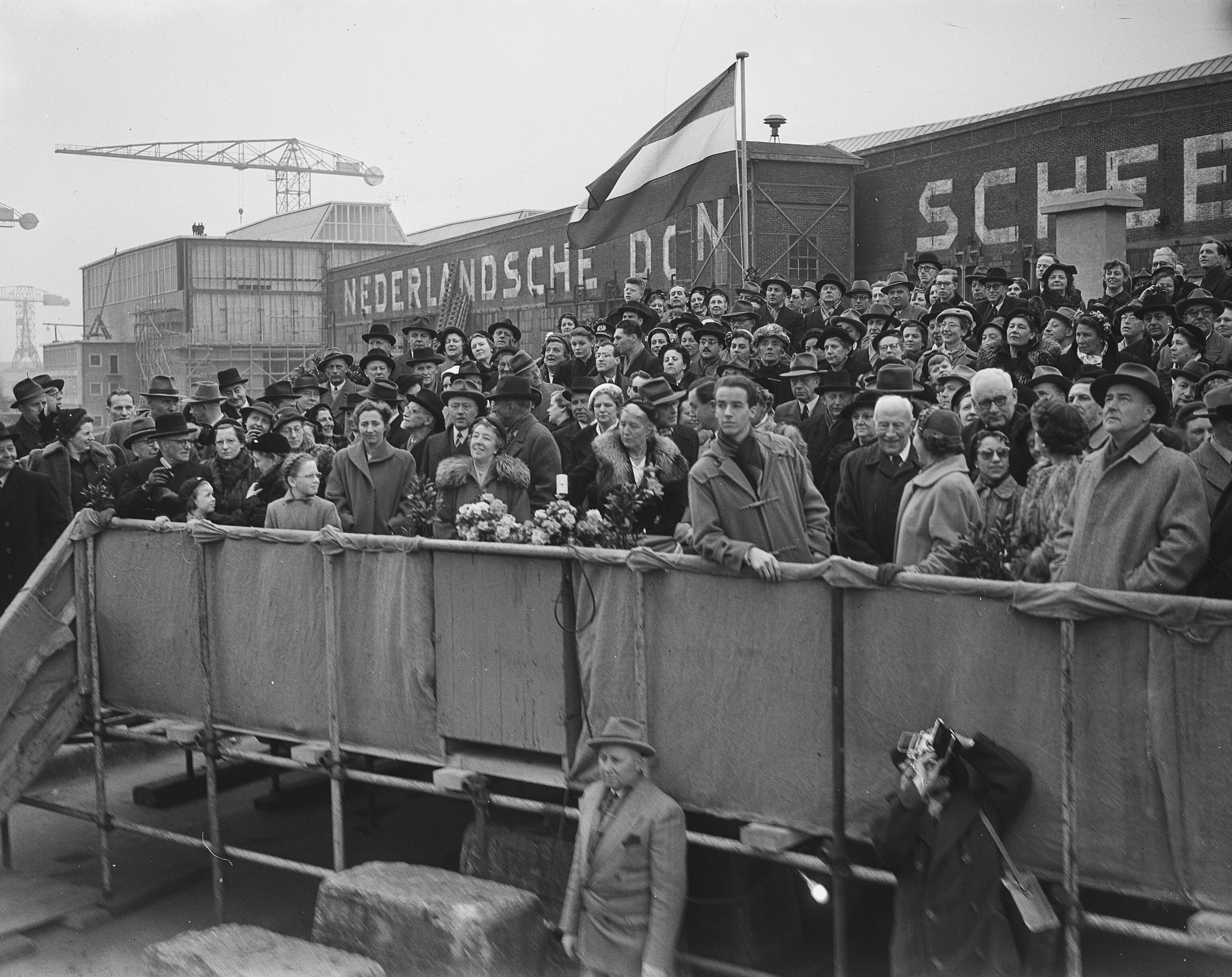
NDSM during its time as a shipyard

The Nederlandsche Dok en Scheepsbouw Maatschappij (NDSM) existed until 1984, building and repairing ships. After the 90 hectare area of docks and shipyards became derelict, it was bought up by the Amsterdam-Noord borough.

In the 1990s, NDSM was largely squatted before Amsterdam-Noord began an urban regeneration process in 1999. The squatters realised they needed to adapt to the new situation and formed a foundation called Kinetisch Noord (Kinetic North) to represent their interests. A number of squats which were seen as cultural hotspots were legalized across the city and Kinetisch Noord became engaged in this process, arguing that NDSM was an incubator.

== Incubator ==
In the 2000s, NDSM became popular as a cultural incubator zone, despite its relative distance from the centre of Amsterdam. Groups such as Red Bull, HEMA, MTV and publishing company VNU set up offices and as a result property prices rocketed. At around the same time, other post-industrial zones in other European cities have been redeveloped, such as Andrejsala in Riga, HafenCity in Hamburg, Kaapelitehdas in Helsinki, the Luma factory in Stockholm, Mediaspree in Berlin, the Northern Quarter in Manchester.

According to Lonely Planet, NDSM is a "derelict shipyard turned edgy arts community." Most of the yearly Over het IJ festival takes place in NDSM. The last remaining hammerhead crane, Hensen Kraan 13, was dismantled in July 2013 and transferred to a yard in Franeker to be refurbished and converted into luxury hotel rooms. On 22 October 2013 the crane returned to become the Crane Hotel Faralda with three hotel suites and a television studio. As of 2019, NDSM still contained the huge Scheepsbouwloods (shipbuilding warehouse) and drydock. Organisations using buildings on the terrain included Greenpeace, Pernod Ricard and ViacomCBS. There is also a DoubleTree hotel and a botel. The decommissioned Russian submarine (NATO reporting name Foxtrot, Russian Navy pennant number B-80) was removed from NDSM in December 2019 and scrapped in Vlaardingen early in 2020.

== See also ==
- ADM (Amsterdam)
- Vrankrijk

== Gallery ==
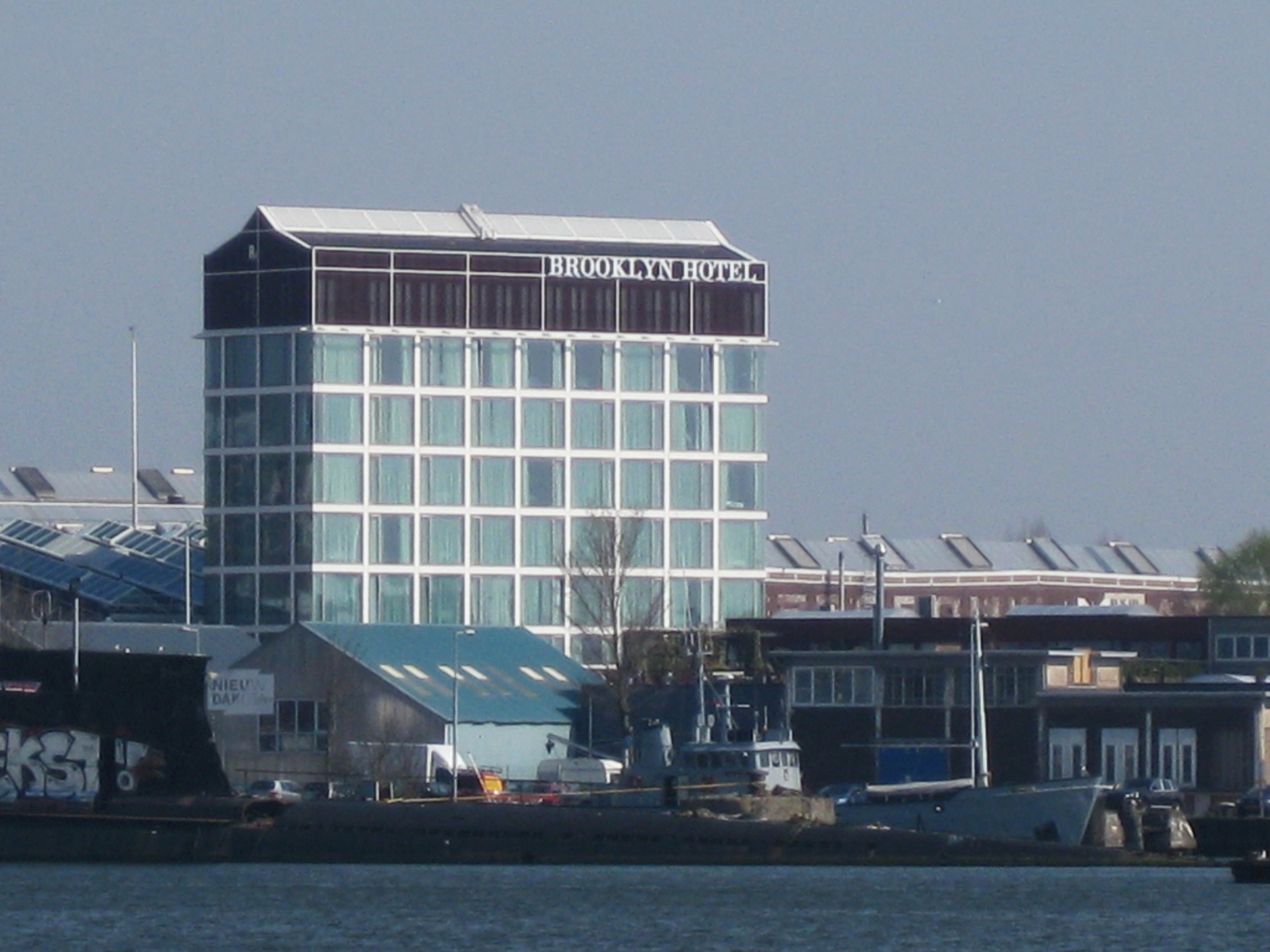
Brooklyn Hotel

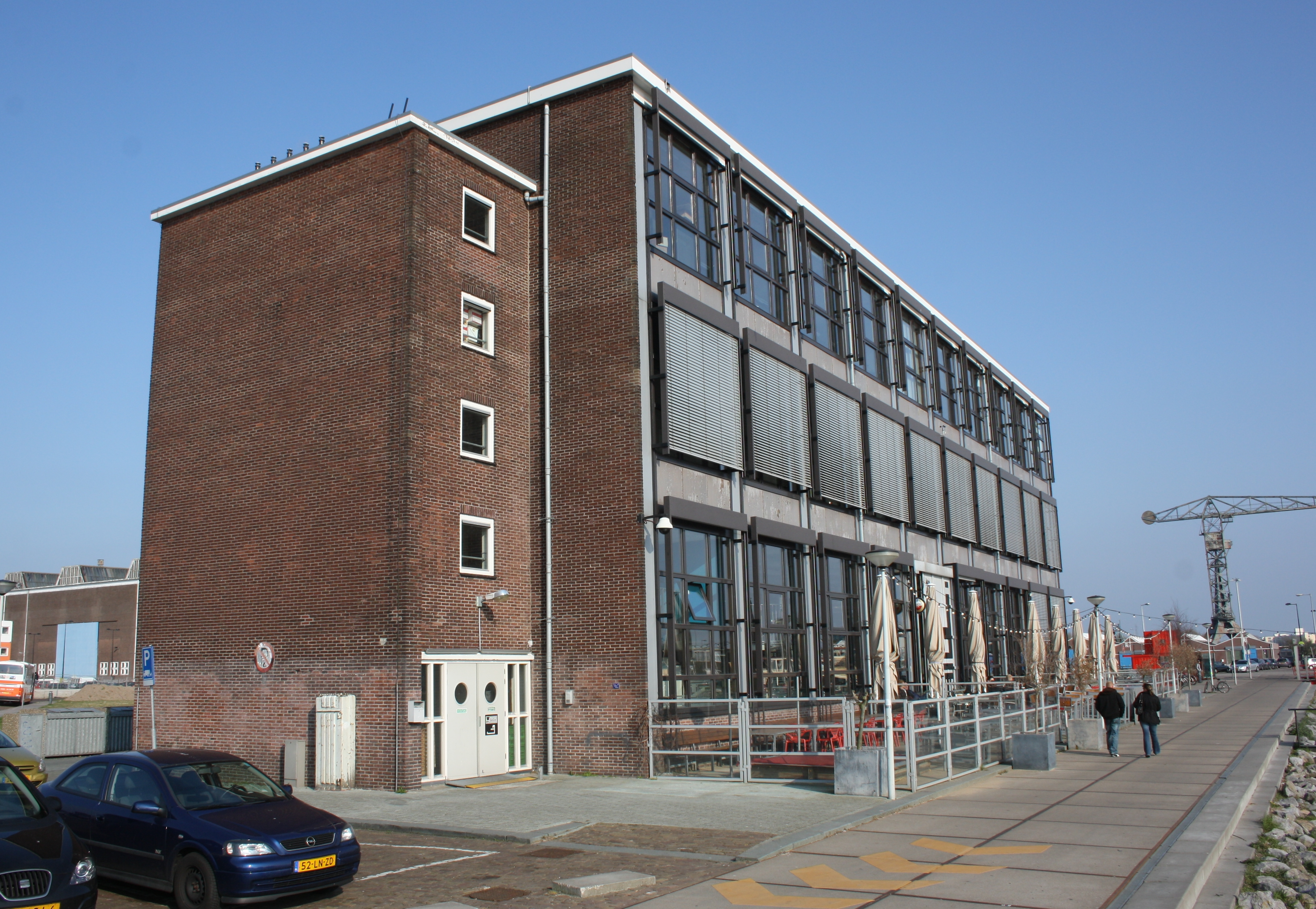

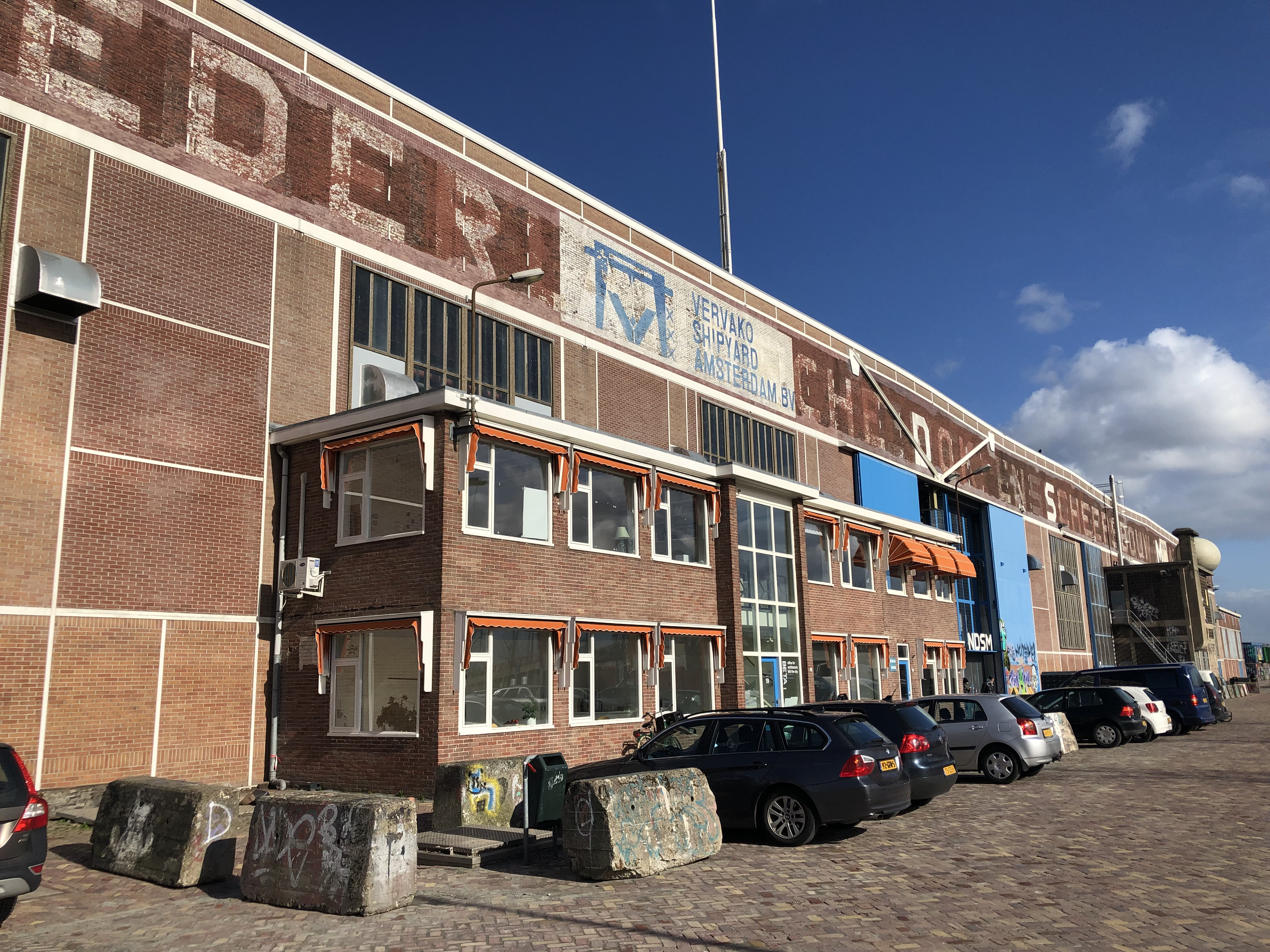
NDSM building of the company

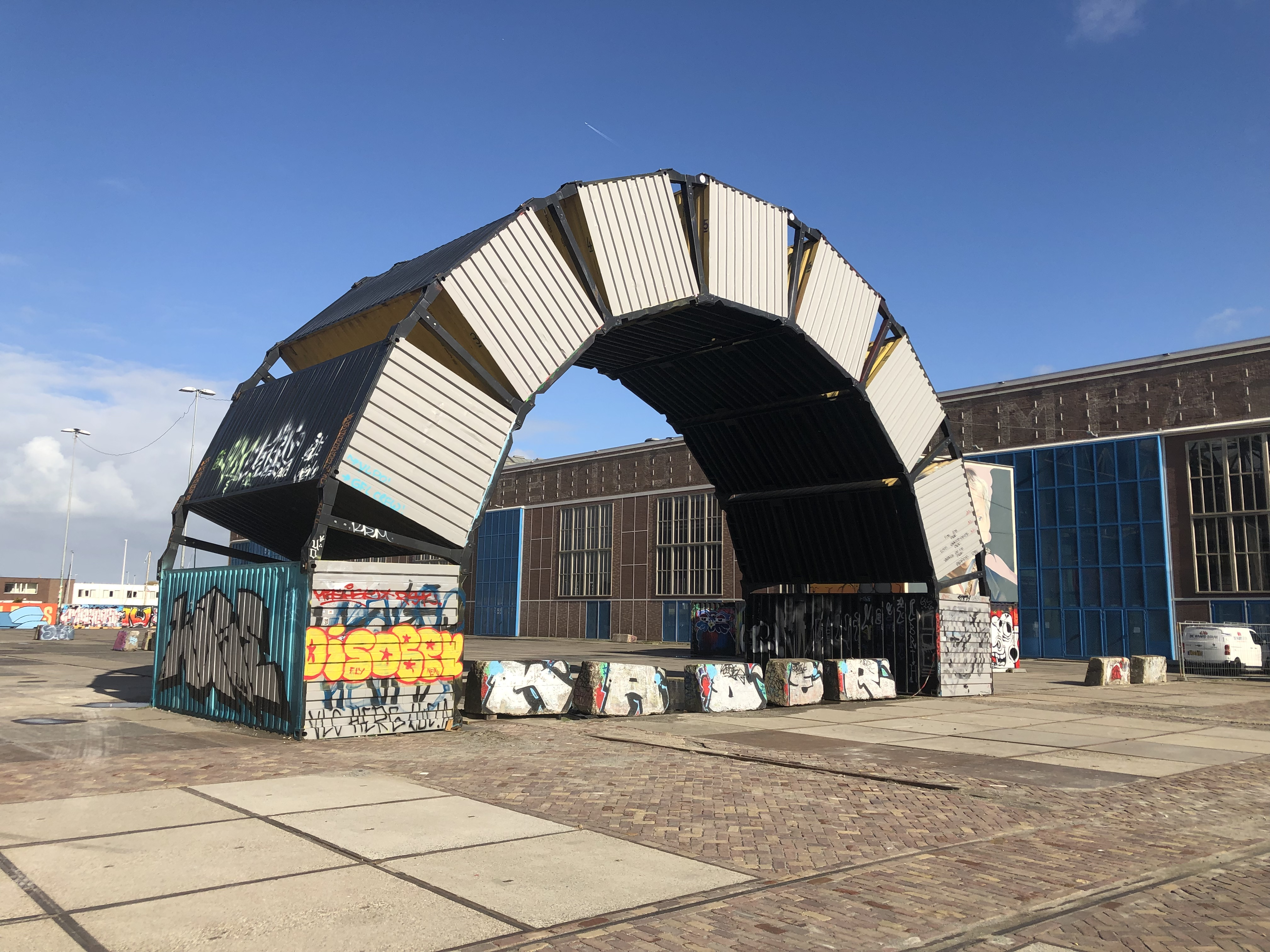
Arch built of containers

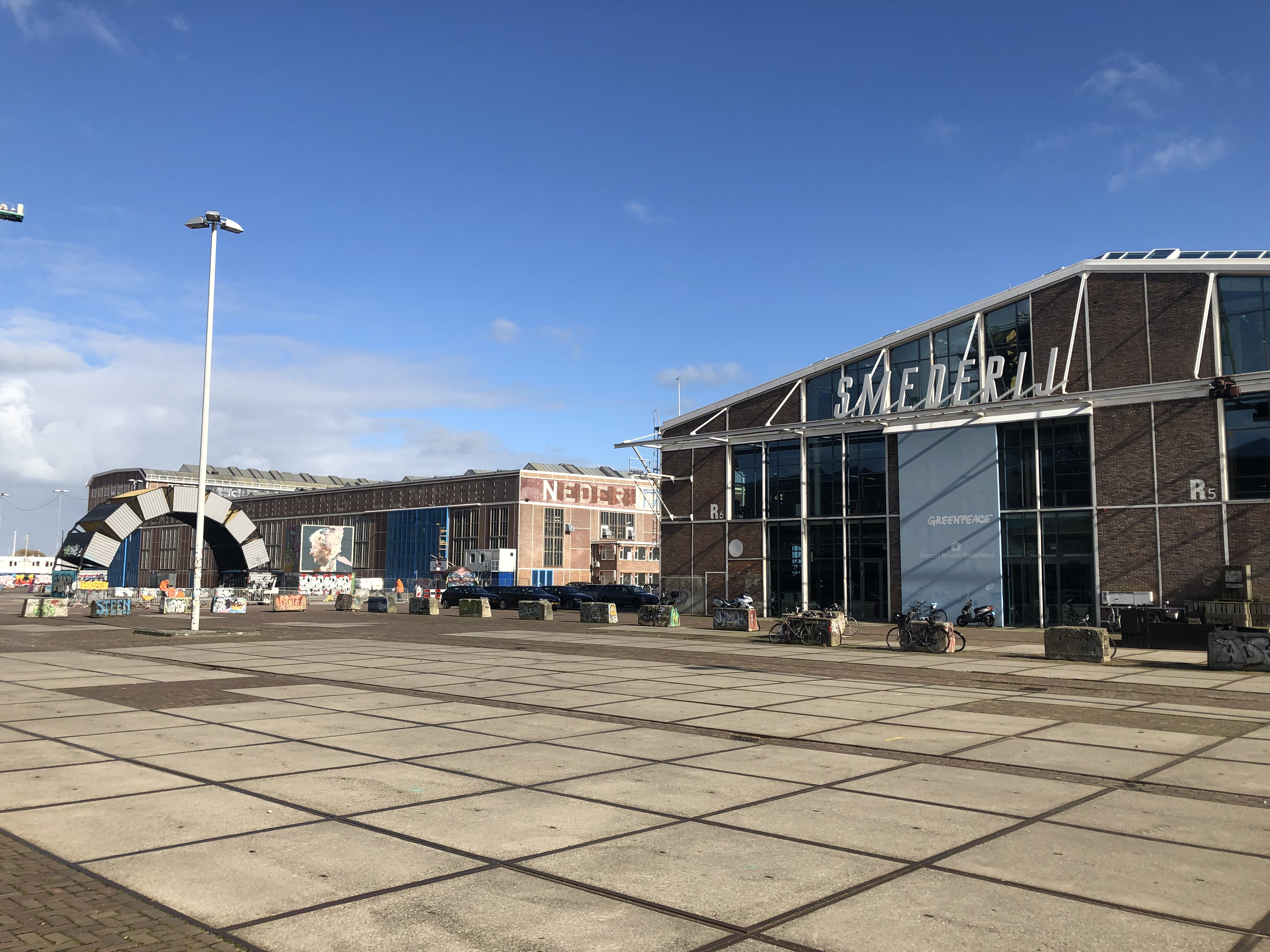
Open ground

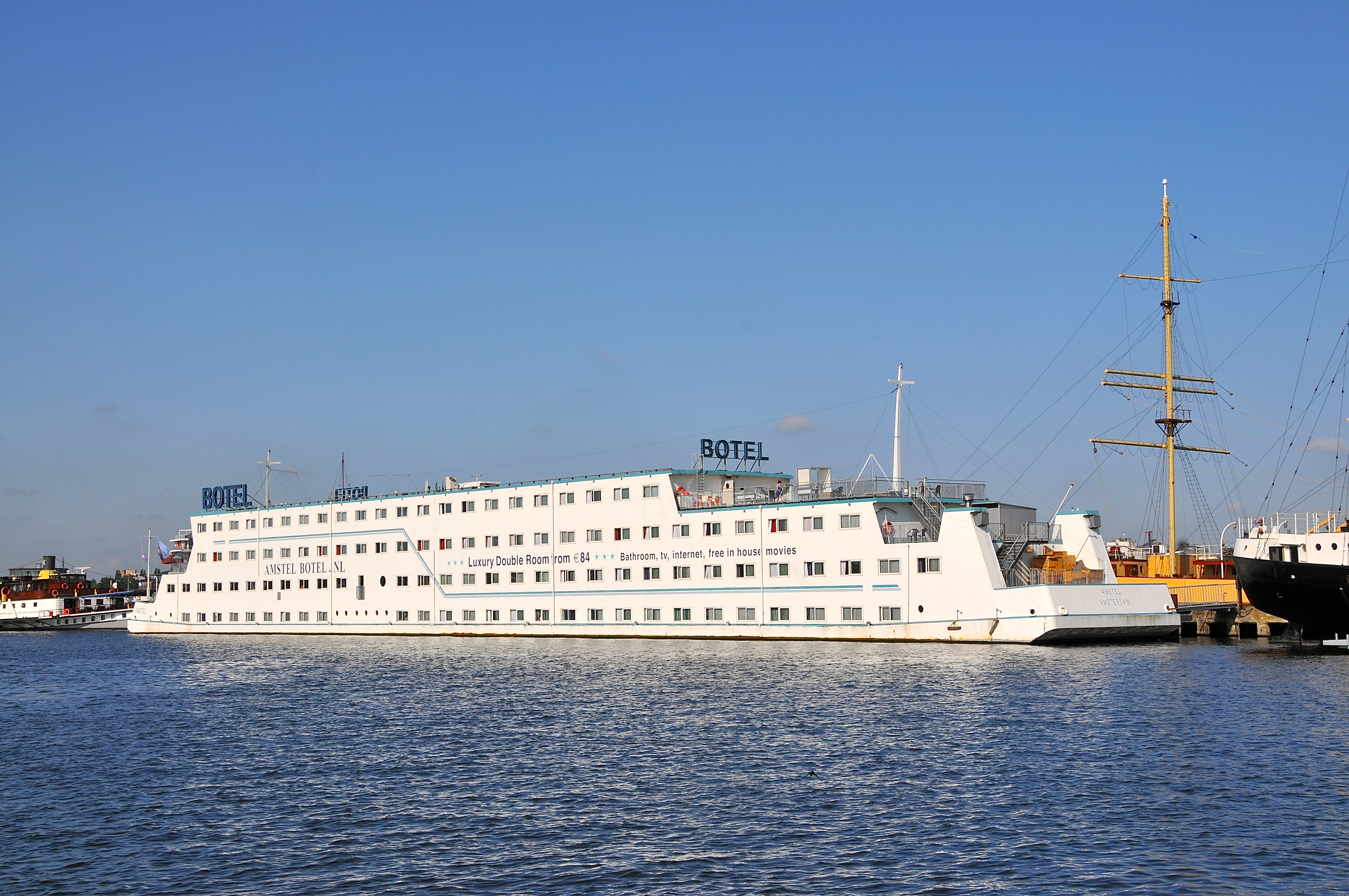
Amstel Botel (boat hotel)

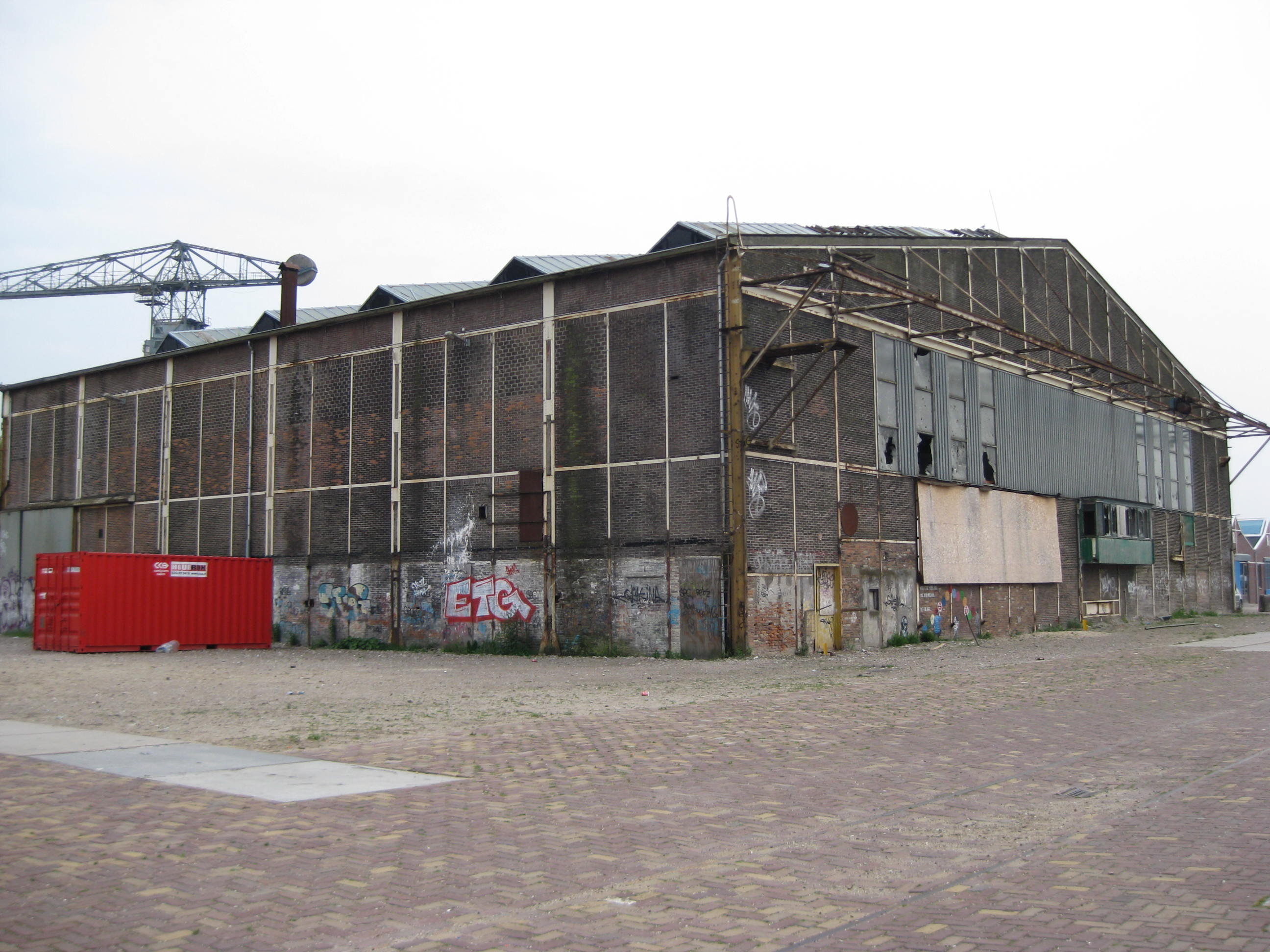

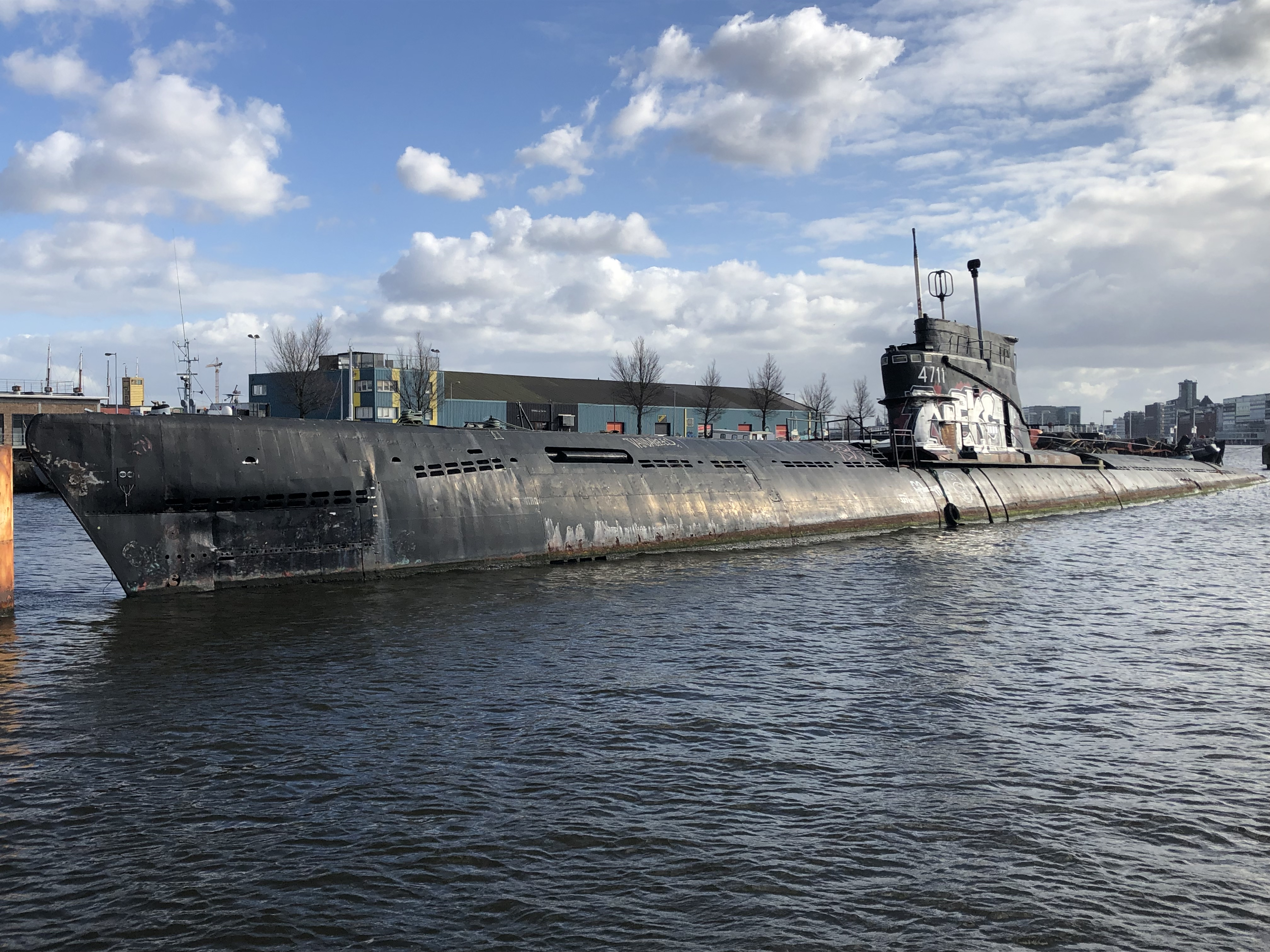
Submarine at NDSM

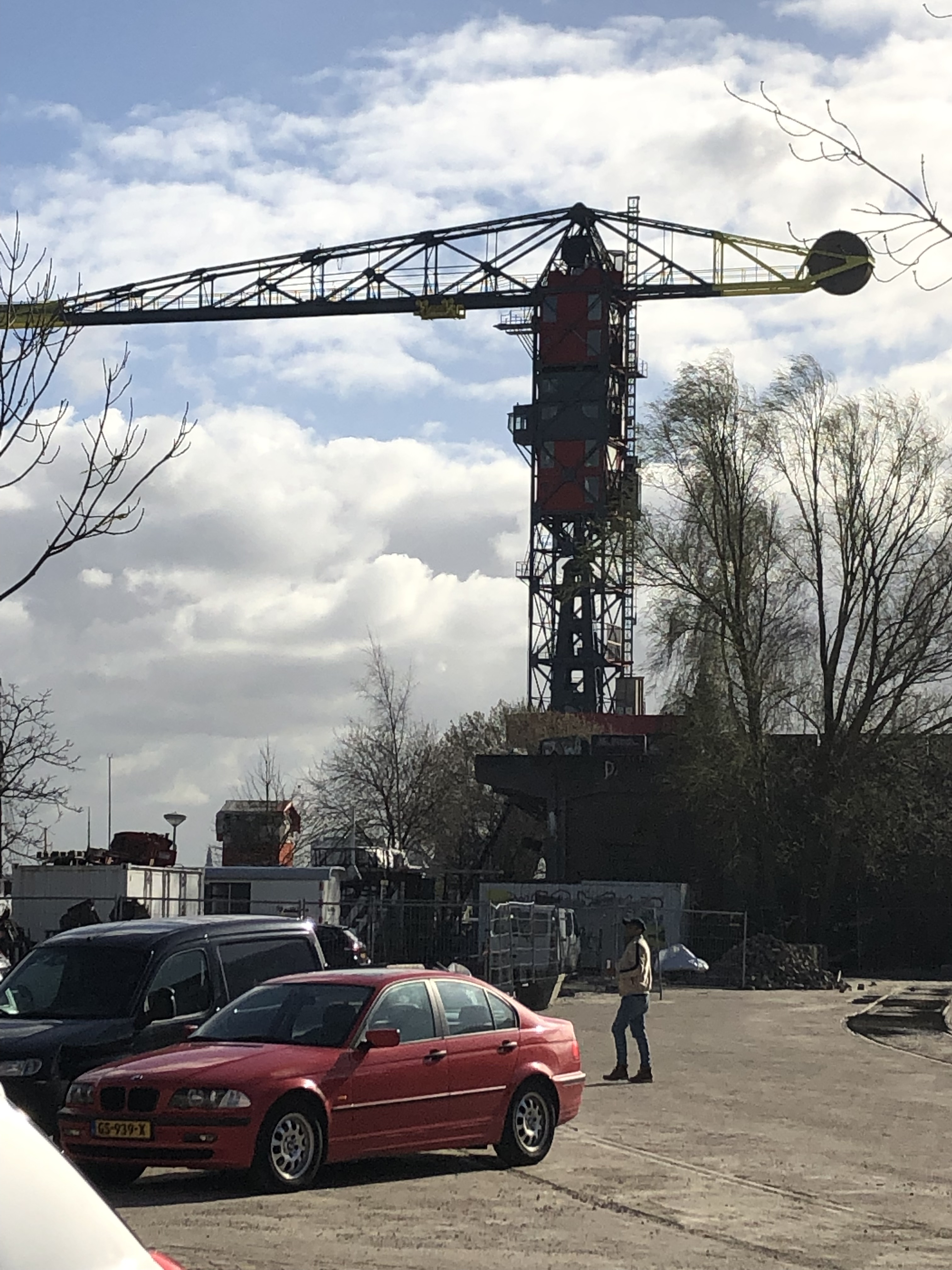
Crane hotel at NDSM
