= HNLMS Overijssel =

Destroyer of the Friesland class

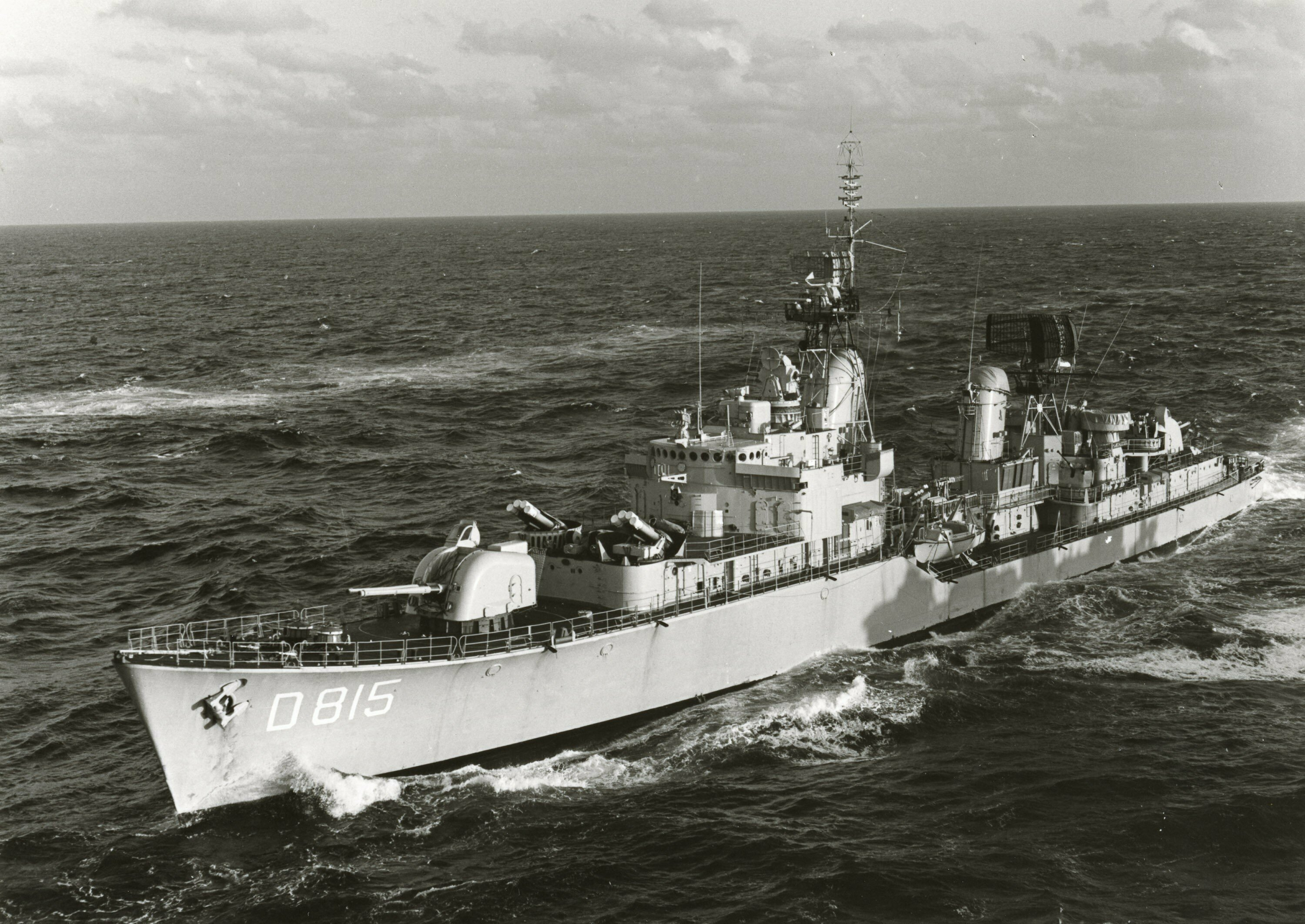
- Overijssel

History

Netherlands
- Name: Overijssel
- Namesake: Overijssel
- Builder: Wilton-Fijenoord, Schiedam
- Laid down: 15 October 1953
- Launched: 8 August 1955
- Commissioned: 4 October 1957
- Decommissioned: 11 June 1982
- Fate: Sold to the Peruvian Navy

Peru
- Name: Coronel Bolognesi
- Acquired: 1982
- Decommissioned: 1990
- Identification: DD70
- Status: decommissioned

General characteristics
- Type: Friesland-class destroyer
- Displacement: 2497 standard, 3070 tons full load
- Length: 116 m (381 ft)
- Beam: 11.7 m (38 ft)
- Draught: 5.2 m (17 ft)
- Propulsion: 2 shaft geared turbines, 4 BW boilers, Super-heated steam @ 620psi, 60,000 hp
- Speed: 36 kn (67 km/h; 41 mph)
- Range: 4,000 nmi (7,400 km; 4,600 mi) at 18 kn (33 km/h; 21 mph)
- Complement: 284
- Sensors & processing systems: Radar LW-02, DA-01, ZW-01, M45, Sonar Type PAE 1N, Type CWE 10
- Armament: 4 × Bofors 120 mm guns (2 × 2); 6 × 40mm Bofors AA guns (6 × 1); 8 × 375 mm anti submarine mortars (2 × 4); 2 × depth charge racks

HNLMS Overijssel (D815) (Dutch: Hr.Ms. Overijssel) was a destroyer of the Friesland class. The ship was in service with the Royal Netherlands Navy from 1957 to 1982. The destroyer was named after the Dutch province of Overijssel and was the twelfth ship with this name. In 1982 the ship was taken out of service and sold to Peru where it was renamed Coronel Bolognesi.

== Design ==
The Friesland-class destroyers were an improved and larger derivative of the previous Holland-class, with more powerful machinery and heavier anti-aircraft armament. Like the Hollands, they were specialised escort ships, intended to defend convoys and task forces against hostile submarines and air attack.

Overijssel was 116.0 m (380.6 ft) long overall and 112.8 m (370 ft) between perpendiculars, with a beam of 11.7 m (38 ft) and a draught of 5.2 m (17 ft). Displacement was 2,497 long tons (2,537 t) standard and 3,070 long tons (3,120 t) full load. Unusually for destroyer-type ships, the Frieslands were fitted with side and deck armour to protect against splinter damage from near-misses by bombs. The machinery was based on that of the American Gearing-class destroyers, with four Babcock & Wilcox boilers feeding two sets of geared steam turbines rated at 45,000 kW (60,000 shp) and driving two propeller shafts. This gave a speed of 36 knots (67 km/h; 41 mph). Range was 4,000 nmi (4,600 mi; 7,400 km) at 18 knots (33 km/h; 21 mph). The ship had a crew of 284 officers and other ranks.

As built, Overijssel had a main gun armament of two twin Bofors 120 mm (4.7 in) automatic dual-purpose guns, with a close-in anti-aircraft armament of six Bofors 40 mm guns, four grouped around the mainmast and two forward of the ship's bridge. Anti-submarine armament consisted of two quadruple launchers for Bofors 375mm anti submarine rockets and two depth charge racks. In 1961, Overijssel was fitted with eight fixed 533 mm (21 inch) torpedo tubes for anti-submarine torpedoes, but these were unsuccessful and were removed by 1962. The two 40 mm guns forward of the bridge were removed in 1965 and the fire control systems for the remaining 40 mm guns removed in 1977–78.

== Dutch service history ==
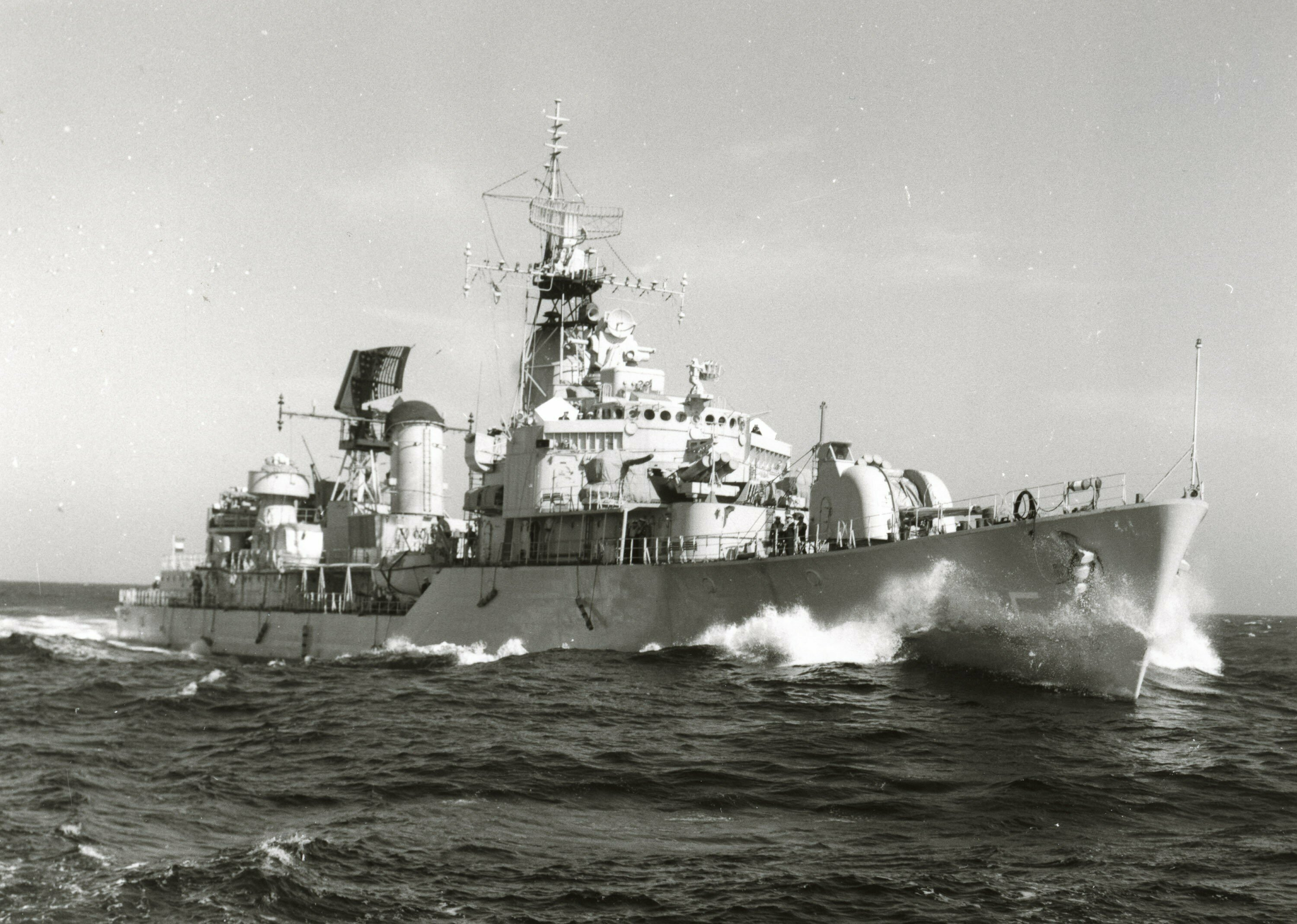
Overijssel in the high seas, 1960

HNLMS Overijssel was one of eight Friesland-class destroyers and was built at the Wilton-Fijenoord in Schiedam. The ship was laid down on 15 October 1953 and was launched on 8 August 1955. Overijssel was put into service on 4 October 1957. On 1 July 1958 Overijssel departed from Den Helder to Dutch New Guinea. It reached Sorong on 7 August 1958 via the Suez Canal and Singapore. In November 1959 the ship returned to Den Helder.

In 1962 Overijssel again served in Dutch New Guinea. After the signing of the New York Agreement, Overijssel sailed the Sorong-Biak route several times and again to remove troops from the army.

On 14 November 1962 the ship left Biak as the last Dutch navy ship to leave Dutch New Guinea (Biak), returning to the Netherlands via the Suez Canal.

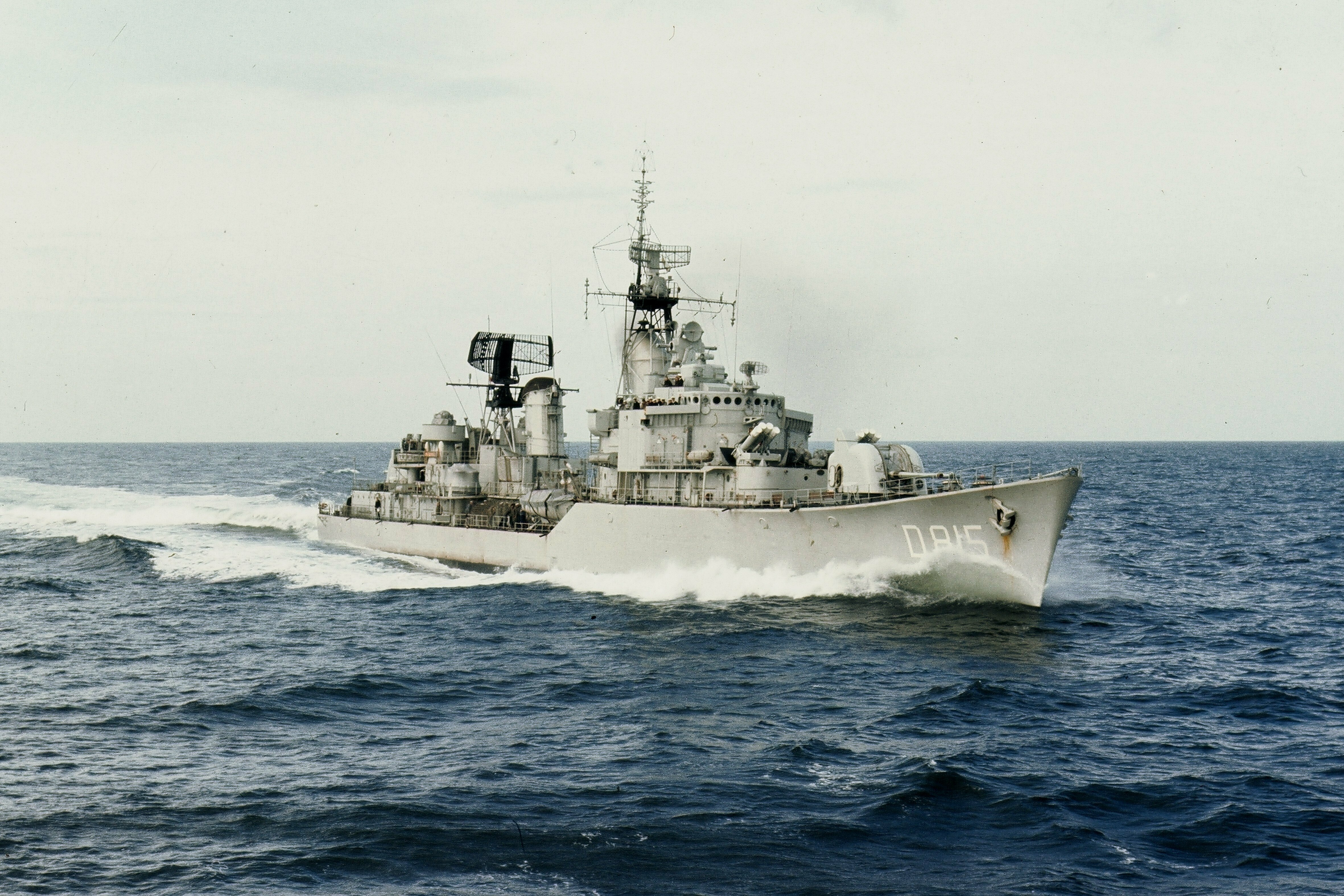
Overijssel

On 8 June 1977 Overijssel, with the frigate Tromp, the replenishment ship Poolster and destroyer Groningen, visited Leningrad. This was the first Dutch squadron to visit Leningrad in twenty one years.

Overijssel was guardship for the 1979 Fastnet race, the last of five races of the Admiral's Cup. When severe weather hit the race on 13 and 14 August, the ship participated in rescue operations, both acting as a communications relay and directly rescuing the crews of yachts that had sunk or were in distress. Overijssel rescued survivors from three yachts as well as recovering several dead bodies.

In March 1980 Overijssel provided help after the collapse of the oil platform Alexander L. Kielland near the coast of Norway.

8 February 1982 the ship together with the frigates Tromp, Callenburgh, Van Speijk, Piet Hein and the replenishment ship Zuiderkruis departed from Den Helder for a trip to the USA to show the flag and for 200 years diplomatic relations. The ships returned to Den Helder on 19 May 1982.

On 11 June 1982 the vessel was decommissioned and sold to the Peruvian Navy.

== Peruvian service history ==
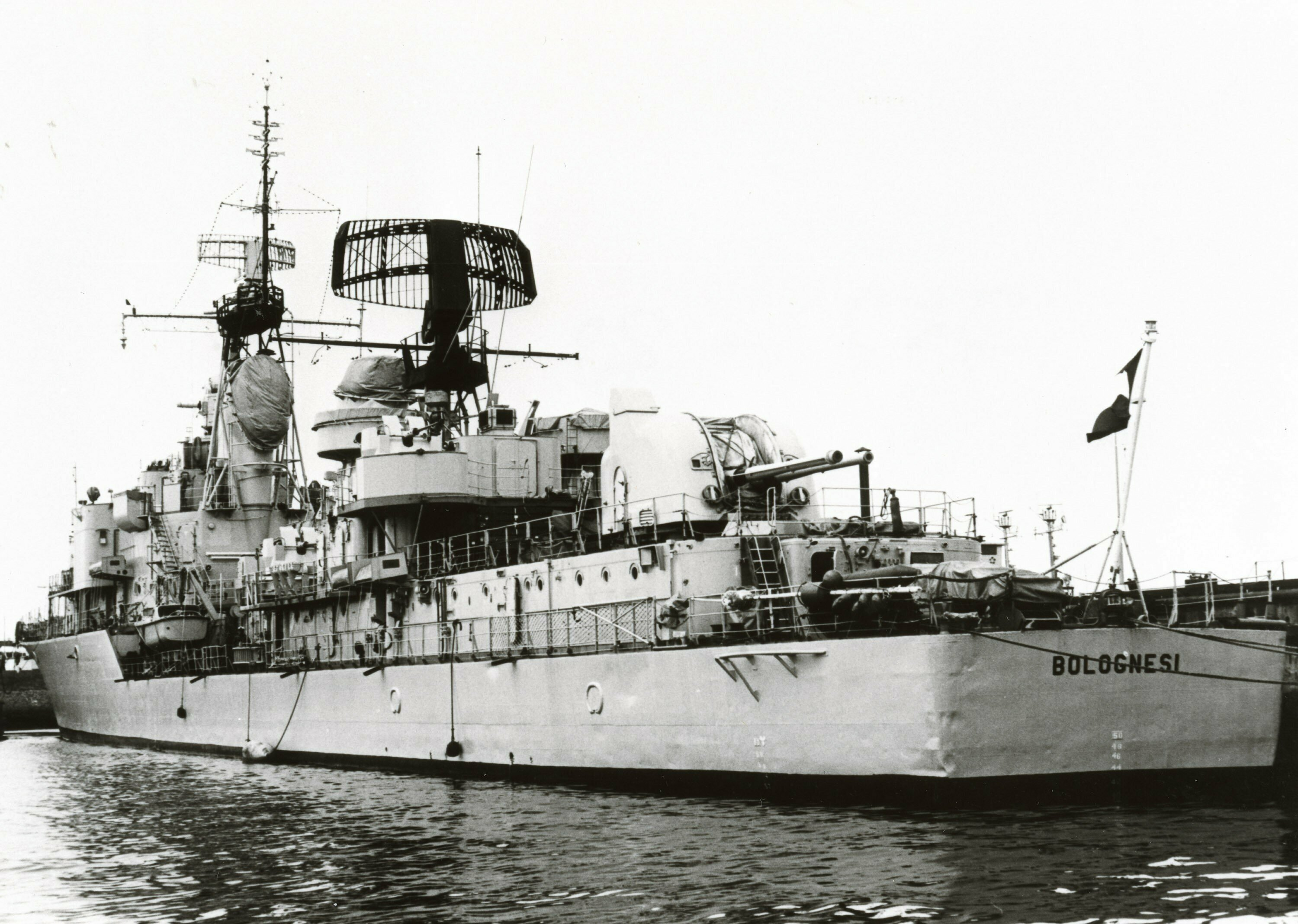
BAP Bolognesi being commissioned in 1982.

The ship was commissioned into the Peruvian Navy on 14 June 1982 where the ship was renamed Coronel Bolognesi (Note: Sometimes listed as simply Bolognesi) with the pennant number 70. The ship was decommissioned in 1990.
