= HNLMS Groningen (D813) =

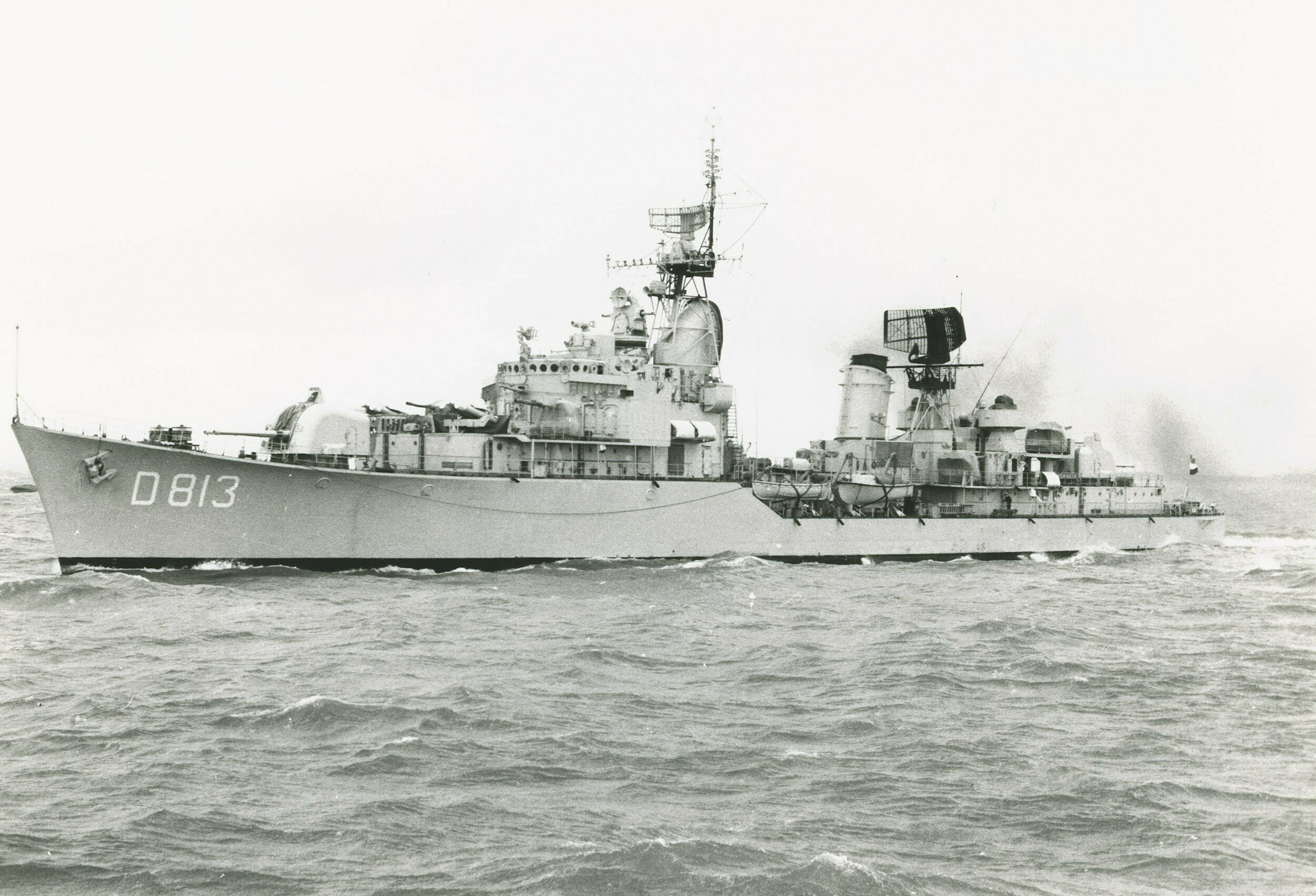
- Groningen in 1961

History

Netherlands
- Name: Groningen
- Namesake: Groningen
- Builder: NDSM, Amsterdam
- Laid down: 21 February 1952
- Launched: 9 January 1954
- Commissioned: 12 September 1956
- Decommissioned: 20 January 1981
- Fate: Sold to the Peruvian Navy

Peru
- Name: Gálvez
- Acquired: 1981
- Decommissioned: 1991
- Identification: DD78
- Status: decommissioned

General characteristics
- Type: Friesland-class destroyer
- Displacement: 2497 standard, 3070 tons full load
- Length: 116 m (381 ft)
- Beam: 11.7 m (38 ft)
- Draught: 5.2 m (17 ft)
- Propulsion: 2 shaft geared turbines, 4 BW boilers, Super-heated steam @ 620psi, 60,000 hp
- Speed: 36 kn (67 km/h; 41 mph)
- Range: 4,000 nmi (7,400 km; 4,600 mi) at 18 kn (33 km/h; 21 mph)
- Complement: 284
- Sensors & processing systems: Radar LW-02, DA-01, ZW-01, M45, Sonar Type PAE 1N, Type CWE 10
- Armament: 4 × Bofors 120 mm guns (2 × 2); 6 × 40mm Bofors AA guns (6 × 1); 8 × 375 mm anti submarine mortars (2 × 4); 2 × depth charge racks

HNLMS Groningen (D813) (Dutch: Hr.Ms. Groningen) was a destroyer of the Friesland class. The ship was in service with the Royal Netherlands Navy from 1956 to 1981. The destroyer was named after the Dutch province of Groningen and was the eleventh ship with this name. In 1981 the ship was taken out of service and sold to Peru where it was renamed Gálvez. The ship's radio call sign was "PACX".

== Dutch service history ==
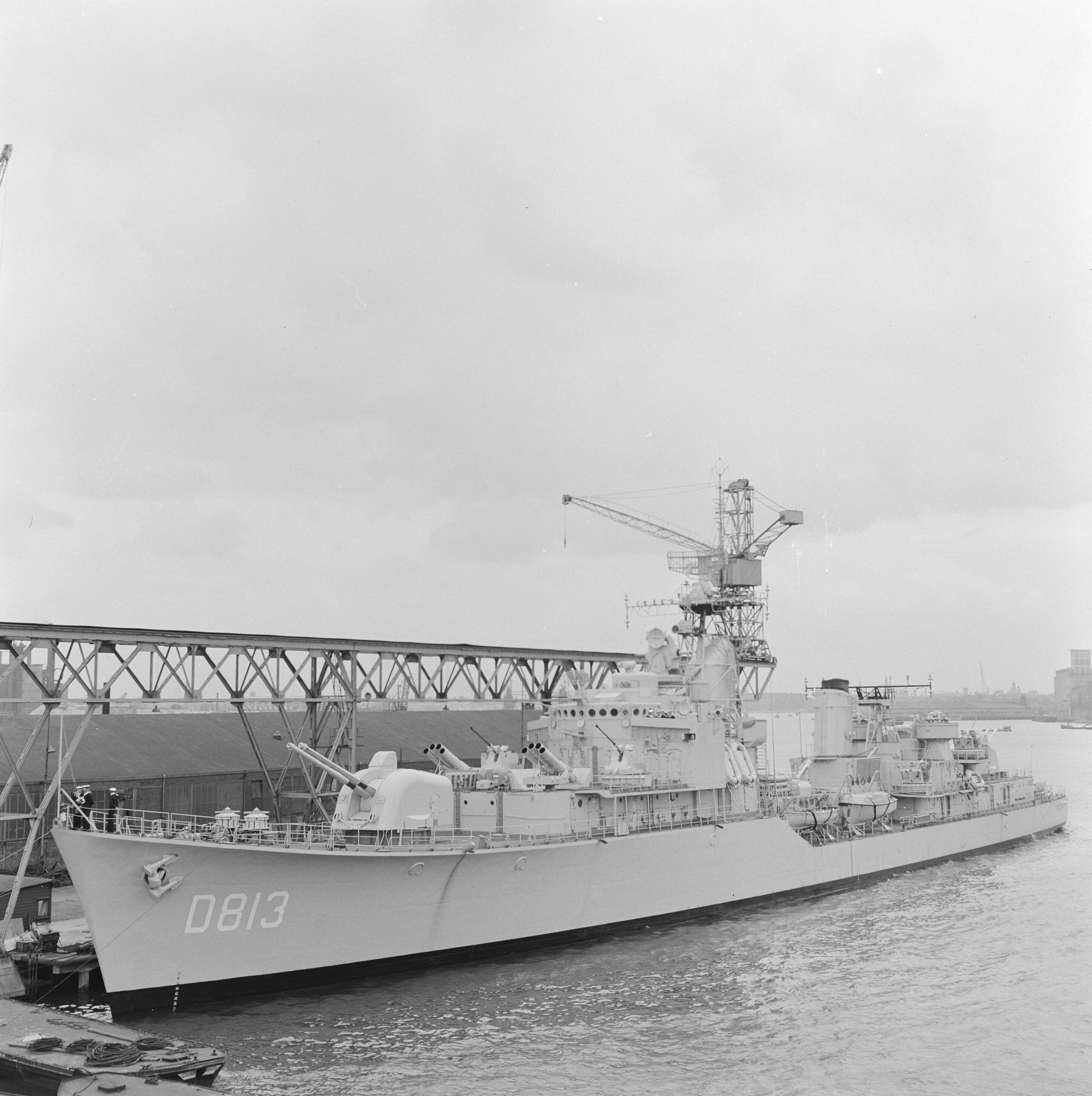
Groningen being commissioned in 1956 at the NDSM shipyards in Amsterdam.

HNLMS Groningen was one of eight Friesland-class destroyers and was built at the NDSM in Amsterdam. The keel laying took place on 21 February 1952 and the launching on 9 January 1954. The ship was put into service on 12 September 1956.

On 8 June 1977 Groningen, with the frigate Tromp, the replenishment ship Poolster and destroyer Overijssel, visited Leningrad. This was the first Dutch squadron to visit Leningrad in twenty one years.

On 20 January 1981 the vessel was decommissioned and sold to the Peruvian Navy.

== Peruvian service history ==
The ship was put into service on 2 March 1981 where the ship was renamed Gálvez and decommissioned in 1991.

== Bibliography ==
- Scheina, Robert L. & Smigielski, Adam (1995). "Peru". In Chumbley, Stephen (ed.). Conway's All the World's Fighting Ships, 1947–1995 (revised ed.). Naval Institute Press. pp. 303–307. ISBN 1-55750-132-7.
