= HNLMS Rotterdam (D818) =

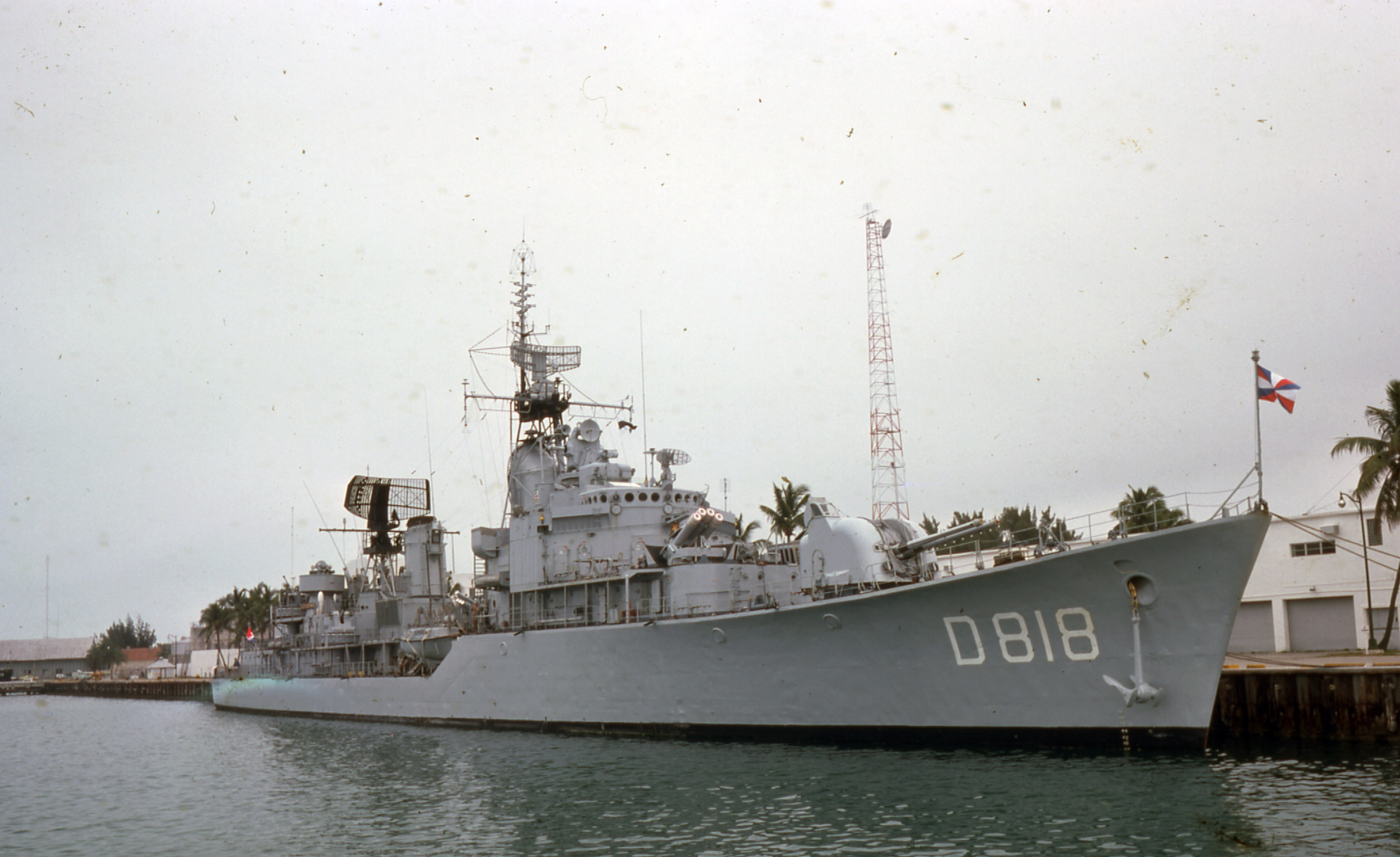
- Rotterdam

History

Netherlands
- Name: Rotterdam
- Namesake: Rotterdam
- Builder: RDM, Rotterdam
- Laid down: 7 January 1954
- Launched: 26 January 1956
- Commissioned: 28 February 1957
- Decommissioned: 15 May 1981
- Fate: Sold to the Peruvian Navy

Peru
- Name: Diez Canseco
- Acquired: 1981
- Decommissioned: 1991
- Identification: DD79
- Status: decommissioned

General characteristics
- Type: Friesland-class destroyer
- Displacement: 2497 standard, 3070 tons full load
- Length: 116 m (381 ft)
- Beam: 11.7 m (38 ft)
- Draught: 5.2 m (17 ft)
- Installed power: 4 BW boilers; 60,000 hp
- Propulsion: 2 shaft geared steam turbines
- Speed: 36 kn (67 km/h; 41 mph)
- Range: 4,000 nmi (7,400 km; 4,600 mi) at 18 kn (33 km/h; 21 mph)
- Complement: 284
- Sensors & processing systems: Radar LW-02, DA-01, ZW-01, M45, Sonar Type PAE 1N, Type CWE 10
- Armament: 4 × Bofors 120 mm guns (2 × 2); 6 × 40mm Bofors AA guns (6 × 1); 8 × 375 mm anti submarine mortars (2 × 4); 2 × depth charge racks

HNLMS Rotterdam (D818) (Dutch: Hr.Ms. Rotterdam) was a destroyer of the Friesland class. The ship was in service with the Royal Netherlands Navy from 1957 to 1981. The destroyer was named after the Dutch city of Rotterdam and was the nineteenth ship with this name. In 1981 the ship was taken out of service and sold to Peru where it was renamed Diez Canseco. The ship's radio call sign was "PAFQ".

== Dutch service history ==
HNLMS Rotterdam was one of eight Friesland-class destroyers and was built at the RDM in Rotterdam. The keel laying took place on 7 January 1954 and the launching on 26 January 1956. The ship was put into service on 28 February 1957.

Rotterdam towed Drenthe to the harbor after a fire had broken out in that ships engine room on 12 November 1980. Two crewman of the Drenthe died during the fire and four were injured. The fire was caused by an attempt to burn paper in the engine room. That day Drenthe was in the Caribbean to relieve Rotterdam as station ship.

On 15 May 1981 the vessel was decommissioned and sold to the Peruvian Navy.

== Peruvian service history ==
The ship was put into service on 29 June 1981 where the ship was renamed Diez Canseco and decommissioned in 1991.

== Bibliography ==
- Scheina, Robert L. & Smigielski, Adam (1995). "Peru". In Chumbley, Stephen (ed.). Conway's All the World's Fighting Ships, 1947–1995 (revised ed.). Naval Institute Press. pp. 303–307. ISBN 1-55750-132-7.
