= HNLMS Utrecht (D817) =

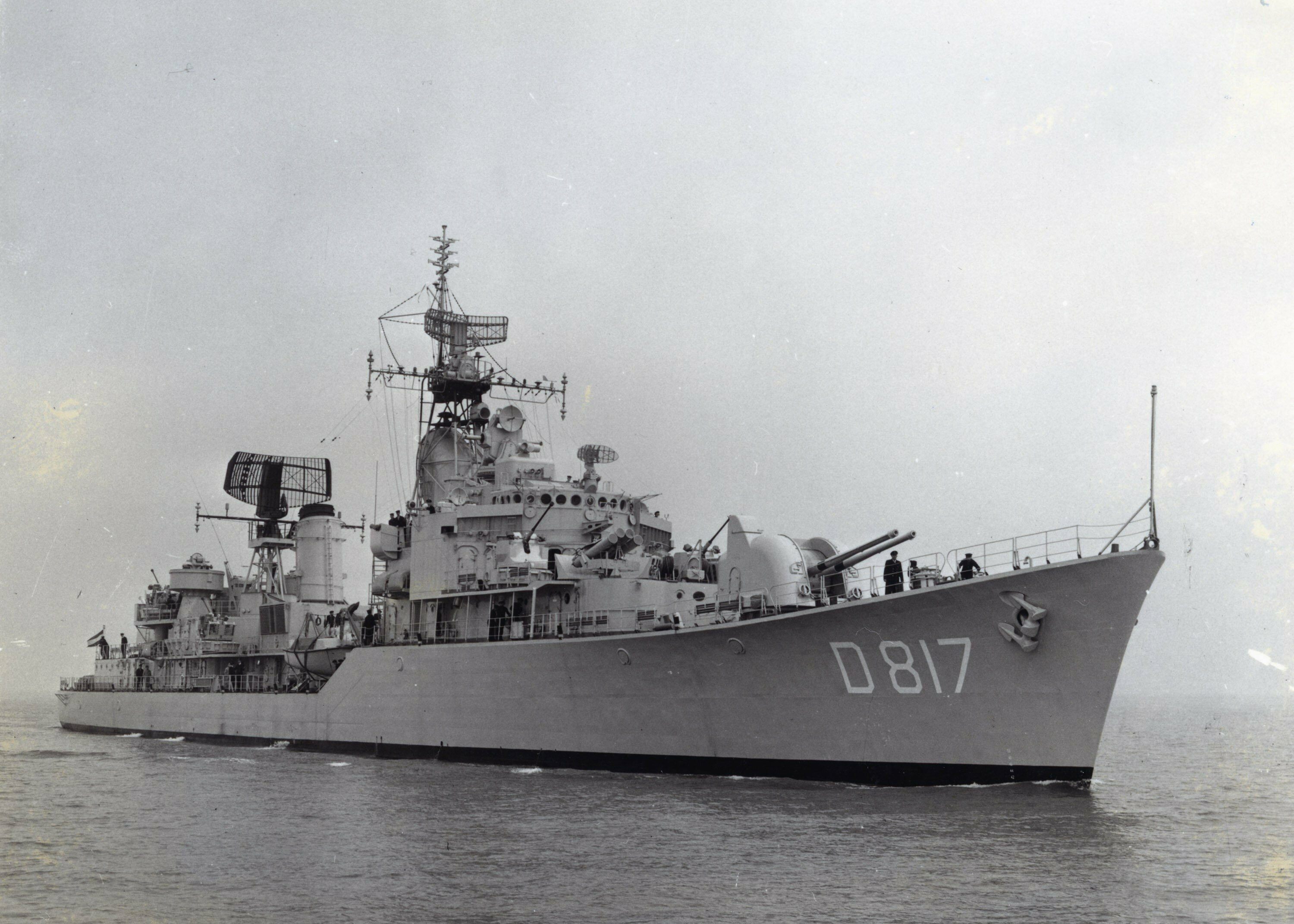
- Utrecht

History

Netherlands
- Name: Utrecht
- Namesake: Utrecht
- Builder: KM de Schelde, Vlissingen
- Laid down: 15 February 1954
- Launched: 2 June 1956
- Commissioned: 1 October 1957
- Decommissioned: 15 August 1980
- Fate: Sold to the Peruvian Navy

Peru
- Name: Castilla
- Acquired: 1980
- Decommissioned: 1990
- Identification: DD71
- Status: decommissioned

General characteristics
- Type: Friesland-class destroyer
- Displacement: 2497 standard, 3070 tons full load
- Length: 116 m (381 ft)
- Beam: 11.7 m (38 ft)
- Draught: 5.2 m (17 ft)
- Propulsion: 2 shaft geared turbines, 4 BW boilers, Super-heated steam @ 620psi, 60,000 hp
- Speed: 36 kn (67 km/h; 41 mph)
- Range: 4,000 nmi (7,400 km; 4,600 mi) at 18 kn (33 km/h; 21 mph)
- Complement: 284
- Sensors & processing systems: Radar LW-02, DA-01, ZW-01, M45, Sonar Type PAE 1N, Type CWE 10
- Armament: 4 × Bofors 120 mm guns (2 × 2); 6 × 40mm Bofors AA guns (6 × 1); 8 × 375 mm anti submarine mortars (2 × 4); 2 × depth charge racks

HNLMS Utrecht (D817) (Dutch: Hr.Ms. Utrecht) was a destroyer of the Friesland class. The ship was in service with the Royal Netherlands Navy from 1957 to 1980. The destroyer was named after the Dutch province of Utrecht and was the eighteenth ship with this name. In 1980 the ship was taken out of service and sold to Peru where it was renamed Castilla. The ship's radio call sign was "PAEY".

== Dutch service history ==
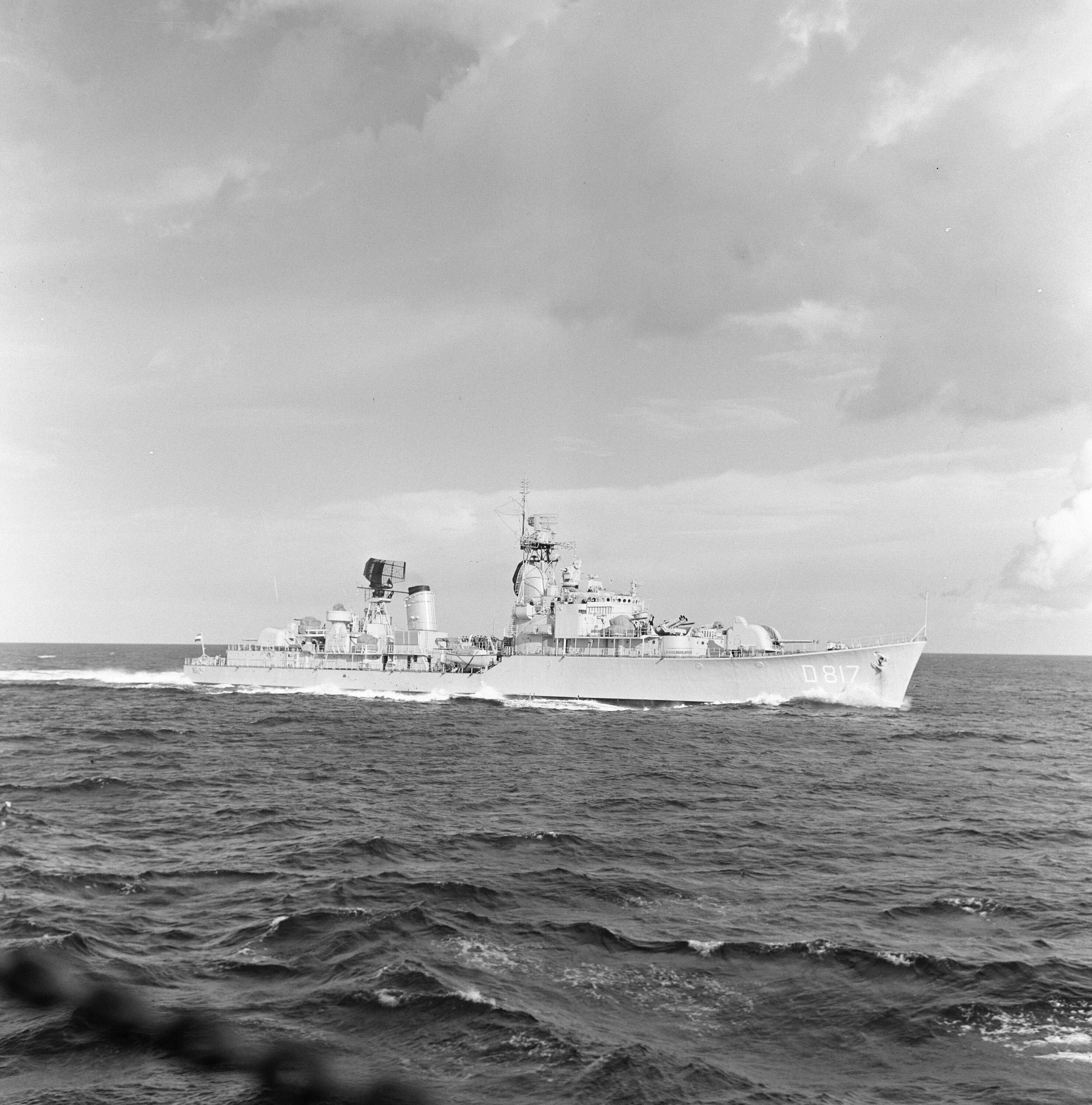
Utrecht in 1959

HNLMS Utrecht was one of eight Friesland-class destroyers and was built at the KM de Schelde in Vlissingen. The keel laying took place on 15 February 1954 and the launching on 2 June 1956. The ship was put into service on 1 October 1957.

In 1959 the ship received eight torpedo tubes so it could use the British MK 20E torpedo. After a few years these were removed however, because the Dutch navy favored American torpedoes.

In 1962 during the West New Guinea dispute Utrecht and the frigate Evertsen engaged Proa’s and fast attack craft in the Battle of Arafura Sea.

On 1 August 1980 the vessel was decommissioned and sold to the Peruvian Navy.

== Peruvian service history ==
The ship was put into service on 6 October 1980 where the ship was renamed Castilla and decommissioned in 1990.

== Bibliography ==
- Scheina, Robert L. & Smigielski, Adam (1995). "Peru". In Chumbley, Stephen (ed.). Conway's All the World's Fighting Ships, 1947–1995 (revised ed.). Naval Institute Press. pp. 303–307. ISBN 1-55750-132-7.
