= Friesland-class destroyer =

Ship class for the Royal Netherlands Navy

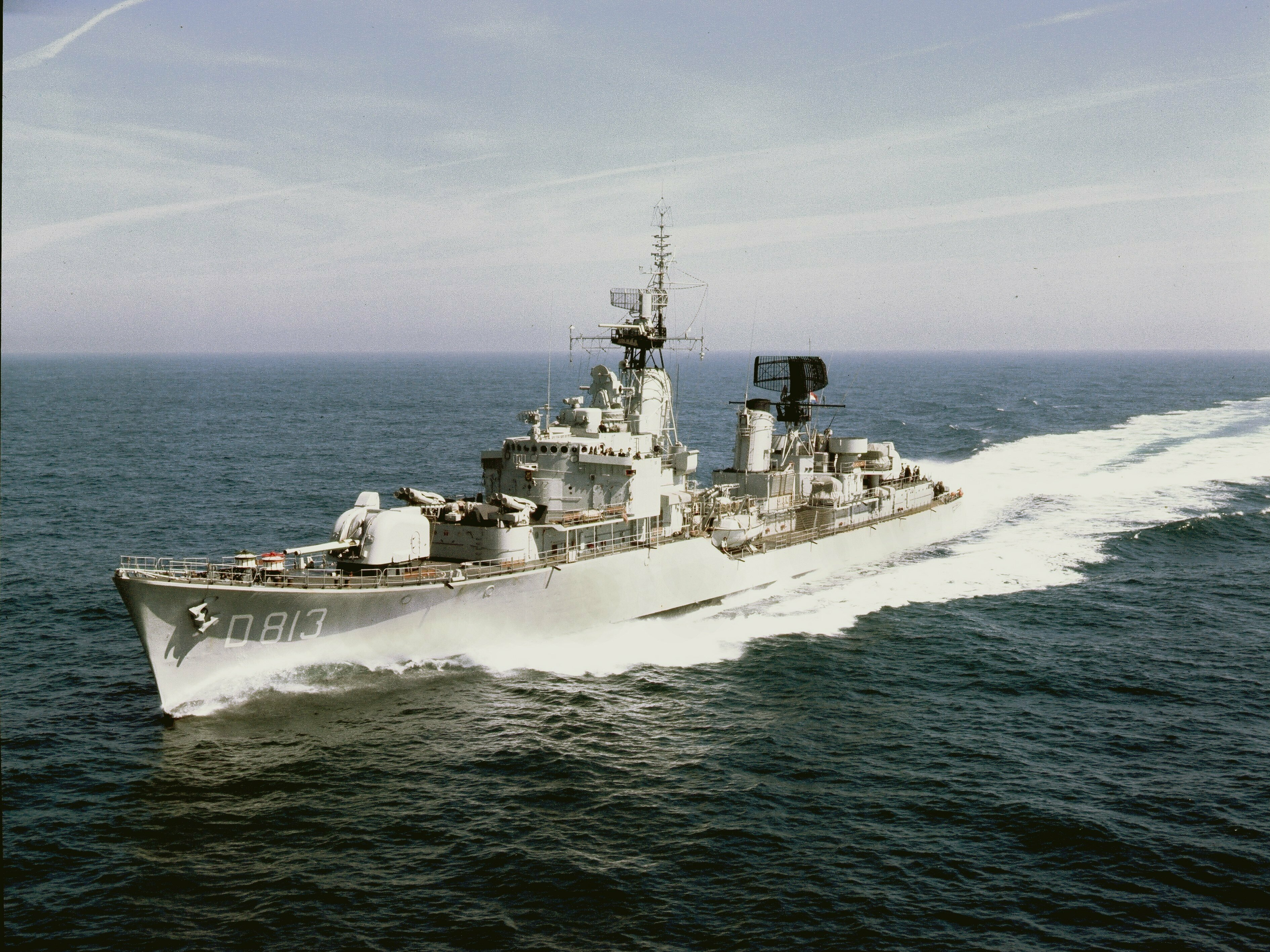
- Friesland-class destroyer HNLMS Groningen

Class overview
- Name: Friesland class
- Operators: Royal Netherlands Navy; Peruvian Navy
- Preceded by: Holland class
- Built: 1951-1958
- In commission: 1956-1991
- Completed: 8
- Retired: 8

General characteristics
- Type: Destroyer
- Displacement: 2497 standard, 3070 tons full load
- Length: 116 m (381 ft)
- Beam: 11.7 m (38 ft)
- Draught: 5.2 m (17 ft)
- Propulsion: 2 shaft geared turbines, 4 BW boilers, Super-heated steam @ 620psi, 60,000 hp
- Speed: 36 kn (67 km/h; 41 mph)
- Range: 4,000 nmi (7,400 km; 4,600 mi) at 18 kn (33 km/h; 21 mph)
- Complement: 284
- Sensors & processing systems: Radar LW-02, DA-01, ZW-01, M45, Sonar Type PAE 1N, Type CWE 10
- Armament: 4 × Bofors 120 mm guns (2 × 2); 6 × 40mm Bofors AA guns (6 × 1); 8 × Bofors 375 mm (14.8 in) anti-submarine rockets (2 × 4); 2 × depth charge racks

The Friesland-class destroyers (Note: In the Dutch navy the ships where classified as "onderzeebootjagers" literally translated: submarine hunters.) were built for the Royal Netherlands Navy in the 1950s. They were a larger modified version of the Holland class with more powerful machinery. Eight ships were built. They were replaced by the Kortenaer-class frigates in the early 1980s and seven ships were sold to the Peruvian Navy where they served until 1991. The main armament was supplied by Bofors.

The machinery was identical to that used in the American Gearing-class destroyers and manufactured under licence by Werkspoor. The radar was manufactured by Hollandse Signaalapparaten.

== Background ==
After World War II, the Royal Netherlands Navy had to be rebuilt. There were different visions about what the navy should look like, opinions on the subject - or fantasies - diverged. One of the plans was based on the Royal Netherlands Navy having no less than 48 submarine destroyers. That number, however, was quickly scaled back. For the 1947 budget, funds were included for the first time for the new ships: the so-called "Submarine Destroyer 1947". In 1948 six ships of these Holland-class destroyers were ordered, but only 4 would eventually be built. In 1948 it was announced that the Dutch navy would purchase, alongside the four "Holland-class" ships, another eight submarine destroyers. In September 1948, a new improved design was made on basis of the Holland-class destroyers, this design was at the time called "Submarine Destroyer 1949" and would later be known as the Friesland-class destroyer. Like the Holland-class destroyers the Friesland-class destroyers were designed by engineer K. de Munter, who was employed at the Bureau Scheepsbouw which fell directly under the Dutch Ministry of the Navy.

== Service history ==
The destroyers of the Friesland class regularly operated with the Karel Doorman and together formed an ASW-Hunter-Killer-Group.

== Ships ==
In contrast to previous Dutch Navy practice the ships were named after provinces or cities rather than admirals.

Name	Pennant number	Builder	Laid down	Launched	Commissioned	Fate
Friesland	D812	NDSM, Amsterdam	17 December 1951	21 February 1953	22 March 1956	Broken up 1979
Groningen	D813	NDSM, Amsterdam	21 February 1952	9 January 1954	12 September 1956	Sold to the Peruvian Navy 1980 as BAP Gálvez
Limburg	D814	KM de Schelde, Vlissingen	28 November 1953	5 September 1955	31 October 1956	Sold to the Peruvian Navy 1980 as BAP Capitan Quiñones
Overijssel	D815	Wilton-Fijenoord, Schiedam	15 October 1953	8 August 1955	4 October 1957	Sold to the Peruvian Navy 1982 as BAP Colonel Bolognesi
Drenthe	D816	NDSM, Amsterdam	9 January 1954	26 March 1955	1 August 1957	Sold to the Peruvian Navy 1981 as BAP Guise
Utrecht	D817	KM de Schelde, Vlissingen	15 February 1954	2 June 1956	1 October 1957	Sold to the Peruvian Navy 1980 as BAP Castilla
Rotterdam	D818	RDM, Rotterdam	7 January 1954	26 January 1956	28 February 1957	Sold to the Peruvian Navy 1981 as BAP Diez Canseco
Amsterdam	D819	NDSM, Amsterdam	25 March 1955	25 August 1956	10 April 1958	Sold to the Peruvian Navy 1980 as BAP Villar

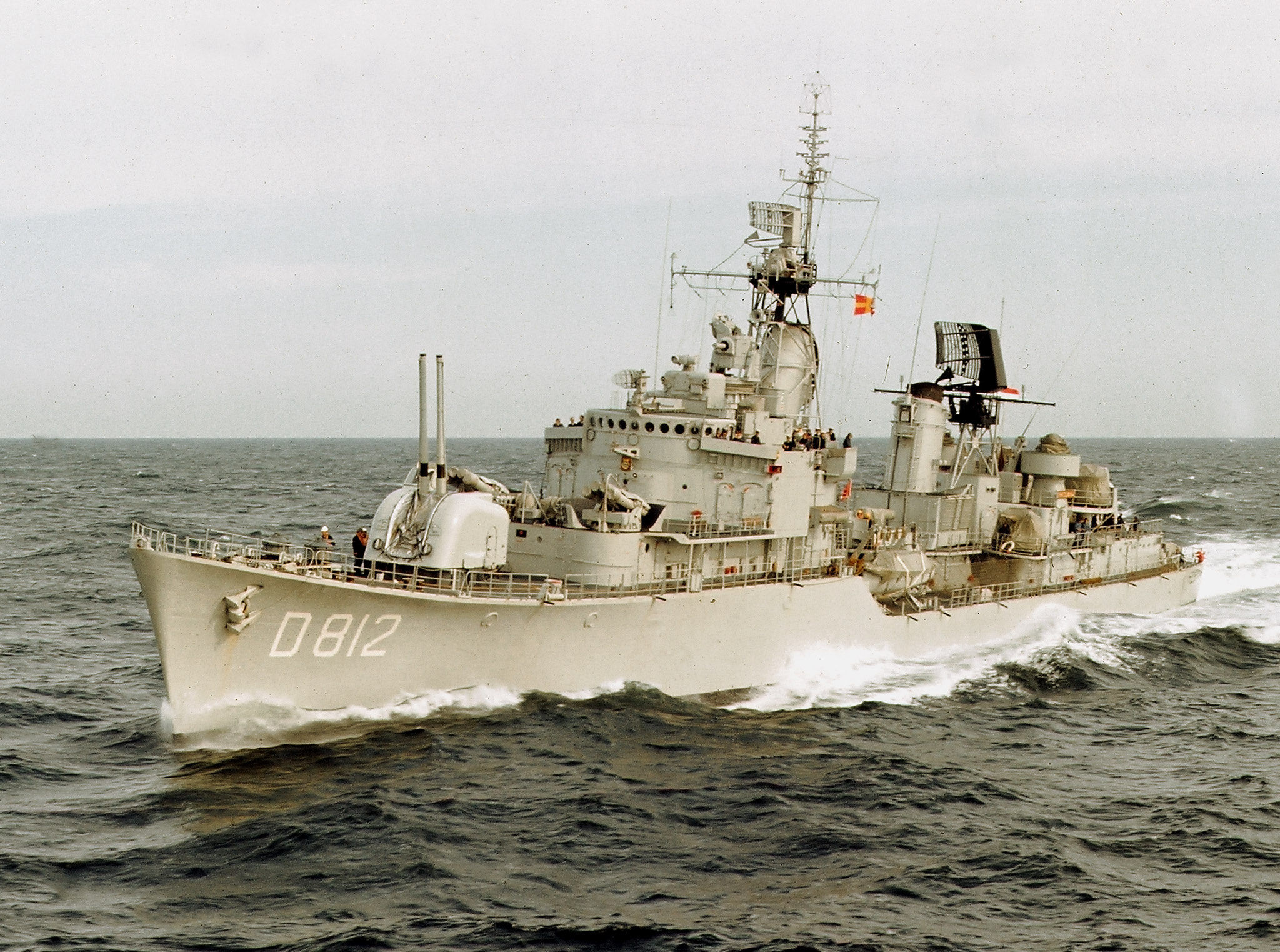
Friesland bron: Koninklijke Marine

== See also ==
- List of destroyers of the Netherlands

Equivalent destroyers of the same era

- T 47 class
- Daring class
- Akizuki class
- Halland class
- Impetuoso class
- Forrest Sherman class
- Kotlin class
- Hamburg class

== Notes ==
Citations

Bibliography

- Conway's All the World's Fighting Ships 1947-1995
- W.H.E., van Amstel (1991). De schepen van de Koninklijke Marine vanaf 1945. Alkmaar: De Alk. ISBN 9060139976.
- Mark, Chris (2005). Onderzeebootjagers van de Holland- en Friesland-klasse. Amsterdam: Stichting Vrienden van de Koninklijke Marine. ISBN 9051230044.
- Mark, Chris (2006). De geschiedenis van Hr. Ms. Drenthe. Amsterdam: Stichting Vrienden van de Koninklijke Marine.
