= List of ship commissionings in 1967 =

The list of ship commissionings in 1967 includes a chronological list of all ships commissioned in 1967.

	Operator	Ship	Flag	Class and type	Pennant	Other notes
21 January	United States Navy	Biddle		Belknap-class cruiser	CG-34	
1 March	Royal Netherlands Navy	Van Galen		Van Speijk-class frigate	F803	
15 March	Swedish Lloyd	Patricia	Sweden	ferry		
1 April	United States Navy	Camden		Sacramento-class fast combat support ship	AOE-2	
14 April	Royal Netherlands Navy	Van Speijk		Van Speijk-class frigate	F802	
15 April	United States Navy	Horne		Belknap-class cruiser	CG-30	
26 April	Black Sea Shipping Company	Taras Shevchenko	Soviet Union	Ivan Franko-class passenger ship		
29 April	United States Navy	Niagara Falls		Mars-class combat stores ship	AFS-3	
2 June	DFDS Seaways	Winston Churchill	Denmark	ferry		
15 June	Polferries	Gryf	Poland	ferry		Ex-Finndana, with TT-Line and Finnlines
9 August	Royal Netherlands Navy	Van Nes		Van Speijk-class frigate	F805	
16 August	Royal Netherlands Navy	Tjerk Hiddes		Van Speijk-class frigate	F804	
1 September	United States Navy	Dubuque		Austin-class amphibious transport dock	LPD-8	
21 December	Royal Netherlands Navy	Evertsen		Van Speijk-class frigate	F815	
Date uncertain	Spanish Navy	Dédalo		Independence-class aircraft carrier		Ex-USS Cabot
Date uncertain	La Traverse Nord-Sud Ltd	Manic	Canada	ferry		Ex-Apollo for Rederi AB Slite (in Viking Line traffic)
