= HNLMS Evertsen =

Eight ships of the Royal Netherlands Navy have been named HNLMS Evertsen, after a family from Zeeland with many sea heroes:

- Admiral Evertsen (1803–1814), cannon schooner;
- Admiral Evertsen (1808–1819), ship-of-the-line;
- HNLMS Evertsen (1857), frigate with additional steam power, renamed Neptunus (Neptune);
- HNLMS Evertsen (1894), armored ship;
- HNLMS Evertsen (1926) (1926–1942), torpedo-boat destroyer;
- HNLMS Evertsen (F803) (1946–1962), ex-HMS Scourge, S-class destroyer;
- HNLMS Evertsen (F815) (1967–1989), Van Speijk-class frigate;
- HNLMS Evertsen (F805) (2005–present), De Zeven Provinciën-class frigate.
