= HNLMS Van Speijk (F802) =

1965 Van Speijk-class frigate

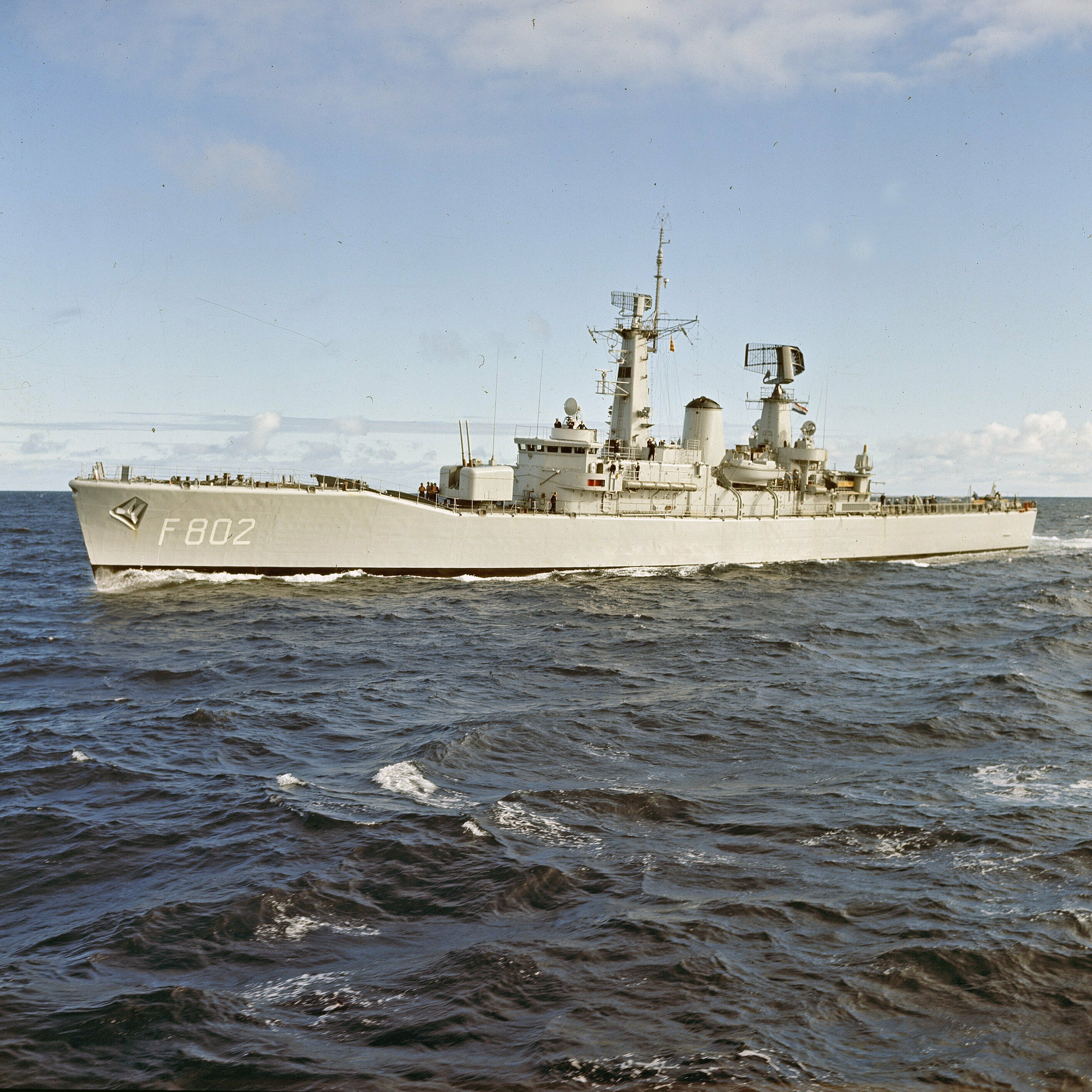
- HNMLS Van Speijk before her Midlife Modernization program

History

Netherlands
- Name: Van Speijk
- Namesake: Jan van Speyk
- Builder: NDSM, Amsterdam
- Laid down: 1 October 1963
- Launched: 5 March 1965
- Commissioned: 14 February 1967
- Decommissioned: 1986
- Identification: Pennant number: F802; Code letters: PAVA
- Fate: Sold to the Indonesian Navy 11 February 1986

Indonesia
- Name: Slamet Riyadi
- Namesake: Slamet Riyadi
- Acquired: 11 February 1986
- Commissioned: 1 November 1986
- Decommissioned: 16 August 2019
- Identification: Pennant number: 352
- Fate: Sunk as a target ship 31 July 2023

General characteristics
- Class & type: Van Speijk class; Ahmad Yani class
- Displacement: 2,200 tons standard, 2,850 tons full load
- Length: 113.4 m (372 ft)
- Beam: 12.5 m (41 ft)
- Draught: 5.8 m (19 ft)
- Propulsion: As built; 2 x Babcock & Wilcox boilers; 2 x Werkspoor/English Electric steam turbines; 22,370 kW (30,000 shp); 2 x shafts; Rebuild; 2 x Caterpillar 3616 diesels; 10,900 kW (14,600 shp); 2 x shafts
- Speed: 28.5 kn (52.8 km/h; 32.8 mph); With new diesels - estimated max. 24 kn (44 km/h; 28 mph)
- Range: 4,500 nmi (8,300 km; 5,200 mi) at 12 kn (22 km/h; 14 mph)
- Complement: 180
- Sensors & processing systems: Radar: LW-03, DA-02, M45, M44; Sonar: Types 170B, 162; Combat system: SEWACO V
- Armament: as Slamet Riyadi; 1 × OTO Melara 76 mm gun; 4 × 12.7 mm DShK MGs; 2 × twin Simbad launcher for Mistral SAMs; 4 × C-802 SSM; 2 × 3 – Mk 32 anti submarine torpedo tubes
- Aircraft carried: one NBO-105C
- Aviation facilities: Hangar

HNLMS Van Speijk (F802) (Dutch: Hr.Ms. Van Speijk) was a frigate of the Van Speijk class. The ship was in service with the Royal Netherlands Navy from 1967 to 1986. The ship's radio call sign was "PAVA". She was sold to the Indonesian Navy where the ship was renamed KRI Slamet Riyadi (352). The ship was decommissioned in 2019.

== Design and construction ==
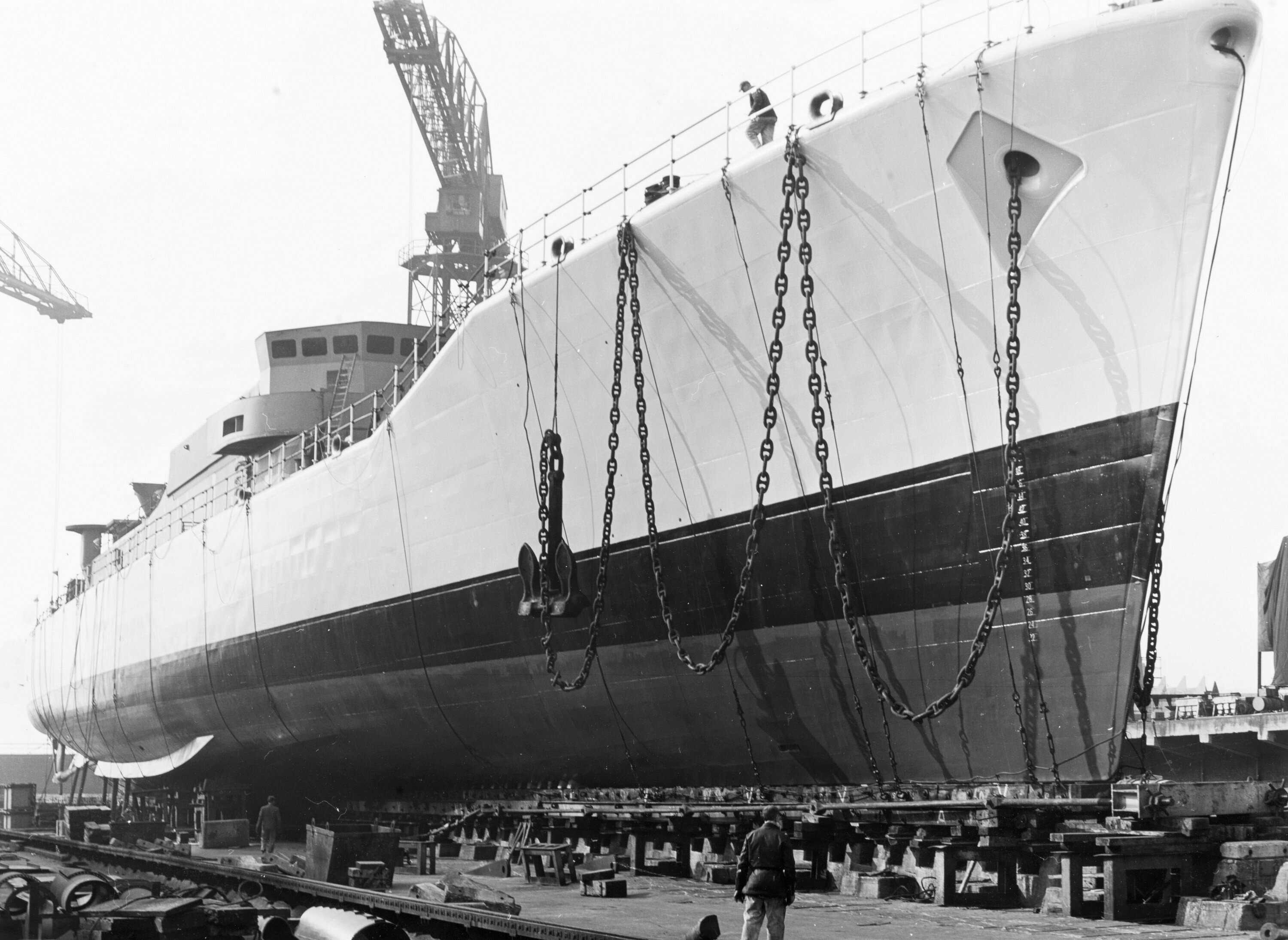
Under construction in 1965

In the early 1960s, the Royal Netherlands Navy had an urgent requirement to replace its Van Amstel-class frigates, obsolete ex-American escorts built during the Second World War. To meet this requirement, it chose to build a modified version of the British Leander-class frigate as its Van Speijk class, using broadly the same armament as the original design, but where possible, substituting Dutch electronics and radars.

The Van Speijks were 113.4 m (372 ft) long overall and 109.7 m (360 ft) between perpendiculars, with a beam of 12.5 m (41 ft) and a draught of 5.8 m (19 ft). Displacement was 2,200 long tons (2,200 t) standard and 2,850 long tons (2,900 t) full load. Two Babcock & Wilcox boilers supplied steam to two sets of Werkspoor-English Electric double reduction geared steam turbines rated at 30,000 shp (22,000 kW) and driving two propeller shafts. This gave a speed of 28.5 kn (32.8 mph; 52.8 km/h).

A twin 4.5-inch (113 mm) Mark 6 gun mount was fitted forward. Anti-aircraft defence was provided by two quadruple Sea Cat surface-to-air missile launchers on the hangar roof. A Limbo anti-submarine mortar was fitted aft to provide a short-range anti-submarine capability, while a hangar and helicopter deck allowed a single Westland Wasp helicopter to be operated, for longer range anti-submarine and anti-surface operations.

As built, Van Speijk was fitted with a Signaal LW-03 long range air search radar on the ship's mainmast, with a DA02 medium range air/surface surveillance radar carried on the ship's foremast. M44 and M45 fire control radars were provided for the Seacat missiles and ships guns respectively. The ship had a sonar suite of Type 170B attack sonar and Type 162 bottom search sonar. The ship had a crew of 251, later reduced to 180.

=== Modifications ===
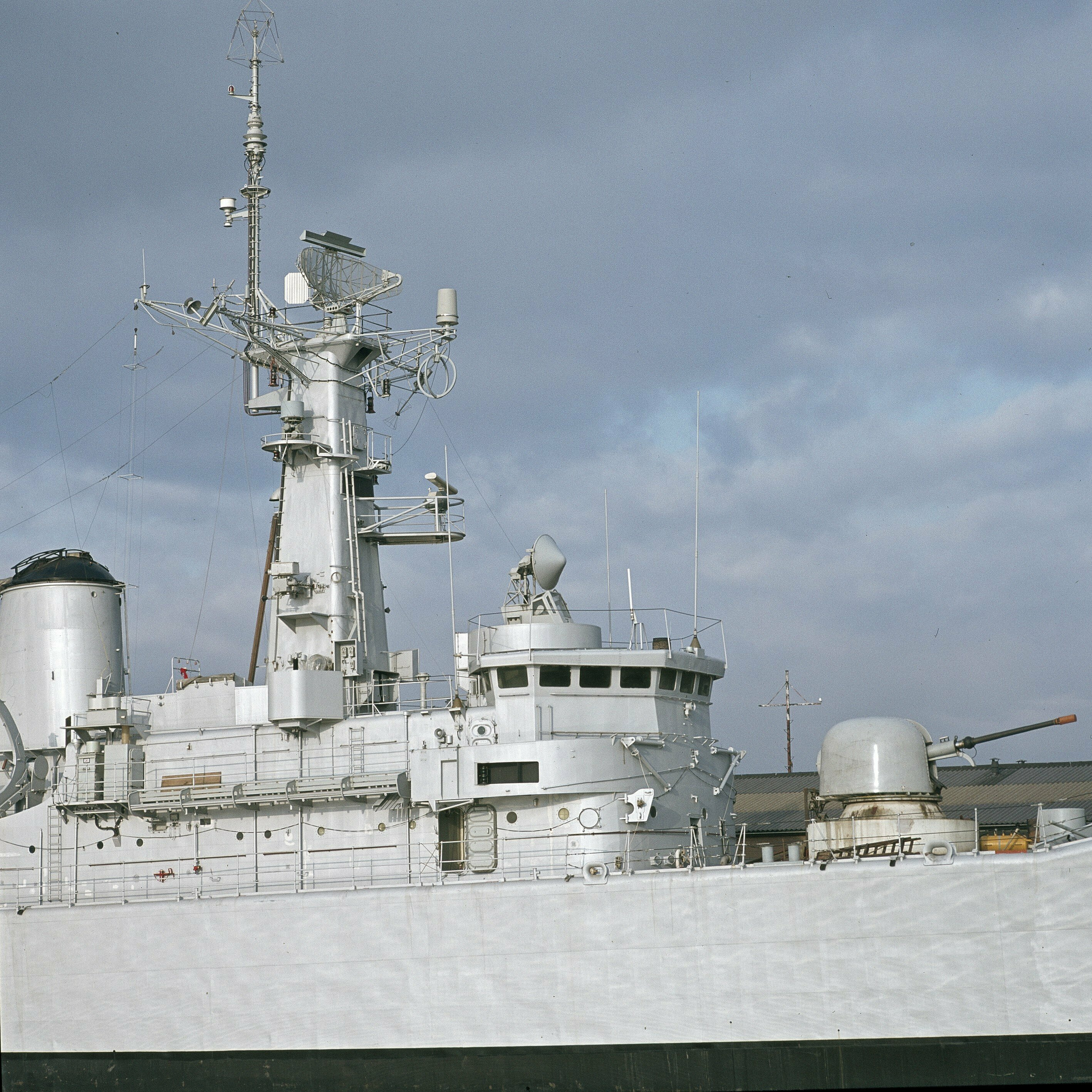
Closer view of the bridge of the upgraded ship; most notable is the round profile single-barrel turret for the OTO Melara 76 mm cannon which replaced the dual 4.5-inch guns housed in a rectangular turret.

All six Van Speijks were modernised in the 1970s, using many of the systems used by the new Kortenaer-class frigates. The 4.5-inch gun was replaced by a single OTO Melara 76 mm and launchers for up to eight Harpoon anti-ship missiles fitted (although only two were normally carried). The hangar and flight deck were enlarged, allowing a Westland Lynx helicopter to be carried, while the Limbo mortar was removed, with a pair of triple Mk 32 torpedo launchers providing close-in anti-submarine armament. A Signaal DA03 radar replaced the DA02 radar and an American EDO Corporation CWE-610 sonar replaced the original British sonar. Van Speijk was modernised at the Den Helder naval dockyard between 24 December 1976 and 3 January 1979.

== Dutch service history ==
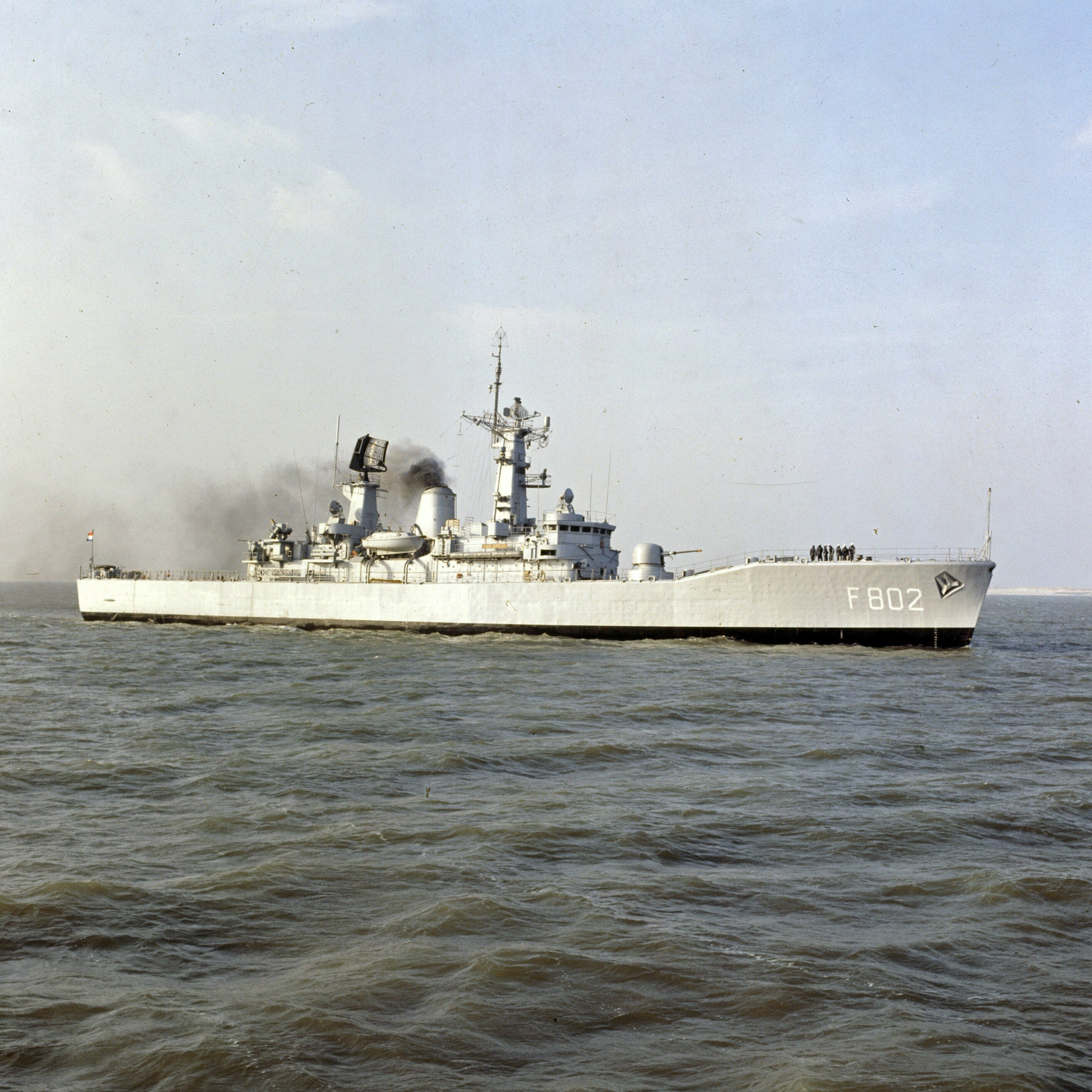
The Van Speijk after modernisation.

An order for four Van Speijks was placed in 1962, with two more ordered in 1964. Van Speijk herself was laid down at the Amsterdam shipyard of Nederlandsche Dok en Scheepsbouw Maatschappij on 1 October 1963 and was launched on 5 March 1965. The ship was completed and entered service on 14 February 1967 with the pennant number F802.

In 1970 Van Speijk was sent, together with the Van Galen, on a journey to the Far East.

The ship received a mid-life modernization in Den Helder, starting on 24 December 1976 and lasting till 3 January 1979.

8 February 1982 the ship together with the frigates Tromp, Callenburgh, Piet Hein, the destroyer Overijssel and the replenishment ship Zuiderkruis departed from Den Helder for a trip to the USA to show the flag and for 200 years diplomatic relations. The ships returned to Den Helder on 19 May 1982.

From 1983 to 1984 Van Speijk served as stationship in the Netherlands Antilles.

In 1986, she was put up for sale along with sister ships Tjerk Hiddes, Van Galen and Van Nes. The four ships then were purchased by Indonesia. Van Speijk was decommissioned in early 1986 and transferred to the Indonesian Navy on 1 November 1986.

== Indonesian service history ==
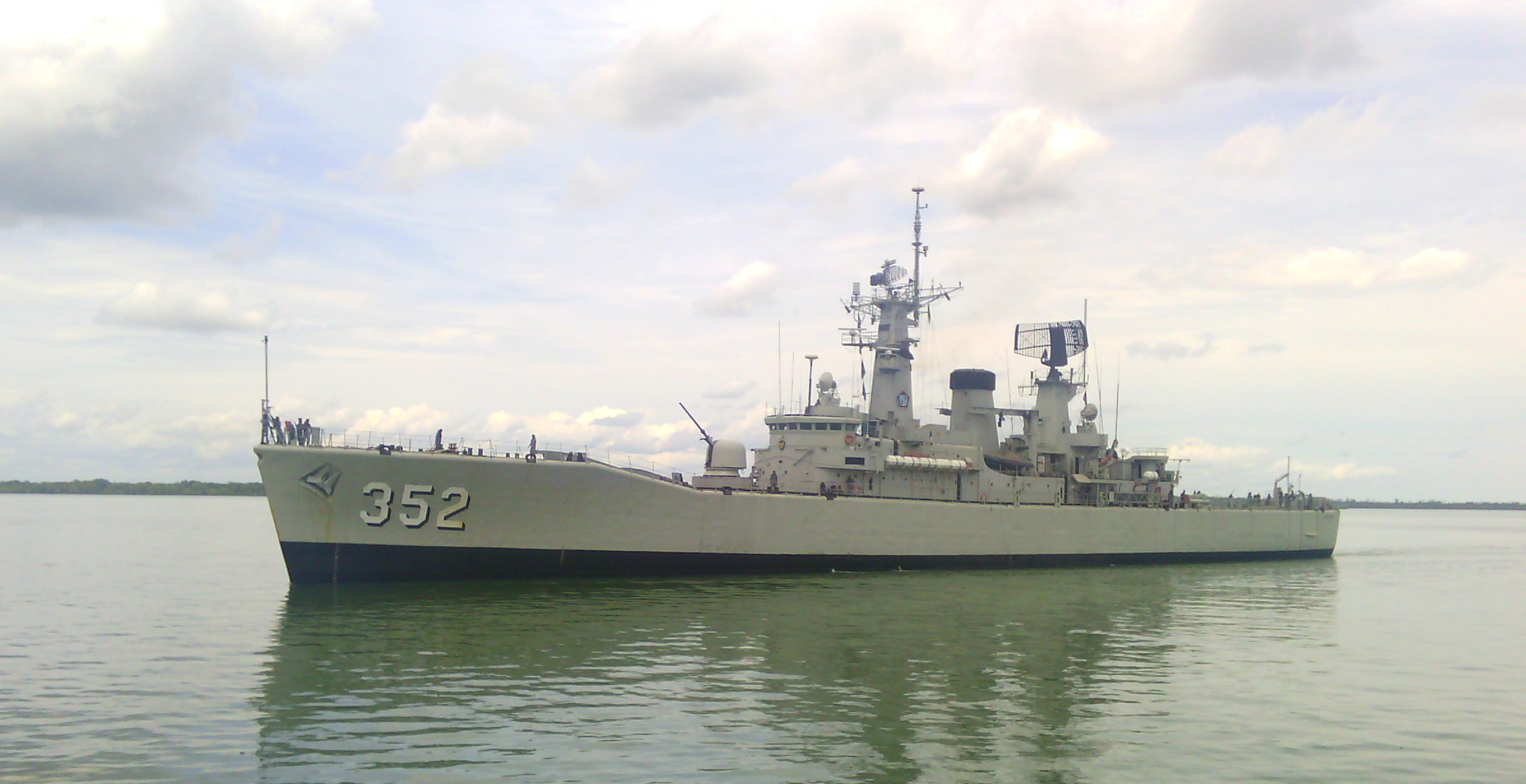
KRI Slamet Riyadi in Laut Strait, 12 December 2014

On 11 February 1986, Indonesia and the Netherlands signed an agreement for transfer of two Van Speijk class with option on two more ships. The ship was transferred to Indonesia on 1 November 1986 and renamed KRI Slamet Riyadi on joining the Indonesian Navy, with the pennant number 352.

By 2002, the ships Seacat missiles were inoperable and it was reported that propulsion problems were badly effecting the availability of the ships of this class. Slamet Riyadi was then modernized by PT Tesco Indomaritim, which was completed in 2008. The ship's Seacat launchers were replaced by two Simbad twin launchers for Mistral anti-aircraft missiles, and she was re-engined with two 10.9 megawatts (14,600 shp) Caterpillar 3616 diesel engines. As the Indonesian Navy retired Harpoon missile from its stockpiles, Slamet Riyadi was rearmed with Chinese C-802 missiles.

Slamet Riyadi was decommissioned on 16 August 2019, along with five other ships of the Indonesian Navy.

After she was decommissioned, her OTO Melara 76 mm gun system is reused for naval gunnery training at naval weapons range in Paiton, Probolinggo Regency, East Java. In June 2020, the ship's hulk were planned to be sunk offshore on Karangasem Regency, Bali to be utilized as a diving attraction.

=== Sinking as target ship ===
The ship was sunk as a target ship in the Java Sea on 31 July 2023 during the Indonesian National Armed Forces's Joint Exercise 2023 (Latgab 23). It was hit by two Exocet surface-to-surface missiles (SSM) from KRI Raden Eddy Martadinata and KRI John Lie, one C-802 SSM from KRI Yos Sudarso, one C-705 SSM from KRI Tombak, and finally four M117 bombs dropped by two Indonesian Air Force F-16s (two bombs each.) The ship broke into at least three parts and sank.

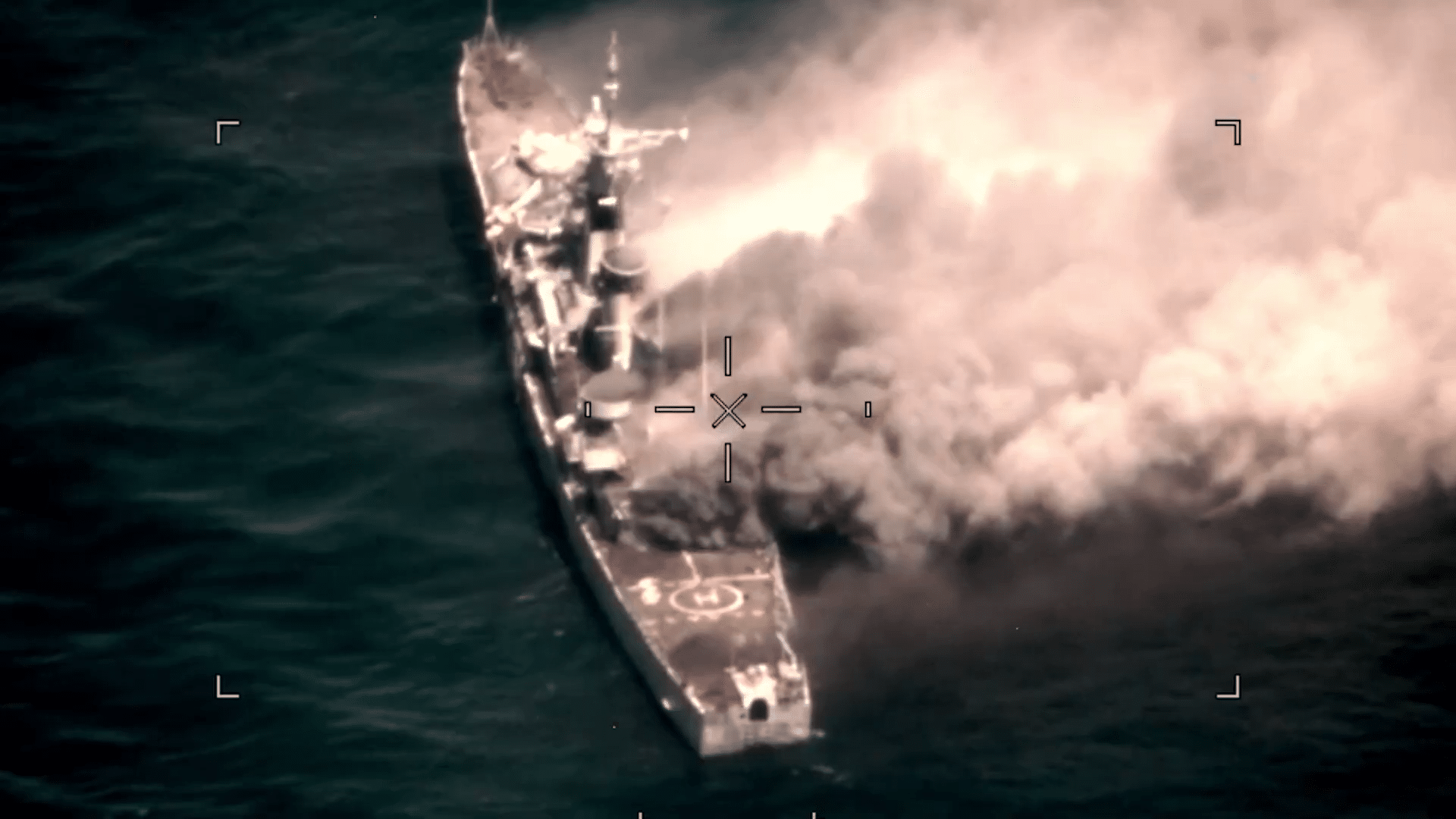
Fires following missile hits.

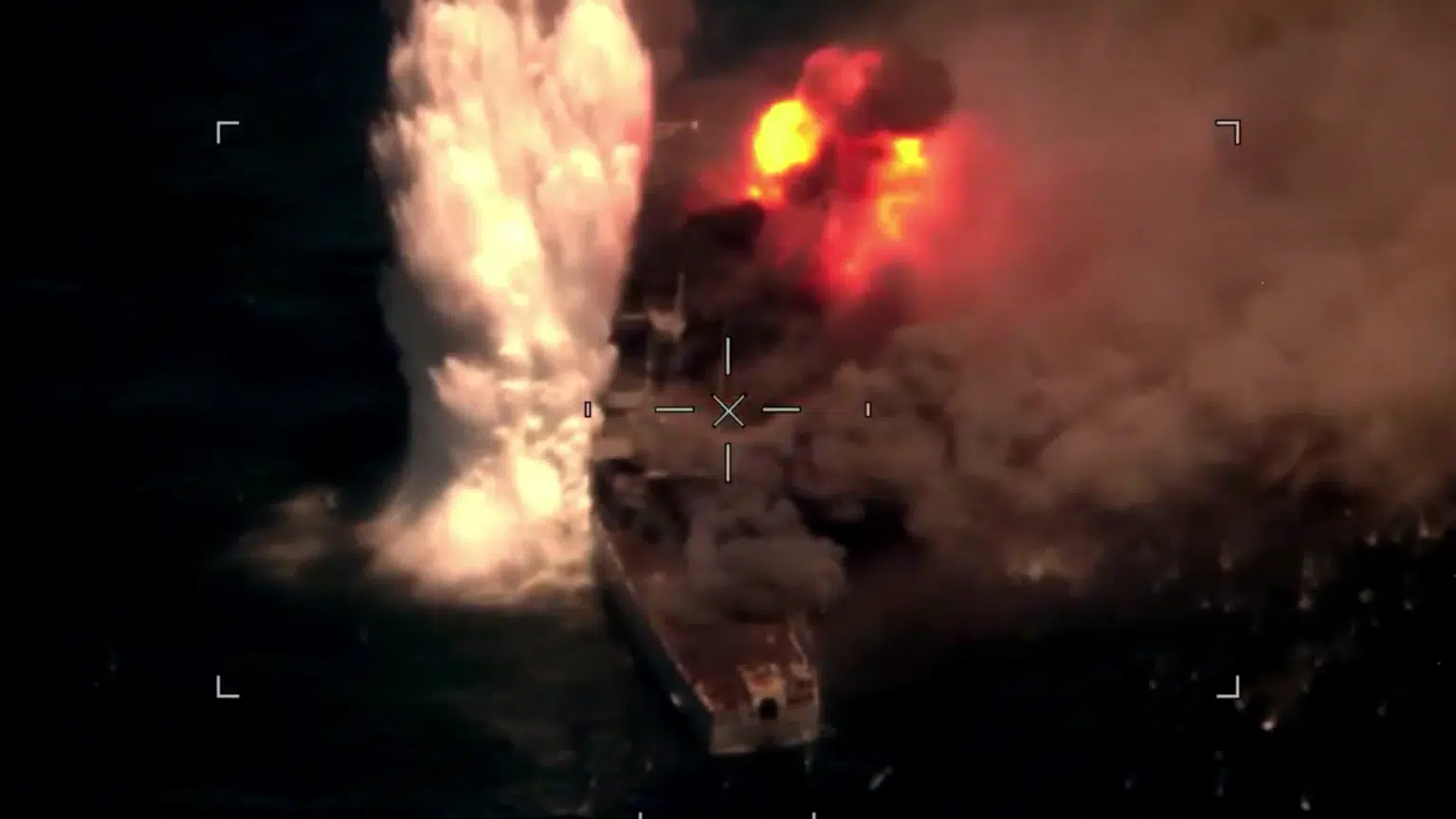
Bomb impacts.

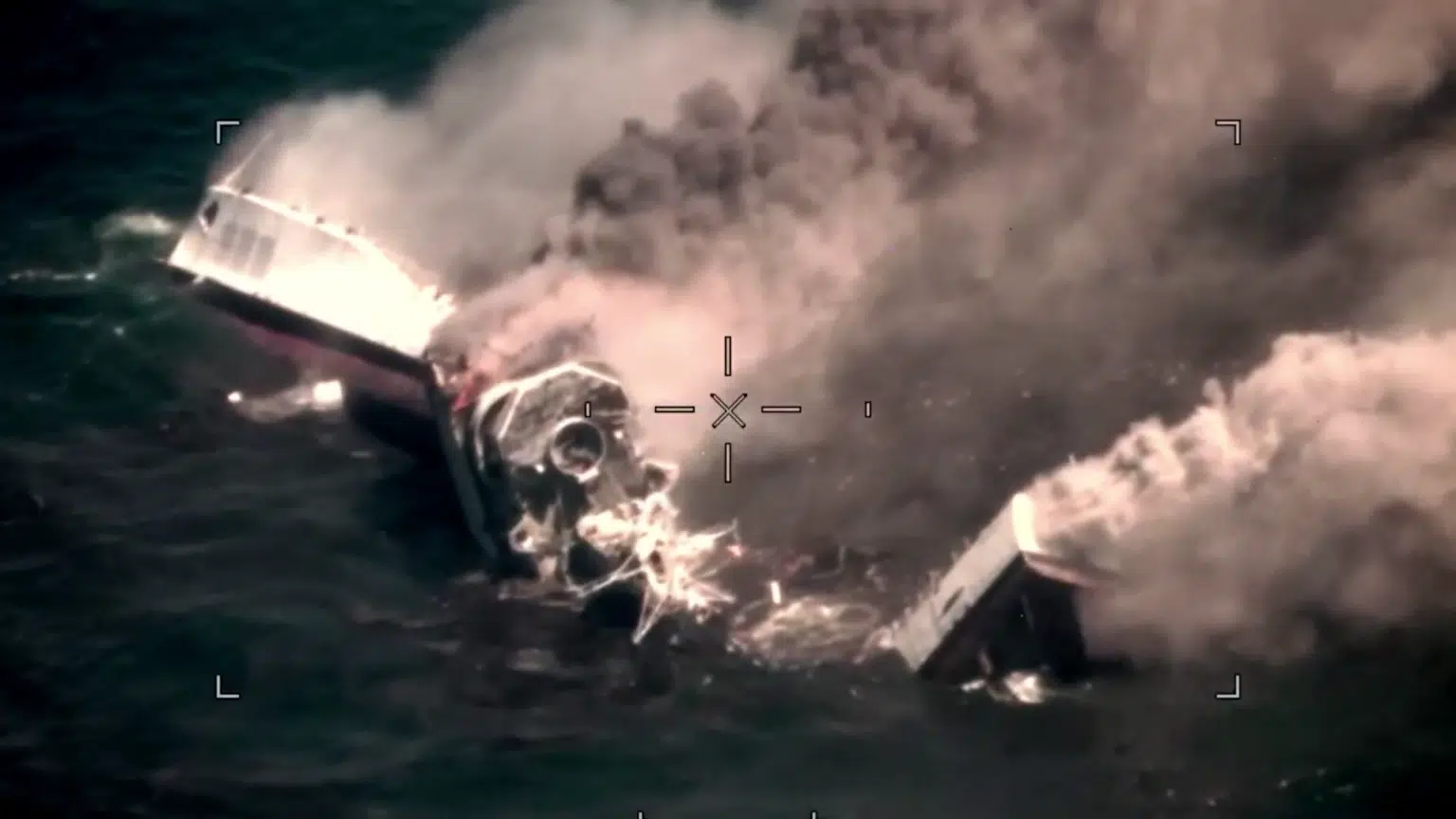
The hull breaks apart and sinks.

== Bibliography ==
- Blackman, Raymond V. B., ed. (1971). Jane's Fighting Ships 1971–72. London: Sampson Low Marston & Co., Ltd. ISBN 0-354-00096-9.
- Couhat, Jean Labayle; Baker, A. D., eds. (1986). Combat Fleets of the World 1986/87. Annapolis, Maryland, USA: Naval Institute Press. ISBN 0-85368-860-5.
- Gardiner, Robert; Chumbley, Stephen, eds. (1995). Conway's All The World's Fighting Ships 1947–1995. Annapolis, Maryland, USA: Naval Institute Press. ISBN 1-55750-132-7.
- Moore, John, ed. (1979). Jane's Fighting Ships 1979–1980. London: Jane's Yearbooks. ISBN 0-354-00587-1.
- Moore, John, ed. (1984). Jane's Fighting Ships 1984-85. London: Jane's Yearbooks. ISBN 978-0710607959.
- Prézelin, Bernard; Baker, A. D. III, eds. (1990). The Naval Institute Guide to Combat Fleets of the World 1990/1991. Annapolis, Maryland, USA: Naval Institute Press. ISBN 0-87021-250-8.
- Saunders, Stephan, ed. (2009). Jane's Fighting Ships 2009-2010. Jane's Information Group. ISBN 978-0-7106-2888-6.
