= HNLMS Tjerk Hiddes (F804) =

1965 Van Speijk-class frigate

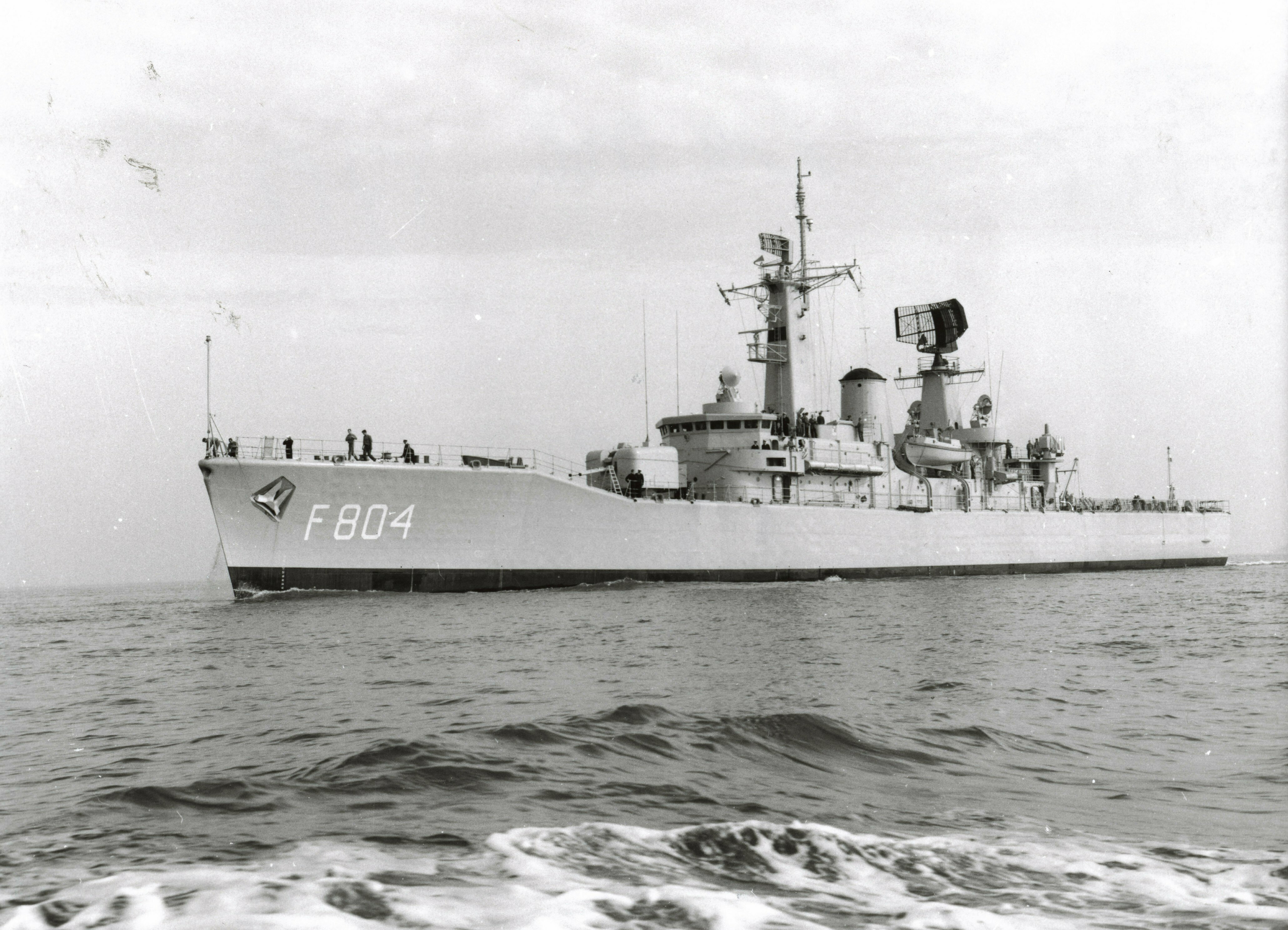
- The HNLMS Tjerk Hiddes in its original configuration with the Royal Netherlands Navy

History

Netherlands
- Name: Tjerk Hiddes
- Namesake: Tjerk Hiddes de Vries
- Builder: NDSM, Amsterdam
- Laid down: 1 June 1964
- Launched: 17 December 1965
- Commissioned: 16 August 1967
- Decommissioned: 1986
- Identification: Pennant number: F804; Code letters: PAVC
- Fate: Sold to the Indonesian Navy 11 February 1986

Indonesia
- Name: Ahmad Yani
- Namesake: Ahmad Yani
- Acquired: 11 February 1986
- Commissioned: 31 October 1986
- Identification: IMO number: 5316856; MMSI number: 525114004; Callsign: PLDL; Pennant number: 351
- Status: Active service

General characteristics
- Class & type: Van Speijk class; Ahmad Yani class
- Displacement: 2,200 tons standard, 2,850 tons full load
- Length: 113.4 m (372 ft)
- Beam: 12.5 m (41 ft)
- Draught: 5.8 m (19 ft)
- Propulsion: As built; 2 x Babcock & Wilcox boilers; 2 x Werkspoor/English Electric steam turbines; 22,370 kW (30,000 shp); 2 x shafts; Rebuild; 2 x Caterpillar 3616 diesels; 10,900 kW (14,600 shp); 2 x shafts
- Speed: 28.5 kn (52.8 km/h; 32.8 mph); With new diesels - estimated max. 24 kn (44 km/h; 28 mph)
- Range: 4,500 nmi (8,300 km; 5,200 mi) at 12 kn (22 km/h; 14 mph)
- Complement: 180
- Sensors & processing systems: Radar: LW-03, DA-02, M45, M44; Sonar: Types 170B, 162; Combat system: SEWACO V
- Armament: as Ahmad Yani; 1 × OTO Melara 76 mm gun; 4 × 12.7 mm DShK MGs; 2 × twin Simbad launcher for Mistral SAMs; 4 × C-802 SSM; 2 × 3 – Mk 32 anti submarine torpedo tubes
- Aircraft carried: one NBO-105C
- Aviation facilities: Hangar

HNLMS Tjerk Hiddes (F804) (Dutch: Hr.Ms. Tjerk Hiddes) was a frigate of the Van Speijk class. The ship was in service with the Royal Netherlands Navy from 1967 to 1986. The ship's radio call sign was "PAVC". She was sold to the Indonesian Navy where the ship was renamed KRI Ahmad Yani (351).

== Design and construction ==
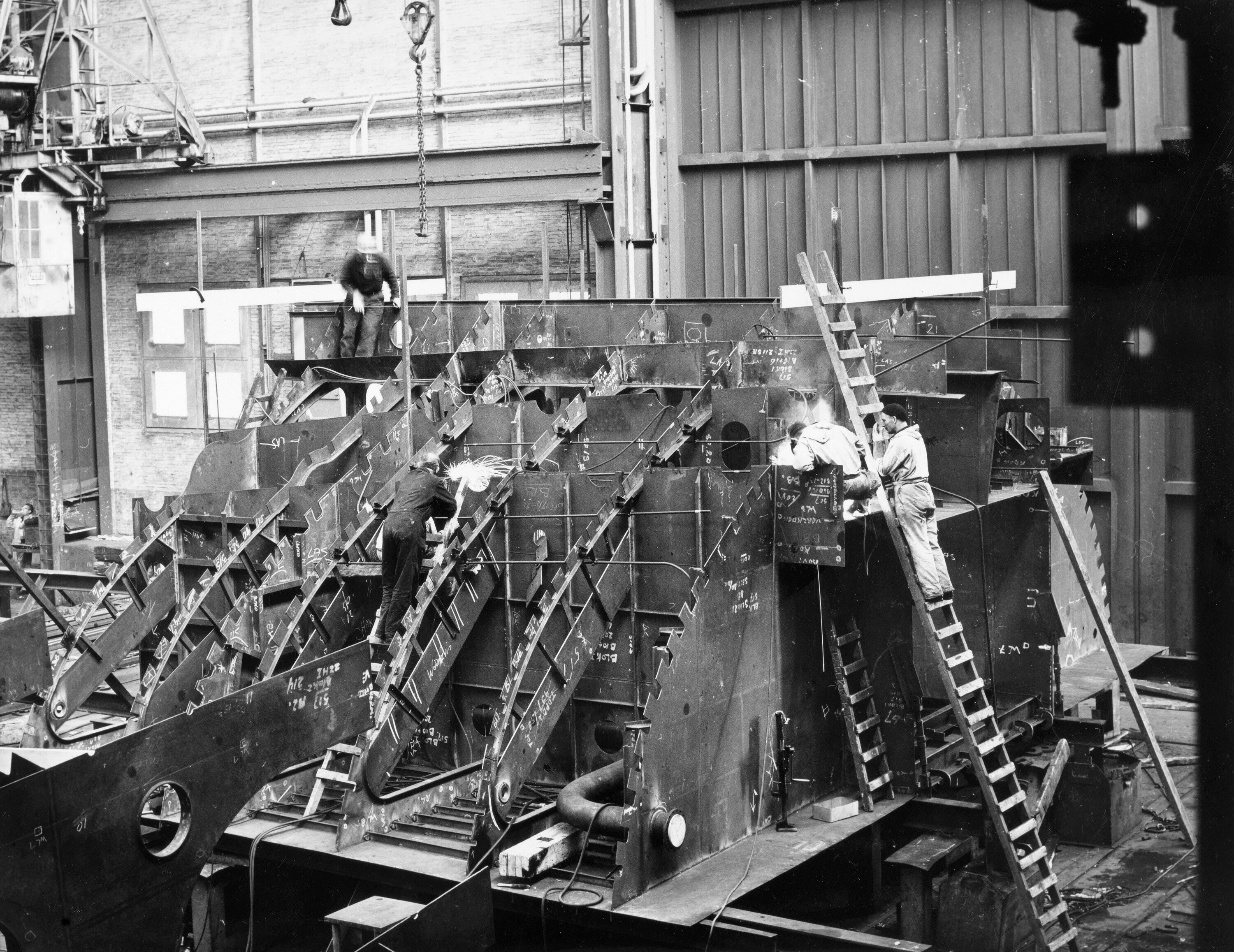
Construction is underway at Nederlandsche Dok en Scheepsbouw Maatschappij in Amsterdam in 1963.

In the early 1960s, the Royal Netherlands Navy had an urgent requirement to replace its Van Amstel-class frigates, obsolete ex-American escorts built during the Second World War. To meet this requirement, it chose to build a modified version of the British Leander-class frigate as its Van Speijk class, using broadly the same armament as the original design, but where possible substituting Dutch electronics and radars.

The Van Speijks were 113.4 m (372 ft) long overall and 109.7 m (360 ft) between perpendiculars, with a beam of 12.5 m (41 ft) and a draught of 5.8 m (19 ft). Displacement was 2,200 long tons (2,200 t) standard and 2,850 long tons (2,900 t) full load. Two Babcock & Wilcox boilers supplied steam to two sets of Werkspoor-English Electric double reduction geared steam turbines rated at 30,000 shp (22,000 kW) and driving two propeller shafts. This gave a speed of 28.5 kn (32.8 mph; 52.8 km/h).

A twin 4.5-inch (113 mm) Mark 6 gun mount was fitted forward. Anti-aircraft defence was provided by two quadruple Sea Cat surface-to-air missile launchers on the hangar roof. A Limbo anti-submarine mortar was fitted aft to provide short-range anti-submarine capability, while a hangar and helicopter deck allowed a single Westland Wasp helicopter to be operated for longer-range anti-submarine and anti-surface operations.

As built, Tjerk Hiddes was fitted with a Signaal LW-03 long range air search radar on the ship's mainmast, with a DA02 medium range air/surface surveillance radar carried on the ship's foremast. M44 and M45 fire control radars were provided for the Seacat missiles and ship's guns respectively. The ship had a sonar suite of Type 170B attack sonar and Type 162 bottom search sonar. The ship had a crew of 251.

=== Modifications ===
All six Van Speijks were modernised in the 1970s, using many of the systems used by the new Kortenaer-class frigates. The 4.5-inch gun was replaced by a single OTO Melara 76 mm gun, and launchers for up to eight Harpoon anti-ship missiles fitted (although only two were normally carried). The hangar and flight deck were enlarged, allowing a Westland Lynx helicopter to be carried, while the Limbo mortar was removed, with a pair of triple Mk 32 torpedo launchers providing close-in anti-submarine armament. A Signaal DA03 radar replaced the DA02 radar, and an American EDO Corporation CWE-610 sonar replaced the original British sonar. Tjerk Hiddes was modernised at the Den Helder naval dockyard between 15 December 1978 and 1 June 1981.

== Dutch service history ==
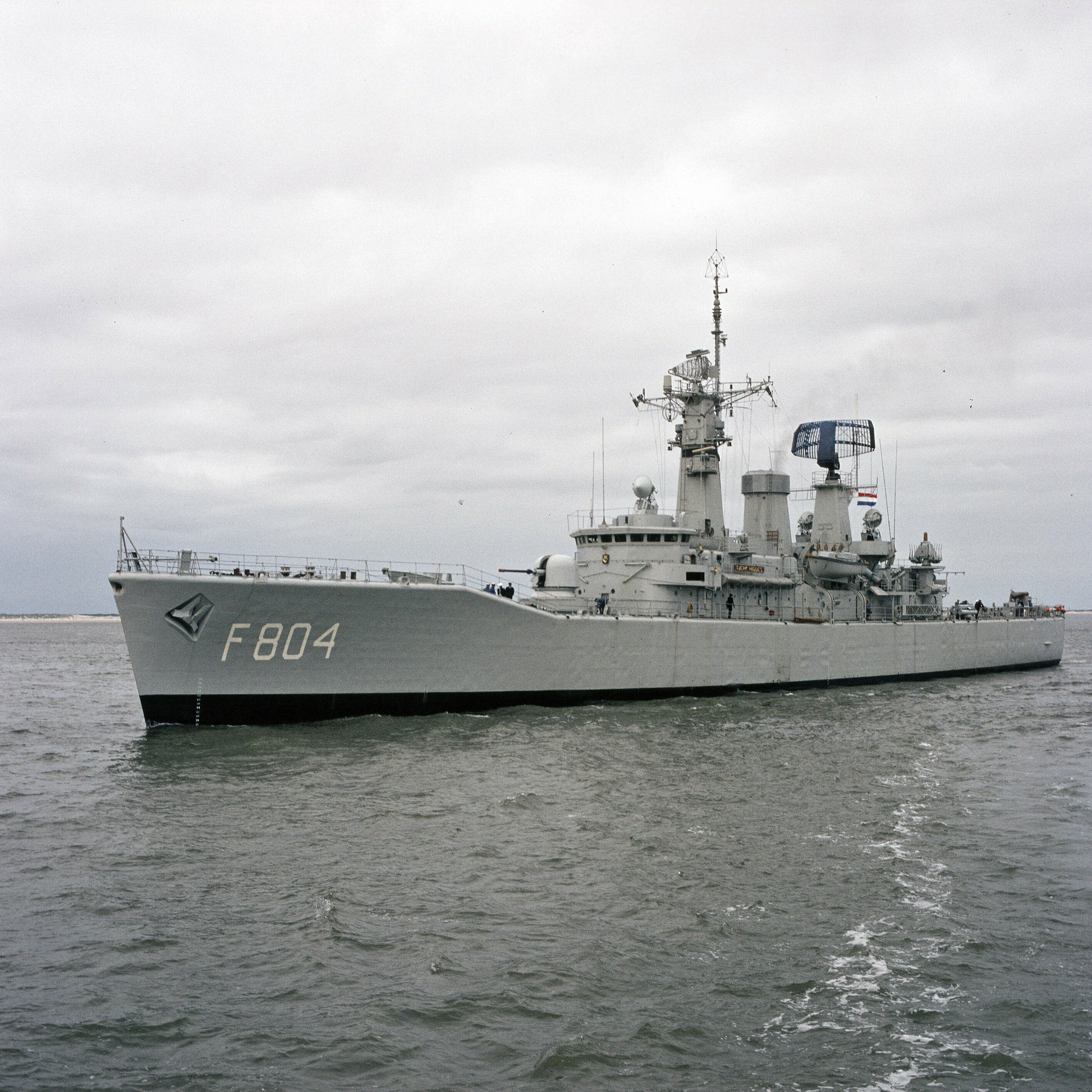
The modernized HNLMS Tjerk Hiddes in the 1980s.

An order for four Van Speijks, including Tjerk Hiddes, was placed in 1962, with two more ordered in 1964. Tjerk Hiddes was laid down at the Amsterdam shipyard of Nederlandsche Dok en Scheepsbouw Maatschappij on 1 June 1964 and was launched on 17 December 1965. The ship was completed and entered service on 16 August 1967 with the pennant number F804.

In 1969 Tjerk Hiddes participated in the NATO exercises Razor Sharp and Peace Keeper and also served with STANAVFORLANT.

On 27 August 1978 she was present at the Navy days at Portsmouth.

Tjerk Hiddes suffered from boiler problems, and in 1986 was put up for sale along with sister ships Van Speijk, Van Galen and Van Nes. The four ships then were purchased by Indonesia. Tjerk Hiddes was decommissioned on 6 January 1986 and transferred to the Indonesian Navy on 31 October 1986.

== Indonesian service history ==
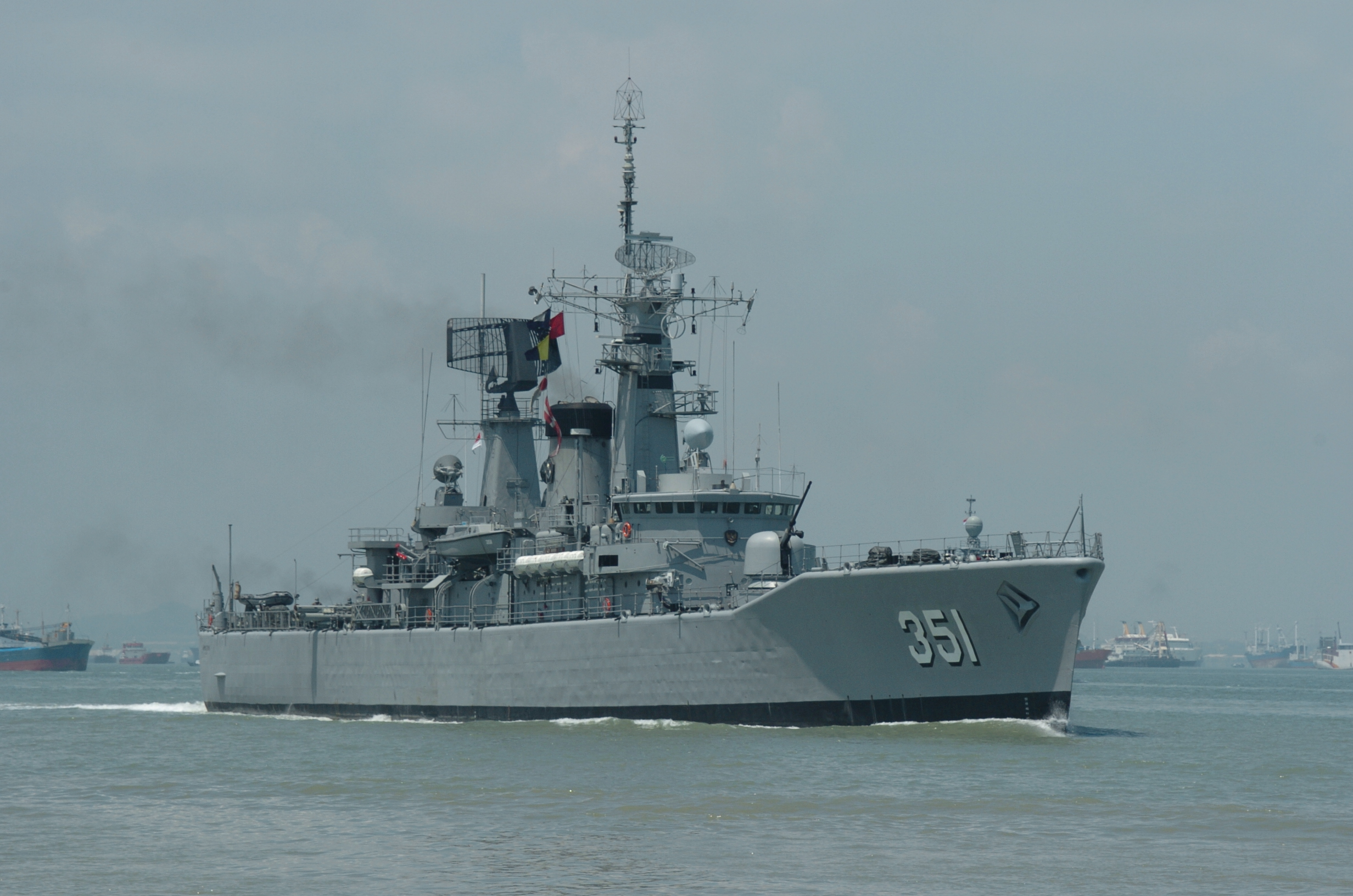
KRI Ahmad Yani in 2007

On 11 February 1986, Indonesia and the Netherlands signed an agreement for transfer of two Van Speijk class with option on two more ships. The ship was transferred to Indonesia on 31 October 1986 and renamed KRI Ahmad Yani on joining the Indonesian Navy, with the pennant number 351.

By 2002, the ships Seacat missiles were inoperable and it was reported that propulsion problems were badly affecting the availability of the ships of this class. The ship's Seacat launchers were therefore replaced by two Simbad twin launchers for Mistral anti-aircraft missiles, and Ahmad Yani was re-engined with two 10.9 megawatts (14,600 shp) Caterpillar 3616 diesel engines. As the Indonesian Navy retired Harpoon missile from its stockpiles, Ahmad Yani was rearmed with Chinese C-802 missiles.
