= Ahmad Yani-class frigate =

Class of Indonesian frigates

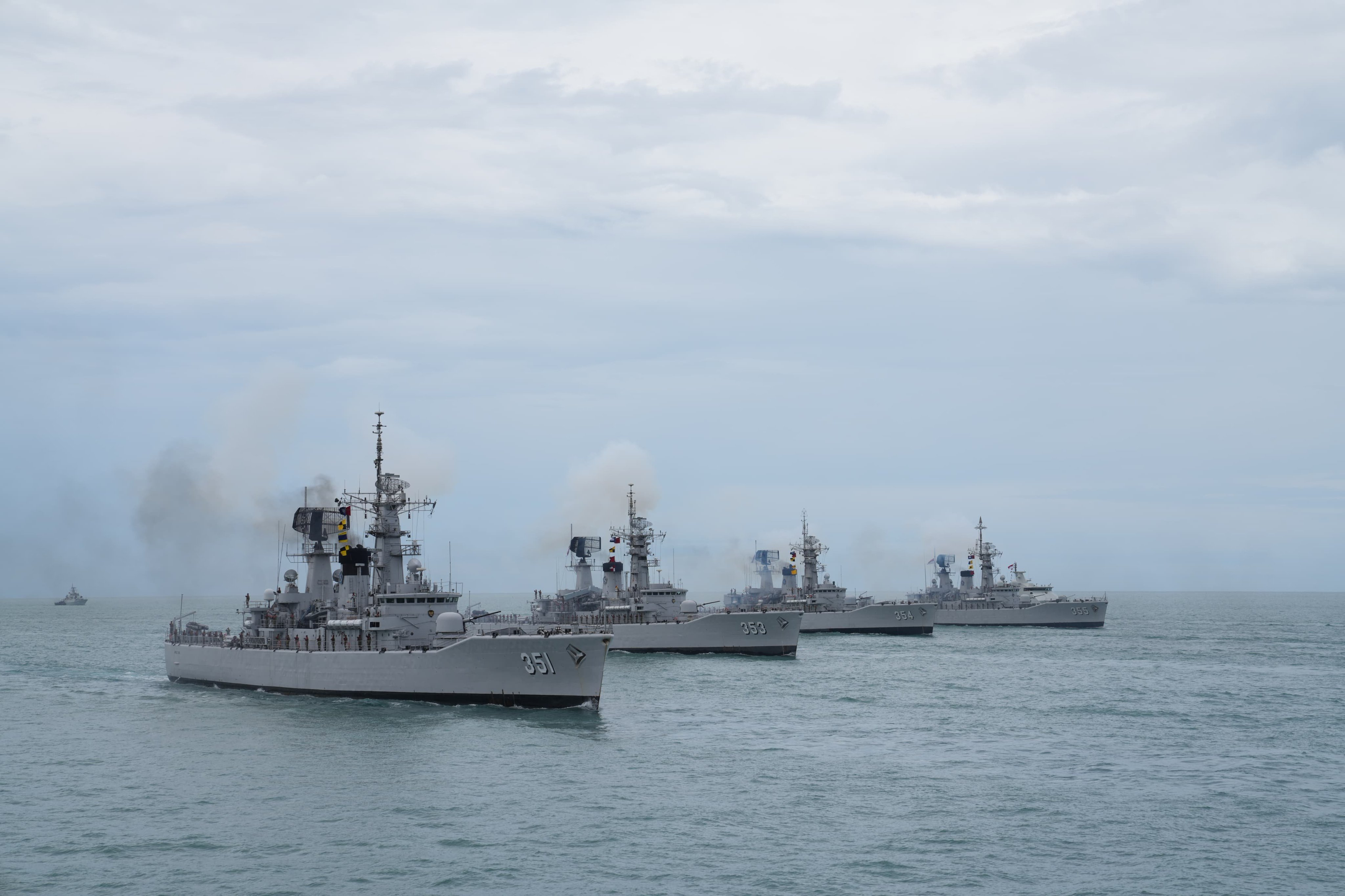
- Four Ahmad Yani-class frigates sailing together at the 2025 Navy Sailing Pass

Class overview
- Name: Ahmad Yani class
- Builders: Nederlandsche Dok en Scheepsbouw Maatschappij; Damen Schelde Naval Shipbuilding
- Operators: Indonesian Navy
- Preceded by: Martha Khristina Tiyahahu class
- Succeeded by: Martadinata class
- Subclasses: Van Speijk class
- Built: 1963–1968
- In service: 1986–present (Indonesian Navy)
- Completed: 6
- Active: 5
- Retired: 1

General characteristics
- Type: Frigate
- Displacement: 2,200 tons standard, 2,850 tons full load
- Length: 113.4 m (372 ft 1 in)
- Beam: 12.5 m (41 ft 0 in)
- Draught: 5.8 m (19 ft 0 in)
- Propulsion: As built; 2 x geared steam turbines; 22,370 kW (30,000 shp); 2 x shafts; Rebuild; Caterpillar diesels (5 ships); SEMT-Pielstick diesels (1 ship)
- Speed: 28.5 knots (52.8 km/h; 32.8 mph); With new diesels - estimated max. 24 kn (44 km/h; 28 mph)
- Range: 4,500 nmi (8,300 km; 5,200 mi) at 12 kn (22 km/h; 14 mph)
- Complement: 180
- Sensors & processing systems: Radar: LW-03, DA-02, M45, M44; Sonar: Types 170B, 162; Combat system: SEWACO V
- Armament: 1× OTO Melara 76 mm gun; 2× twin Simbad; Launcher for Mistral SAMs; (Originally equipped with Seacat); 4× SS-N-26 SSM (KRI Oswald Siahaan); 4× C-802 SSM (on five ships); (Originally equipped with Harpoon Block 1D); 2 × 3 – Mk 32 anti-submarine torpedo tubes
- Aircraft carried: 1x NBO-105C
- Aviation facilities: Hangar

The Ahmad Yani class of six general-purpose frigates were acquired by the Indonesian Navy in the 1980s. They were originally built in the Netherlands for the Royal Netherlands Navy as the Van Speijk class which were licence-built versions of the British Leander class, Unlike its predecessors, this ship has been extensively modernized and modified by the Indonesian Navy since the 2000s, so its performance is not the same as the original.

== Operational history ==
In 1992, KRI Ki Hajar Dewantara, along with KRI Yos Sudarso and KRI Teluk Banten intercepted the Portuguese ship Lusitania Expresso in East Timor. Col. Widodo, deputy assistant of the Indonesian Navy´s Eastern Fleet, told Radio Republik Indonesia from aboard the Indonesian warship KRI Yos Sudarso that the ferry entered Indonesian waters at 5:28 a.m. local time on March 11, 1992. At 6:07, the Lusitania Expresso had travelled two to three nautical miles (3.7 to 5.6 km; 2.3 to 3.5 mi) into Indonesian territory and Captain Luis Dos Santos (Lusitania Expresso's captain) was ordered to leave immediately. Col. Widodo said the Portuguese ship captain obeyed the order and turned his ship around and headed back to sea.

== Ships ==
Name	Pennant number	Namesake	Previously	Acquired	Commissioned	Status
KRI Ahmad Yani	351	Ahmad Yani, an army general killed in the 30 September Movement	Tjerk Hiddes	1986	1986	Active
KRI Slamet Riyadi	352	Slamet Riyadi, an army lieutenant colonel killed in Fort Victoria, Maluku	Van Speijk	1986	1986	Sunk as target
KRI Yos Sudarso	353	Yos Sudarso a navy commodore killed in the Battle of Arafura Sea	Van Galen	1987	1987	Active
KRI Oswald Siahaan	354	Oswald Siahaan, a lieutenant killed in at Sibolga Bay in 1948	Van Nes	1986	1988	Active
KRI Abdul Halim Perdanakusuma	355	Halim Perdanakusuma an air vice-marshal killed in 1947	Evertsen	1989	1989	Active
KRI Karel Satsuitubun	356	Karel Satsuit Tubun, a police officer killed in the 30 September Movement	Isaac Sweers	1990	1990	Active

== Modernisation ==
All six frigates have had their steam turbine power plants replaced with marine diesel engines.

The frigates of the Ahmad Yani class are due to be replaced by the Martadinata-class frigates (SIGMA PKR 10514); the first of which, Raden Eddy Martadinata (331), was commissioned on 7 April 2017.

== See also ==
- List of active Indonesian Navy ships
- Equipment of the Indonesian Navy
