= HNLMS Evertsen (F815) =

1966 Van Speijk-class frigate

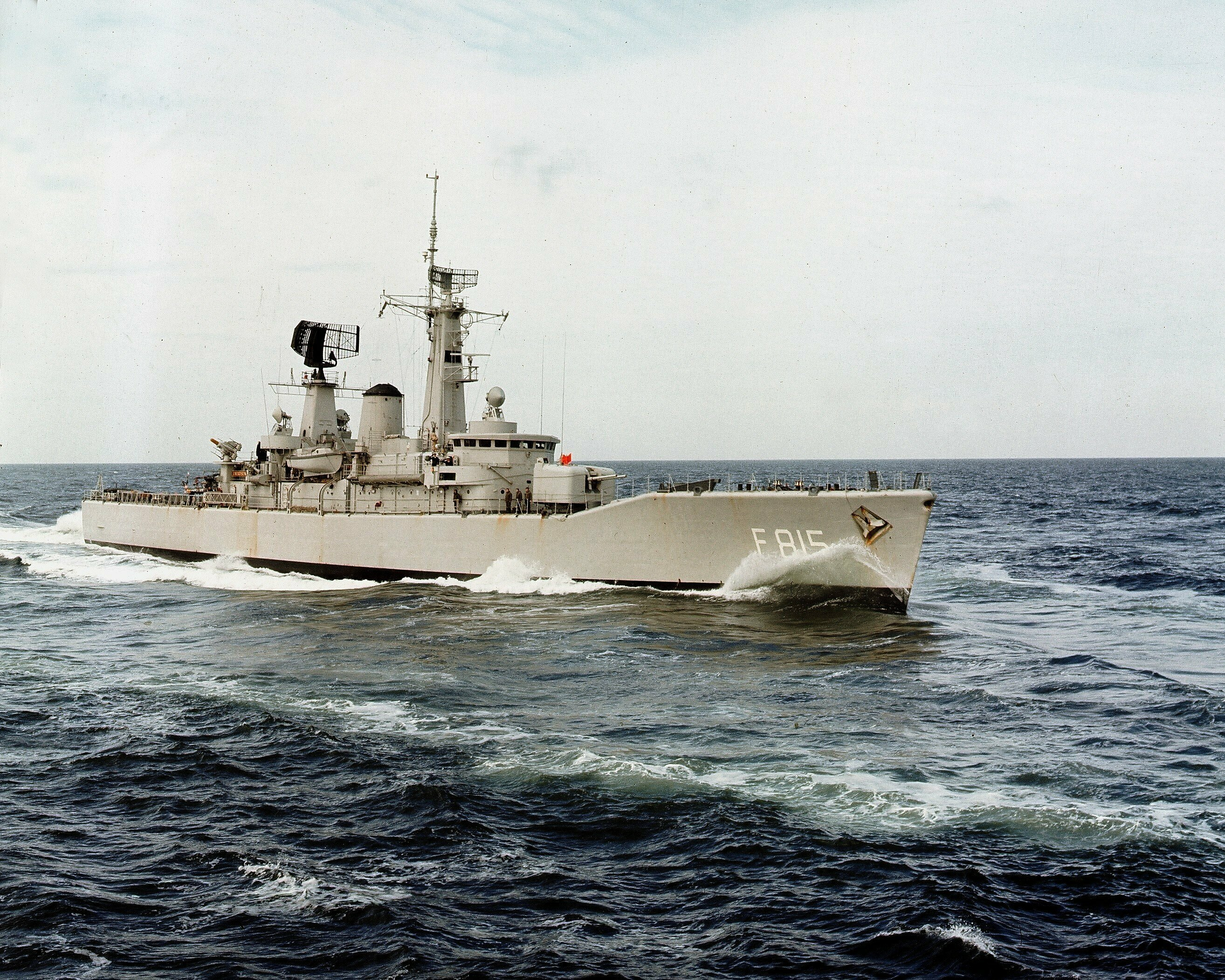
- HNLMS Evertsen in its original configuration

History

Netherlands
- Name: Evertsen
- Namesake: Johan Evertsen
- Builder: KM de Schelde, Vlissingen
- Laid down: 6 July 1965
- Launched: 8 June 1966
- Commissioned: 21 December 1967
- Decommissioned: 1989
- Identification: Pennant number: F815; Code letters: PAVG
- Fate: Sold to the Indonesian Navy

Indonesia
- Name: Abdul Halim Perdanakusuma
- Namesake: Halim Perdanakusuma
- Acquired: 13 May 1989
- Commissioned: 1 November 1989
- Identification: MMSI number: 525114005; Callsign: PKIB; Pennant number: 355
- Status: In active service

General characteristics
- Class & type: Van Speijk class; Ahmad Yani class
- Displacement: 2,200 tons standard, 2,850 tons full load
- Length: 113.4 m (372 ft)
- Beam: 12.5 m (41 ft)
- Draught: 5.8 m (19 ft)
- Propulsion: As built; 2 x Babcock & Wilcox boilers; 2 x Werkspoor/English Electric steam turbines; 22,370 kW (30,000 shp); 2 x shafts; Rebuild; 2 x Caterpillar 3616 diesels; 10,900 kW (14,600 shp); 2 x shafts
- Speed: 28.5 kn (52.8 km/h; 32.8 mph); With new diesels - estimated max. 24 kn (44 km/h; 28 mph)
- Range: 4,500 nmi (8,300 km; 5,200 mi) at 12 kn (22 km/h; 14 mph)
- Complement: 180
- Sensors & processing systems: Radar: LW-03, DA-02, M45, M44; Sonar: Types 170B, 162; Combat system: SEWACO V
- Armament: as Abdul Halim Perdanakusuma; 1 × OTO Melara 76 mm gun; 4 × 12.7 mm DShK HMGs; 2 × twin Simbad launcher for Mistral SAMs; 4 × C-802 SSM; 2 × 3 – Mk 32 anti submarine torpedo tubes
- Aircraft carried: one NBO-105C
- Aviation facilities: Hangar

HNLMS Evertsen (F815) (Dutch: Hr.Ms. Evertsen) was a frigate of the Van Speijk class. The ship was in service with the Royal Netherlands Navy from 1967 to 1989. The ship's radio call sign was "PAVG". She was sold to the Indonesian Navy where the ship was renamed KRI Abdul Halim Perdanakusuma (355).

== Design and construction ==
In the early 1960s, the Royal Netherlands Navy had an urgent requirement to replace its Van Amstel-class frigates, obsolete ex-American escorts built during the Second World War. To meet this requirement, it chose to build a modified version of the British Leander-class frigate as its Van Speijk class, using broadly the same armament as the original design, but where possible, substituting Dutch electronics and radars.

The Van Speijks were 113.4 m (372 ft) long overall and 109.7 m (360 ft) between perpendiculars, with a beam of 12.5 m (41 ft) and a draught of 5.8 m (19 ft). Displacement was 2,200 long tons (2,200 t) standard and 2,850 long tons (2,900 t) full load. Two Babcock & Wilcox boilers supplied steam to two sets of Werkspoor-English Electric double reduction geared steam turbines rated at 30,000 shp (22,000 kW) and driving two propeller shafts. This gave a speed of 28.5 kn (32.8 mph; 52.8 km/h).

A twin 4.5-inch (113 mm) Mark 6 gun mount was fitted forward. Anti-aircraft defence was provided by two quadruple Sea Cat surface-to-air missile launchers on the hangar roof. A Limbo anti-submarine mortar was fitted aft to provide a short-range anti-submarine capability, while a hangar and helicopter deck allowed a single Westland Wasp helicopter to be operated, for longer range anti-submarine and anti-surface operations.

As built, Evertsen was fitted with a Signaal LW-03 long range air search radar on the ship's mainmast, with a DA02 medium range air/surface surveillance radar carried on the ship's foremast. M44 and M45 fire control radars were provided for the Seacat missiles and the ship's guns respectively. The ship had a sonar suite of Type 170B attack sonar and Type 162 bottom search sonar. The ship had a crew of 251.

=== Modifications ===
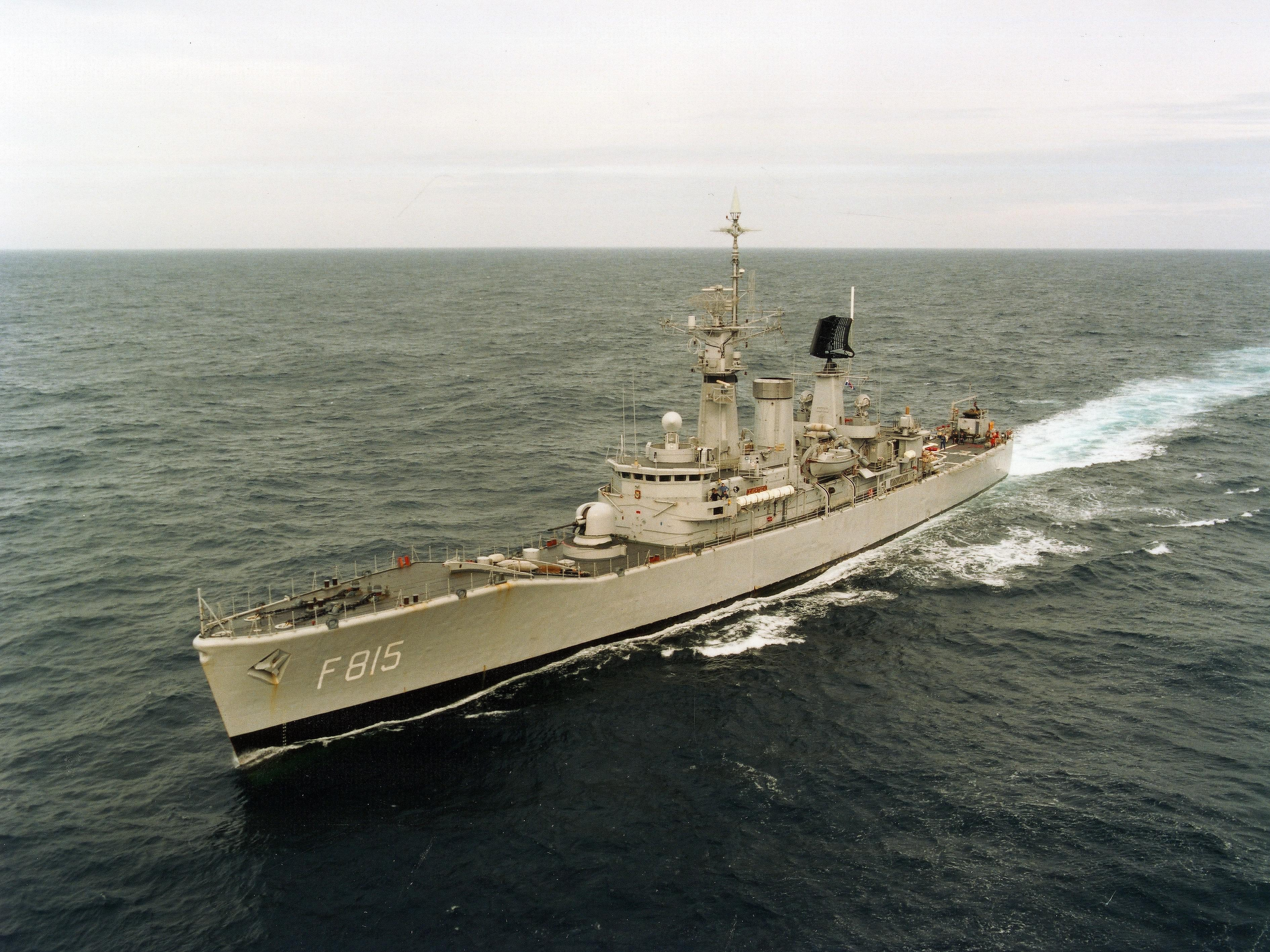
The modernised Evertsen in the 1980s.

All six Van Speijks were modernised in the 1970s, using many of the systems used by the new Kortenaer-class frigates. The 4.5-inch gun was replaced by a single OTO Melara 76 mm and launchers for up to eight Harpoon anti-ship missiles fitted (although only two were normally carried). The hangar and flight deck were enlarged, allowing a Westland Lynx helicopter to be carried, while the Limbo mortar was removed, with a pair of triple Mk 32 torpedo launchers providing close-in anti-submarine armament. A Signaal DA03 radar replaced the DA02 radar and an American EDO Corporation CWE-610 sonar replaced the original British sonar. Evertsen was modernised at the Den Helder naval dockyard between 13 or 18 July 1979 and 26 November 1982. Evertsen and Isaac Sweers also received AN/SQR-18A towed array sonar system. The system was removed when the ships were sold to Indonesia.

== Dutch service history ==
An order for four Van Speijks was placed in 1962, with two more, including Evertsen, ordered in 1964. The ship was built at KM de Schelde in Vlissingen. The keel laying took place on 6 July 1965 and the launching on 8 June 1966. The ship was put into service on 21 December 1967 with the pennant number F815.

In 1969 she attended a naval review at Spithead together with the destroyers Zeeland, Holland and Noord-Brabant, the cruiser De Ruyter and the frigate Van Nes.

The ship received a mid-life modernization in Den Helder, starting on 13 or 18 July 1979 and lasting till 26 November 1982. The completion of modernization was delayed by around eight months from intended due to lack of civilian labor in naval dockyards.

Evertsen was decommissioned in 1989 and along with Isaac Sweers were sold to Indonesia. She was transferred to the Indonesian Navy on 1 November 1989.

== Indonesian service history ==
On 13 May 1989, Indonesia and the Netherlands signed an agreement for transfer of the last two Van Speijk-class ships. The ship was transferred to Indonesia on 1 November 1989 and renamed as KRI Abdul Halim Perdanakusuma, assigned with pennant number 355.

By 2002, the ship's Seacat missiles were inoperable and it was reported that propulsion problems were badly effecting the availability of the ships of this class. The ship's Seacat launchers were therefore replaced by two Simbad twin launchers for Mistral anti-aircraft missiles, and Abdul Halim Perdanakusuma was re-engined with 10.9 megawatts (14,600 shp) Caterpillar 3616 diesel engines. When the Indonesian Navy retired Harpoon missile from its stockpiles, Abdul Halim Perdanakusuma was rearmed with Chinese C-802 missiles.

In 2011, Abdul Halim Perdanakusuma along with Yos Sudarso and Banjarmasin were dispatched to Somalian waters as a task force responding to the hijacking of the Indonesian cargo ship MV Sinar Kudus by Somali pirates.

Abdul Halim Perdanakusuma, along with Karel Satsuitubun, Raden Eddy Martadinata, I Gusti Ngurah Rai, Fatahillah, Malahayati, Sultan Hasanuddin, Sultan Iskandar Muda, Sultan Nuku, dr. Wahidin Sudirohusodo, Surabaya, Teluk Banten, Tarakan and Bima Suci were deployed in waters off Nusa Dua, Bali to patrol the area during 2022 G20 Bali summit on 15–16 November 2022.

== Bibliography ==
- Blackman, Raymond V. B., ed. (1971). Jane's Fighting Ships 1971–72. London: Sampson Low Marston & Co., Ltd. ISBN 0-354-00096-9.
- Couhat, Jean Labayle; Baker, A. D., eds. (1986). Combat Fleets of the World 1986/87. Annapolis, Maryland, USA: Naval Institute Press. ISBN 0-85368-860-5.
- Gardiner, Robert; Chumbley, Stephen, eds. (1995). Conway's All The World's Fighting Ships 1947–1995. Annapolis, Maryland, USA: Naval Institute Press. ISBN 1-55750-132-7.
- Moore, John, ed. (1979). Jane's Fighting Ships 1979–1980. London: Jane's Yearbooks. ISBN 0-354-00587-1.
- Moore, John, ed. (1984). Jane's Fighting Ships 1984-85. London: Jane's Yearbooks. ISBN 978-0710607959.
- Prézelin, Bernard; Baker, A. D. III, eds. (1990). The Naval Institute Guide to Combat Fleets of the World 1990/1991. Annapolis, Maryland, USA: Naval Institute Press. ISBN 0-87021-250-8.
- Saunders, Stephen, ed. (2002). Jane's Fighting Ships 2002–2003. Coulsdon, Surrey, UK: Jane's Information Group. ISBN 0-7106-24328.
- Saunders, Stephan, ed. (2009). Jane's Fighting Ships 2009-2010. Jane's Information Group. ISBN 978-0-7106-2888-6.
- Jordan, John (2016). Warship 2016. London: Conway. ISBN 978-1844863266.
