= HNLMS Van Galen (F803) =

1965 Van Speijk-class frigate

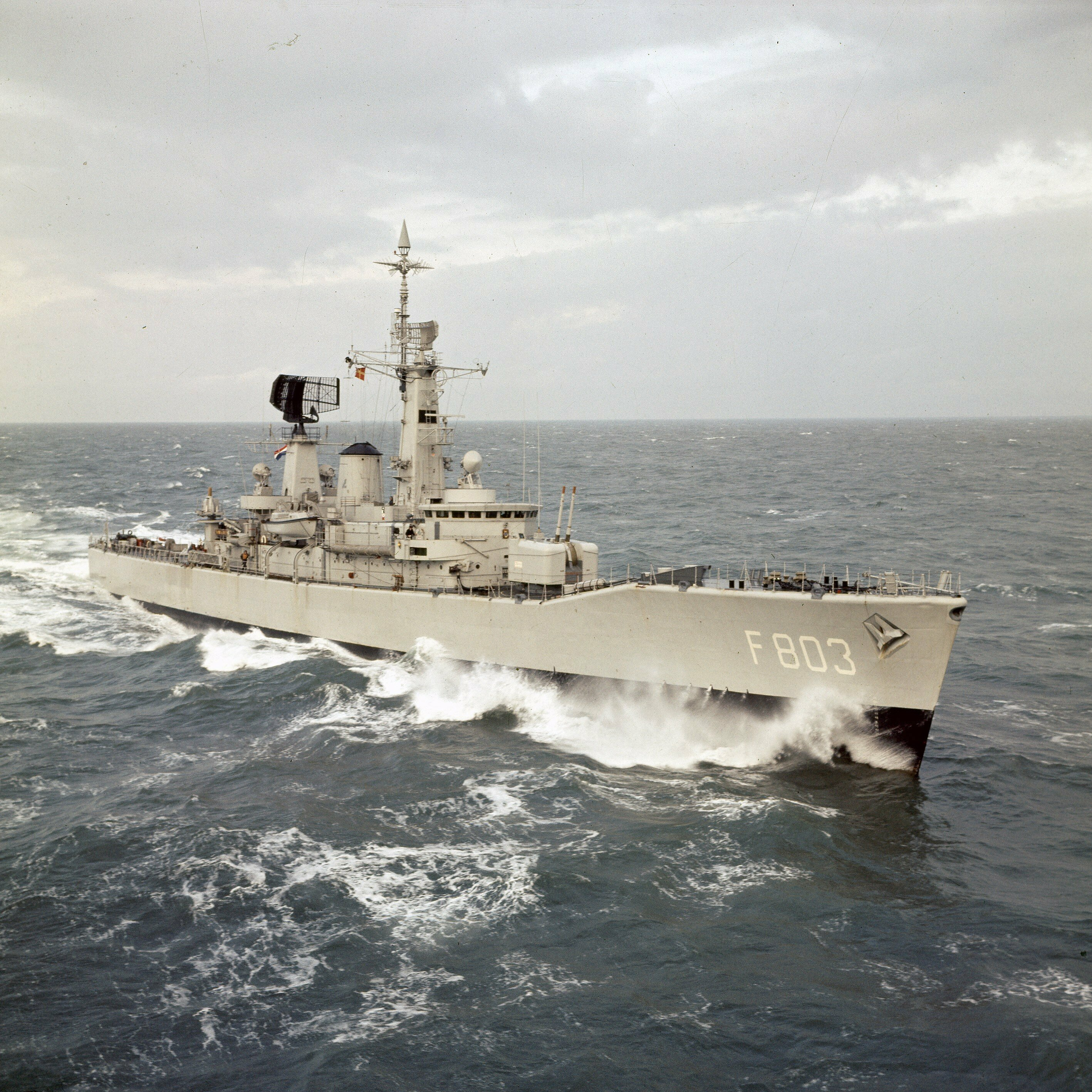
- HNLMS Van Galen before her upgrade

History

Netherlands
- Name: Van Galen
- Namesake: Johan van Galen
- Builder: KM de Schelde, Vlissingen
- Laid down: 25 July 1963
- Launched: 19 June 1965
- Commissioned: 1 March 1967
- Decommissioned: 1987
- Identification: Pennant number: F803; Code letters: PAVB
- Fate: Sold to the Indonesian Navy 11 February 1986

Indonesia
- Name: Yos Sudarso
- Namesake: Yos Sudarso
- Acquired: 11 February 1986
- Commissioned: 2 November 1987
- Identification: Pennant number: 353
- Status: Active service

General characteristics
- Class & type: Van Speijk class; Ahmad Yani class
- Displacement: 2,200 tons standard, 2,850 tons full load
- Length: 113.4 m (372 ft)
- Beam: 12.5 m (41 ft)
- Draught: 5.8 m (19 ft)
- Propulsion: As built; 2 x Babcock & Wilcox boilers; 2 x Werkspoor/English Electric steam turbines; 22,370 kW (30,000 shp); 2 x shafts; Rebuild; 2 x Caterpillar 3616 diesels; 10,900 kW (14,600 shp); 2 x shafts
- Speed: 28.5 kn (52.8 km/h; 32.8 mph); With new diesels - estimated max. 24 kn (44 km/h; 28 mph)
- Range: 4,500 nmi (8,300 km; 5,200 mi) at 12 kn (22 km/h; 14 mph)
- Complement: 180
- Sensors & processing systems: Radar: LW-03, DA-02, M45, M44; Sonar: Types 170B, 162; Combat system: SEWACO V
- Armament: as Yos Sudarso; 1 × OTO Melara 76 mm gun; 4 × 12.7 mm DShK machine guns; 2 × twin Simbad launcher for Mistral SAMs; 4 × C-802 SSM; 2 × 3 – Mk 32 anti submarine torpedo tubes
- Aircraft carried: one NBO-105C
- Aviation facilities: Hangar

HNLMS Van Galen (F803) (Dutch: Hr.Ms. Van Galen) was a frigate of the Van Speijk class. The ship was in service with the Royal Netherlands Navy from 1967 to 1987. The ship's radio call sign was "PAVB". She was sold to the Indonesian Navy where the ship was renamed KRI Yos Sudarso (353).

== Design and construction ==
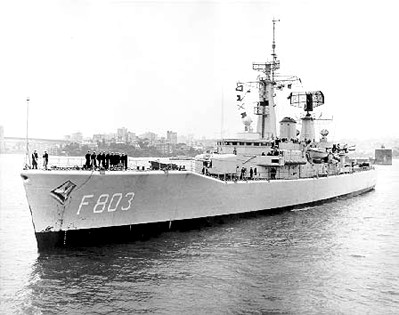
HNLMS Van Galen in 1973

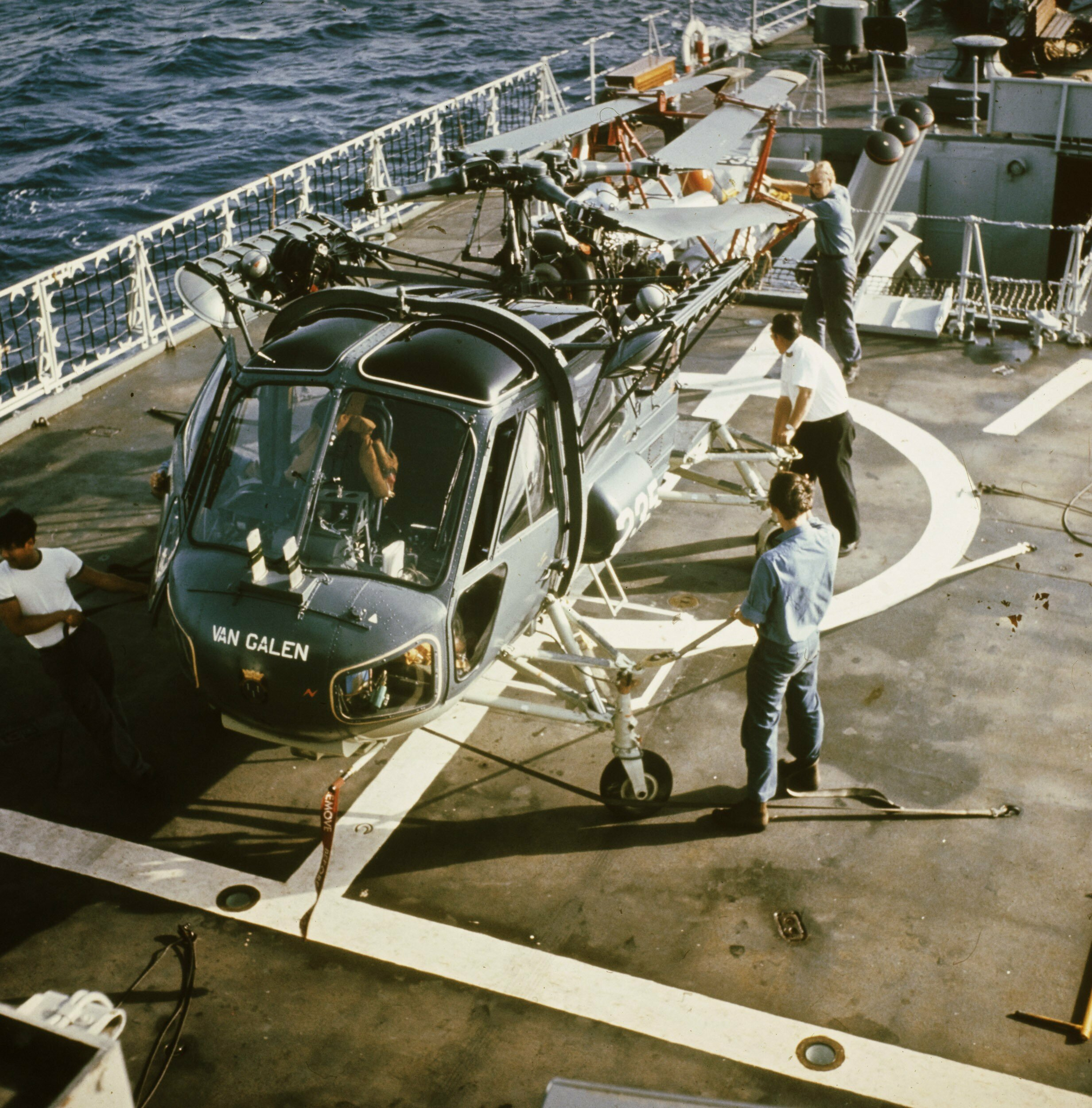
A Westland Wasp with folded rotor blades on the flight deck of Van Galen.

In the early 1960s, the Royal Netherlands Navy had an urgent requirement to replace its Van Amstel-class frigates, obsolete ex-American escorts built during the Second World War. To meet this requirement, it chose to build a modified version of the British Leander-class frigate as its Van Speijk class, using broadly the same armament as the original design, but where possible, substituting Dutch electronics and radars.

The Van Speijks were 113.4 m (372 ft) long overall and 109.7 m (360 ft) between perpendiculars, with a beam of 12.5 m (41 ft) and a draught of 5.8 m (19 ft). Displacement was 2,200 long tons (2,200 t) standard and 2,850 long tons (2,900 t) full load. Two Babcock & Wilcox boilers supplied steam to two sets of Werkspoor-English Electric double reduction geared steam turbines rated at 30,000 shp (22,000 kW) and driving two propeller shafts. This gave a speed of 28.5 kn (32.8 mph; 52.8 km/h).

A twin 4.5-inch (113 mm) Mark 6 gun mount was fitted forward. Anti-aircraft defence was provided by two quadruple Sea Cat surface-to-air missile launchers on the hangar roof. A Limbo anti-submarine mortar was fitted aft to provide a short-range anti-submarine capability, while a hangar and helicopter deck allowed a single Westland Wasp helicopter to be operated, for longer range anti-submarine and anti-surface operations.

As built, Van Galen was fitted with a Signaal LW-03 long range air search radar on the ship's mainmast, with a DA02 medium range air/surface surveillance radar carried on the ship's foremast. M44 and M45 fire control radars were provided for the Seacat missiles and ships guns respectively. The ship had a sonar suite of Type 170B attack sonar and Type 162 bottom search sonar. The ship had a crew of 251.

=== Modifications ===
All six Van Speijks were modernised in the 1970s, using many of the systems used by the new Kortenaer-class frigates. The 4.5-inch gun was replaced by a single OTO Melara 76 mm and launchers for up to eight Harpoon anti-ship missiles fitted (although only two were normally carried). The hangar and flight deck were enlarged, allowing a Westland Lynx helicopter to be carried, while the Limbo mortar was removed, with a pair of triple Mk 32 torpedo launchers providing close-in anti-submarine armament. A Signaal DA03 radar replaced the DA02 radar and an American EDO Corporation CWE-610 sonar replaced the original British sonar. Van Galen was modernised at the Den Helder naval dockyard between 15 July 1977 and 30 November 1979.

== Dutch service history ==
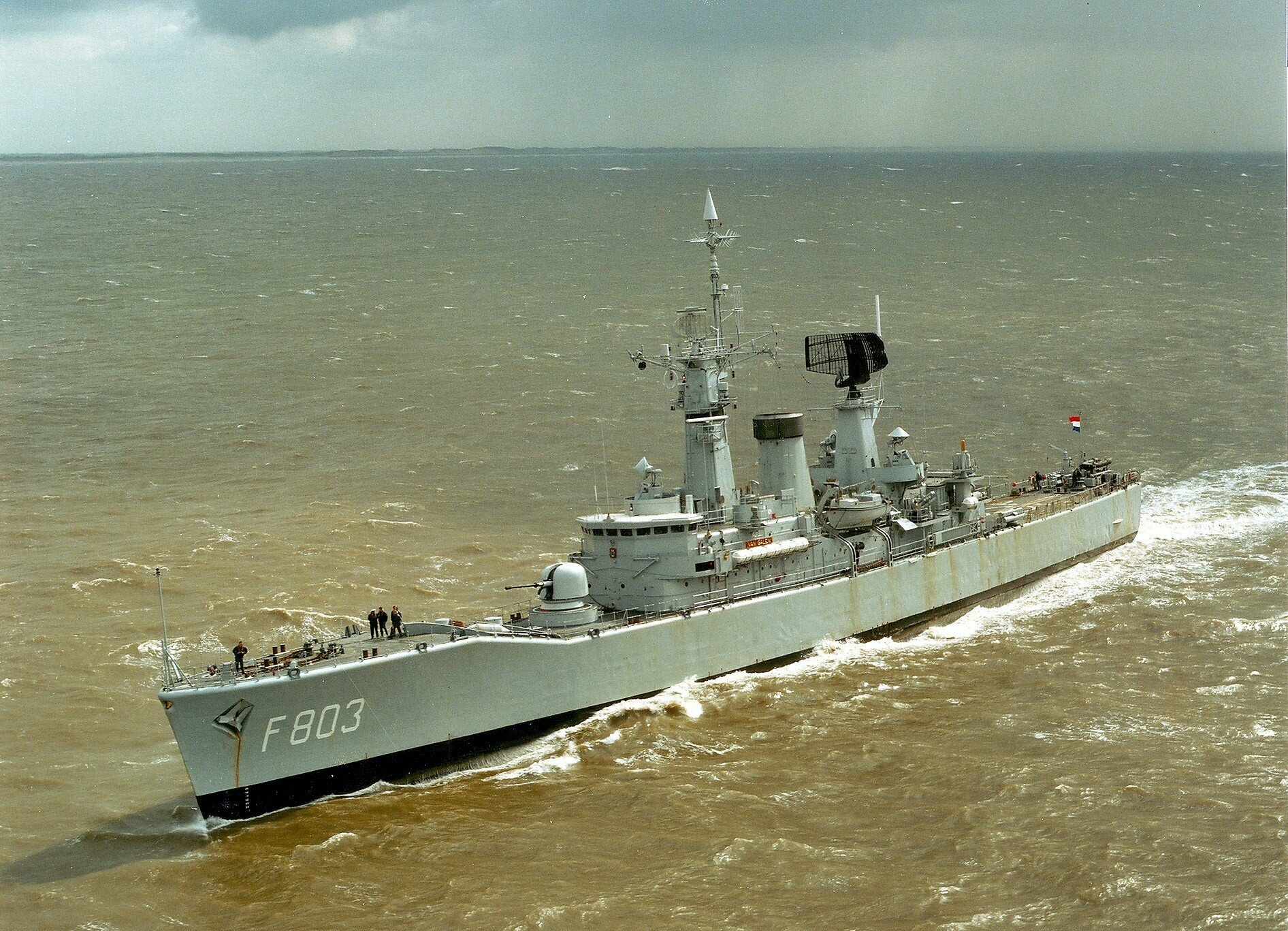
HNLMS Van Galen after the mid-life upgrade program.

An order for four Van Speijks was placed in 1962, with two more ordered in 1964. HNLMS Van Galen was built at the KM de Schelde in Vlissingen. The keel laying took place on 25 July 1963 and the launching on 19 June 1965. The ship was put into service on 1 March 1967 with the pennant number F803.

In 1970 Van Galen was sent, together with the Van Speijk, on a journey to the Far East.

In July 1976 Van Galen, together with the frigates Tromp, Van Nes, the destroyers Zeeland and Holland, the submarine Dolfijn and the replenishment ship Poolster visited New York in commemoration of the city's 200 years anniversary.

The ship received a mid-life modernization in Den Helder, starting on 15 July 1977 and lasting till 30 November 1979.

In 1986, she was put up for sale along with sister ships Van Speijk, Tjerk Hiddes and Van Nes. The four ships then were purchased by Indonesia. Van Galen was decommissioned in 1987 and transferred to the Indonesian Navy on 2 November 1987.

== Indonesian service history ==
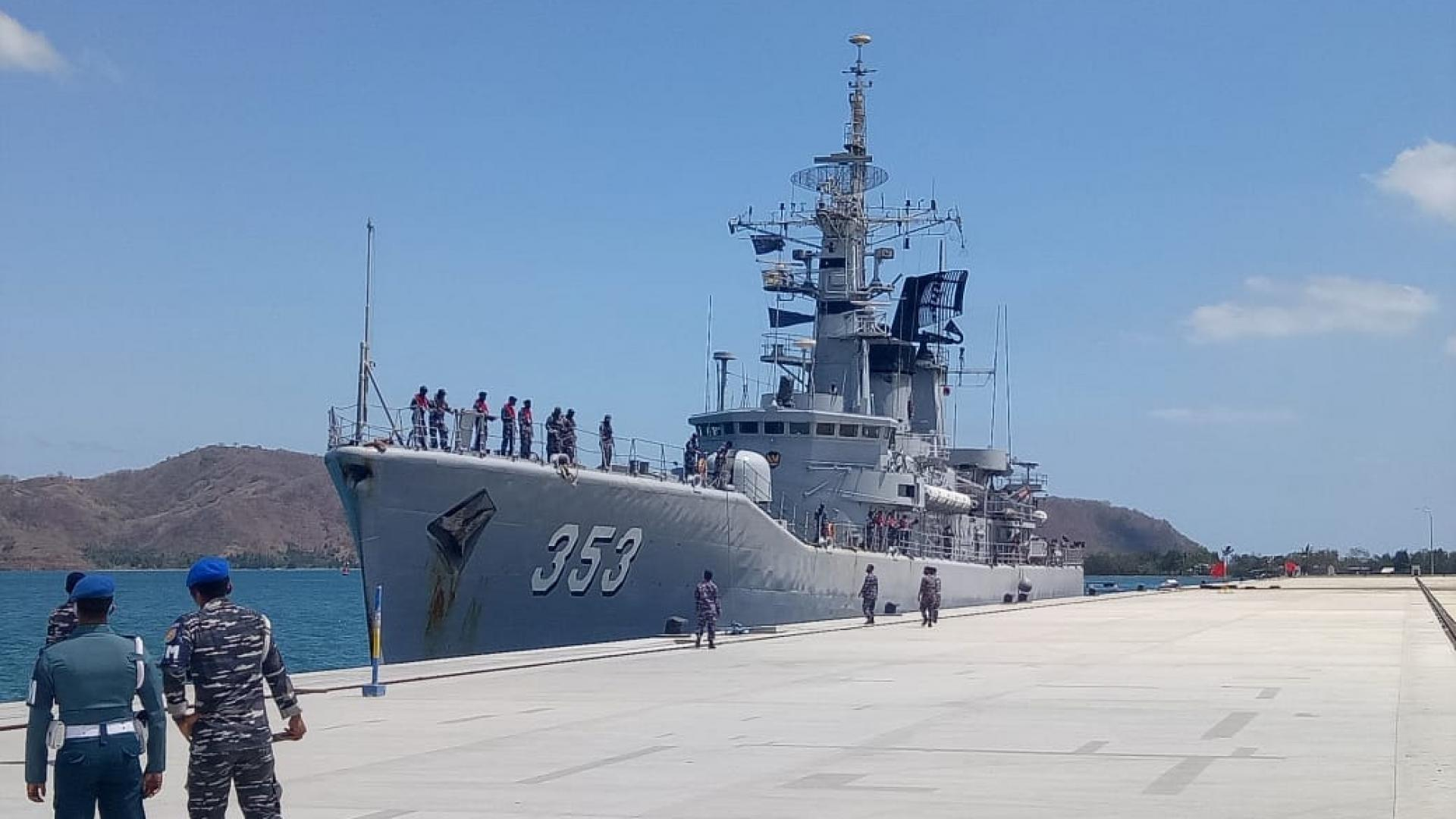
KRI Yos Sudarso on 4 September 2020.

On 11 February 1986, Indonesia and the Netherlands signed an agreement for transfer of two Van Speijk class with option on two more ships. The ship was transferred to Indonesia on 2 November 1987 and renamed as KRI Yos Sudarso, assigned with pennant number 353.

In 1992, KRI Yos Sudarso, along with KRI Ki Hajar Dewantara and KRI Teluk Banten intercepted Portuguese ship Lusitania Expresso in East Timor. Col. Widodo, deputy assistant of the Indonesian Navy's Eastern Fleet, told Radio Republik Indonesia from aboard the Indonesian warship KRI Yos Sudarso that the ferry entered Indonesian waters at 5:28 in the morning of 11 March 1992. At 6:07, Lusitania Expresso had traveled two to three nautical miles (3.7 to 5.6 km; 2.3 to 3.5 mi) into Indonesian territory and Captain Luis Dos Santos (Lusitania Expresso's captain) was ordered to leave immediately. Col. Widodo said the Portuguese ship's captain obeyed the order and turned his ship around and headed back to sea.

By 2002, the ships Seacat missiles were inoperable and it was reported that propulsion problems were badly effecting the availability of the ships of this class. The ship's Seacat launchers were therefore replaced by two Simbad twin launchers for Mistral anti-aircraft missiles, and Yos Sudarso was re-engined with two 10.9 megawatts (14,600 shp) Caterpillar 3616 diesel engines. As the Indonesian Navy retired Harpoon missile from its stockpiles, Yos Sudarso was rearmed with Chinese C-802 missiles.
