= Laut Strait =

- Selat Laut (Indonesian)
- Location within Kalimantan
- Coordinates: 3°25′00″S 116°03′00″E
- Type: strait
- Basin countries: Indonesia
- Max. length: 35 nautical miles (65 km; 40 mi)
- Max. width: 3 nautical miles (5.6 km; 3.5 mi)
- Min. width: 1 nautical mile (1.9 km; 1.2 mi)
- References: Selat Laut: Indonesia National Geospatial-Intelligence Agency, Bethesda, MD, USA

The Laut Strait (Indonesian: Selat Laut) separates Laut Island and Kalimantan, the Indonesian portion of the island of Borneo. It is an important commercial waterway to the port of Kotabaru from nearby Makassar Strait.

The length of the strait is about 35 nautical miles, connected to the Makassar Strait in the North and the Java Sea in the South. The widest part of this strait is in the Batulicin area which is about 3 nautical miles and the narrowest is 1 nautical mile in the Kotabaru area. There are four islands in the Laut strait, namely:

- Anak Suwangi Island.
- Bird Island.
- Tampakan Island.
- Suwangi Island.
