= Van Speijk-class frigate =

Frigates in the Royal Netherlands Navy

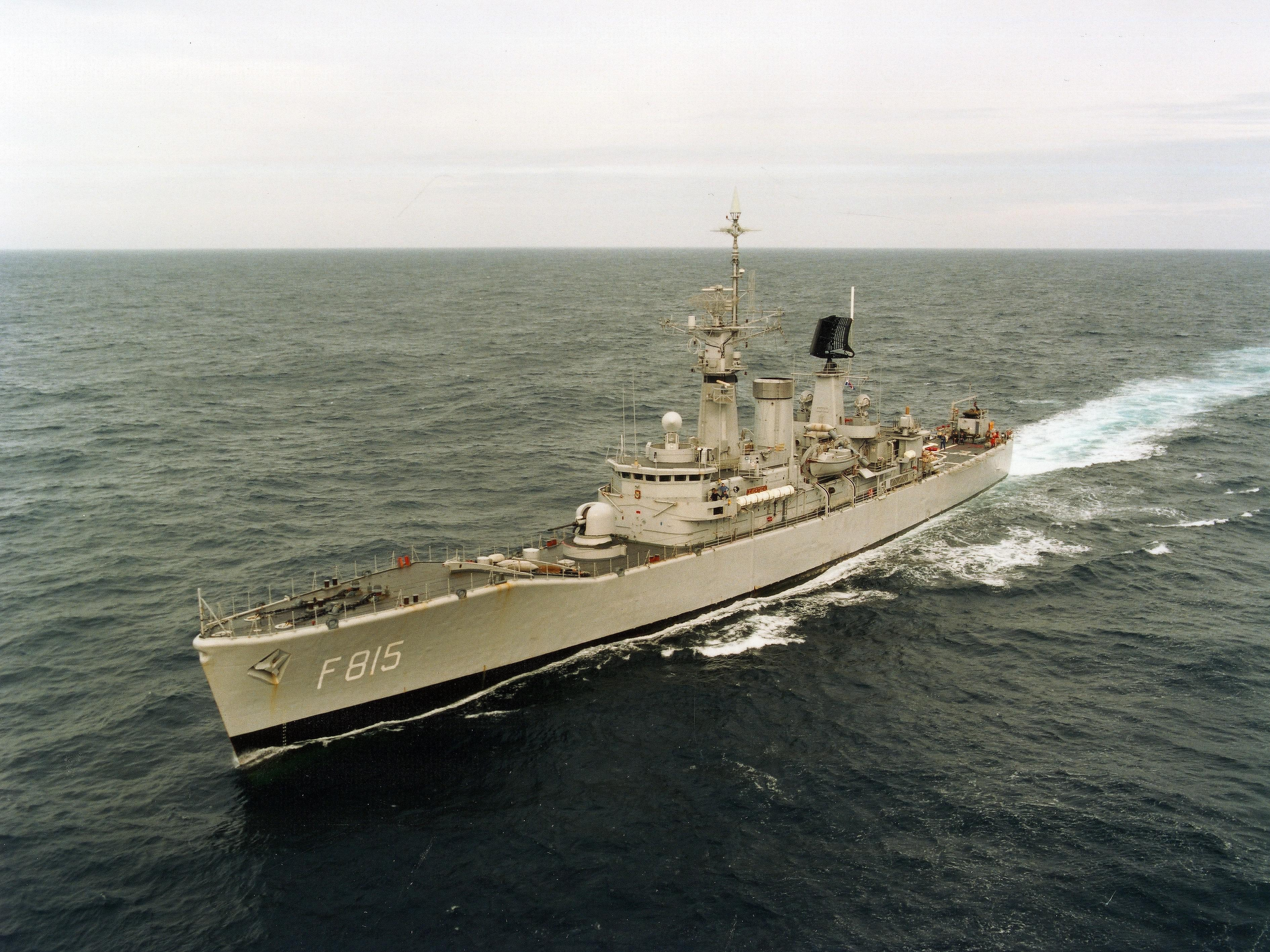
- HNLMS Evertsen (F815) in the 1980s.

Class overview
- Name: Van Speijk class
- Builders: Nederlandsche Dok en Scheepsbouw Maatschappij; Koninklijke Maatschappij De Schelde
- Operators: Royal Netherlands Navy; Indonesian Navy
- Preceded by: Van Amstel class
- Succeeded by: Kortenaer class
- Subclasses: Ahmad Yani class
- Built: 1963–1968
- In commission: 1967–1989 (Royal Netherlands Navy)
- Completed: 6
- Retired: 6 (all sold to Indonesia)

General characteristics
- Type: Frigate
- Displacement: 2,200 tons standard, 2,850 tons full load
- Length: 113.4 m (372 ft 1 in)
- Beam: 12.5 m (41 ft 0 in)
- Draught: 5.8 m (19 ft 0 in)
- Propulsion: In Dutch service; 2 x geared steam turbines; 22,370 kW (30,000 shp); 2 x shafts
- Speed: 28.5 knots (52.8 km/h; 32.8 mph)
- Range: 4,500 nmi (8,300 km; 5,200 mi) at 12 kn (22 km/h; 14 mph)
- Complement: "before rebuild" 254, "after rebuild" 180
- Sensors & processing systems: Radar: "as built" LW-02, DA-02, M45, "after rebuild" LW-03, DA-05, M45, M44; Sonar: Types 170B, 162; Combat system: SEWACO V
- Armament: "as built"; 2 × 4.5-inch guns (1 × twin mounting Mk6); 2 × Seacat surface-to-air missile launcher; 1 × ASW Limbo mortar; "after rebuild"; 1 × OTO Melara 76 mm gun; 2 × Seacat surface-to-air missile launcher; 8 x Harpoon anti-ship missiles; 2 x Mk 32 torpedo launchers
- Aircraft carried: 1x Westland Wasp, later replaced by Westland Lynx
- Aviation facilities: Hangar

The Van Speijk-class was a ship class of six frigates that were built in the Netherlands for the Royal Netherlands Navy. They were versions of the British Leander-class frigates with Dutch radars. The British design was chosen in order to enable rapid construction in order to replace elderly destroyer escorts and take up part of the NATO patrol duties of the decommissioned anti-submarine warfare carrier Karel Doorman. The ships were modernised in the late 1970s. All six ships were sold to the Indonesian Navy in 1986–1989 and five are still in service as the Ahmad Yani-class frigates.

== Dutch modifications ==
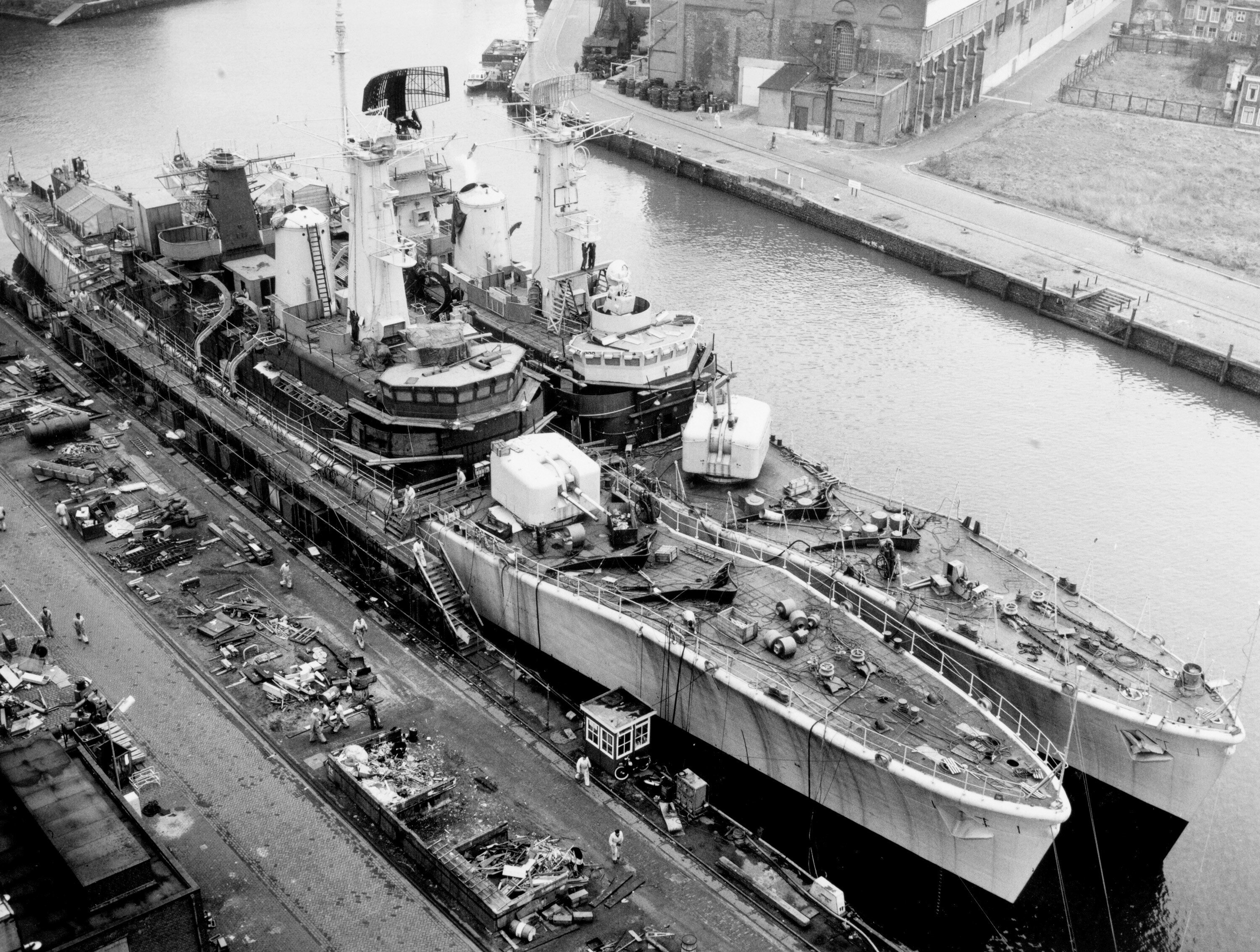
Van Nes and Van Galen under construction in 1966.

For the most part the Dutch limited their changes to the Leander design to a wholesale replacement of the original British electronics and electrical equipment by those from Dutch manufacturers. Hollandse Signaalapparaten supplied the entire electronics suite. Specifically their LW-02 long-range air-surveillance radar, the DA-02 medium-range air/surface search radar and the M45 combined radar and optical fire control system for the 4.5 in (110 mm) guns. The Dutch HSA M44 radar/visual director for the Seacat anti-aircraft missiles could automatically target in elevation and bearing and because of its much lighter weight, allowed the single Seacat launcher on the British ships to be increased to two launchers on the Dutch ships, each with their own director.

=== Mid-life modernization ===
Beginning in December 1976 each of the Dutch ships was given a mid-life modernization that took about two years to finish. The twin 4.5-inch turret was replaced by a single OTO Melara 76 mm gun and two quadruple mounts for Harpoon anti-ship missiles were fitted abaft of the funnel. The Mk 10 Limbo ASW mortar was replaced by a pair of triple Mk 32 torpedo launchers, one mount on each side of the hangar, and its mount plated over so the flight deck could be increased to allow the ship to carry the larger Westland Lynx helicopter in lieu of the Wasp carried earlier. The removal of the variable-depth sonar from the quarterdeck to the interior of the stern also allowed more room for the flight deck.

The electronics were also upgraded, the LW-02 radar was exchanged for a LW-03 and the DA-02 was replaced by a DA-05 radar. Most importantly an automated combat management system, SEWACO V, was fitted to aid the ship's captain in decision making. Its power plant was also extensively automated. All told these changes allowed the crew to decrease in size from 254 to about 175 which allowed greatly increased standards of habitability.

== Ships ==
All ships were named after Dutch naval officers. When sold to Indonesia, they were named after Indonesian National Armed Forces heroes.

Name	Pennant Number	Builder	Laid down	Launched	Completed	Fate
Van Speijk	F802	NDSM, Amsterdam	1 October 1963	5 March 1965	14 February 1967	Sold to Indonesia in 1986 as Slamet Riyadi (352), an Army Lieutenant Colonel killed in Fort Victoria, Maluku
Van Galen	F803	KM de Schelde, Vlissingen	25 July 1963	19 June 1965	1 March 1967	Sold to Indonesia in 1987 as Yos Sudarso (353), a Navy Commodore killed in Battle of Aru Sea
Tjerk Hiddes	F804	NDSM, Amsterdam	1 June 1964	17 December 1965	16 August 1967	Sold to Indonesia in 1986 as Ahmad Yani (351), an Army General killed in the 1965 coup d'état
Van Nes	F805	KM de Schelde, Vlissingen	25 July 1965	26 March 1966	9 August 1967	Sold to Indonesia in 1986 as Oswald Siahaan (354), a Navy hero killed in Battle of Sibolga Bay
Isaac Sweers	F814	NDSM, Amsterdam	5 May 1965	10 March 1967	15 May 1968	Sold to Indonesia as Karel Satsuitubun (356), a Police officer killed in 1965 PKI's coup d'état
Evertsen	F815	KM de Schelde, Vlissingen	6 July 1965	18 June 1966	21 December 1967	Sold to Indonesia in 1989 as Abdul Halim Perdanakusuma (355), an Air Force hero

== Indonesian service ==
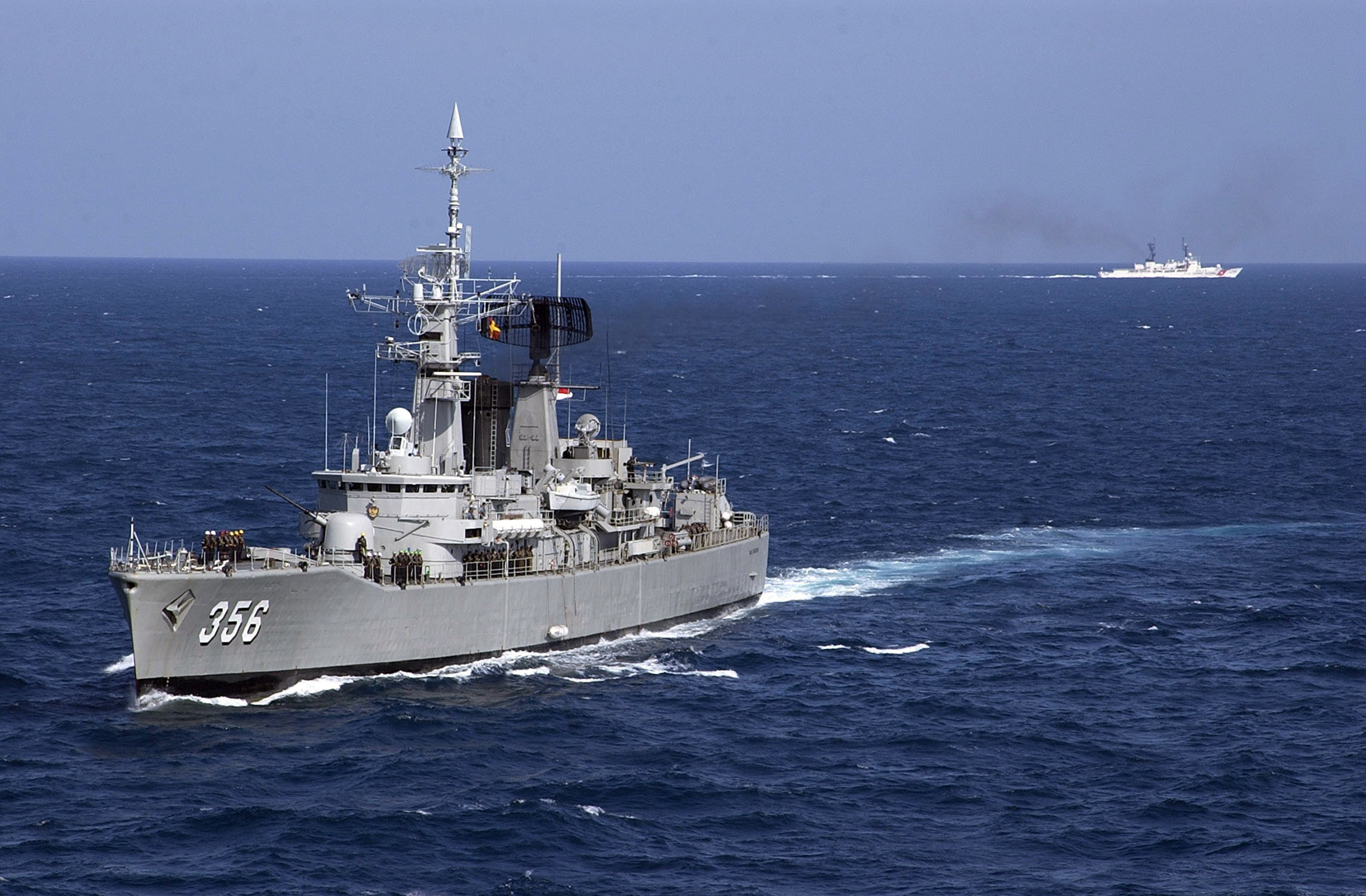
KRI Karel Satsuitubun in 2006.

At least some, if not all, of the Indonesian ships have replaced their Seacat launchers with two twin Simbad launchers. Recently, the two quadruple Harpoon launchers were also replaced by Yakhont missile (SS-N-26) launchers purchased from Russia, because the early version Harpoon missiles previously installed were nearing their obsolescence period. There are also some conflicting reports that the Harpoon missiles were replaced with Chinese-sourced C-802 rather than Russian Yakhont. There are some pictures circulating on the internet showing several vessels of the class carrying box launchers that look much too small to be Yakhont's launchers, but they are the right size for C-802.

Pictures released in March 2011 show that modifications were made to KRI Oswald Siahaan with 4 SS-26 Yakhont VLS cells located in the quarterdeck beside the helicopter hangar.

=== Engine replacement ===
In Indonesian service, the Van Speijk class is known as the Ahmad Yani class after the lead ship. All were named after Indonesian Armed Forces heroes. Between 2003 and 2008, all vessels of the Ahmad Yani class had their existing steam turbine engines replaced with diesel propulsion.

Engine/Gearbox	Power	Replacement date	Shipyard	Ships
2 x Caterpillar CAT DITA 3616, Reintjes WAV 1000 P gearboxes	16,000 hp (12,000 kW)	2007–2008	PT Tesco	351, 352, 353, 355
2 x Caterpillar CAT DITA 3612, Reintjes WAF 4566 gearboxes	12,000 hp (8,900 kW)	2003	PT Tesco	356
2 x SEMT Pielstick 12PA6B, Renk SWUF 98 gearboxes	11,800 hp (8,800 kW)	2006	PT PAL/PT Mulia	354

== See also ==
- List of frigates of the Netherlands

Equivalent frigates of the same era

- Alpino class
- Peder Skram class
- Condell class
- Brooke class
- Nilgiri class

== Citations ==
=== Bibliography ===
- Adamsn, Thomas A. (1982). John Roberts (ed.). Dutch Leanders: The Van Speijk Class. Warship. Vol. VI. London: Conway Maritime Press. pp. 192–4. ISBN 0-85177-265-X.
- Gardiner, Robert; Chumbley, Stephen; Budzbon, Przemysław, eds. (1995). Conway's All the World's Fighting Ships 1947–1995. Annapolis: Naval Institute Press. ISBN 1-55750-132-7.
- van Amstel, W.H.E. (1991). De schepen van de Koninklijke Marine vanaf 1945 (in Dutch). Alkmaar: De Alk. ISBN 90-6013-997-6.
