= KRI Oswald Siahaan =

Frigate of the Indonesian Navy

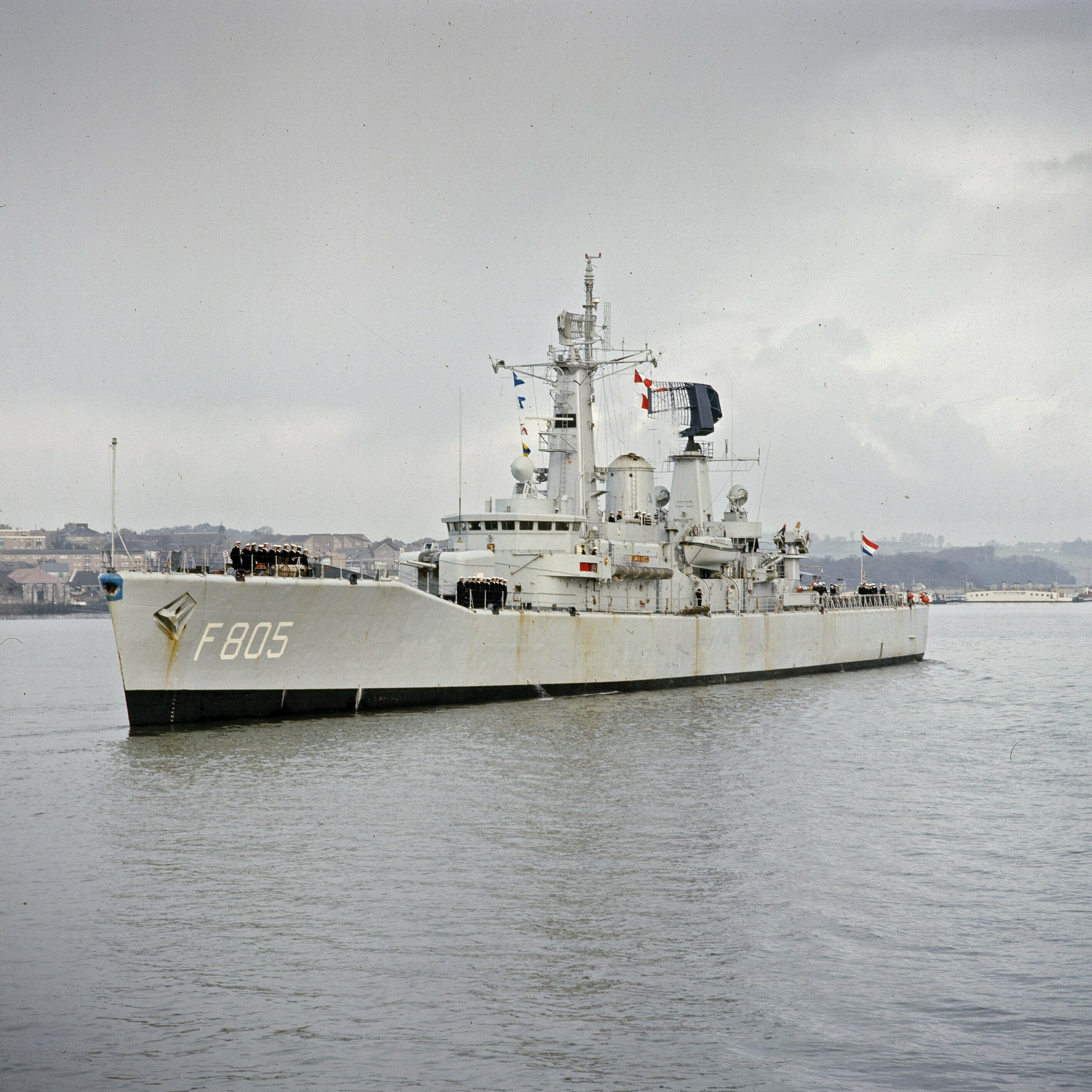
- HNLMS Van Nes in its original configuration

History

Netherlands
- Name: HNLMS Van Nes
- Namesake: Jan Jansse van Nes
- Laid down: 25 July 1963
- Launched: 26 March 1966
- Commissioned: 9 August 1966
- Decommissioned: February 1987
- Identification: Pennant number: F805
- Fate: Sold to Indonesia

Indonesia
- Name: KRI Oswald Siahaan
- Namesake: Lieutenant Oswald Siahaan
- Acquired: 11 February 1986
- Commissioned: 31 October 1988
- Identification: Pennant number: 354
- Status: In active service

General characteristics
- Class & type: Van Speijk-class frigate; Ahmad Yani-class frigate
- Displacement: 2,200 tons standard, 2,850 tons full load
- Length: 113.4 m (372 ft)
- Beam: 12.5 m (41 ft)
- Draught: 5.8 m (19 ft)
- Propulsion: As built; 2 x Babcock & Wilcox boilers; 2 x Werkspoor/English Electric steam turbines; 22,370 kW (30,000 shp); 2 x shafts; Rebuild; 2 x SEMT Pielstick 12 PA6B diesels; 10,600 kW (14,200 shp); 2 x shafts
- Speed: 28.5 kn (52.8 km/h; 32.8 mph); With new diesels - estimated max. 24 kn (44 km/h; 28 mph)
- Range: 4,500 nmi (8,300 km; 5,200 mi) at 12 kn (22 km/h; 14 mph)
- Complement: 180
- Sensors & processing systems: Radar: LW-03, DA-02, M45, M44; Sonar: Types 170B, 162; Combat system: SEWACO V
- Armament: as Oswald Siahaan; 4 × P-800 Yakhont SSM; 2 × twin Simbad launcher for Mistral SAMs; 1 × OTO Melara 76 mm gun; 4 × DShK 12.7 mm HMG; 2 × 3 – Mk 32 anti submarine torpedo tubes
- Aircraft carried: one NBO-105C
- Aviation facilities: Hangar

KRI Oswald Siahaan (354) is an Ahmad Yani-class frigate operated by the Indonesian Navy. Prior to her service in the Indonesian Navy, she served in the Royal Netherlands Navy as Van Speijk-class frigate HNLMS Van Nes (F805).

== Design and construction ==
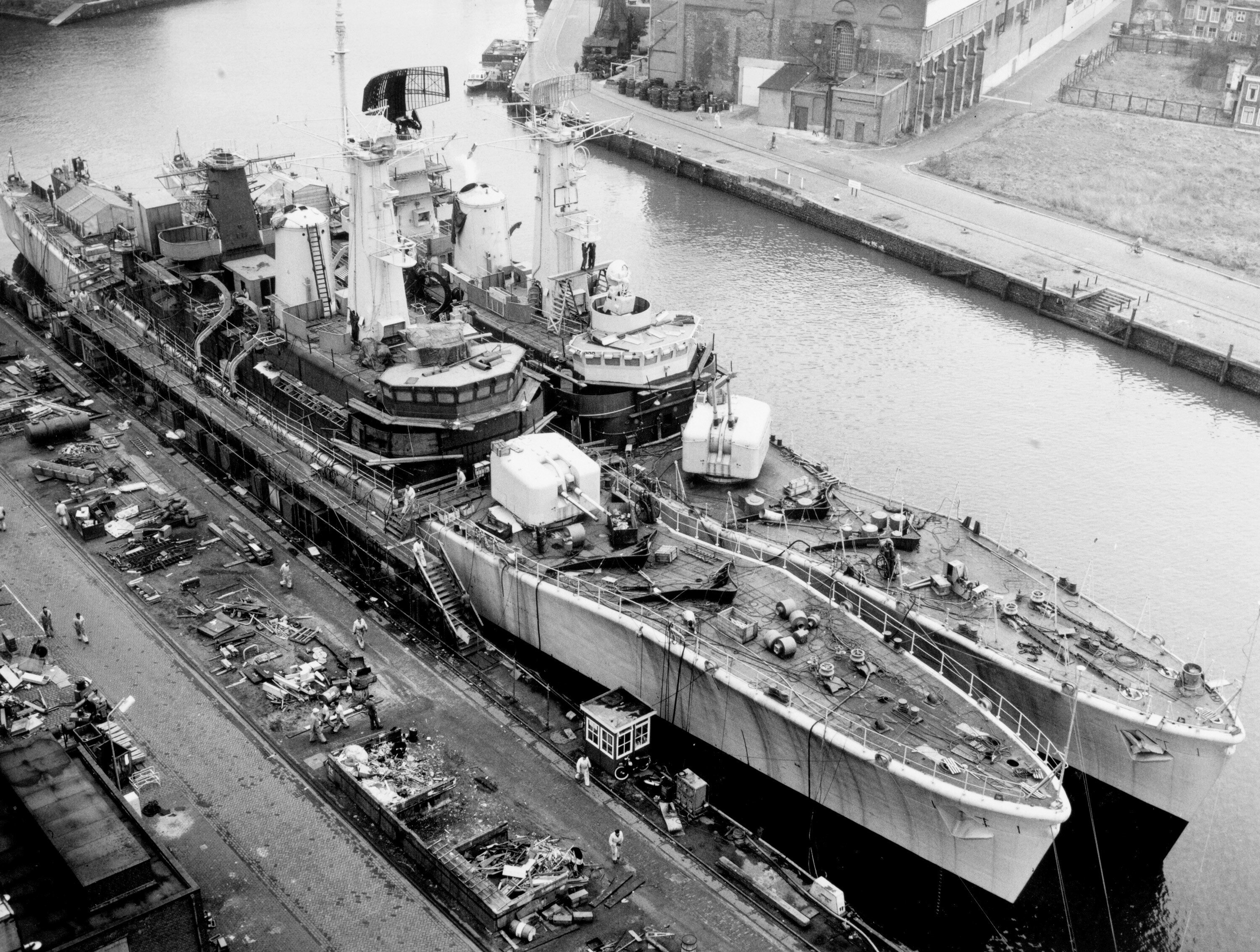
Van Nes and Van Galen under construction in 1966.

In the early 1960s, the Royal Netherlands Navy had an urgent requirement to replace its Van Amstel-class frigates, obsolete ex-American escorts built during the Second World War. To meet this requirement, it chose to build a modified version of the British Leander-class frigate as its Van Speijk class, using broadly the same armament as the original design, but where possible, substituting Dutch electronics and radars.

The Van Speijks were 113.4 m (372 ft) long overall and 109.7 m (360 ft) between perpendiculars, with a beam of 12.5 m (41 ft) and a draught of 5.8 m (19 ft). Displacement was 2,200 long tons (2,200 t) standard and 2,850 long tons (2,900 t) full load. Two Babcock & Wilcox boilers supplied steam to two sets of Werkspoor-English Electric double reduction geared steam turbines rated at 30,000 shp (22,000 kW) and driving two propeller shafts. This gave a speed of 28.5 kn (32.8 mph; 52.8 km/h).

A twin 4.5-inch (113 mm) Mark 6 gun mount was fitted forward. Anti-aircraft defence was provided by two quadruple Sea Cat surface-to-air missile launchers on the hangar roof. A Limbo anti-submarine mortar was fitted aft to provide a short-range anti-submarine capability, while a hangar and helicopter deck allowed a single Westland Wasp helicopter to be operated, for longer range anti-submarine and anti-surface operations.

As built, Van Nes was fitted with a Signaal LW-03 long range air search radar on the ship's mainmast, with a DA02 medium range air/surface surveillance radar carried on the ship's foremast. M44 and M45 fire control radars were provided for the Seacat missiles and ships guns respectively. The ship had a sonar suite of Type 170B attack sonar and Type 162 bottom search sonar. The ship had a crew of 251, later reduced to 180.

=== Modifications ===
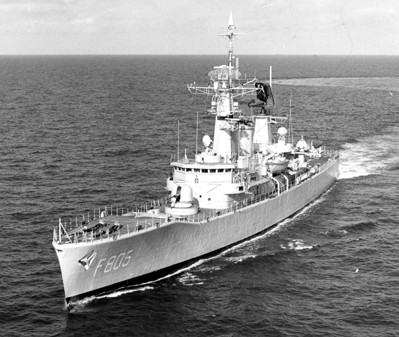
HNLMS Van Nes after modernisation

All six Van Speijks were modernised in the 1970s, using many of the systems used by the new Kortenaer-class frigates. The 4.5-inch gun was replaced by a single OTO Melara 76 mm and launchers for up to eight Harpoon anti-ship missiles fitted (although only two were normally carried). The hangar and flight deck were enlarged, allowing a Westland Lynx helicopter to be carried, while the Limbo mortar was removed, with a pair of triple Mk 32 torpedo launchers providing close-in anti-submarine armament. A Signaal DA03 radar replaced the DA02 radar and an American EDO Corporation CWE-610 sonar replaced the original British sonar. Van Nes was modernised at the Den Helder naval dockyard between 31 March 1978 and 28 November 1980.

In Indonesian service, the ship was refitted several times. The two quad Sea Cat short-range SAM were replaced by two twin Simbad launchers for Mistral short-range SAM. She is also fitted with two single 12.7 mm DShK heavy machine guns. Oswald Siahaan was then modernized by PT Mulia and PT PAL, which was completed in 2006. The ship's was re-engined with two 10,600 kW (14,200 shp) SEMT Pielstick 12 PA6B diesel engines. As the Indonesian Navy retired Harpoon missile from its stockpiles, Oswald Siahaan was rearmed with Russian Yakhont missiles.

== Service history ==
The ship was previously operated by the Royal Netherlands Navy as the Van Speijk-class frigate HNLMS Van Nes (F805). Van Nes was laid down on 25 July 1963, launched on 26 March 1966, commissioned on 9 August 1966 and decommissioned in February 1987. On 11 February 1986, Indonesia and the Netherlands signed an agreement for transfer of two Van Speijk class with option on two more ships. The ship was transferred to Indonesia on 31 October 1988 where it received its current name.

In May 2016, Oswald Siahaan seized a Chinese trawler, the Gui Bei Yu (27088), in the waters of Natuna Islands, firing shots at the trawler and blocking an attempt by a Chinese coast guard ship to rescue the fishing ship - which was taken under Indonesian custody.

== Bibliography ==
- Blackman, Raymond V. B., ed. (1971). Jane's Fighting Ships 1971–72. London: Sampson Low Marston & Co., Ltd. ISBN 0-354-00096-9.
- Couhat, Jean Labayle; Baker, A. D., eds. (1986). Combat Fleets of the World 1986/87. Annapolis, Maryland, USA: Naval Institute Press. ISBN 0-85368-860-5.
- Gardiner, Robert; Chumbley, Stephen, eds. (1995). Conway's All The World's Fighting Ships 1947–1995. Annapolis, Maryland, USA: Naval Institute Press. ISBN 1-55750-132-7.
- Moore, John, ed. (1979). Jane's Fighting Ships 1979–1980. London: Jane's Yearbooks. ISBN 0-354-00587-1.
- Moore, John, ed. (1984). Jane's Fighting Ships 1984-85. London: Jane's Yearbooks. ISBN 978-0710607959.
- Prézelin, Bernard; Baker, A. D. III, eds. (1990). The Naval Institute Guide to Combat Fleets of the World 1990/1991. Annapolis, Maryland, USA: Naval Institute Press. ISBN 0-87021-250-8.
- Saunders, Stephan, ed. (2009). Jane's Fighting Ships 2009-2010. Jane's Information Group. ISBN 978-0-7106-2888-6.
