= List of destroyers of the Netherlands =

This is a list of destroyers of the Netherlands navy.

== Pre World War II ==
- Wolf class
  - Wolf
  - Fret
  - Bulhond
  - Jakhals
  - Hermelijn
  - Lynx
  - Vos
  - Panter

== World War II ==
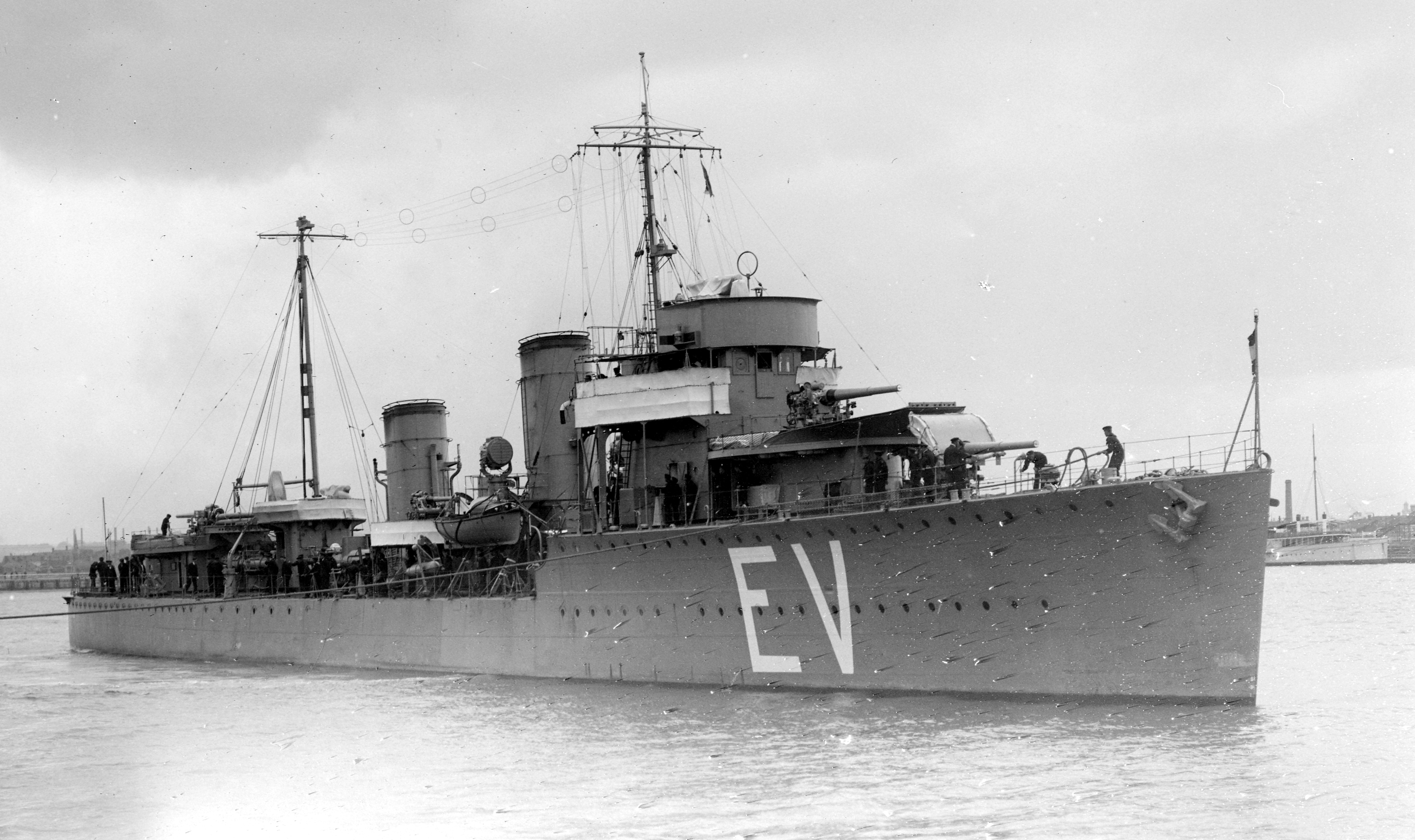
Evertsen

- Admiralen class
  - Van Ghent (ex-De Ruyter)
  - Evertsen
  - Kortenaer
  - Piet Hein
  - Van Galen
  - Witte de With
  - Banckert
  - Van Nes

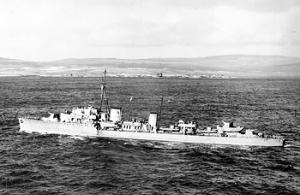
Isaac Sweers

- Gerard Callenburgh class
  - Gerard Callenburgh (commissioned as the German ZH1)
  - Isaac Sweers
  - Tjerk Hiddes (never completed)
  - Philips Van Almonde (never completed)
- British N class
  - Tjerk Hiddes (ex-Noble)
  - Van Galen (ex-Nonpareil)
- British Q class
  - Banckert (ex-Quilliam)
- British S class
  - Evertsen (ex-Scourge)
  - Kortenaer (ex-Scorpion)
  - Piet Hein (ex-Serapis)

== After World War II ==
- Holland class (Type 47A)
  - Holland
  - Zeeland
  - Noord-Brabant
  - Gelderland

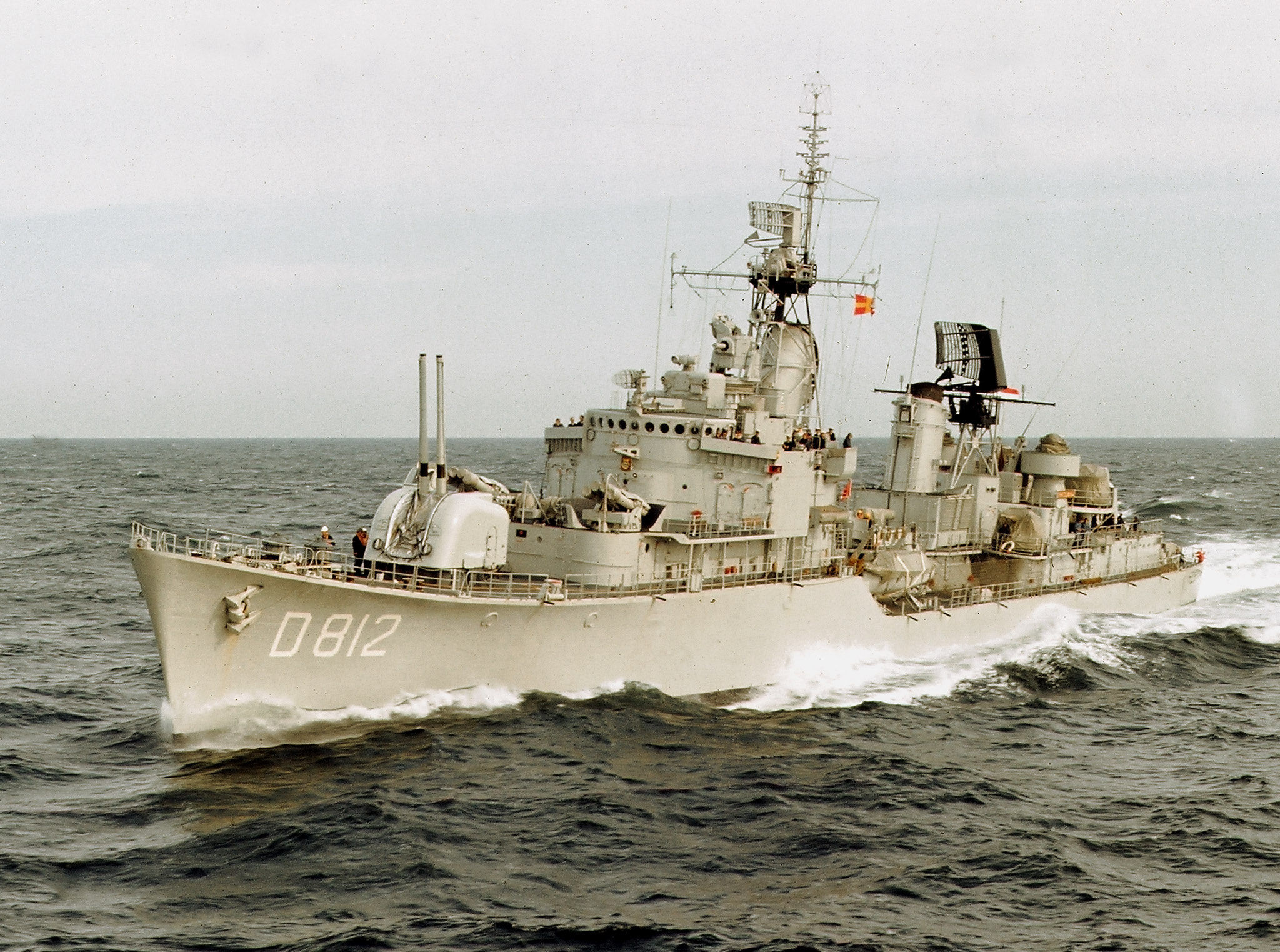
Friesland

- Friesland class (Type 47B)
  - Friesland
  - Groningen
  - Limburg
  - Overijssel
  - Drenthe
  - Utrecht
  - Rotterdam
  - Amsterdam
