= Tromp-class frigate =

Class of Dutch frigates

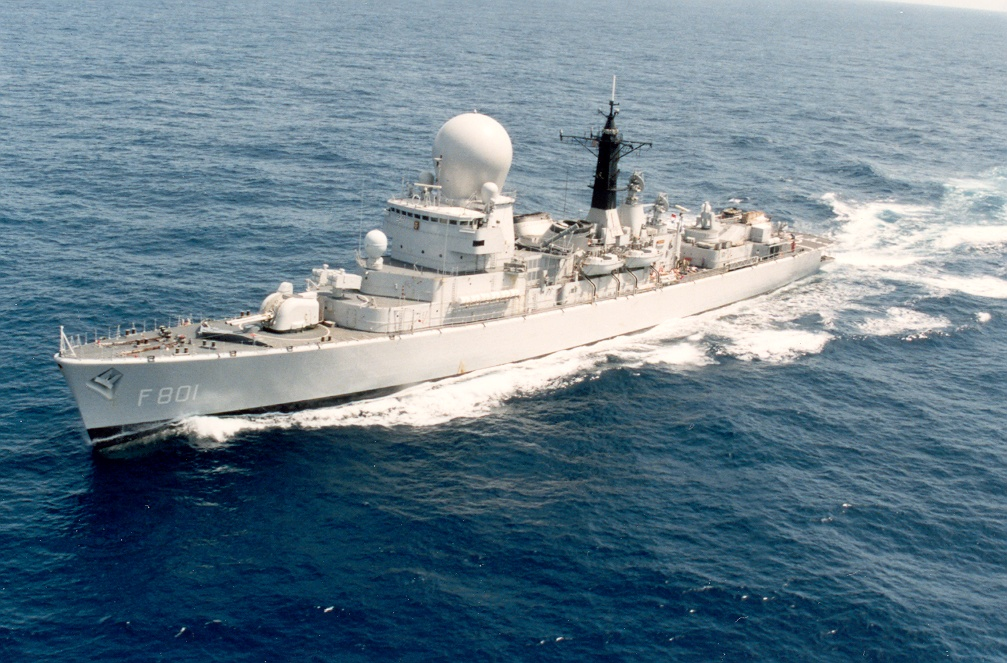
- HNLMS Tromp in 1995

Class overview
- Name: Tromp class
- Builders: Koninklijke Maatschappij De Schelde
- Operators: Royal Netherlands Navy
- Preceded by: De Zeven Provinciën-class
- Succeeded by: De Zeven Provinciën class
- Built: 1971–1974
- In commission: 1975–2000
- Completed: 2
- Retired: 2

General characteristics
- Type: Frigate
- Displacement: 4,308 long tons (4,377 t) standard; 5,400 long tons (5,487 t) full load
- Length: 138.4 m (454 ft 1 in)
- Beam: 14.8 m (48 ft 7 in)
- Draught: 4.6 m (15 ft 1 in)
- Propulsion: 2 shaft COGOG; Rolls-Royce Olympus gas turbine 54,000 hp (40,268 kW); Rolls-Royce Tyne gas turbine 8,200 hp (6,115 kW)
- Speed: 30 knots (35 mph; 56 km/h) maximum; 18 knots (21 mph; 33 km/h) cruising
- Range: 5,000 nmi (9,300 km) at 18 kn (21 mph; 33 km/h)
- Complement: 306
- Sensors & processing systems: AN/SPS-01 3D air search radar; Decca 1226 navigation radar; WM-25 fire control radar; AN/SPG-51C fire control radar; CWE-610 bow sonar; Type 162 bottom search sonar
- Electronic warfare & decoys: RAMSES jammer; Mk.36 SBROC
- Armament: 1 × Mark 13 launcher for Standard SAM (40 reload missiles); 1 × Mark 29 (octuple) Sea Sparrow SAM (16 missiles); 8 × Mark 141 launcher for RGM-84 Harpoon SSM; 2 × 120 mm Bofors guns (1 twin turret – turrets were salvaged from HNLMS Gelderland, a Holland class destroyer); 2 × Triple anti-submarine torpedo tubes; 1 × Goalkeeper short-range defence-system
- Aircraft carried: 1 × Westland WG-13 Lynx Mk.25/27/81/SH-14D maritime helicopter
- Aviation facilities: 1 helicopter pad & hangar

The Tromp class were two frigates built for the Royal Netherlands Navy during the 1970s to replace the De Zeven Provinciën-class cruisers as squadron flagships.

The Tromp-class frigates entered service in 1975 and 1976 and served until 1999 and 2001. Both ships were built by Royal Schelde Shipyard in Flushing (Vlissingen). The ships served as fleet flagships and area air defence vessels. Their 3D radar under a large polyester radome gave the ships the nickname "Kojak" in the Netherlands Navy. Originally the ships were to have the British Sea Dart missile system, but this was changed to the more compact American Standard surface-to-air missile.

The ships were replaced by the De Zeven Provinciën-class frigates. A total of four new frigates have been built, including two also named Tromp and De Ruyter.

== Design ==
=== Armament ===
The Tromp class frigates were armed with twin (1x2) Bofors 120 mm automatic naval guns with each gun being able to fire 38 to 42 shots per minute at a maximum distance of 21.6 kilometers. Initially the British 4.5-inch naval gun and French 100 mm naval gun were also considered, alongside the Bofors guns. However, as a result of austerity measures it was decided that the Bofors guns were a better option financially. The Bofors guns were refurbished naval guns that had been removed from the HNLMS Gelderland. Before installation they were extensively modified and modernized with the help of Wilton-Fijenoord. This resulted in the naval guns becoming considerable more accurate.

== Service history ==
In 1977 and 1979 the aluminium deckhouses on both ships were repaired at the shipyard of Koninklijke Maatschappij De Schelde after cracks had been found. As a result all succeeding frigates of the Royal Netherlands Navy had deckhouses made of steel.

In July 1981 the Soviet aircraft carrier Kiev entered the North Sea and was escorted by both ships of the Tromp-class.

Between 1981 and 1982 Fokker delivered 3 new large radomes for the Tromp-class frigates (one for each ship and one for reserve).

== Ships ==
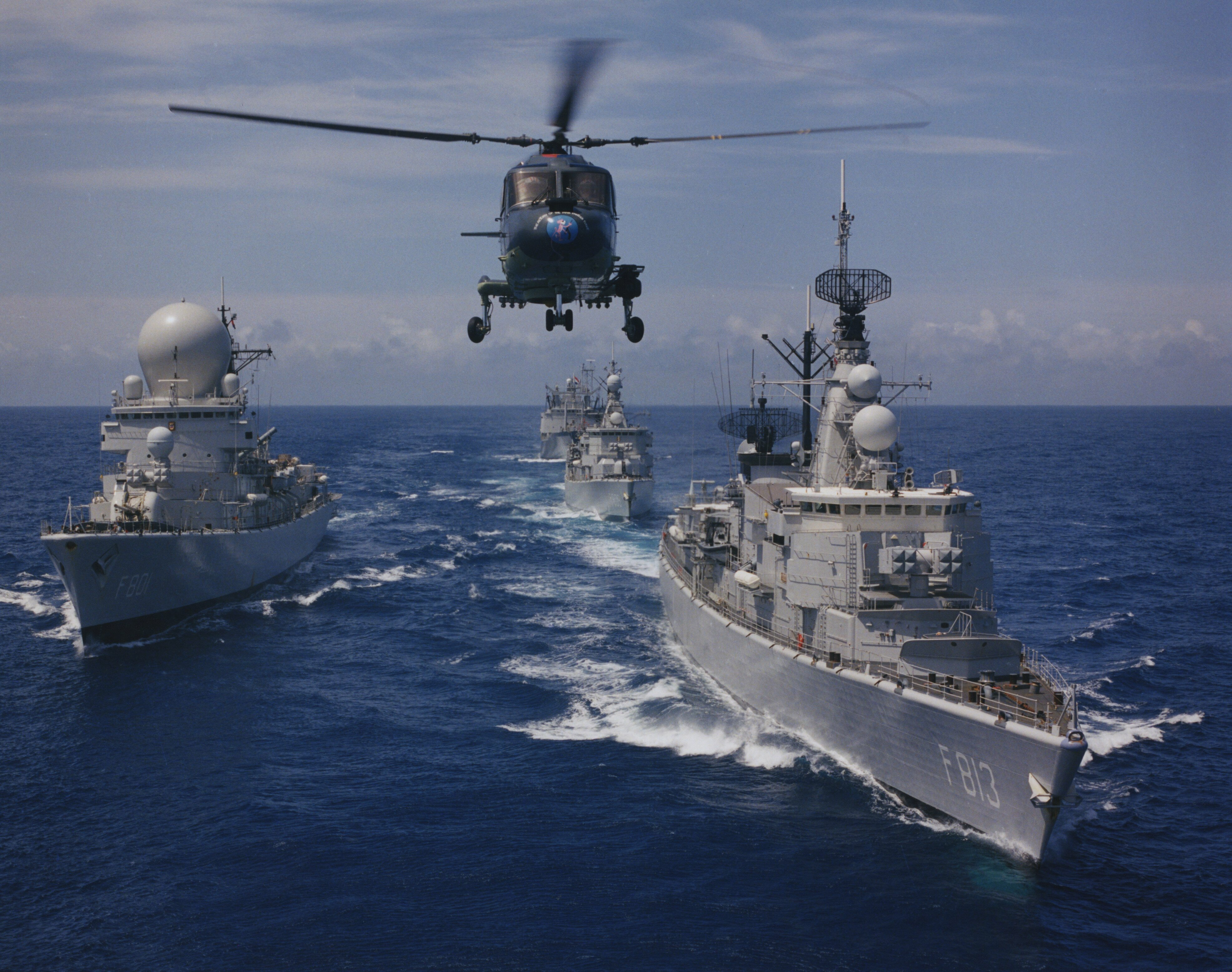
Tromp in convoy with several others in 1992.

Name	Pennant	Builder	Laid down	Launched	Commissioned	Fate
Tromp	F801	KM de Schelde, Vlissingen	4 August 1971	2 June 1973	3 October 1975	decommissioned 1999. Her gun has been preserved by the Dutch Navy Museum.
De Ruyter	F806	KM de Schelde, Vlissingen	22 December 1971	9 March 1974	3 June 1976	decommissioned 2001. Her bridge and radar have been preserved by the Dutch Navy Museum in Den Helder, North Holland.

== See also ==
- List of frigates of the Netherlands
- List of frigate classes by country

Equivalent frigates of the same era

- Tourville class
- Type 22
- Baleares class
- Suffren class
- Oliver Hazard Perry class

== Notes ==
=== Bibliography ===
- Gardiner, Robert; Chumbley, Stephen; Budzbon, Przemysław, eds. (1995). Conway's All the World's Fighting Ships 1947–1995. Annapolis: Naval Institute Press. ISBN 1-55750-132-7.
- Grove, Eric J. (1990). NATO Major Warships: Europe. London: Tri-Service Press. ISBN 1-85400-006-3.
- Miller, David, ed. (1997). Jane's Major Warships. Vol. 2. Coulsdon, Surrey: Jane's Information Group. ISBN 0-7106-1720-8.
- Nooteboom, S.G. (2001). Deugdelijke schepen: marinescheepsbouw 1945-1995 (in Dutch). Zaltbommel: Europese Bibliotheek. ISBN 90-288-2637-8.
- Woudstra, F.G.A. (1982). Onze Koninklijke Marine (in Dutch). Alkmaar: De Alk. ISBN 90-6013-915-1.
