= HNLMS Sorido =

History

Netherlands
- Name: T 201
- Operator: Dienst van Scheepsvaart
- In service: 1945
- Out of service: 1949

Netherlands
- Name: Sorido
- Operator: Royal Netherlands Navy
- Acquired: 1949
- In service: 1949
- Out of service: 1960
- Fate: Expended as target ship on 23 August 1960

General characteristics
- Type: Tugboat
- Displacement: 165 t (162 long tons)
- Length: 22.86 m (75 ft 0 in)
- Beam: 5.28 m (17 ft 4 in)
- Draught: 2.74 m (9 ft 0 in)
- Propulsion: Crossley HRC 4 diesel engine
- Speed: 8 knots (15 km/h; 9.2 mph)

HNLMS Sorido was a tugboat that served between 1949 and 1960 in the Royal Netherlands Navy (RNLN). She was originally built in the United States for the Dienst van Scheepsvaart as T 201, but was transferred to the RNLN in August 1949. On 2 August 1960 she was decommissioned and later, on 23 August, expended as target ship for the Netherlands Naval Aviation Service.

== Design and construction ==
Sorido was built in 1945 in the United States originally for the Dienst van Scheepsvaart (DvS). She had a length of 22.86 metres (75 ft 0 in), a beam of 5.28 metres (17 ft 4 in) and a draught of 2.74 metres (9 ft 0 in). Furthermore, Sorido had a displacement of 165 tons and was equipped with Crossley HRC 4 diesel engines, which allowed her to reach a maximum speed of 8 knots (15 km/h; 9.2 mph).

== Service history ==
While in service of the DvS Sorido was named T 201. In August 1949 T 201 was transferred to the Royal Netherlands Navy (RNLN) and stationed in Dutch New Guinea. While in service of the RNLN she was at first named Con, but this was changed in 1953 to Sorido. Her name was derived from the harbor of Biak, which was located in the Sorido lagoon.

On 24 July 1956 Sorido left Biak to assist with pulling MS Bengalen off a reef. However, after arriving Wambrau had already pulled Bengalen free.

Between 1958 and 1959 Sorido, together with Wambrau, provided port towage services at Biak.

== Citations ==
=== Bibliography ===
- van Amstel, W.H.E. (1991). De schepen van de Koninklijke Marine vanaf 1945 (in Dutch). Alkmaar: De Alk. ISBN 90-6013-997-6.
