= HNLMS De Ruyter (F806) =

Dutch frigate in service from 1976 to 2001

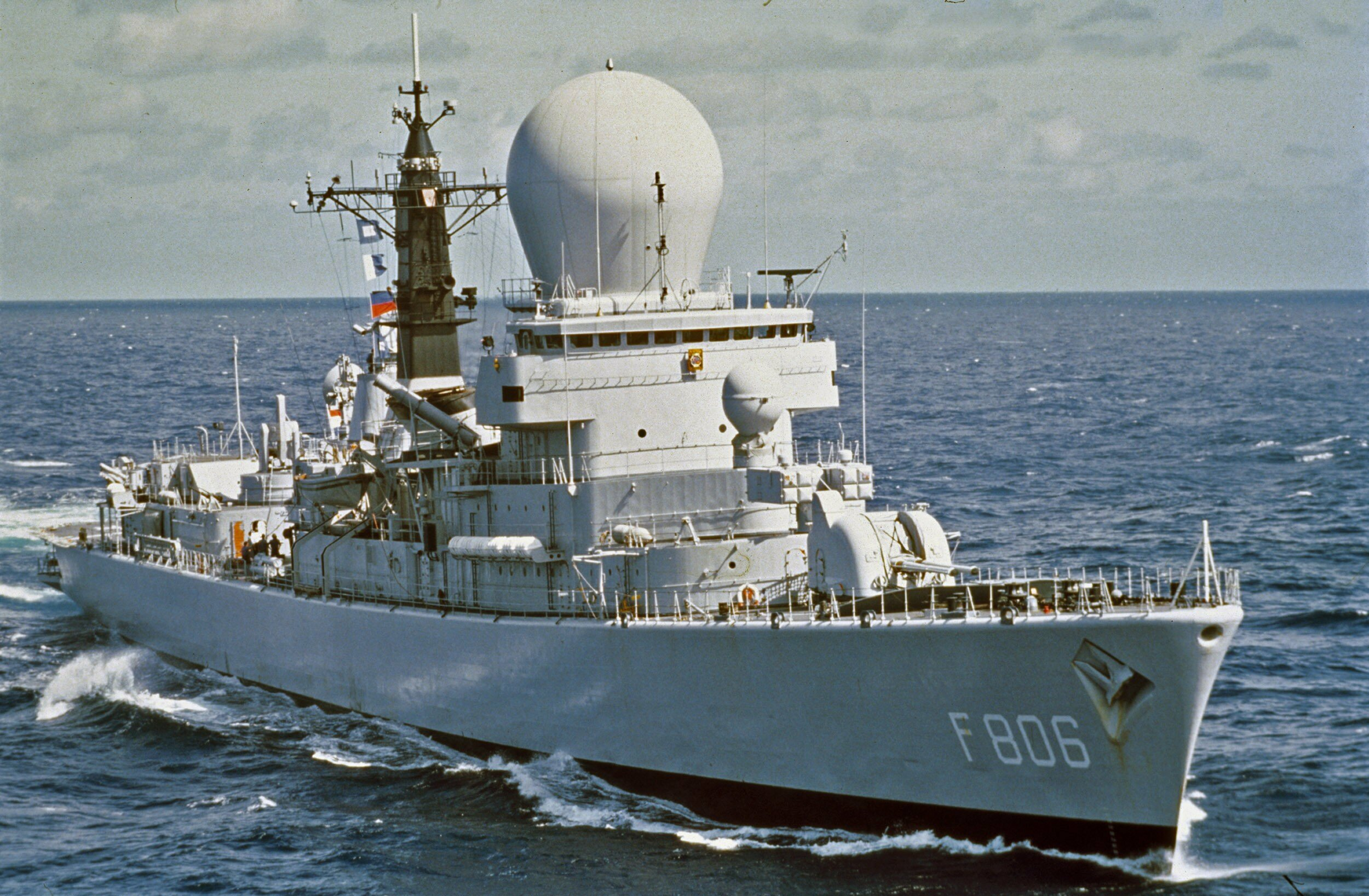
- HNLMS De Ruyter at sea

History

Netherlands
- Name: De Ruyter
- Namesake: Michiel de Ruyter
- Builder: KM de Schelde, Vlissingen
- Laid down: 22 December 1971
- Launched: 9 March 1974
- Commissioned: 3 June 1976
- Decommissioned: 3 October 2001
- Fate: Broken up

General characteristics
- Type: Tromp class
- Displacement: 3,665 long tons (3,724 t) standard; 4,308 long tons (4,377 t) full load
- Length: 133.2 m (437 ft 0 in)
- Beam: 14.8 m (48 ft 7 in)
- Draught: 6.6 m (21 ft 8 in)
- Propulsion: 2 shaft COGOG; Rolls-Royce Olympus gas turbine 44,000 hp (32,811 kW); Rolls-Royce Tyne gas turbine 8,200 hp (6,115 kW)
- Speed: 28 knots (32 mph; 52 km/h) maximum; 18 knots (21 mph; 33 km/h) cruising
- Range: 5,000 nmi (9,300 km) at 18 kn (21 mph; 33 km/h)
- Complement: 306
- Sensors & processing systems: Radar SPS-01, WM-25, SPG-51C; Sonar CWE-610, type 162
- Armament: 1 × launcher for Standard SAM (40 missiles); 1 × octuple Sea Sparrow SAM (16 missiles); 8 × RGM-84 Harpoon SSM; 2 × 120 mm Bofors guns (1 twin turret – turrets were salvaged from HNLMS Gelderland, a Holland class destroyer); Triple anti-submarine torpedo tubes; 1 × Goalkeeper short-range defence-system
- Aircraft carried: 1 × Westland Lynx helicopter
- Aviation facilities: 1 helicopter pad & hangar

HNLMS De Ruyter (F806) (Dutch: Hr.Ms. De Ruyter) was a frigate of the Tromp class. The ship was in service with the Royal Netherlands Navy from 1976 to 2001. The frigate was named after Dutch naval hero Michiel de Ruyter. The ship's radio call sign was "PAEP".

== Service history ==
HNLMS De Ruyter was one of two Tromp-class frigates and was built at the KM de Schelde in Vlissingen. The keel laying took place on 22 December 1971 and the launching on 9 March 1974. The ship was put into service on 3 June 1976.

The De Ruyter and the frigates Callenburgh, Jan van Brakel, Van Kinsbergen and the replenishment ship Poolster departed from Den Helder on 13 January 1986 for a trip to the Far East to show the flag and promote Dutch trade. The ships returned on 19 June.

During the mid-90s the ship was part of Standing Naval Forces Mediterranean (STANAVFORMED) and helped to enforce an embargo for the coast of Yugoslavia.

On 3 October 2001 the vessel was decommissioned and later scrapped. The bridge with radar dome of De Ruyter are preserved at the Dutch Navy Museum in Den Helder.
