= HNLMS Tromp (F801) =

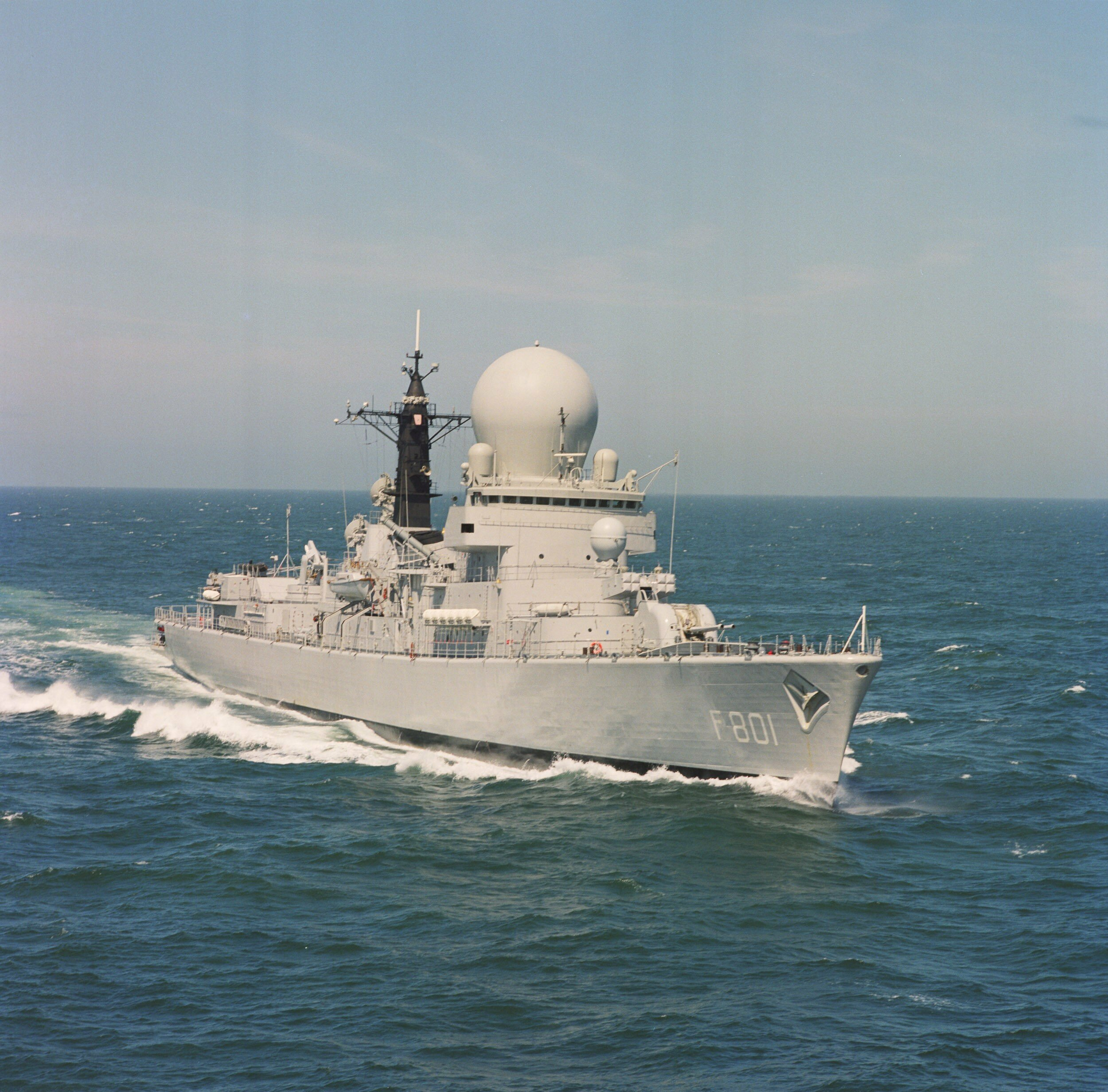
- Tromp during sea trials after significant upgrades in 1988

History

Netherlands
- Name: Tromp
- Builder: KM de Schelde, Vlissingen
- Laid down: 4 August 1971
- Launched: 3 June 1973
- Commissioned: 3 October 1975
- Decommissioned: 1999
- Fate: Broken up

General characteristics
- Type: Tromp class
- Displacement: 3,665 long tons (3,724 t) standard; 4,308 long tons (4,377 t) full load
- Length: 133.2 m (437 ft 0 in)
- Beam: 14.8 m (48 ft 7 in)
- Draught: 6.6 m (21 ft 8 in)
- Propulsion: 2 shaft COGOG; Rolls-Royce Olympus gas turbine 44,000 hp (32,811 kW); Rolls-Royce Tyne gas turbine 8,200 hp (6,115 kW)
- Speed: 28 knots (32 mph; 52 km/h) maximum; 18 knots (21 mph; 33 km/h) cruising
- Range: 5,000 nmi (9,300 km) at 18 kn (21 mph; 33 km/h)
- Complement: 306
- Sensors & processing systems: Radar SPS-01, WM-25, SPG-51C; Sonar CWE-610, type 162
- Armament: 1 × launcher for Standard SAM (40 missiles); 1 × octuple Sea Sparrow SAM (16 missiles); 8 × RGM-84 Harpoon SSM; 2 × 120 mm Bofors guns (1 twin turret – turrets were salvaged from HNLMS Gelderland, a Holland class destroyer); Triple anti-submarine torpedo tubes; 1 × Goalkeeper short-range defence-system
- Aircraft carried: 1 × Westland Lynx helicopter
- Aviation facilities: 1 helicopter pad & hangar

HNLMS Tromp (F801) (Dutch: Hr.Ms. Tromp) was a frigate of the Tromp class. The ship was in service with the Royal Netherlands Navy from 1975 to 1999. The frigate was named after Dutch naval hero Tromp. The ship's radio call sign was "PADE".

== Service history ==
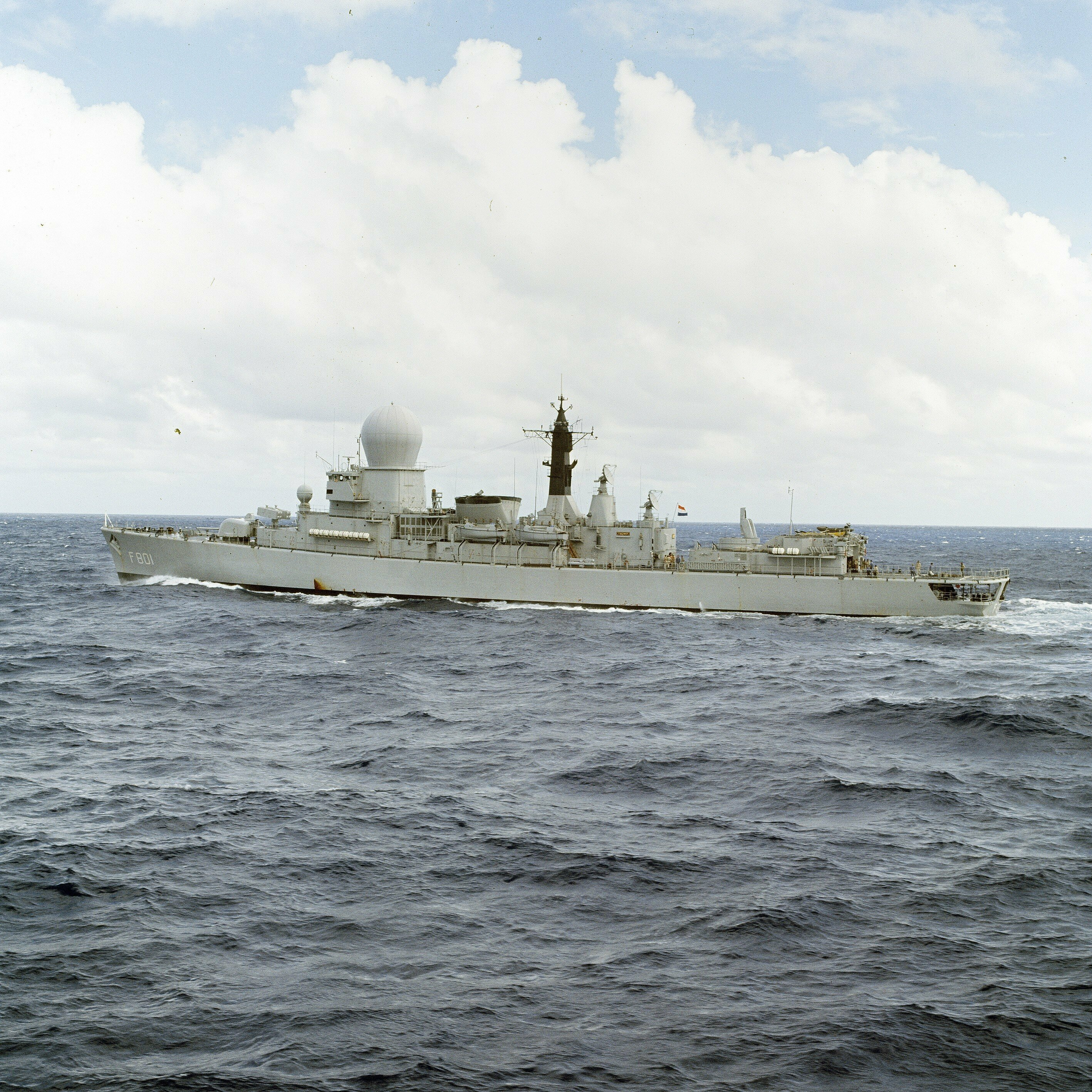
Tromp at sea; profile view

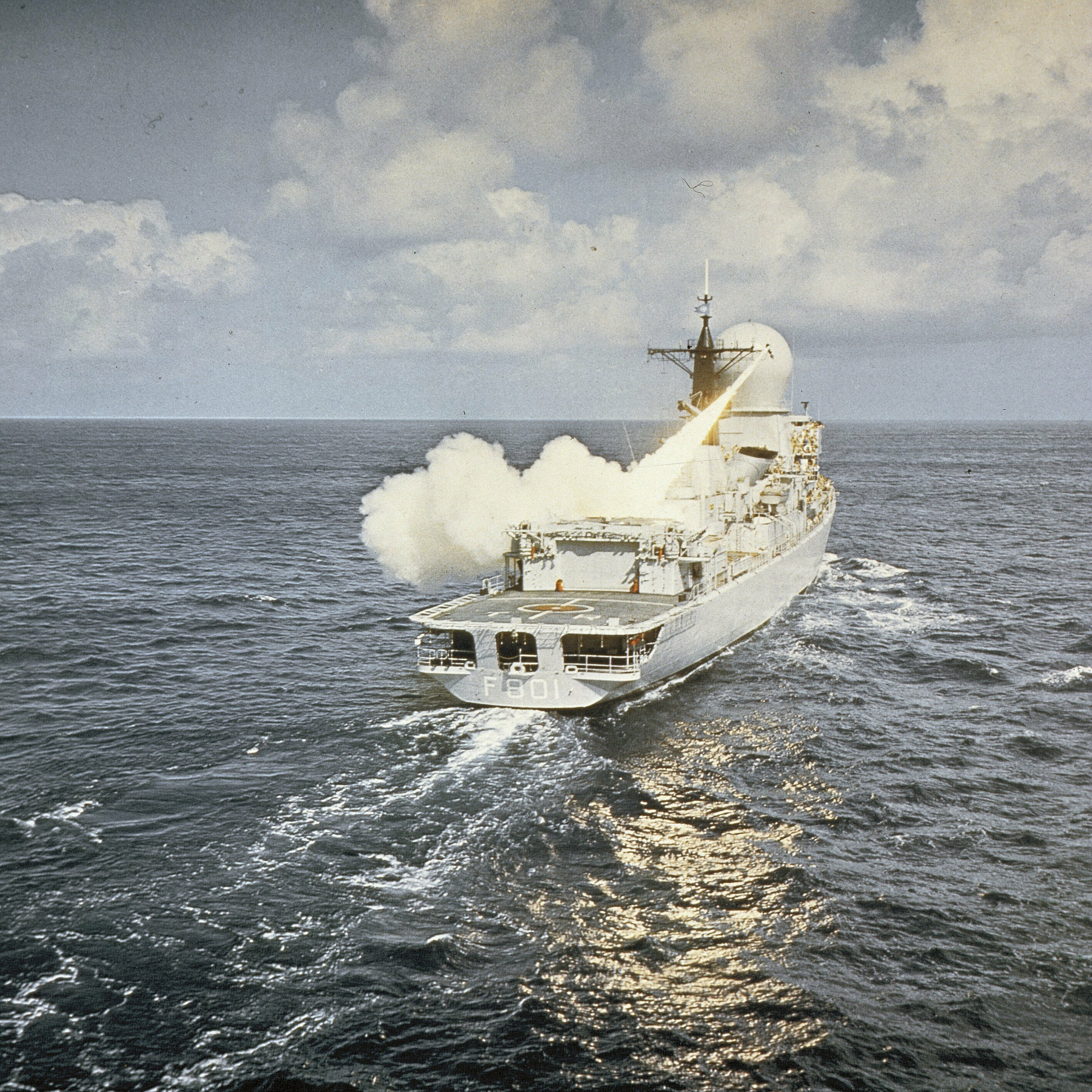
Tromp firing her Standard surface-to-air missile.

HNLMS Tromp was one of two Tromp-class frigates and was built at the KM de Schelde in Vlissingen. The keel laying took place on 4 August 1971 and the launching on 3 June 1973. The ship was put into service on 3 October 1975.

In July 1976 Tromp, together with the frigates Van Nes, Van Galen, the destroyers Holland, Zeeland, the submarine Dolfijn and the replenishment ship Poolster visited New York in commemoration of the city's 200 years anniversary.

On 12 March 1979 she and the frigate Kortenaer, the destroyer Drenthe and the replenishment ship Poolster departed for a trip to the Far East to show the flag.

The ship was part of NATO STANAVFORLANT '86 for which it was sent to North America. During the trip a fire broke out in the engine room. In 1986 the future King of the Netherlands Willem-Alexander would also serve aboard the ship.

8 February 1982 the ship together with the frigates Callenburgh, Van Speijk, Piet Hein, the destroyer Overijssel and replenishment ship Zuiderkruis departed from Den Helder for a trip to the US to show the flag and for 200 years diplomatic relations. The ships returned to Den Helder on 19 May 1982.

In 1996 she made a trip to Norway with the frigates Jacob van Heemskerck, Willem van der Zaan, Bloys van Treslong and the replenishment ship Amsterdam.

In 1999 the vessel was decommissioned and later scrapped.
