= Greek ship Navarinon =

At least three ships of the Hellenic Navy have borne the name Navarinon :

- Greek destroyer Navarinon (1944) was an E-class destroyer, launched as HMS Echo in 1934 and renamed on transfer to Greece in 1944. She was returned to the Royal Navy in 1956 and scrapped.
- Greek destroyer Navarinon (D63), a Fletcher-class destroyer launched in 1943 as USS Brown she was transferred to Greece in 1962 and renamed. She was scrapped in 1981.
- Greek frigate Navarinon (F-461), an Elli-class frigate launched in 1977 as HNLMS Van Kinsbergen she was transferred to Greece in 1995 and renamed.
