= HNLMS Wambrau =

Tugboat of the Royal Netherlands Navy

History

Netherlands
- Name: Wambrau (Note: Wambrau means strong wind.)
- Operator: Royal Netherlands Navy
- Builder: Rijkswerf Willemsoord, Den Helder
- Laid down: 24 July 1956
- Launched: 27 August 1956
- Commissioned: 8 January 1957
- Decommissioned: 15 April 1987

General characteristics
- Type: Tugboat
- Displacement: 179 t (176 long tons)
- Length: 26.38 m (86 ft 7 in)
- Beam: 6.60 m (21 ft 8 in)
- Draught: 2.45 m (8 ft 0 in)
- Propulsion: 1 propeller; 500 hp (370 kW); 1 x 8 cylinder Werkspoor diesel engine
- Speed: 10.8 knots (20.0 km/h; 12.4 mph)
- Crew: 9
- Armament: 2 x 20 mm machine guns

HNLMS Wambrau (A871) was a tugboat of the Royal Netherlands Navy (RNN). She served in the RNN between 1957 and 1987.

== Construction ==
Wambrau was laid down on 24 July 1956 and launched on 27 August 1956 at the Rijkswerf in Den Helder. The next year on 8 January 1957, she was commissioned into the Royal Netherlands Navy.

== Service history ==
In 1965 the HNLMS Holland collided with a freighter at sea and sustained severe damage, in response the Wambrau sailed immediately to the Holland to help with towing the destroyer back to Den Helder.
