= HNLMS Van Kinsbergen (F809) =

Frigate of the Royal Netherlands Navy

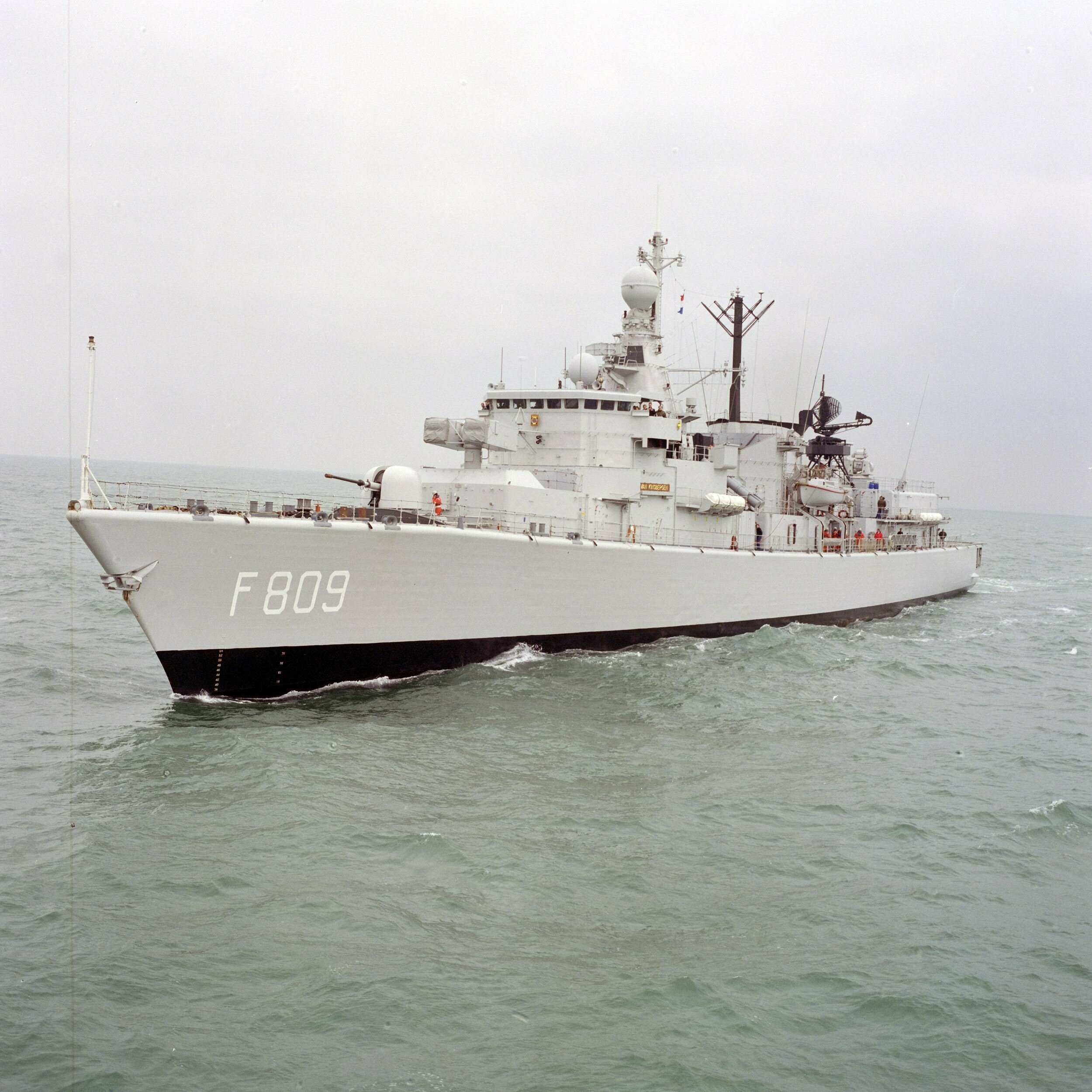
- Van Kinsbergen in 1990

History

Netherlands
- Name: Van Kinsbergen
- Namesake: Jan Hendrik van Kinsbergen
- Ordered: 1974
- Builder: KM de Schelde, Vlissingen
- Laid down: 2 September 1975
- Launched: 16 April 1977
- Commissioned: 24 April 1980
- Decommissioned: 1995
- Identification: Pennant number F 809
- Fate: Sold to the Hellenic Navy, 1995

Greece
- Name: Navarinon
- Acquired: 1995
- Commissioned: 1 March 1995
- Identification: F 461
- Status: active service

General characteristics
- Class & type: Kortenaer-class frigate
- Displacement: 3,500 long tons (3,600 t) standard; 3,800 long tons (3,900 t) full load
- Length: 130 m (426 ft 6 in)
- Beam: 14.4 m (47 ft 3 in)
- Draft: 4.4 m (14 ft 5 in)
- Propulsion: Combined gas or gas (COGOG) system: 2 × Rolls-Royce Tyne RM1C gas turbines, 4,900 shp (3,700 kW) each; 2 × Rolls-Royce Olympus TM3B gas turbines, 25,700 shp (19,200 kW) each (boost); 2 shafts
- Speed: 20 knots (37 km/h; 23 mph) cruise; 30 knots (56 km/h; 35 mph) maximum
- Endurance: 4,700 nautical miles at 16 knots (8,700 km at 30 km/h)
- Complement: 176–196
- Armament: 2 × OTO-Melara Compatto 76 mm/62 cal. gun; 2 × twin Mk46 torpedo tubes; 2 × quad RGM-84 Harpoon anti-ship missile launchers; 1 × 8-cell Sea Sparrow anti-aircraft missile launchers; 1 × Goalkeeper in Dutch service; 1 × Phalanx in Greek service
- Aircraft carried: 2 × Sea Lynx helicopters (1 in peacetime)

HNLMS Van Kinsbergen (F809) (Dutch: Hr.Ms. Van Kinsbergen) was a frigate of the Kortenaer class. The ship was in service with the Royal Netherlands Navy from 1980 to 1995. She was named after Dutch naval hero Jan Hendrik van Kinsbergen.

== Design and construction ==
In the early 1970s, the Royal Netherlands Navy developed a 'Standard' frigate design to replace the destroyers of the Holland- and Friesland-classes. The 'Standard' design would have anti-submarine (the Kortenaer class) and anti-aircraft (the Jacob van Heemskerck-class) variants with different armaments on a common hull design. The first eight Kortenaers were ordered in 1974, with four more ordered in 1976, although two were sold to Greece while being built, and replaced by two of the anti-aircraft variant.

The Kortenaer's were 130.2 metres (427 ft 2 in) long overall and 121.8 metres (400 ft) between perpendiculars, with a beam) of 14.4 metres (47 ft 3 in) and a draft of 4.4 metres (14 ft 5 in) (and 6.0 metres (19 ft 8 in) at the propellers). Displacement was 3,000 long tons (3,050 t) standard and 3,785 long tons (3,846 t) full load. The ship was powered by two 25,800 shaft horsepower (19,200 kW) Rolls-Royce Olympus TM 3B and two 4,900 shaft horsepower (3,700 kW) Rolls-Royce Tyne TM 1C gas turbines in a combined gas or gas (COGOG) arrangement, driving two propeller shafts. The Olympus engines gave a speed of 30 knots (35 mph; 56 km/h), and the Tyne cruise engines gave a speed of 20 knots (23 mph; 37 km/h).

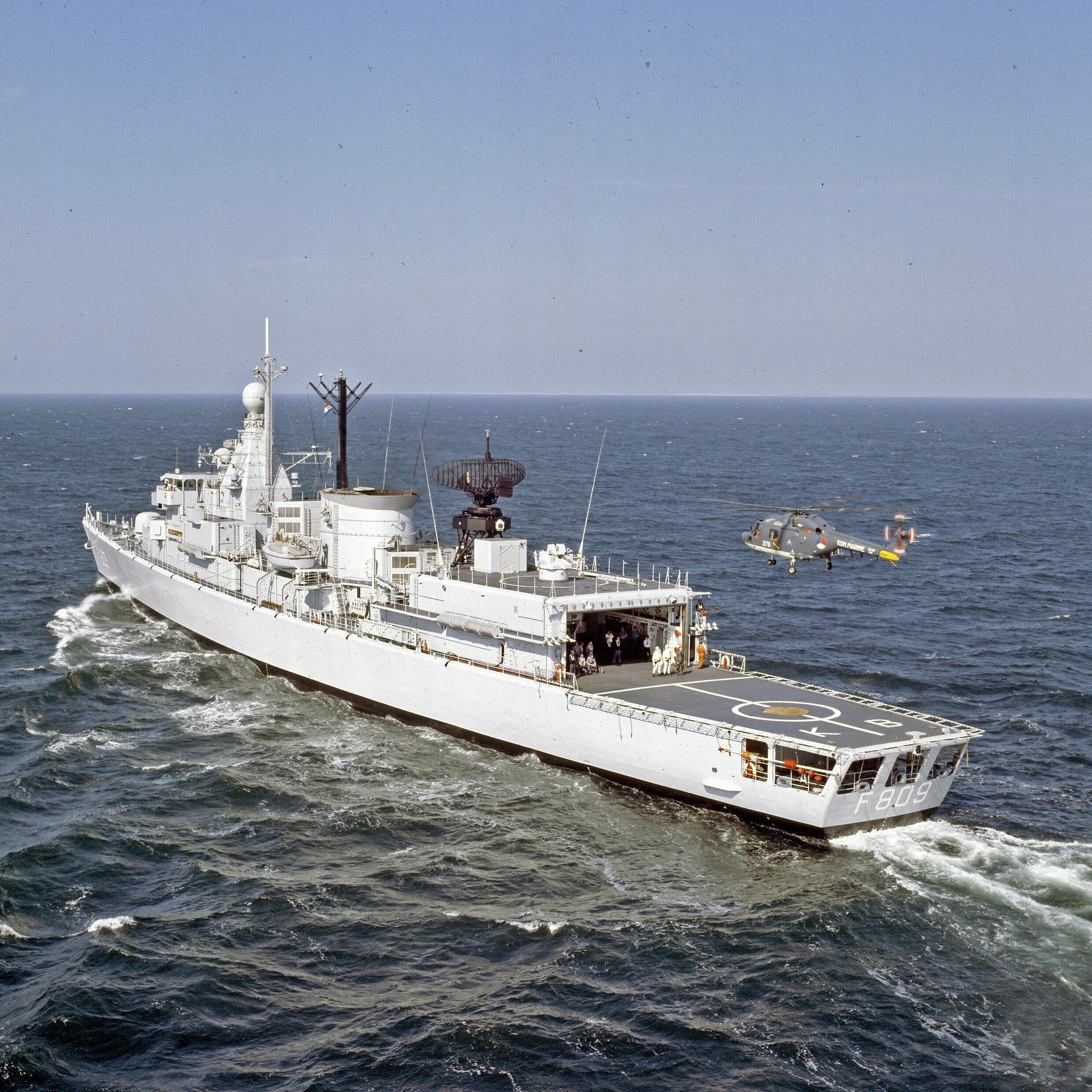
A Westland Lynx approaches the flight deck of Van Kinsbergen

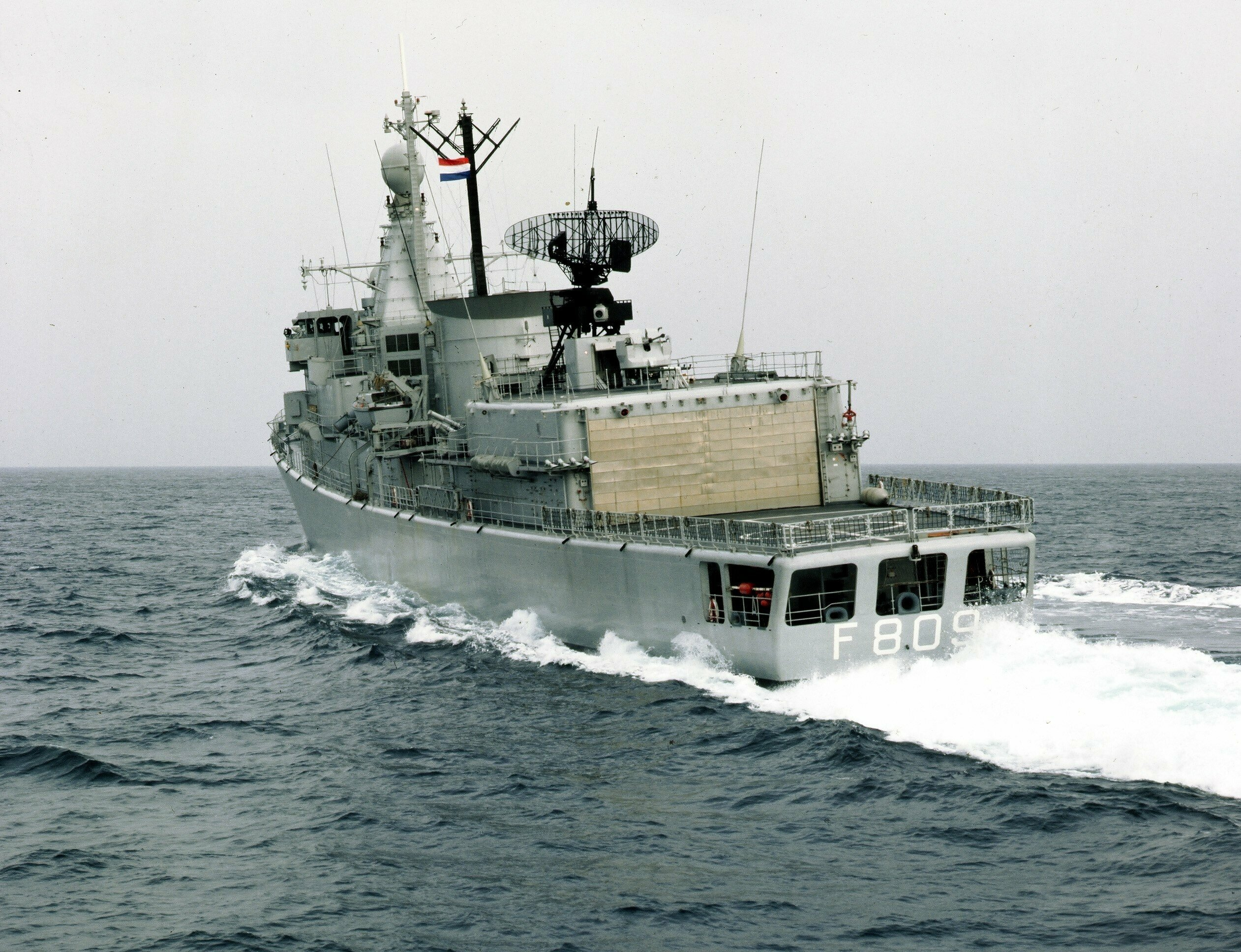
Van Kinsbergen manoeuvring dynamically; aft view with hangar and armament.

Van Kinsbergen's main anti-aircraft armament was an 8-round NATO Sea Sparrow surface-to-air missile launcher in front of the bridge. An OTO Melara 76 mm was fitted forward of the Sea Sparrow launcher, while a Goalkeeper CIWS was planned to be fitted aft, on the roof of the ship's hangar. Goalkeeper was not available when the ships were built, however, and Van Kinsbergen was completed with a Bofors 40 mm L/60 anti-aircraft gun in its place. Eight Harpoon anti-ship missiles could be carried in two quadruple launchers, although two or four Harpoons was a more normal peacetime load-out. A hangar and fight deck were fitted to accommodate two Westland Lynx helicopters, although only one was normally carried. Close-in anti submarine armament was provided by four 324 mm tubes for US Mark 46 torpedoes. A Signaal LW-08 long-range air search radar was fitted, together with a ZW-06 surface-search radar, with WM-25 and STIR-180 fire control radars to direct the ship's armament. A Canadian SQS-505 hull-mounted sonar was fitted.

Van Kinsbergen's Bofors was replaced by the intended Goalkeeper by 1995. On transfer to Greece, the Goalkeeper was removed. Greece replaced it by an American Phalanx CIWS, while Agusta-Bell AB 212 helicopters replaced the Lynxes.

HNLMS Van Kinsbergen was laid down at the Koninklijke Maatschappij De Schelde (KM de Schelde) shipyard in Vlissingen on 2 September 1975. She was launched on 16 April 1977 and commissioned into service on 24 April 1980 with the Pennant number F 809. The ship's radio call sign was "PADC".

== Dutch service history ==
Van Kinsbergen and the frigates De Ruyter, Callenburgh, Jan van Brakel, and the replenishment ship Poolster departed from Den Helder on 13 January 1986 for a trip to the Far East to show the flag and promote Dutch trade. The ships returned on 19 June.

In 1995, the vessel was transferred to the Hellenic Navy.

== Greek service history ==
The ship was commissioned into the Hellenic Navy on 1 March 1995, with the new name Navarinon and the pennant number F 461.

On 28 December 2014, the ship participated in a rescue mission to assist MS Norman Atlantic after it caught fire.
