= HNLMS Zeeland (D809) =

Ship

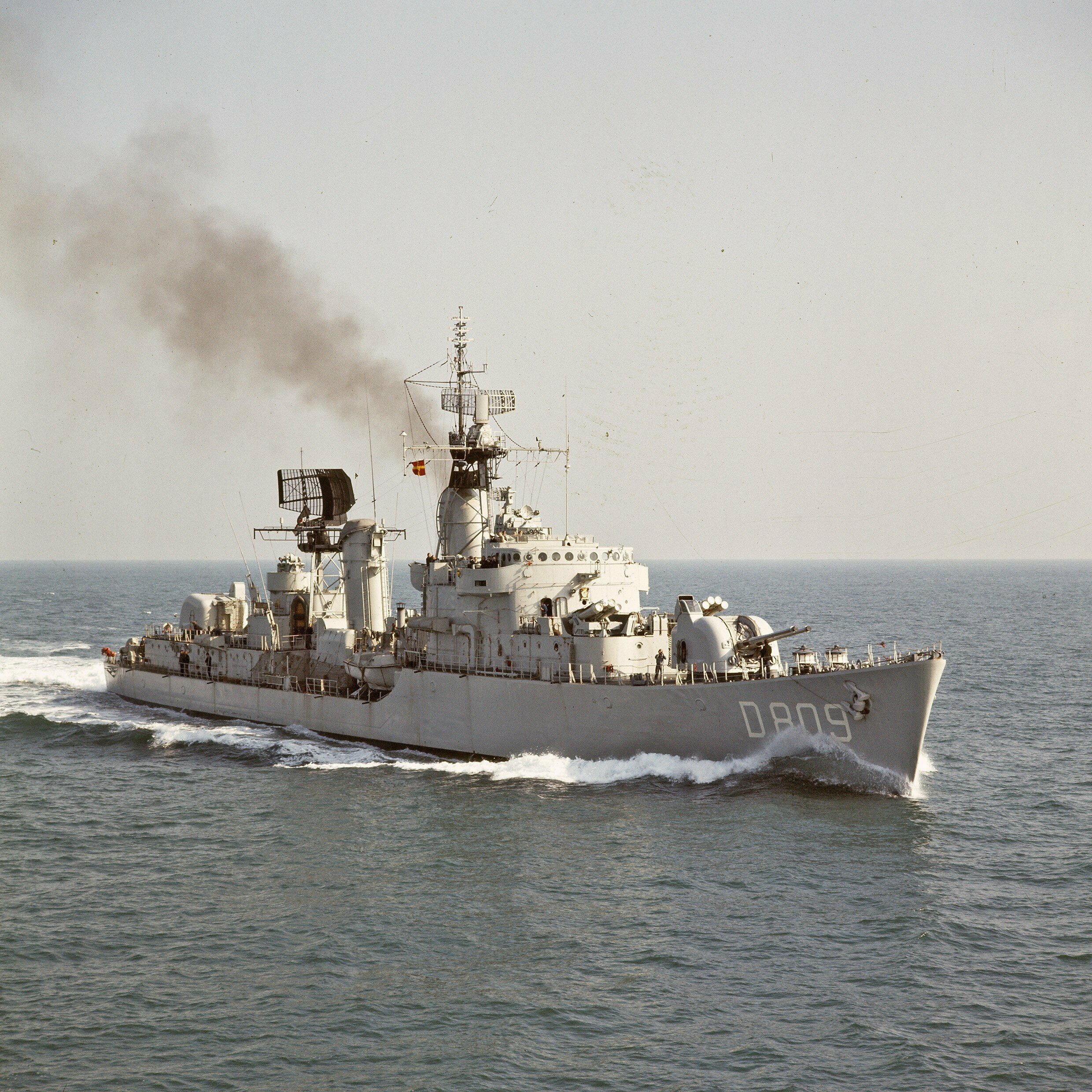
- Zeeland (D809)

History

Netherlands
- Name: Zeeland
- Namesake: Zeeland
- Ordered: 2 January 1948
- Builder: Koninklijke Maatschappij de Schelde
- Laid down: 12 January 1951
- Launched: 27 June 1953
- Commissioned: 1 March 1955
- Decommissioned: 29 September 1979
- Fate: Sold for scrap 8 November 1979

General characteristics
- Type: Holland-class destroyer
- Displacement: 2,150 long tons (2,185 t) standard; 2,600 long tons (2,642 t) full load
- Length: 113.1 m (371 ft 1 in)
- Beam: 11.4 m (37 ft 5 in)
- Draught: 5.1 m (16 ft 9 in)
- Propulsion: 2 shaft geared turbines, 2 boilers, 45,000 hp (33,556 kW)
- Speed: 32 knots (37 mph; 59 km/h)
- Range: 4,000 nmi (7,400 km) at 18 kn (33 km/h)
- Complement: 247
- Armament: 4 × Bofors 120 mm guns (2 × 2); 1 × 40 mm Bofors AA gun; 8 × 375 mm anti submarine mortars (2 × 4); 2 × depth charge racks

HNLMS Zeeland (D809) (Dutch: Hr.Ms. Zeeland) was a destroyer of the Holland class. The ship was in service with the Royal Netherlands Navy from 1955 to 1979. The destroyer was named after the Dutch province of Zeeland and was the twenty-first ship with this name. In 1978 the ship was taken out of service and later broken up and scrapped. The ship's radio call sign was "PAAU".

== History ==
HNLMS Zeeland was one of four Holland-class destroyers and was built at the Koninklijke Maatschappij de Schelde (KMS) in Vlissingen. The keel laying took place on 12 January 1951 and the launching on 27 June 1953. The ship was put into service on 1 March 1955.

Portsmouth was visited after making a trip to the North Sea and English Channel in 1955. In 1956 she would participate in the NATO exercises Grande Chase and Cut Lose.

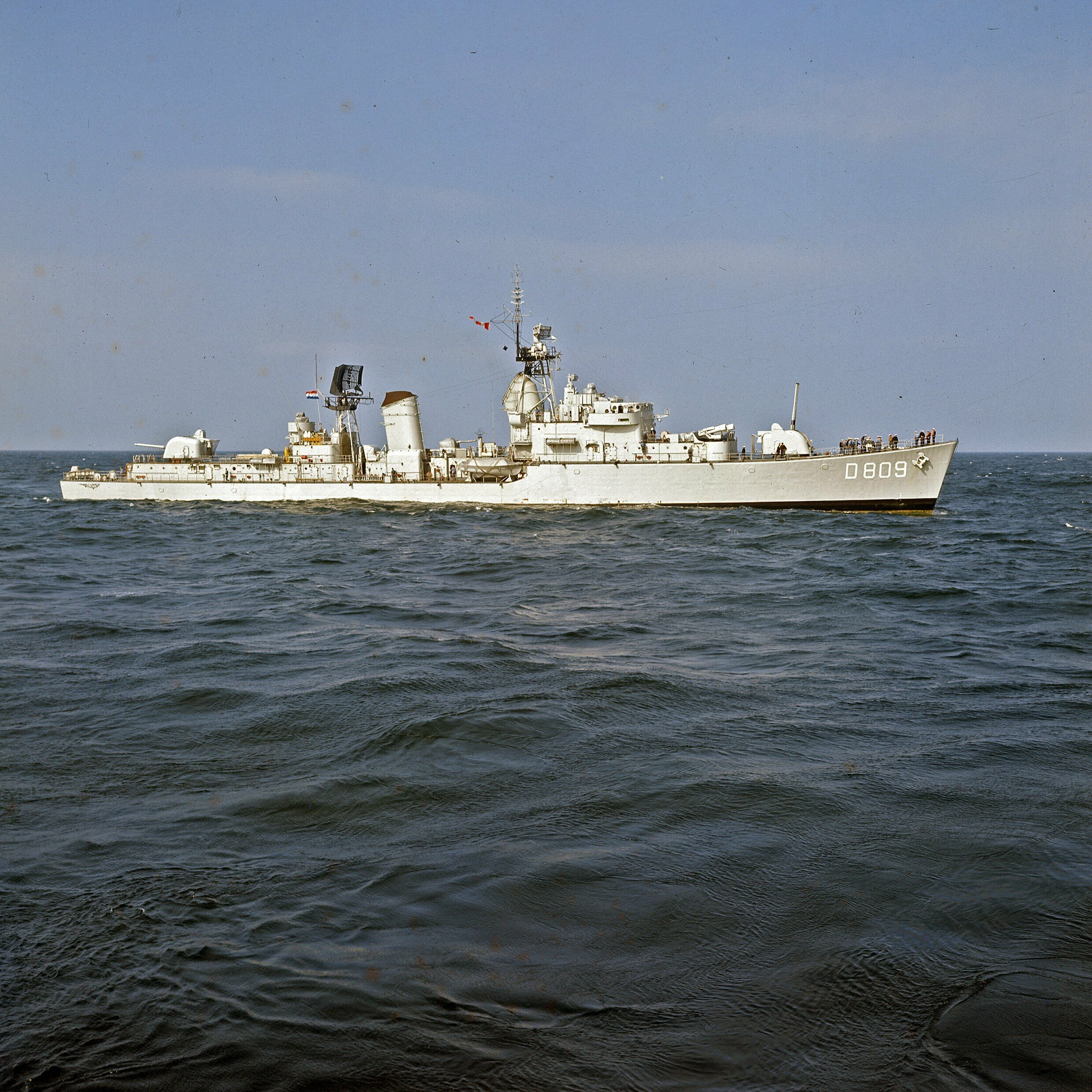
Zeeland, starboard view

In July 1956 Zeeland, the destroyer Friesland and the cruiser De Zeven Provinciën visited Leningrad for the first time since 1914. Where they were officially welcomed at the harbor of Kronstadt by the Soviet authorities.

The ship was kept in reserve and laid up from 1956 until 1965. She would participate in the NATO exercises Silent Rain in 1966 and Perfect Play in 1967. In 1968 she participated in the exercise Silver Tower and joined STANAVFORLANT. The next year she participated in the exercises Razor Sharp and Peace Keeper.

In 1969 she attended a naval review at Spithead together with her sisters Holland and Noord-Brabant, the cruiser De Ruyter and the frigates Van Nes and Evertsen.

In 1976 Zeeland, together with the frigates Tromp visited New York to attend a fleet review held on the Hudson river.

In July 1976 Zeeland, together with the frigates Tromp, Van Nes, Van Galen, the destroyer Holland, the submarine Dolfijn and the replenishment ship Poolster visited New York in commemoration of the city's 200 years anniversary.

On 29 September 1979 the vessel was decommissioned and struck from the register on 1 January 1979. Zeeland was sold on 8 November 1979 to the Dutch company Intershitra for scrapping.

== Sources ==
- Amstel, W.H.E. van (1991). De schepen van de Koninklijke Marine vanaf 1945. Alkmaar: De Alk. ISBN 978-9060139974.
- Brobbel, Henk (2008). Hr. Ms. Holland: de parel van het eskader. Soest: Boekscout VOF. ISBN 9789088342820.
- Gardiner, Robert; Chumbley, Stephen, eds. (1995). Conway's All the World's Fighting Ships 1947–1995. London: Conway Maritime. ISBN 978-0-85177-605-7. OCLC 247096356.
  Also published as:
  Gardiner, Robert; Chumbley, Stephen, eds. (1995). Conway's All the World's Fighting Ships 1947–1995. Annapolis, MD: Naval Institute Press. ISBN 978-1-55750-132-5. OCLC 34267261.
- Jordan, John (2016). Warship 2016. London: Conway. ISBN 1844863263.
- Mark, Chris (2005). Onderzeebootjagers van de Holland- en Friesland-klasse. Amsterdam: Stichting Vrienden van de Koninklijke Marine. ISBN 978-9051230048.
- Nooteboom, S.G. (2001). Deugdelijke Schepen: marinescheepsbouw 1945-1995. Europese Bibliotheek. ISBN 9789028826373.
