= HNLMS Noord-Brabant (D810) =

Holland-class anti-submarine destroyer of the Royal Netherlands Navy

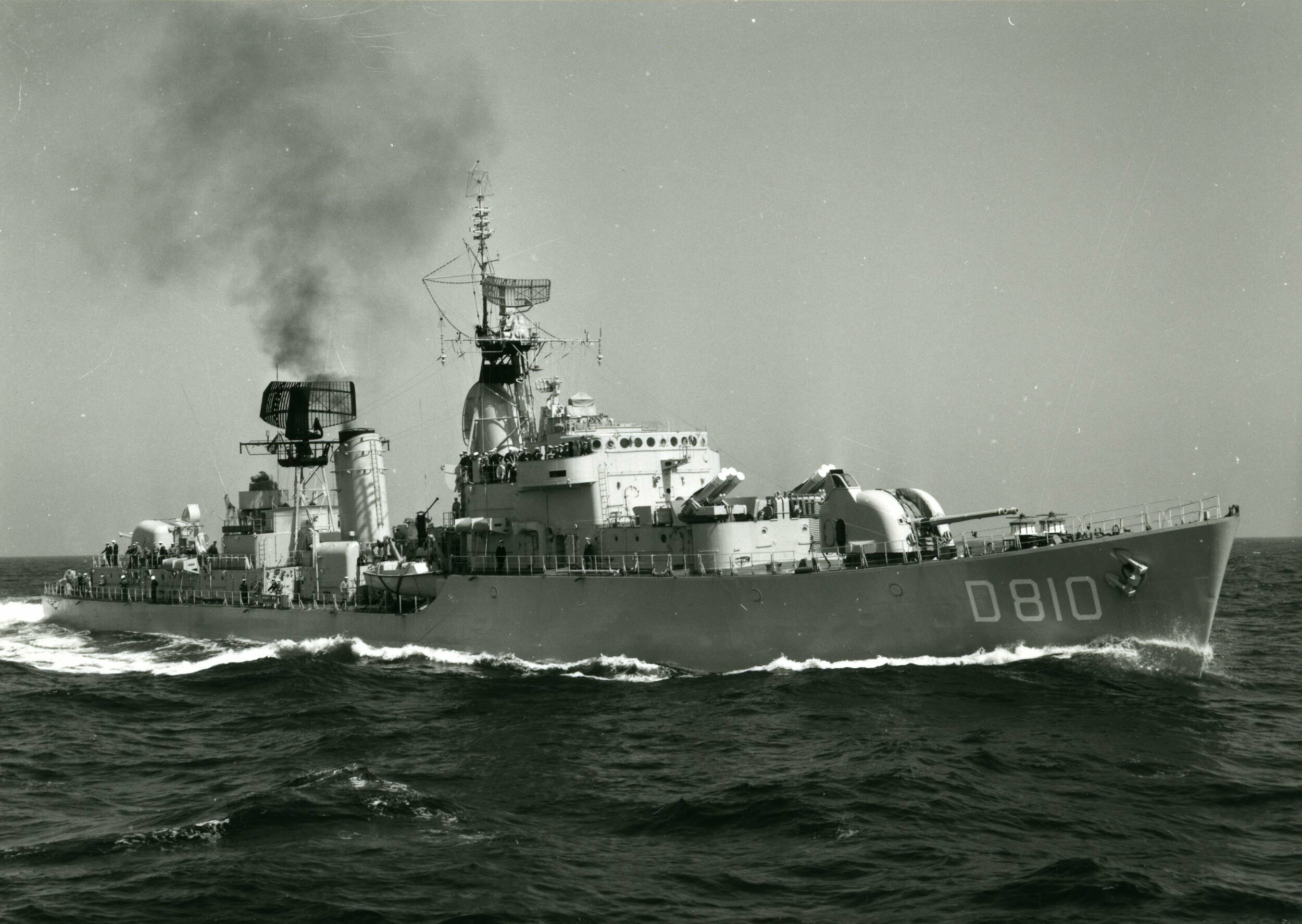
- Noord-Brabant at sea

History

Netherlands
- Name: Noord-Brabant
- Namesake: North Brabant
- Ordered: 2 January 1948
- Builder: Koninklijke Maatschappij de Schelde
- Laid down: 1 March 1951
- Launched: 28 November 1953
- Commissioned: 1 June 1955
- Fate: Decommissioned in 1974

General characteristics
- Type: Holland-class destroyer
- Displacement: 2,150 long tons (2,185 t) standard; 2,600 long tons (2,642 t) full load
- Length: 113.1 m (371 ft 1 in)
- Beam: 11.4 m (37 ft 5 in)
- Draught: 5.1 m (16 ft 9 in)
- Propulsion: 2 shaft geared turbines, 2 boilers, 45,000 hp (33,556 kW)
- Speed: 32 knots (37 mph; 59 km/h)
- Range: 4,000 nmi (7,400 km) at 18 kn (33 km/h)
- Complement: 247
- Armament: 4 × Bofors 120 mm guns (2 × 2); 1 × 40 mm Bofors AA gun; 8 × 375 mm anti submarine mortars (2 × 4); 2 × depth charge racks

HNLMS Noord-Brabant (D810) (Dutch: Hr.Ms. Noord-Brabant) was a Holland-class anti-submarine destroyer of the Royal Netherlands Navy. The ship was from 1955 to 1974 in Dutch service. On 9 January 1974, HNLMS Noord-Brabant was rammed amidships by an English merchant ship. The damage was estimated to be expensive so the Royal Netherlands Navy decided to not repair the damage but instead decommission the ship earlier than planned. The ship's radio call sign was "PAIP".

== History ==
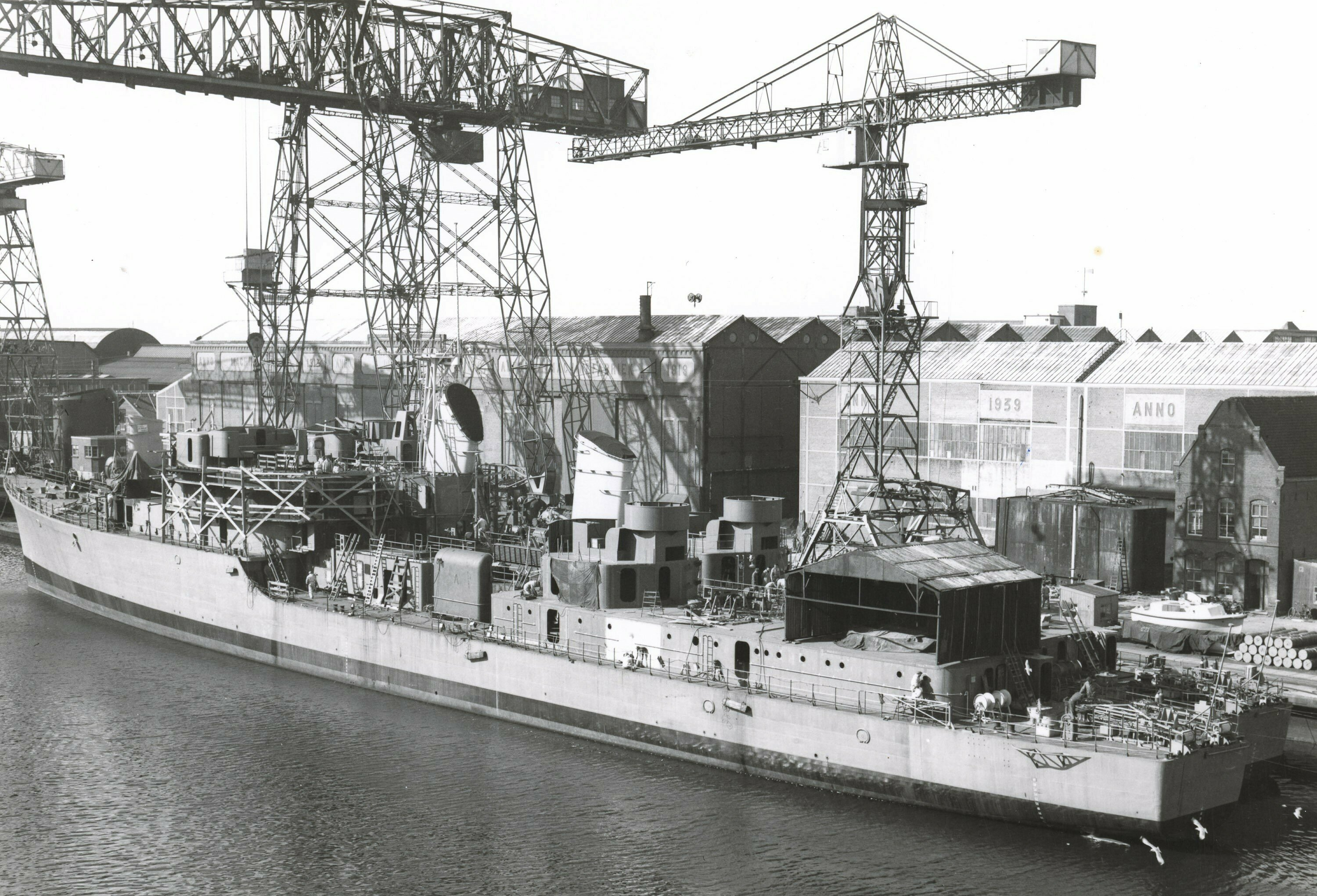
Noord-Brabant under construction in 1954.

HNLMS Noord-Brabnt was one of four Holland-class destroyers and built at the Koninklijke Maatschappij de Schelde (KMS) in Vlissingen. The keel laying took place on 1 March 1951 and the launching on 28 November 1953. The ship was put into service on 1 June 1955. The Queen's Commissioner Mr. de Quai was present on behalf of the province North Brabant at her commissioning. The first commander of HNLMS Noord-Brabant was LTZ. S. de Boer.

In 1955 she took part in the national Navy days (Vlootweek) afterwards her trials were finished and she would be placed in reserve until 1965. In 1957 Noord-Brabant was briefly taken out of reserve to participate in the festivities around the 350th anniversary of Michiel de Ruyter held at Vlissingen.

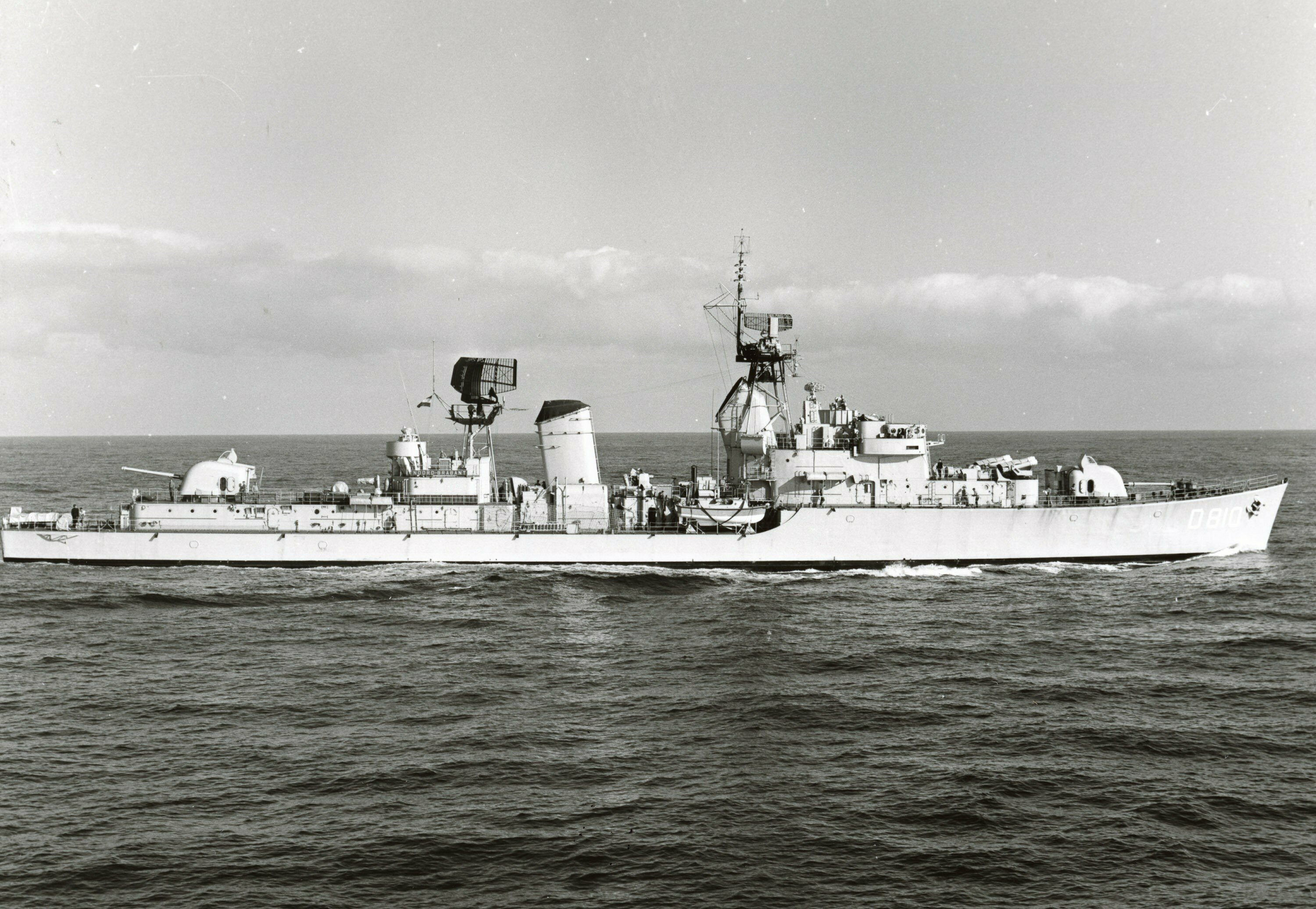
Side profile showing distribution of armament

In 1966 she would participate in the NATO exercises Sailors Pride and Silent Rain. The next year she participated in the exercises Perfect Play and Wicked Lady. In 1968 she participated in the exercise Silver Tower and a year later in an exercise called Razor Sharp.

In 1969 she attended a naval review at Spithead together with her sisters Zeeland and Holland, the cruiser De Ruyter and the frigates Van Nes and Evertsen.

Noord-Brabant participated in the exercises Strong Express in 1972 and Quick Save, Sunny Seas and Swift Move in 1973.

=== Taken out of service ===
On 9 January 1974 HNLMS Noord-Brabant was on the Westerschelde when a British bulk carrier was on course to ram the Dutch ship, the helmsman of Noord-Brabant tried his best to avoid the ramming. However, it was to no avail since the bulk carrier rammed the ship in the middle section which resulted in a 3.5-metre (11 ft) gap. In the collision two crew members of Noord-Brabant were killed and there were numerous wounded. The destroyer was towed to the ship repair yard Scheldepoort were the damage was deemed to be expensive and the Royal Netherlands Navy deemed it better to decommission the ship early than pay for the repairs. As a result, Noord Brabant was taken out of service early on 8 March 1974.
