= HNLMS Friesland (D812) =

Royal Netherlands Navy vessel

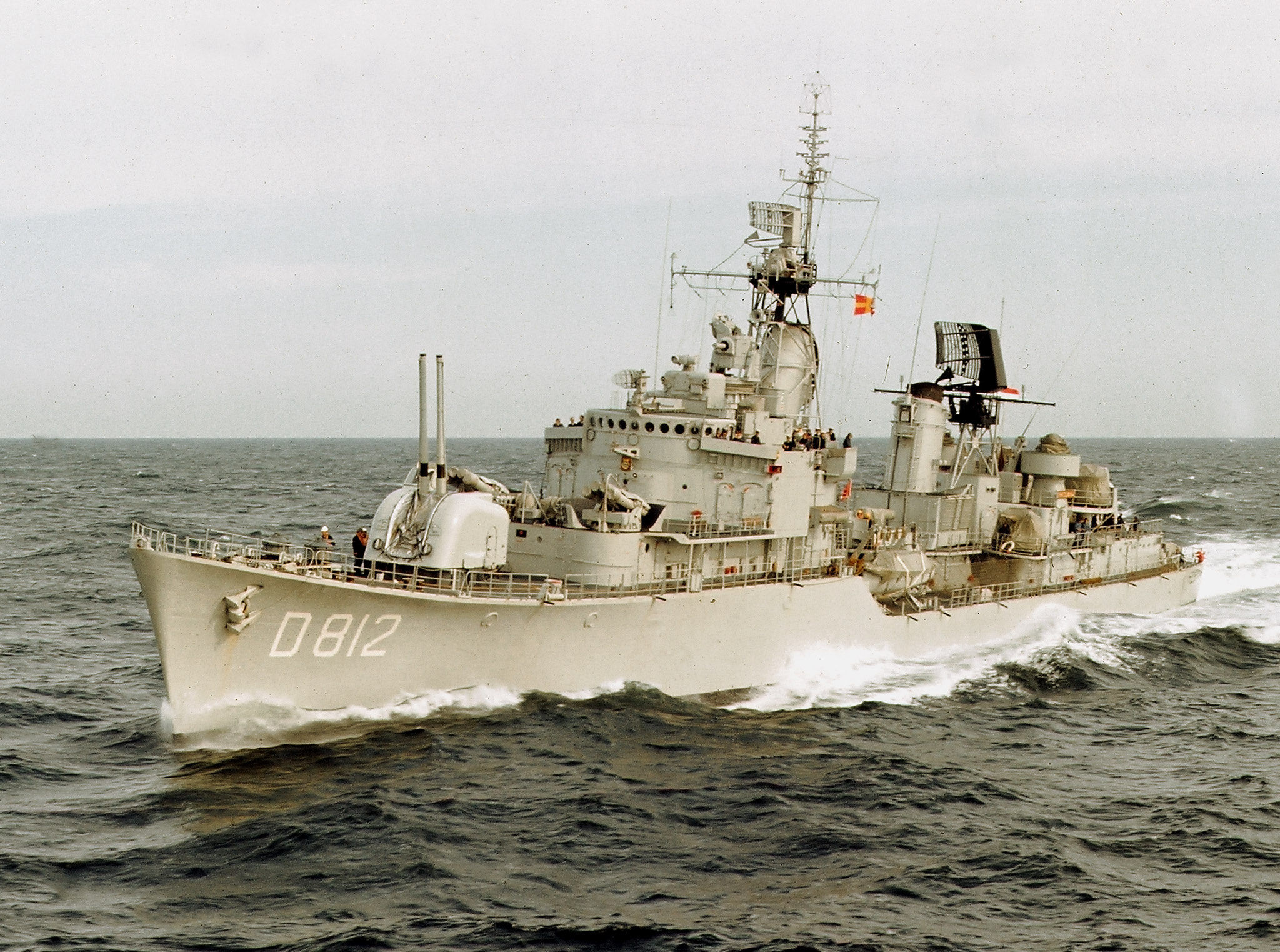

History

Netherlands
- Name: Friesland
- Namesake: Friesland
- Builder: NDSM, Amsterdam
- Laid down: 17 December 1951
- Launched: 21 February 1953
- Commissioned: 22 March 1956
- Decommissioned: 29 June 1979
- Fate: Broken up 1979

General characteristics
- Type: Friesland-class destroyer
- Displacement: 2497 standard, 3070 tons full load
- Length: 116 m (381 ft)
- Beam: 11.7 m (38 ft)
- Draught: 5.2 m (17 ft)
- Propulsion: 2 shaft geared turbines, 4 BW boilers, Super-heated steam @ 620psi, 60,000 hp
- Speed: 36 kn (67 km/h; 41 mph)
- Range: 4,000 nmi (7,400 km; 4,600 mi) at 18 kn (33 km/h; 21 mph)
- Complement: 284
- Sensors & processing systems: Radar LW-02, DA-01, ZW-01, M45, Sonar Type PAE 1N, Type CWE 10
- Armament: 4 × Bofors 120 mm guns (2 × 2); 6 × 40mm Bofors AA guns (6 × 1); 8 × 375 mm anti submarine mortars (2 × 4); 2 × depth charge racks

HNLMS Friesland (D812) (Dutch: Hr.Ms. Friesland) was a destroyer of the Friesland class. The ship was in service with the Royal Netherlands Navy from 1956 to 1979. The destroyer was named after the Dutch province of Friesland and was the fourteenth ship with this name. In 1979 the ship was taken out of service and later broken up. The ship's radio call sign was "PAJF".

== History ==
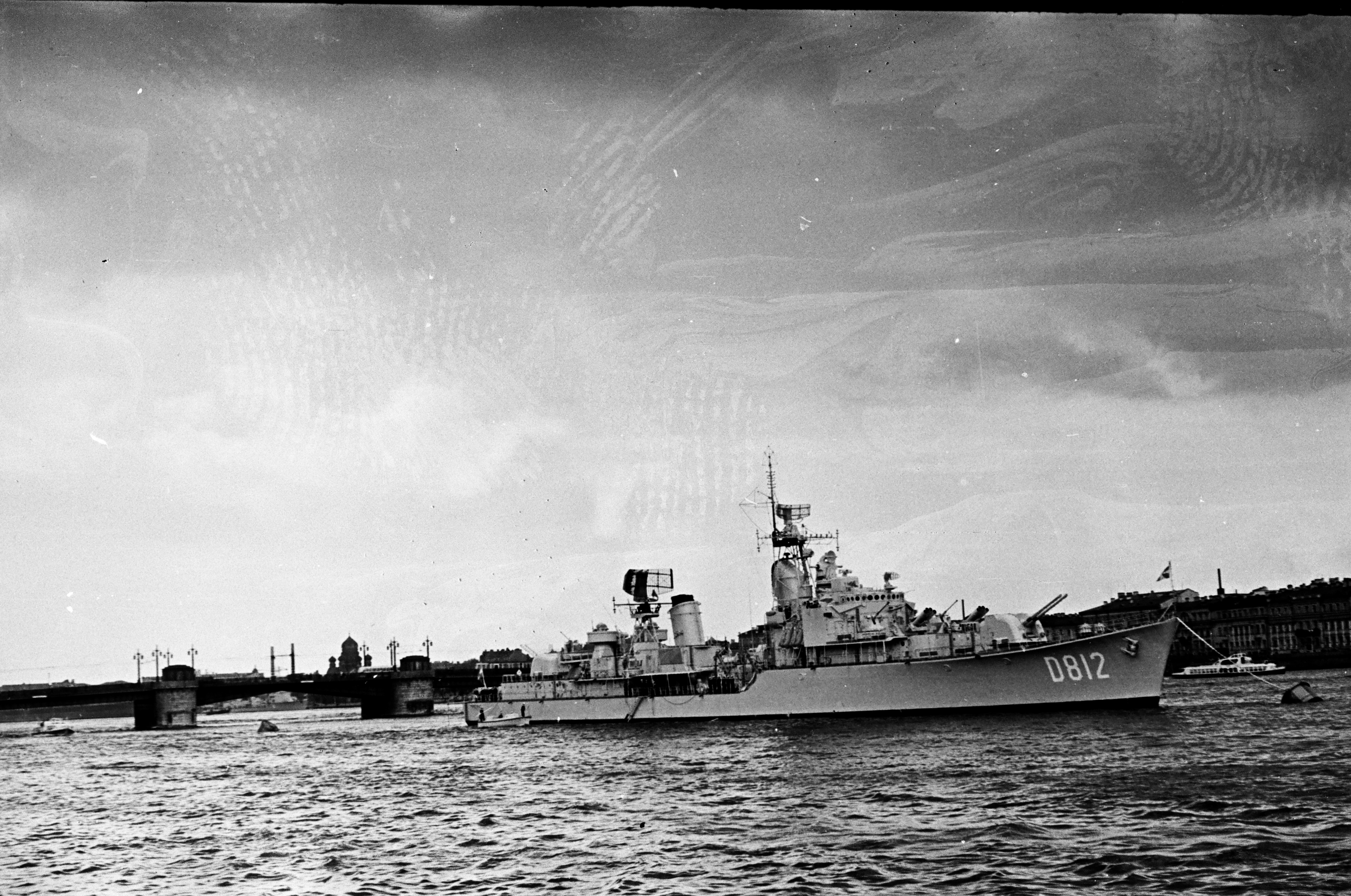
D812 in Leningrad, 1956

HNLMS Friesland was one of eight Friesland-class destroyers and was built at the NDSM in Amsterdam. The keel laying took place on 17 December 1951 and the launching on 21 February 1953. The ship was put into service on 22 March 1956.

In July 1956 Friesland, the destroyer Zeeland and the cruiser De Zeven Provinciën visited Leningrad for the first time since 1914. Where they were officially welcomed at the harbor of Kronstadt by the Soviet authorities.

In 1962 during the West New Guinea dispute Friesland thwarted an Indonesian landing on the island of Misool, at that time part of Netherlands New Guinea.

On 29 June 1979 the vessel was decommissioned and later scrapped. She was the only ship of her class not to be sold to the Peruvian Navy
