= HNLMS Holland (D808) =

1953 destroyer of the Royal Netherlands Navy

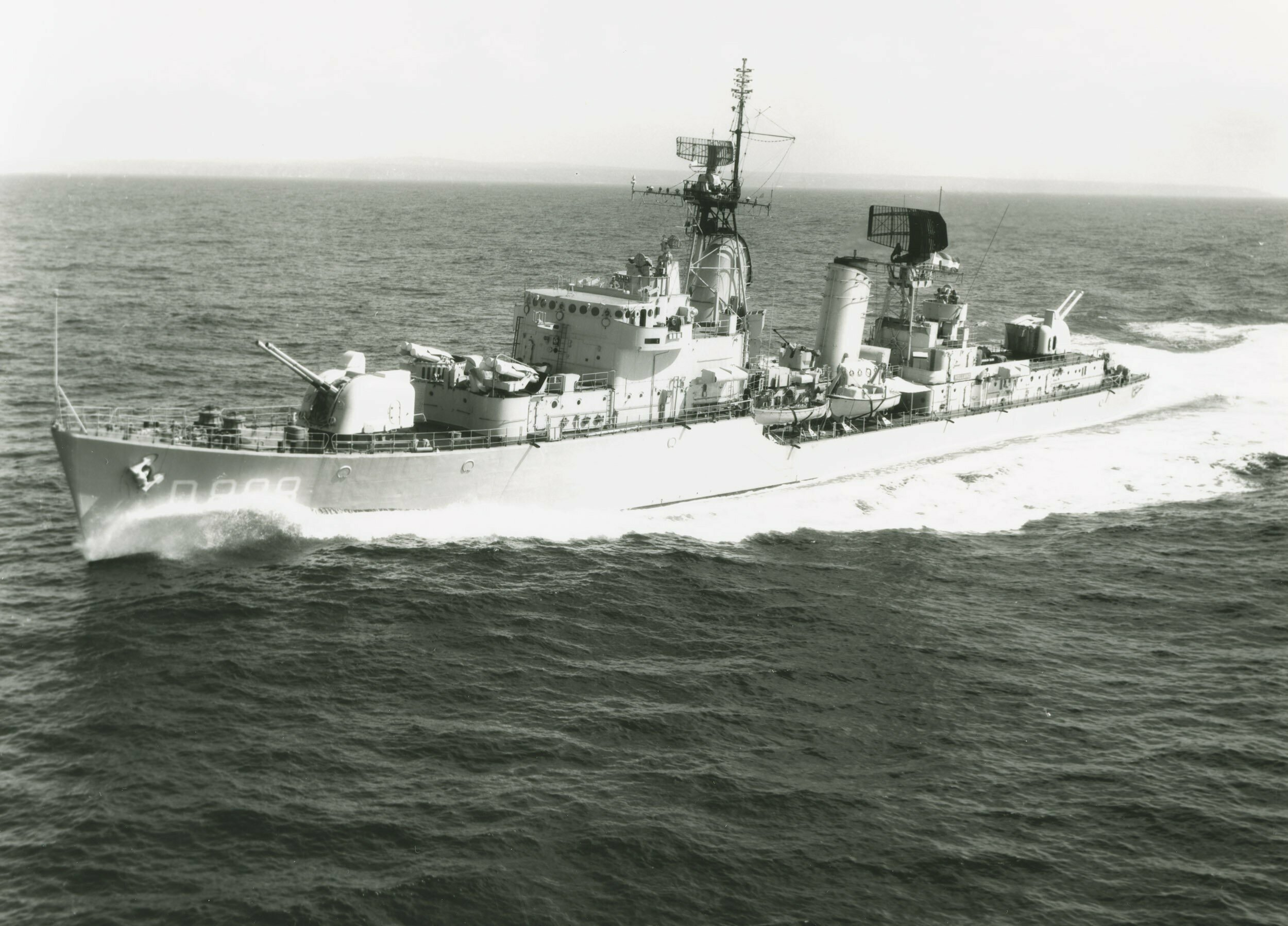
- HNLMS Holland in 1962

History

Netherlands
- Name: Holland
- Namesake: Holland
- Ordered: 2 January 1948
- Builder: Rotterdamsche Droogdok Maatschappij
- Yard number: RDM-266
- Laid down: 21 April 1950
- Launched: 11 April 1953
- Commissioned: 30 December 1954
- Fate: Sold to Peruvian Navy in 1978

Peru
- Name: Garcia y Garcia
- Acquired: 1978
- Identification: DD75
- Fate: Decommissioned 1986

General characteristics
- Type: Holland-class destroyer
- Displacement: 2,150 long tons (2,185 t) standard; 2,600 long tons (2,642 t) full load
- Length: 113.1 m (371 ft 1 in)
- Beam: 11.4 m (37 ft 5 in)
- Draught: 5.1 m (16 ft 9 in)
- Propulsion: 2 shaft geared turbines, 2 boilers, 45,000 hp (33,556 kW)
- Speed: 32 knots (37 mph; 59 km/h)
- Range: 4,000 nmi (7,400 km) at 18 kn (33 km/h)
- Complement: 247
- Armament: 4 × Bofors 120 mm guns (2 × 2); 1 × 40 mm Bofors AA gun; 8 × 375 mm anti submarine mortars (2 × 4); 2 × depth charge racks

HNLMS Holland (D808) (Dutch: Hr.Ms. Holland) was the lead ship of her class of four destroyers built for the Royal Netherlands Navy in the early 1950s. HNLMS Holland is named after a former province of the Kingdom of the Netherlands and was the twentieth ship with this name. In 1978 the ship was taken out of service and sold to Peru where it was renamed Garcia y Garcia. The ship's radio call sign was "PAOP".

== Design and description ==
The ship was completely electrically welded and assembled on the slope from sections produced in the RDM workshops. There are no portholes in the hull, so that all rooms are artificially illuminated and ventilated. The main armament consists of four 12 cm guns, arranged in two double towers, which can be used for both sea and air targets. Furthermore, there are one machine gun of 40 mm, two rocket depth bombers, two depth bomb racks and no helicopters. The crew consists of 246 heads.

== History ==
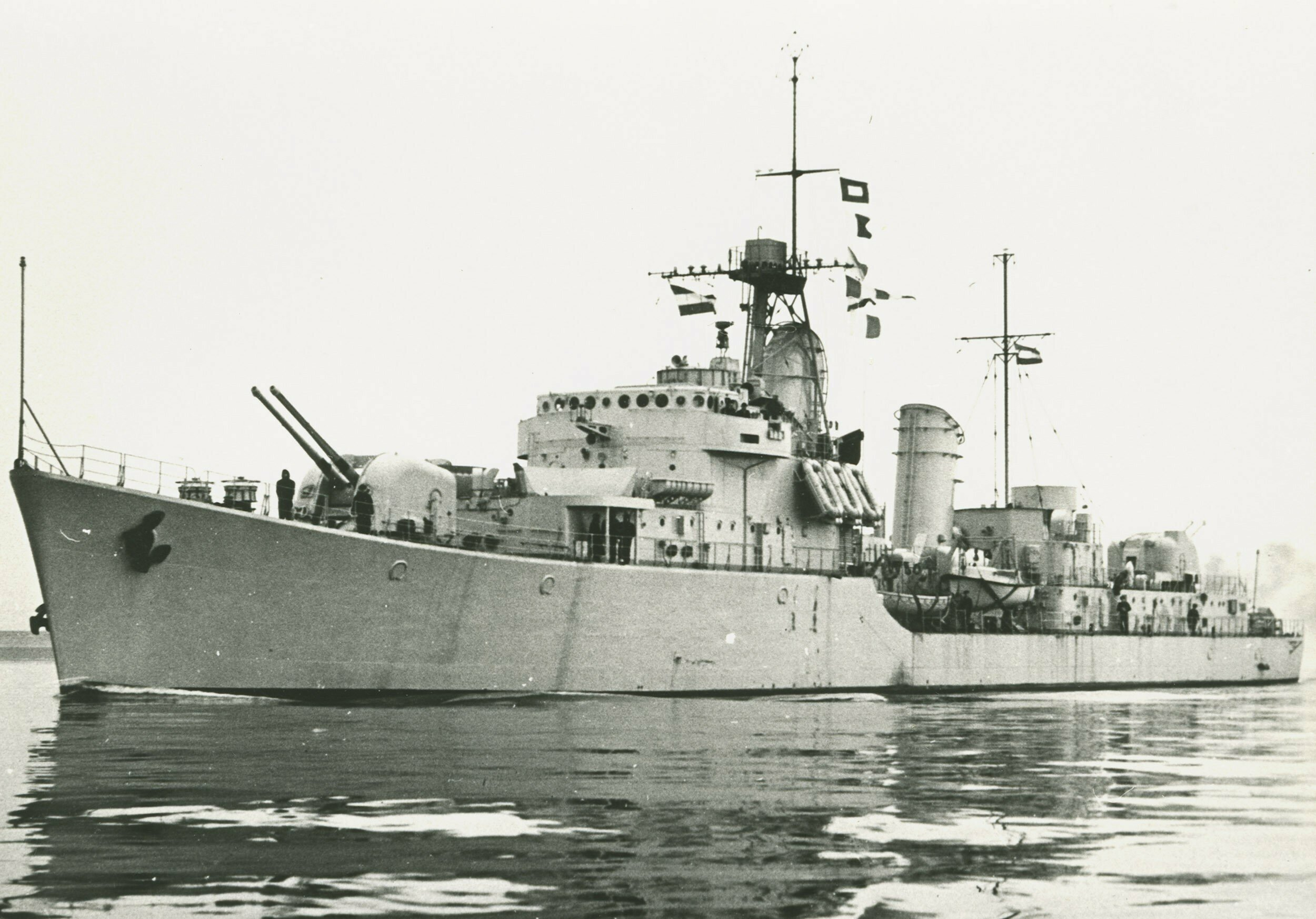
Holland in 1954

The provisional building contract for HNLMS Holland was issued on 2 January 1948. The keel was laid down on 21 April 1950 and the ship was launched on 11 April 1953. Mrs. A.J. Moorman - Wijtenburg, wife of the State Secretary for Marine, H.W.C. Moorman, performed the christening ceremony. A powerful ax hit the ship smoothly to the water. A large number of invitees, including senior navy authorities, including from the United States, England and Canada, witnessed this. Between 16 and 19 January 1954 the sea trials took place, while the official test tours began on 2 March 1954 in Den Helder and lasted until 15 April 1954.

The "great test trip" - as the RDM called it - took more than six weeks and made HNLMS Holland visit several locations. It began on 2 March 1954 when Holland sailed via Den Helder to Scotland for a week full of speed trials. On the way there the sea was rough and according to the staff magazine of the Rotterdam yard "many promptly made the famous sacrifice". In order to measure the exact speed, speed tests were carried out on the island of Arran, because the nautical mile was precisely measured and visualized on the basis of markings on land. After some tourist trips in Scotland, ship, shipyard personnel and crew set sail once again for the south to test the ventilation systems. After Holland had left Scotland, it was again in a storm. The speed had to be limited to 4 to 5 knots, while life on board was seriously hindered because the ship made large swings.

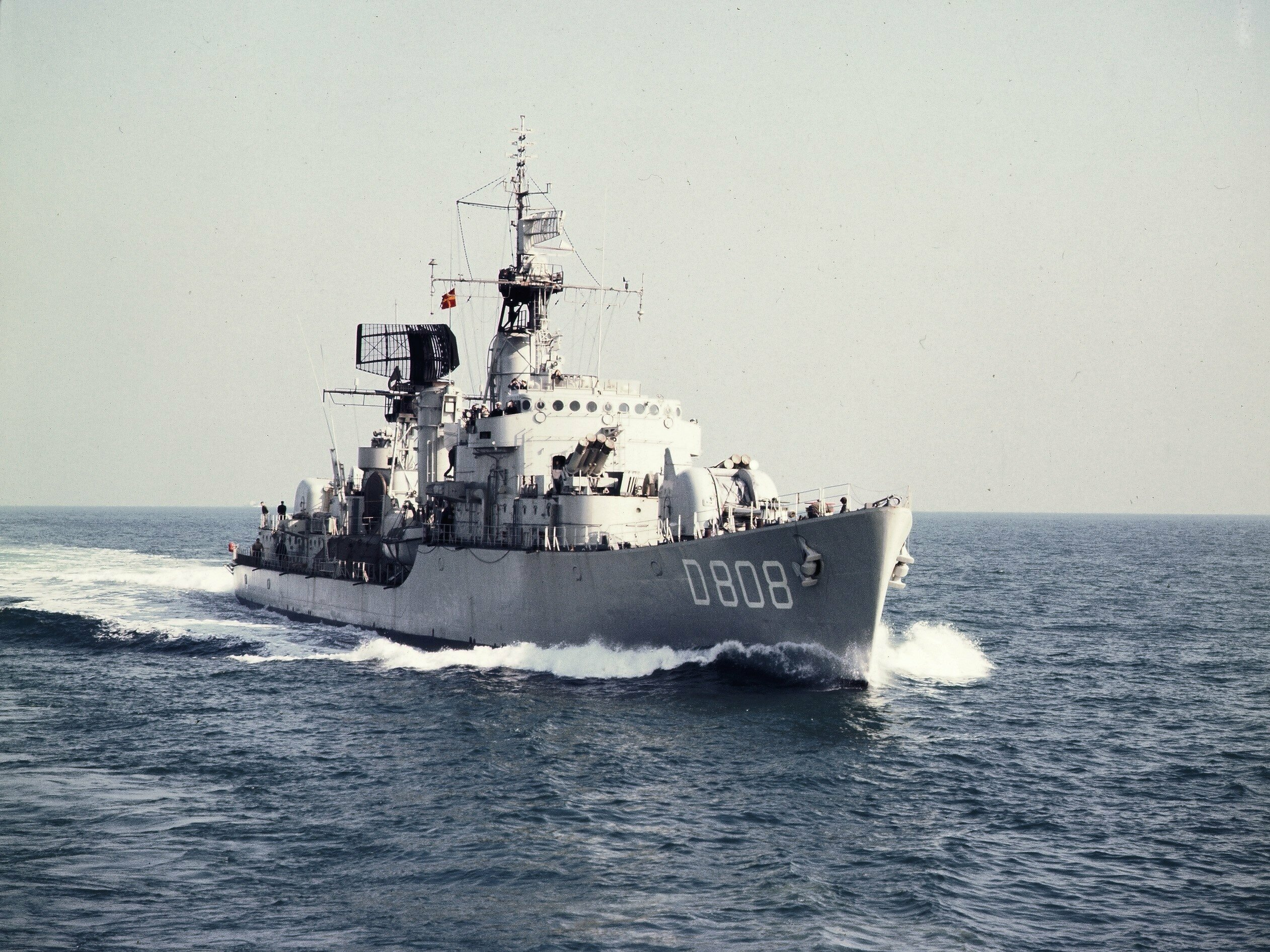
Holland at sea, date unknown.

As Las Palmas was approached, the thick coats were exchanged by deck chairs. Then Holland steamed up to Dakar (Senegal) where again several tests were done. During these tests the destroyer was only docked for a short time. On the way to Casablanca (Morocco), the surging turned out to be too much for the new naval ship to keep pace. After three hours in Casablanca the sea was chosen again, this time to the north. At the height of Portugal, Holland was placed transversely to the waves for pendulum tests. Three days later it was back in Den Helder where it was subjected to tests at the Rijkswerf. On 15 April Holland moored again at the RDM in Rotterdam. In addition to speed and ventilation, issues such as sailing behavior, controllability, operation of the equipment and housing were also examined. After these tests, HNLMS Holland was put into service on 30 December 1954 and was the twentieth ship in the Royal Netherlands Navy at the time.

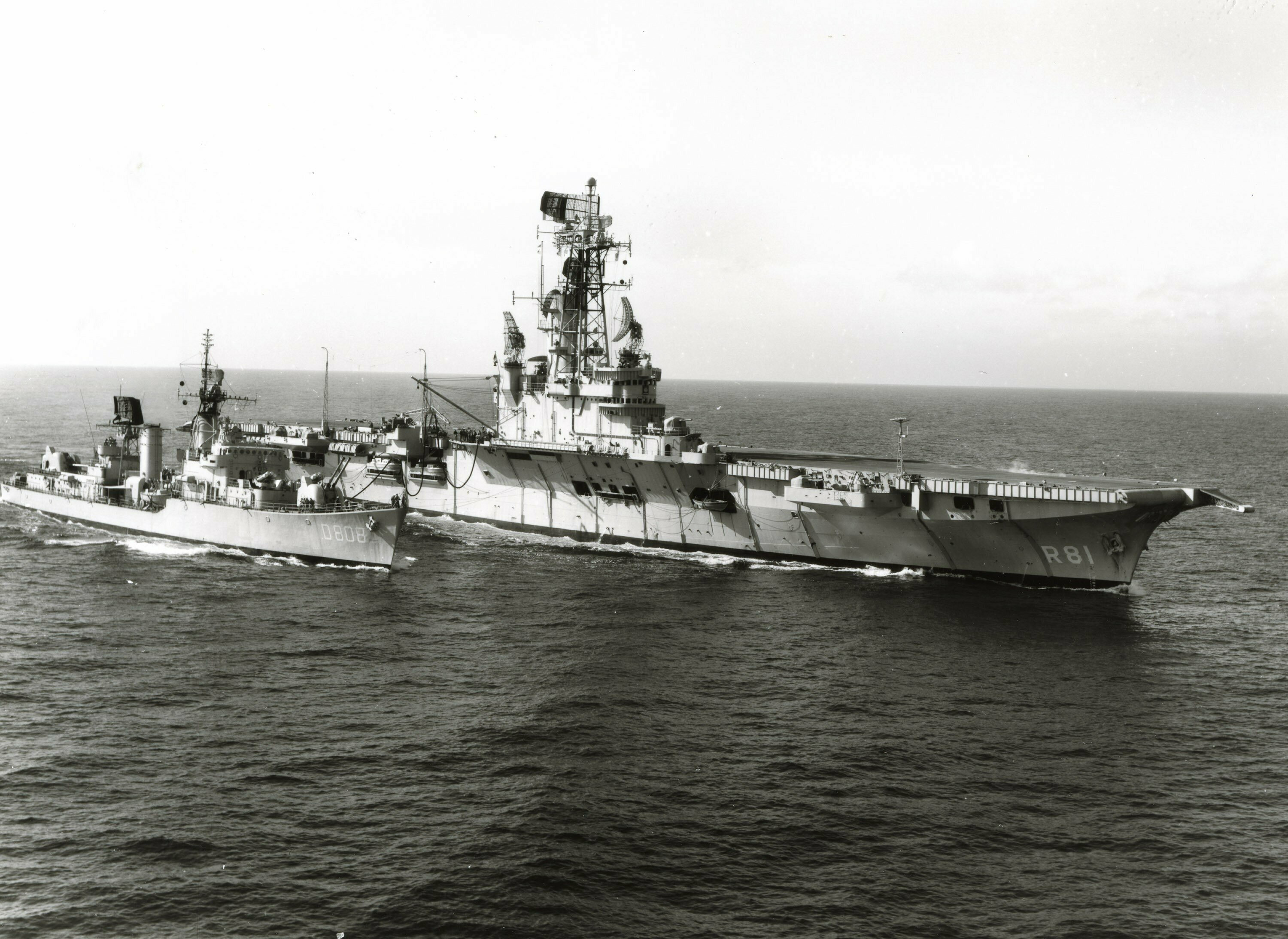
Holland alongside aircraft carrier Karel Doorman in 1960.

In 1955 Holland circumvented Africa steaming through the Suez Canal to Cape town. Upon return the ship was kept in reserve and laid up from 1955 until 1962. The ship collided in 1965 with the Danish ship MV Mayumba of Texel. 13 January 1968 the ship joint NATO STANAVFORLANT at Portland. In June 1967 a courtesy visit to Chatham, with costumed Regiment de Marine re-enactors on board, commemorated the tercentenary of the Raid on the Medway. In 1969 she attended a naval review at Spithead together with her sisters Zeeland and Noord-Brabant, the cruiser De Ruyter and the frigates Van Nes and Evertsen. Holland participated in the NATO exercises Razor Sharp in 1969 and Northern Merger and Save Pass in 1974.

In July 1976 Holland, together with the frigates Tromp, Van Nes, Van Galen, the destroyer Zeeland, the submarine Dolfijn and the replenishment ship Poolster visited New York in commemoration of the country's 200 years anniversary. (Note: Other sources don't confirm Holland's participation (Henk Visser: The Netherlands Type 47A destroyer in: Warship 2016. John Jordan (ed). Conway, 2016, p. 184. ISBN 978-1-8448-6438-6))

HNLMS Holland was sold to the Peruvian Navy in 1978 as BAP García y García (DD75), which was taken out of service by Peru in 1986. The ship was named after Peruvian admiral Aurelio García y García.
