= HNLMS Gelderland (D811) =

Dutch navy ship

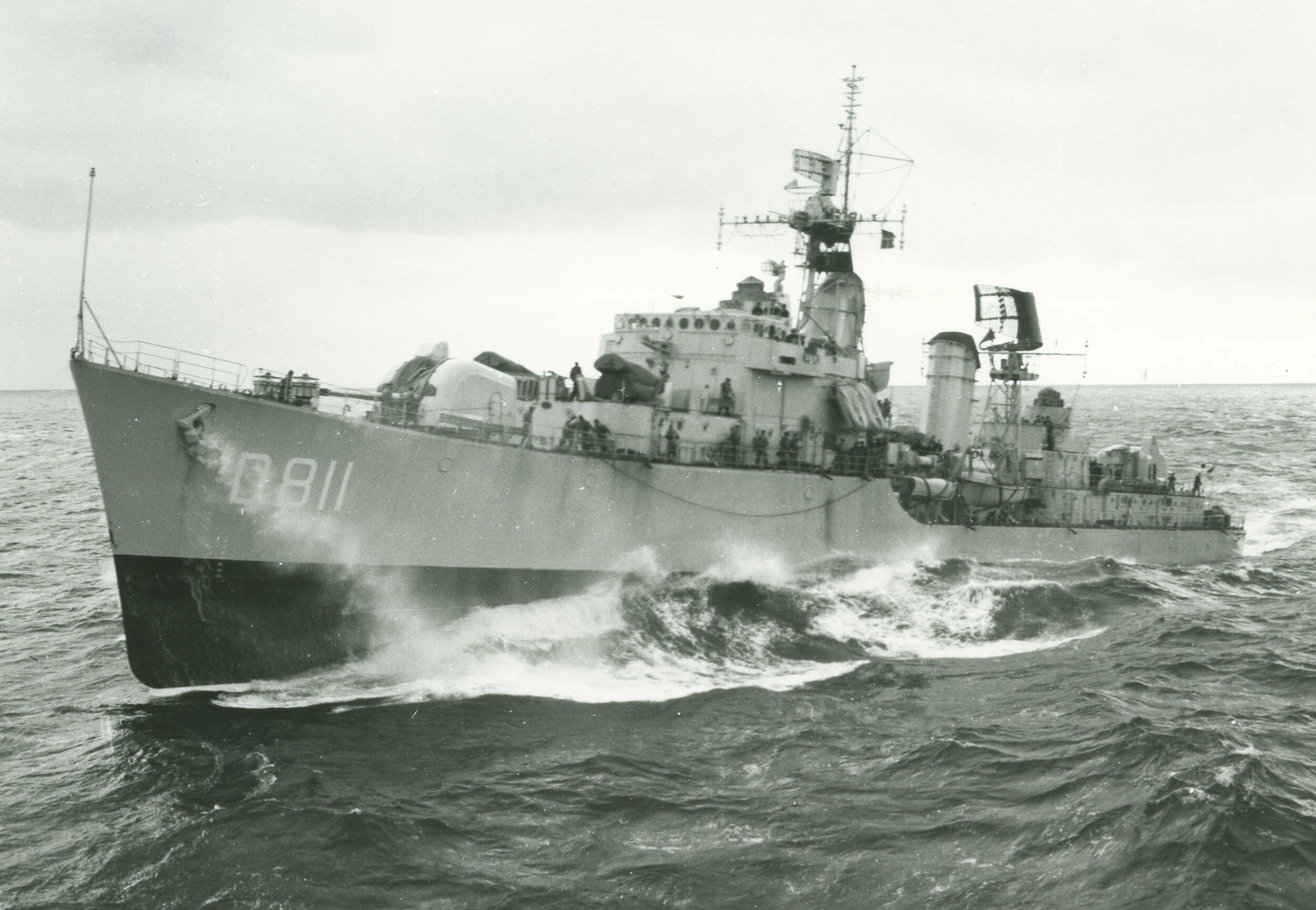
- Gelderland in 1959

History

Netherlands
- Name: Gelderland
- Namesake: Gelderland
- Ordered: 2 January 1948
- Builder: Wilton-Fijenoord
- Laid down: 10 March 1951
- Launched: 19 September 1953
- Commissioned: 17 August 1955
- Decommissioned: 1973
- Fate: Sold for scrap 1988

General characteristics
- Type: Holland-class destroyer
- Displacement: 2,150 long tons (2,185 t) standard; 2,600 long tons (2,642 t) full load
- Length: 113.1 m (371 ft 1 in)
- Beam: 11.4 m (37 ft 5 in)
- Draught: 5.1 m (16 ft 9 in)
- Propulsion: 2 shaft geared turbines, 2 boilers, 45,000 hp (33,556 kW)
- Speed: 32 knots (37 mph; 59 km/h)
- Range: 4,000 nmi (7,400 km) at 18 kn (33 km/h)
- Complement: 247
- Armament: 4 × Bofors 120 mm guns (2 × 2); 1 × 40 mm Bofors AA gun; 8 × 375 mm anti submarine mortars (2 × 4); 2 × depth charge racks

HNLMS Gelderland (D811) (Dutch: Hr. Ms. Gelderland) was a destroyer of the Holland class. The ship was in service with the Royal Netherlands Navy from 1955 to 1973. The destroyer was named after the Dutch province of Gelderland and was the twenty-first ship with this name. In 1973 the ship was taken out of service, after which it was given a berth in Amsterdam for the Technical Training Royal Navy (TOKM) school. During her service the ship's radio call sign was "PARY". The ship was sold for scrapping in 1988.

== History ==
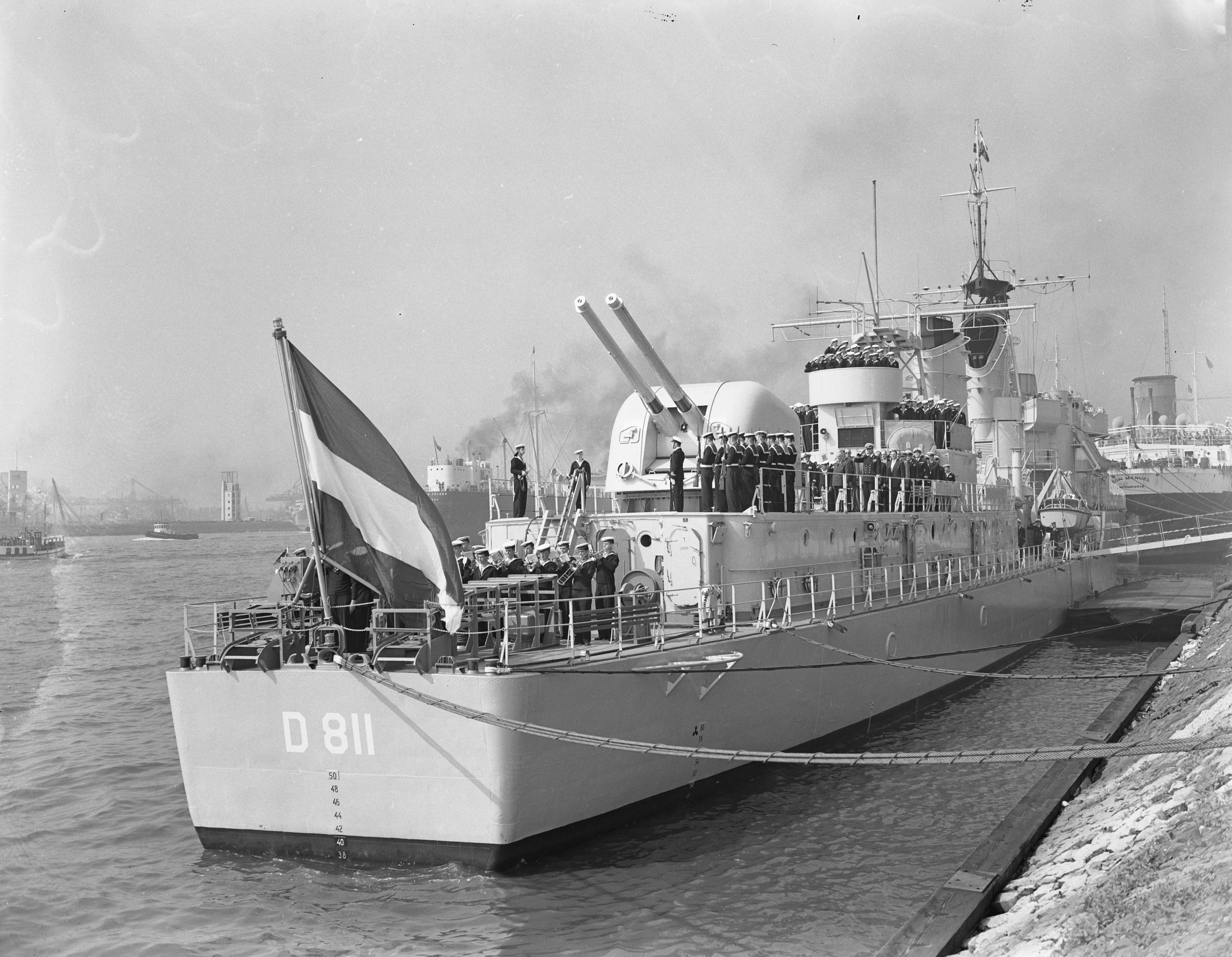

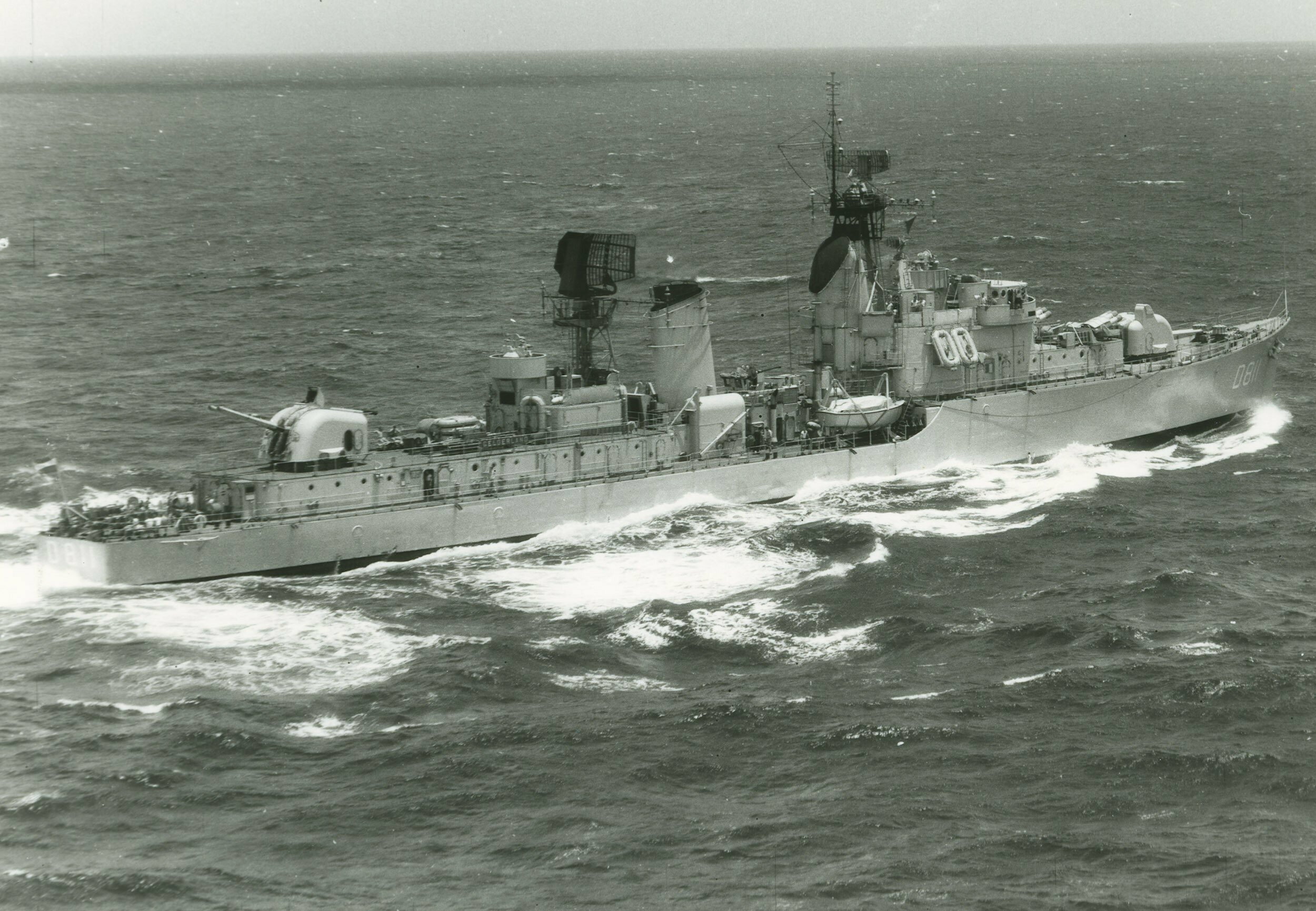
Gelderland in 1959; starboard view

HNLMS Gelderland was one of four Holland-class destroyers and built at the Wilton-Fijenoord yard in Schiedam. The keel laying took place on 10 March 1951 and the launching on 19 September 1953. The ship was put into service on 17 August 1955.

In 1955 she would make her first voyage to Lisbon. Afterward, she returned to her builder to correct some minor building errors. Gelderland took part in the national Navy days (Vlootweek) in 1958. In 1959 New York was visited during the festivities around the 350th anniversary of Henry Hudson’s voyage. She was sent to Morocco after an earthquake had struck city of Agadir in 1960. The ship was kept in reserve and laid up from 1964 until 1969.

After being decommissioned in 1973, Gelderland was given a position as an instruction vessel on the quay of the Marine Etablissement Amsterdam for the Technical Training Royal Navy (TOKM) school. The ship has laid at the quay between 1973 and 1988, after which it got sold to a scrap company in Zaandam. This company scrapped the ship in 1993.

== Sources ==
- Amstel, W.H.E. van (1991). De schepen van de Koninklijke Marine vanaf 1945. Alkmaar: De Alk. ISBN 978-9060139974.
- Brobbel, Henk (2008). Hr. Ms. Holland: de parel van het eskader. Soest: Boekscout VOF. ISBN 9789088342820.
- Gardiner, Robert, ed. (1995). Conway's All the World's Fighting Ships 1947–1995. London: Conway Maritime. ISBN 978-0-85177-605-7. OCLC 34284130. Also published as Gardiner, Robert; Chumbley, Stephen; Budzbon, Przemysław (1995). Conway's All the World's Fighting Ships 1947–1995. Annapolis, Maryland: Naval Institute Press. ISBN 978-1-55750-132-5. OCLC 34267261.
- Mark, Chris (2005). Onderzeebootjagers van de Holland- en Friesland-klasse. Amsterdam: Stichting Vrienden van de Koninklijke Marine. ISBN 978-9051230048.
- Jordan, John (2016). Warship 2016. London: Conway. ISBN 978-1844863266.
