= Holland-class destroyer =

Dutch destroyer

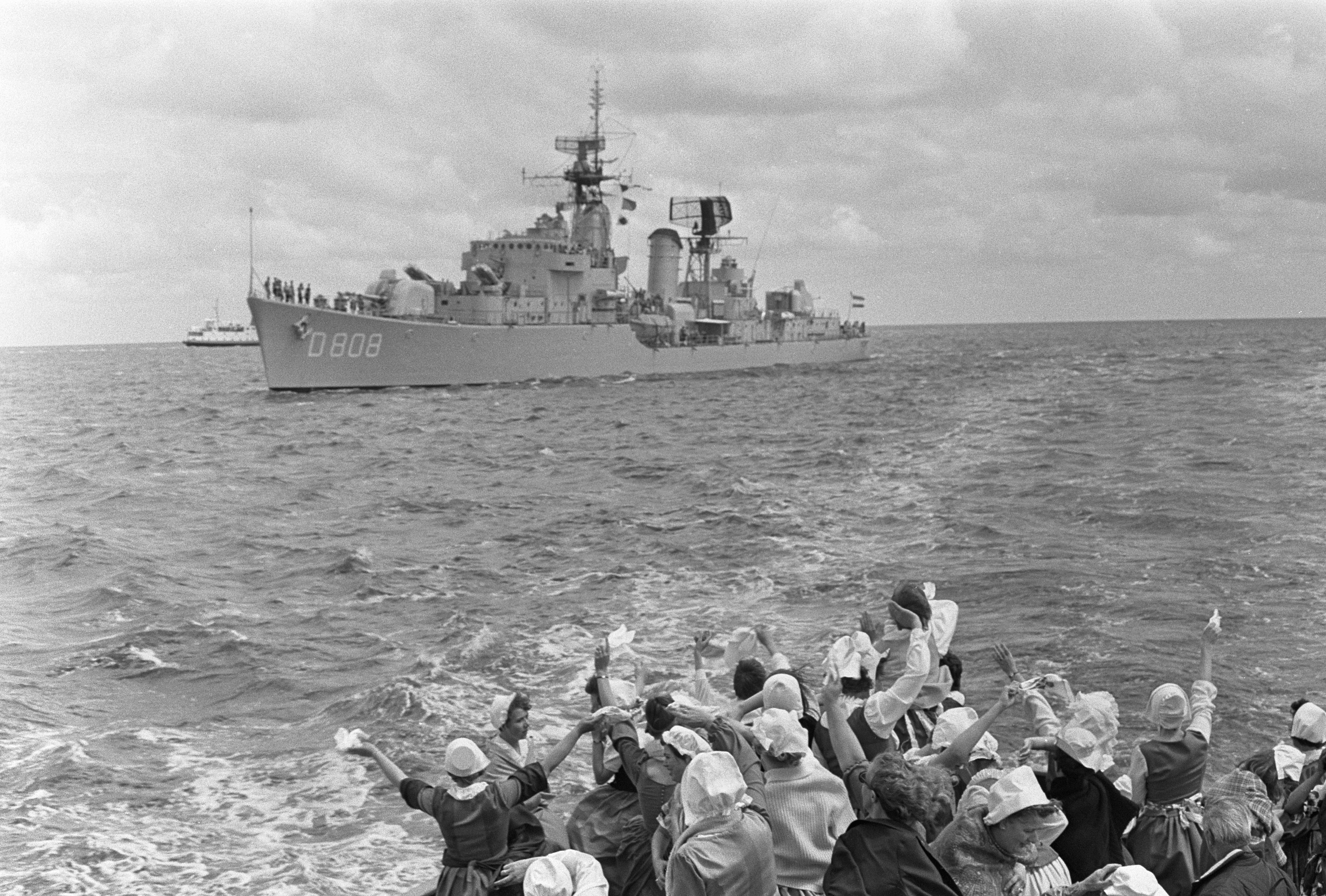
- HNLMS Holland

Class overview
- Name: Holland class
- Builders: Rotterdamsche Droogdok Maatschappij; Wilton-Fijenoord; Koninklijke Maatschappij De Schelde
- Operators: Royal Netherlands Navy; Peruvian Navy
- Preceded by: Gerard Callenburgh class
- Succeeded by: Kortenaer class
- Built: 1950-1955
- In commission: 1954–1986
- Planned: 6
- Completed: 4
- Canceled: 2

General characteristics
- Type: Destroyer
- Displacement: 2,150 long tons (2,185 t) standard; 2,600 long tons (2,642 t) full load
- Length: 113.1 m (371 ft 1 in)
- Beam: 11.4 m (37 ft 5 in)
- Draught: 5.1 m (16 ft 9 in)
- Propulsion: 2 shaft geared turbines, 2 boilers, 45,000 hp (33,556 kW)
- Speed: 32 knots (37 mph; 59 km/h)
- Range: 4,000 nmi (7,400 km) at 18 kn (33 km/h)
- Complement: 247
- Armament: 4 × Bofors 120 mm guns (2×2); 1 × 40 mm Bofors AA gun; 8 × Bofors 375 mm (14.8 in) anti-submarine rockets (2 × 4); 2 × depth charge racks

The Holland class destroyers (Note: In the Dutch navy the ships where classified as "onderzeebootjagers" literally translated: submarine hunters.) were built for the Royal Netherlands Navy in the 1950s. They were the first major warships designed and built by the Dutch after World War II. In contrast to previous Dutch Navy practice the ships were named after provinces rather than admirals. The Holland class was, together with the Friesland class, replaced by the Kortenaer class frigates.

== Background ==
The Second World War had a devastating impact on the fleets of the Royal Netherlands Navy. Many surface vessels and submarines were destroyed, either in battle or by mines, and some were scuttled to prevent capture by the enemy. The most notable surface vessels that were destroyed during the war were HNLMS Java, Sumatra and De Ruyter. This meant that the Royal Netherlands Navy had lost most of its firepower and was dependent on outdated and less powerful ships such as the light cruisers HNLMS Tromp and Jacob van Heemskerck. Thus when important members of the navy were able to meet for the first time in The Hague in 1945, they were faced with a huge challenge of rebuilding the fragile fleet of the Royal Netherlands Navy. The navy leadership had remained active during the Second World War and had laid out plans for future ships that needed to be built and how many of each class. The only obstacle was that there was little money left in the defence budget to put these plans into motion. The reason for this was that the Netherlands and its biggest colony, the Dutch East Indies had been occupied by foreign invaders during the war and a lot of infrastructure had been damaged during the fighting. This meant that a lot of money had to be dedicated to rebuilding infrastructure and to get the economy going again.

Nonetheless, the navy started to design new ships and ensured that preparatory work for rebuilding the fleet was started. Destroyers were one of the ship classes prioritized during the rebuilding effort, since they had shown their worth during the Second World War and the Netherlands had decided to specialize in NATO-context Anti-Submarine Warfare. Dutch naval experts at the time were especially urging the Royal Netherlands Navy to invest in submarine destroyers, since they predicted that these kind of ships would play a major role in future naval conflicts. This judgment was based on the evolution of the role of submarines since the First World War when looking back at the how successful they were in the following Second World War. They also recommended how they should be equipped and what tactics should be used to successfully counter submarines in battle. The base requirements set by the Royal Netherlands Navy for the Submarine destroyer 1947-class destroyers, as they were known at this time, reflected these recommendations. However, besides being able to destroy enemy submarines, the requirements also included protection against radioactivity and the ability to perform coastal bombardments. On the other hand, torpedo attacks on other surface ships were not included in the design of the destroyers.

In 1948, six hunters of the twelve planned destroyers were ordered. The four Holland-class destroyers were to be built by three different shipyards. HNLMS Holland was built by the Rotterdamsche Droogdok Maatschappij and HNLMS Gelderland by Wilton-Fijenoord, while Koninklijke Maatschappij de Schelde built the remaining two ships: HNLMS Noord-Brabant and HNLMS Zeeland. The construction took longer than expected because they were the first destroyers designed after the Second World War. The Royal Netherlands Navy had not built any new ships for more than five years and there had since been many technological advancements; to implement these advancements took more time than expected. There were also serious doubts about the stability of the new vessels, which resulted in extra measures such as building the mast construction with aluminum instead of steel. Another reason why the construction of the destroyers was delayed was due to financial problems of the Dutch navy. The navy spent a lot of money to perform maintenance on the old and outdated ships that it had in its inventory. Furthermore, the construction of the Holland-class destroyers cost more than estimated. To save costs and especially time, as the navy was in dire need of modern ships to replace some of its pre-war material, the four destroyers were provided with equipment that was built during the Second World War for the German Navy. In addition to these four submarine destroyers, two more other destroyers were planned to be built, but due to cost savings, the construction of these ships was postponed. Nonetheless, on 30 December 1954, the first Holland-class destroyer, Holland, was completed and taken into active service. She was followed by Zeeland, Noord-Brabant and Gelderland; these ships were commissioned in 1955.

All four destroyers of the Holland class served for many years in the Royal Netherlands Navy until they were retired in the 1970s.

== Design ==
These ships were unusual as they were the first destroyers built without large calibre anti-ship torpedoes. Their primary role was anti-submarine warfare and convoy defence. The specification was issued in 1947 and construction was approved in 1948.

=== Armament ===
The armament comprised two twin Bofors 120 mm (5 in) guns built in license by Wilton-Fijenoord, which were capable of firing 38 to 42 rounds per minute. The mountings were automated and stabilised with radar control and 720 rounds were stored per mounting. Initially British 114 mm (4.5 in) twin Mk 6 mountings were considered but rejected due to complexity, manpower requirements (19 men per mounting) and dependence on hydraulics for operation. The close-range anti-aircraft armament was reduced in service from the original six to just a single Bofors 40 mm (1.6 in) gun due top weight issues. Anti-submarine weaponry consisted of two quadruple Bofors 357 mm (14 in) anti-submarine mortars sited in 'B' position forward of the bridge.

=== Machinery ===
The turbine machinery was ordered before the war for the Gerard Callenburgh-class destroyers and hidden during the German occupation. The turbines were built by Werkspoor and four boilers were used. The ships had a unit machinery layout with alternating boiler rooms and turbine rooms.

=== Sensors ===
The radars were designed by Hollandse Signaal Apparaten; The ZW-01 provided surface warning, the DA-02 provided medium range surveillance and the LW-02 long range surveillance. Fire control was provided by the GA-03 and KA-01 radars. Sonars PAE-1N and CWE-10 were also fitted.

The superstructure was built of aluminium alloy in order to reduce weight and electric welding was used throughout.

The Royal Netherlands Navy considered replacing the after 120 mm turret with a guided missile system in the late 1950s but this project was cancelled.

== Service history ==
The destroyers of the Holland class regularly operated with the aircraft carrier Karel Doorman and together formed an ASW-Hunter-Killer-Group.

== Ships ==
The ships were built by three different Dutch shipyard.

| Ship | Pennant number | Builder | Laid down | Launched | Commissioned | Fate |
|---|---|---|---|---|---|---|
| Holland | D808 | RDM, Rotterdam | 21 April 1950 | 11 April 1953 | 31 December 1954 | Sold to the Peruvian Navy in 1978, as the BAP García y García, struck 1986 |
| Zeeland | D809 | KM de Schelde, Vlissingen | 21 January 1951 | 27 June 1953 | 1 March 1955 | Decommissioned 1979 |
| Noord-Brabant | D810 | KM de Schelde | 1 March 1951 | 28 November 1953 | 1 June 1955 | Decommissioned 1974, following damage in collision |
| Gelderland | D811 | Wilton-Fijenoord, Schiedam | 10 March 1951 | 19 September 1953 | 17 August 1955 | Decommissioned 1973 |

== See also ==
- List of destroyers of the Netherlands

Equivalent destroyers of the same era

- Skory class
- Ayanami class
- Östergötland class
- Zerstörer 1 class
- Artigliere class
