= Halland (disambiguation) =

Halland may refer to:

- Halland, historic province in Sweden
- Halland County, Sweden
- Halland, East Sussex, a village in East Hoathly with Halland parish, East Sussex, England
- HSwMS Halland, several ships of the Swedish Navy
- Halland-class destroyer, two ships built for the Swedish Navy in the 1950s
