= ARC 20 de Julio =

ARC 20 de Julio is the name of the following ships of the Colombian Navy:

- ARC 20 de Julio (D-05), a Halland-class destroyer in commission 1958–1984
- ARC 20 de Julio (PZE-46), an OPV-80-class offshore patrol vessel in commission since 2012
