= Bofors 57 mm Naval Automatic Gun L/60 =

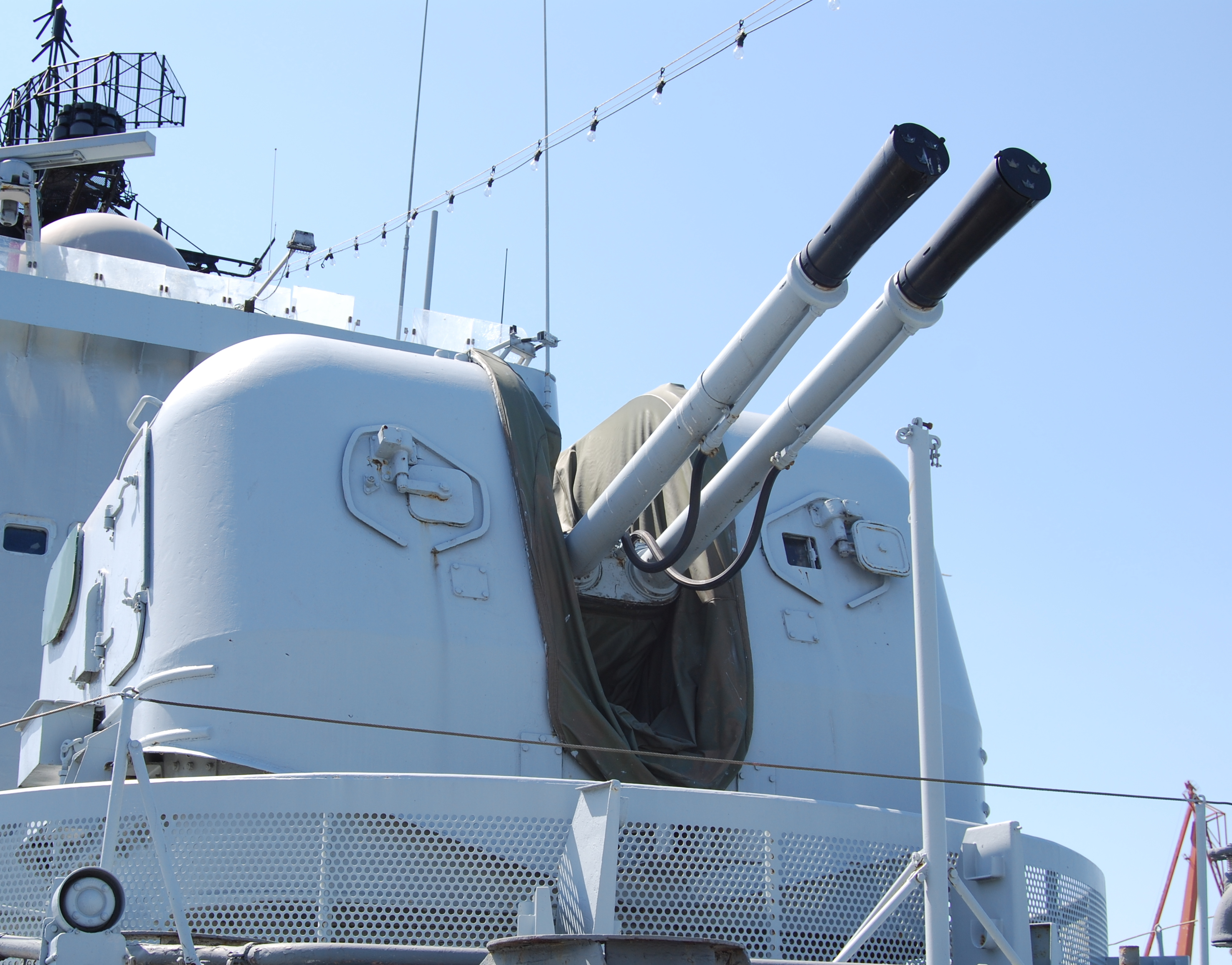
- Swedish Bofors 57 mm SAK 60 (57 mm akan m/50) on the destroyer HSwMS Småland
- Type: Naval Gun
- Place of origin: Sweden

Service history
- In service: 1952–1990
- Used by: Dutch Navy; Swedish Navy; French Navy

Production history
- Designed: 1950
- Manufacturer: Bofors
- Produced: 1950

Specifications
- Mass: Traversing mass: 24 t (24 long tons; 26 short tons)
- Barrel length: 60 calibres 3.420 m (11.22 ft)
- Crew: 8
- Shell: 57 × 438 mm R (m/50)
- Shell weight: 2.6 kg (5.7 lb)
- Calibre: 57 mm (2.2 in)
- Elevation: -9°/+90°, 30°/s
- Traverse: -360°, 30°/s
- Rate of fire: 2 × 130 rounds/min
- Muzzle velocity: 850–920 m/s (2,800–3,000 ft/s)
- Effective firing range: 13,000 m (43,000 ft) (max); 5,000 m (16,000 ft) (practical); 5,500 m (18,000 ft) AA ceiling

Bofors 57 mm Naval Automatic Gun L/60 (Swedish: 57 mm sjöautomatkanon L/60 (57 mm SAK 60)), also known as 57 mm/60 (2.25") SAK Model 1950 and the like (full English product name: Bofors 57 mm Automatic A.A. Gun L/60 In Stabilized Twin Turret), was a twin-barreled 57 mm (2.2 in) caliber fully automatic dual purpose naval artillery piece designed by the Swedish arms manufacturer Bofors from the early 1940s to the early 1950s to meet a request from the Dutch Navy. Besides the Dutch Navy, the weapon was also adopted by the Swedish and the French Navy, most predominantly by the latter.

== Design ==
The Bofors 57 mm Naval Automatic Gun L/60 is at its core a scaled up version of the famous Bofors 40 mm Automatic Gun L/70, but constructed as a twin-gun system sharing the same receiver/mantle with ammunition feeding from the sides into each gun. The guns were water-cooled and fed by large 80-cartridge magazines that allowed several long bursts to be fired without reloading.

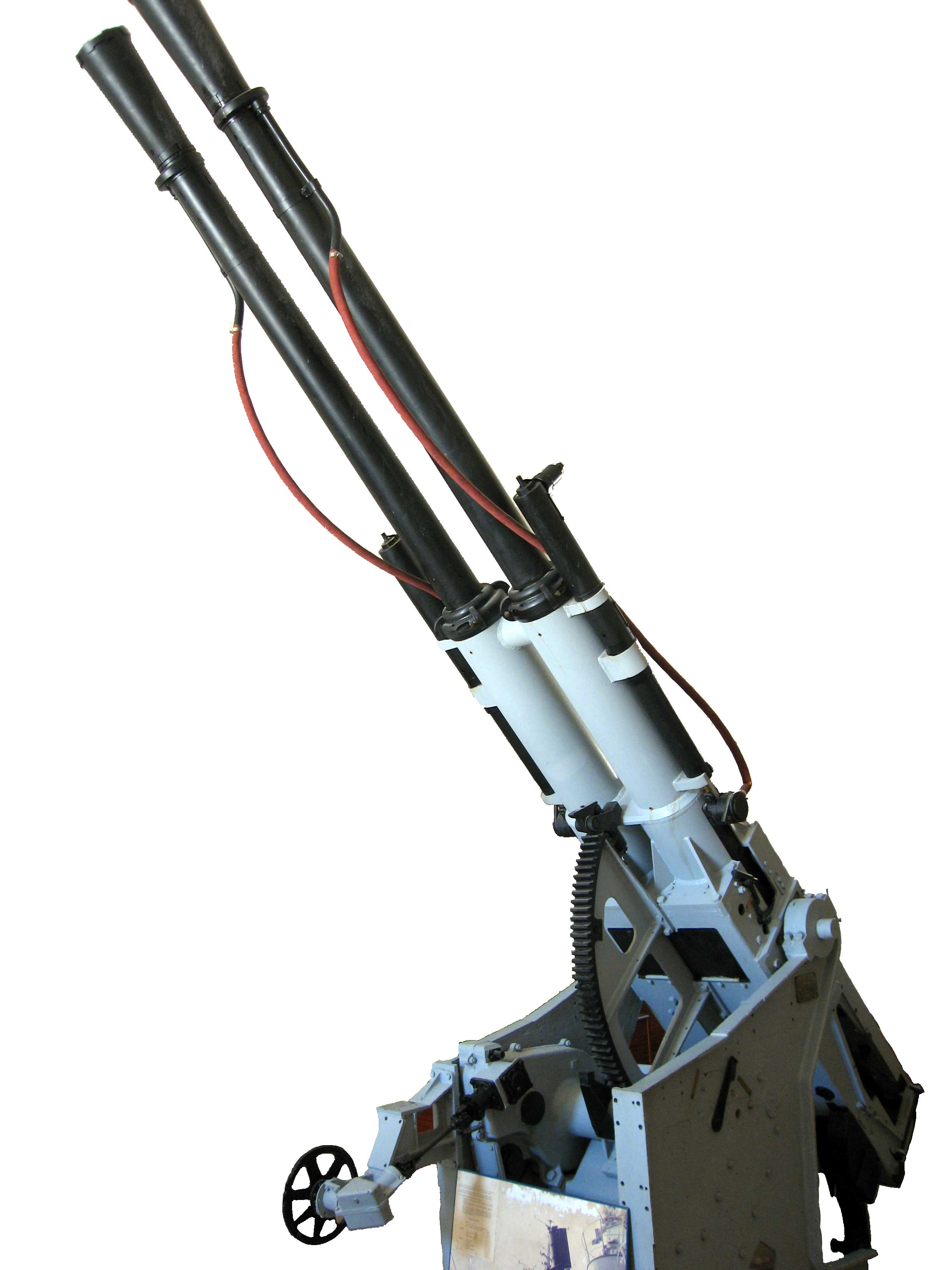
French "57mm/60 modèle 1951" on display at Port-Louis naval museum.

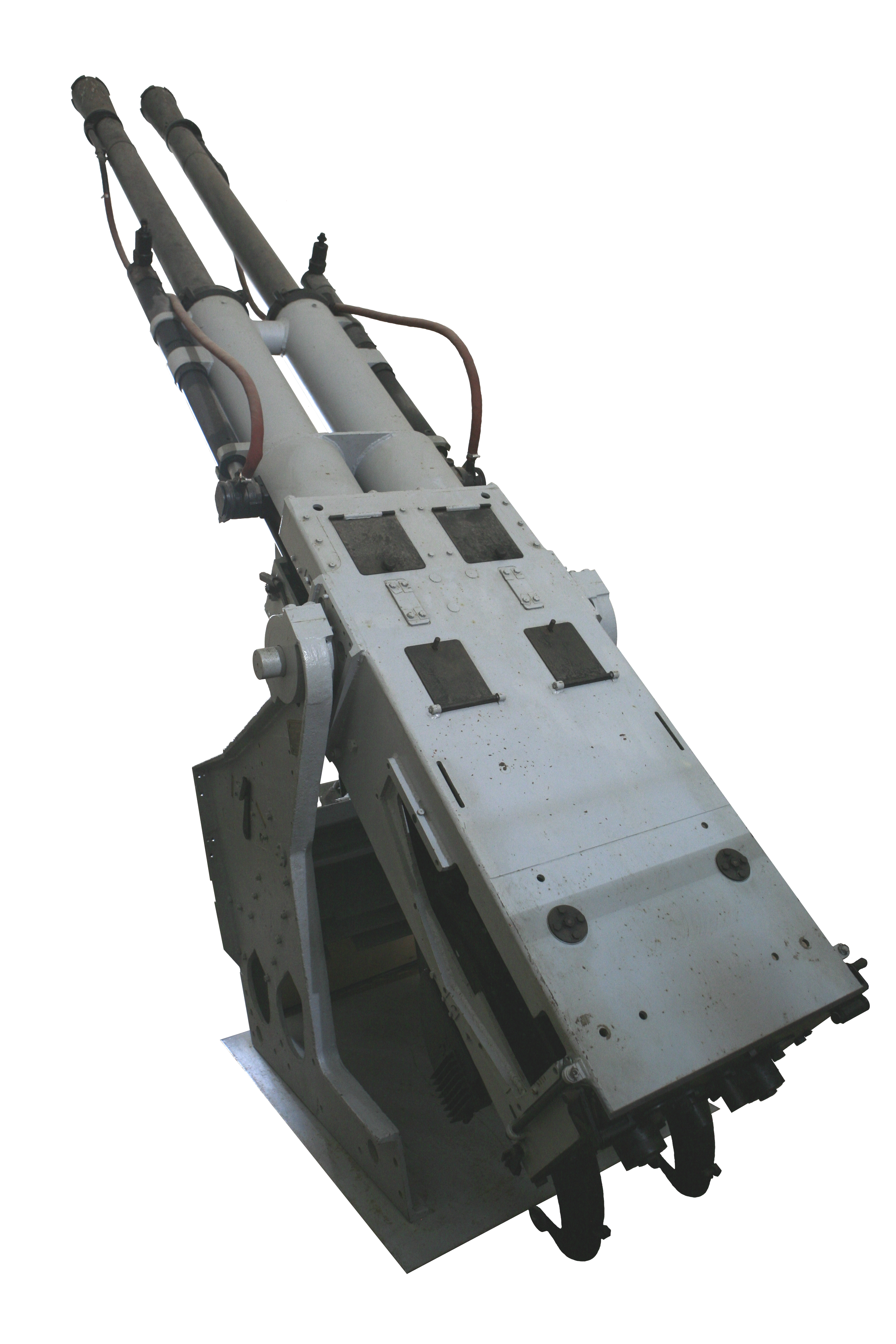
French "57mm/60 modèle 1951" on display at Port-Louis naval museum.

== Use in the Dutch Navy ==
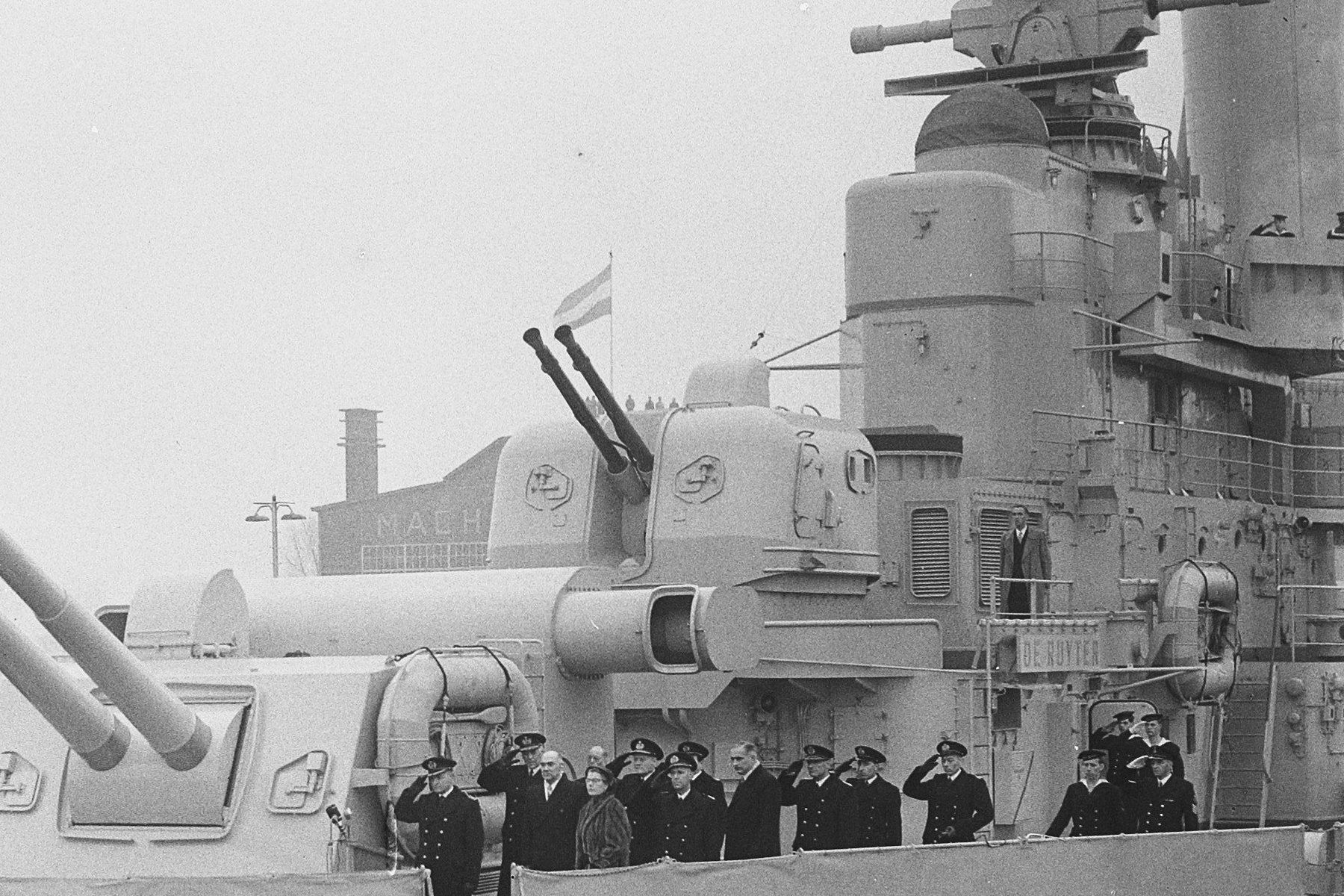
Dutch Bofors 57 mm SAK 60 on the cruiser HNLMS De Ruyter.

The Dutch were the initial users of the Bofors 57 mm Naval Automatic Gun L/60. As part of rebuilding the Dutch Navy post World War II, the Dutch Navy had requested several naval gun systems to be developed by Bofors for their next generation of naval-vessels, one being a twin-barreled 57 mm dual-purpose gun for the planned De Zeven Provinciën-class cruisers HNLMS De Ruyter and De Zeven Provinciën. This request led to the creation of the Bofors 57 mm Naval Automatic Gun L/60, which entered active service with the Dutch Navy in 1953 mounted on the cruisers De Ruyter and De Zeven Provinciën.

== Use in the Swedish Navy ==
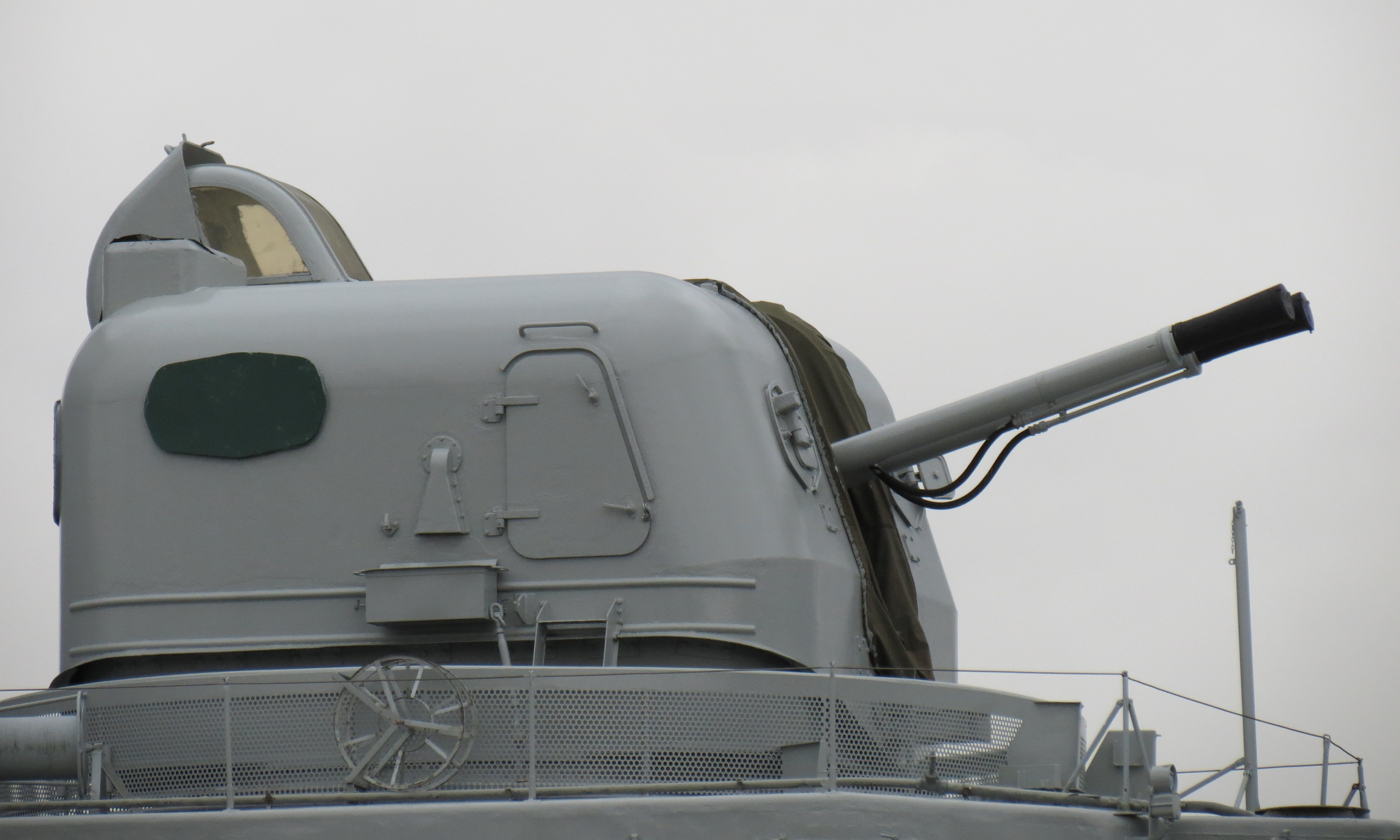
Swedish 57 mm akan m/50 on the destroyer HSwMS Småland

Following the Dutch example, the Swedish navy decided to acquire the new 57 mm system for a new generation of destroyers in 1950. In Swedish service the weapon was fitted to the Halland-class destroyers HSwMS Halland and Småland, both of which entered service in 1956. The weapon was initially designated 57 mm automatkanon m/50 (57 mm akan m/50), meaning "57 mm autocannon m/50", but around 1970 the weapon was redesignated to 57 mm torndubbelautomatpjäs m/50 (57 mm tdblapjäs m/50), meaning "57 mm turret double automatic piece m/50" (literal).

The gun was in use until the Halland-class destroyers were taken out of service.

== Use in the French Navy ==
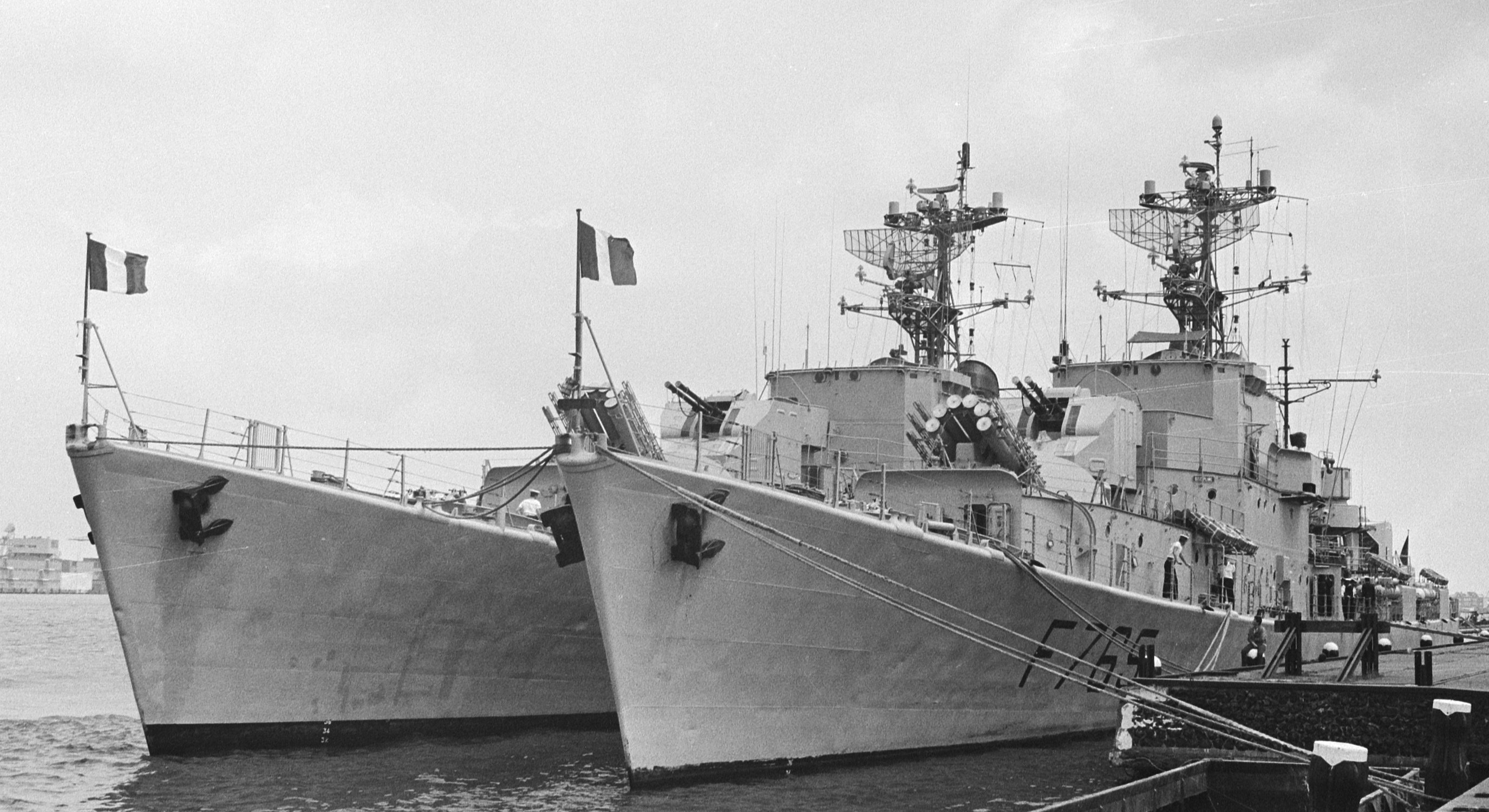
Two French Le Normand-class frigates fitted with 57mm/60 mle 51 turrets on the bow.

The Bofors 57 mm L/60 naval gun was also purchased by the French Navy and came to serve on a number of naval-vessels under the designation 57mm/60 modèle 1951 (57mm/60 mle 51) from 1952 onward, although primarily post 1956. The French navy version of the system featured a French designed naval mount that maintained the system in mechanical equilibrium, even when firing. The French mounting was some 8 tons lighter than the Dutch/Swedish version.

In French service the gun notably armed light escorts as main guns and larger ships as secondary guns. The following French ships were armed with the 57mm/60 mle 51 system:

- The battleship Jean Bart (1952 retrofit)
- The anti-aircraft cruiser De Grasse
- The anti-aircraft cruiser Colbert
- Le Normand-class frigates
- T 47-class fleet escorts (also known as the Surcouf class)
- T 53-class fleet escorts

== See also ==
- Bofors 57 mm Automatic Anti-Aircraft Gun L/60 – single gun anti air development of the Bofors 57 mm Naval Automatic Gun L/60
- Bofors 57 mm Naval Automatic Gun L/70 – single gun replacement design for the Bofors 57 mm Naval Automatic Gun L/60
- Bofors 120 mm Automatic Gun L/50
