= HSwMS Halland =

Several ships of the Swedish Navy have been named HSwMS Halland, named after Halland province:

- Halland, a ship of the line launched in 1682 and sunk in 1722
- Halland, a galley launched in 1749
- HSwMS Halland (J18), a Halland-class destroyer launched in 1952 and decommissioned in 1987
- HSwMS Halland (Hnd), a Gotland-class submarine launched in 1996 and commissioned in July 1997
