= HSwMS Småland (J19) =

Swedish destroyer and museum ship

Coordinates: 57°42′34.0″N 11°57′35.0″E

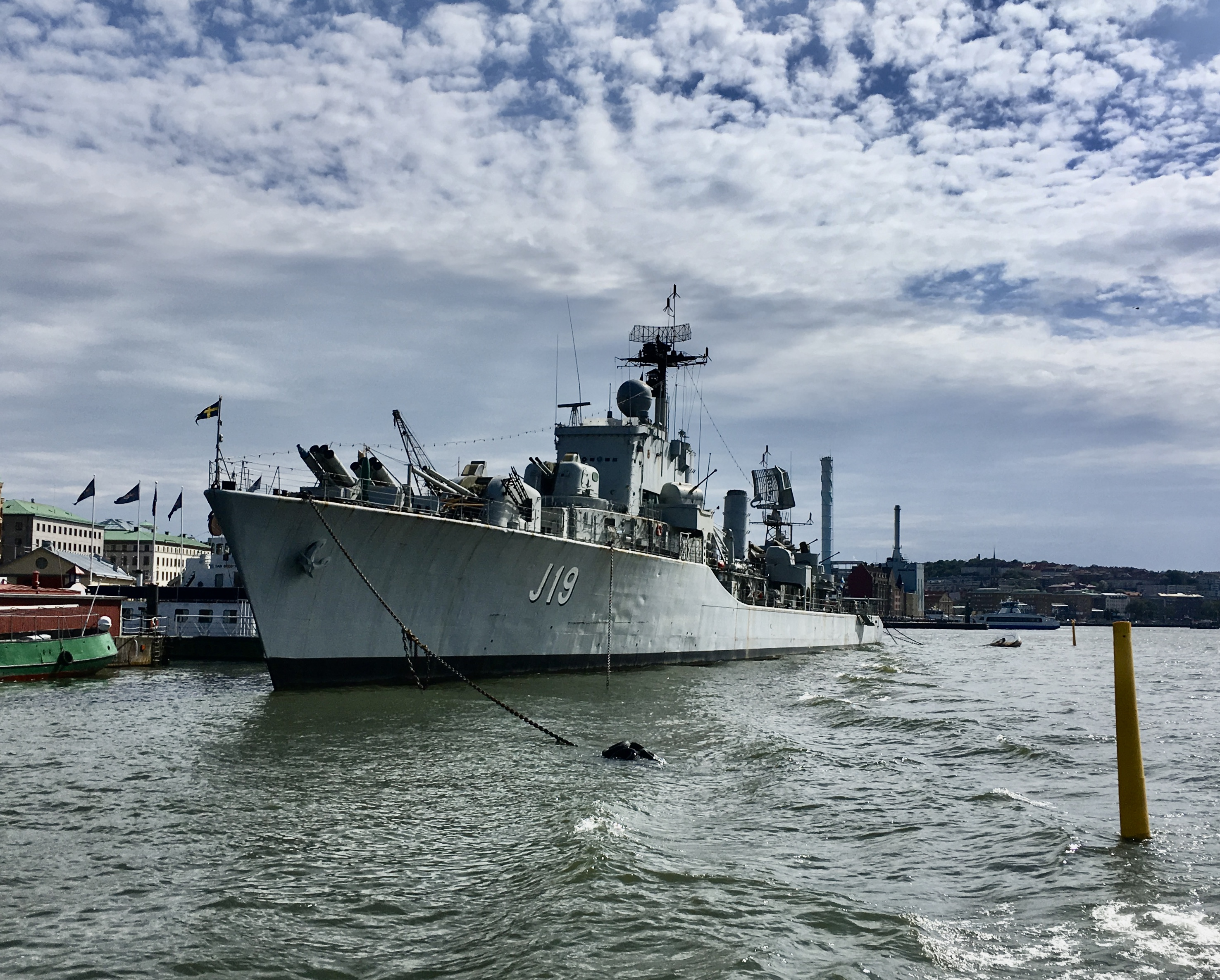
- HMS Småland seen in 2018.

History

Sweden
- Name: Småland
- Namesake: Småland
- Builder: Eriksbergs Mekaniska Verkstads AB, Gothenburg
- Laid down: 1951
- Launched: 23 October 1952
- Christened: 23 October 1952
- Commissioned: 12 January 1956
- Decommissioned: 1979
- Out of service: 1 July 1984
- Identification: J19
- Fate: Museum ship in Gothenburg
- Badge

General characteristics
- Class & type: Halland-class destroyer
- Displacement: 2,670 t (2,630 long tons) standard; 3,344 t (3,291 long tons) full load
- Length: 121.6 m (398 ft 11 in)
- Beam: 12.1 m (39 ft 8 in)
- Draft: 4.24 m (13 ft 11 in)
- Propulsion: 2 shaft geared turbines, 2 boilers, 58,000 hp (43,000 kW)
- Speed: 37 kn (69 km/h; 43 mph)
- Range: 3,000 nmi (5,600 km; 3,500 mi) at 20 knots (37 km/h; 23 mph); 445 nmi (824 km; 512 mi) at 35 knots (65 km/h; 40 mph)
- Complement: 272 (peacetime)
- Sensors & processing systems: Radar Scanter 009; Thomson-CSF Saturn; HSA M22
- Armament: 4 × Bofors 120 mm (4.7 in) guns (2 × 2); 2 × Bofors 57 mm (2.2 in) guns (1 × 2); 6 × Bofors 40 mm (1.6 in) AA guns (6 × 1); 8 × 533 mm (21.0 in) torpedo tubes (1 × 5 and 1 × 3) for wire-guided Torped 61; 1 or 2 launch rails for Saab Robot 08 anti-ship missiles; 8 × Bofors 375 mm (14.8 in) anti-submarine rockets (2 × 4)

HSwMS Småland (J19) is a Swedish Halland-class destroyer. She and HSwMS Halland were the only ones built of their class. Two more ships were ordered but they were never completed.

She was decommissioned in 1979 and, since 1987, has been a museum ship at Maritiman in Gothenburg, where she is the largest vessel on display.

== Design ==
Småland is 121 meters long and 12.6 meters wide. The hull was designed with a forecastle. From the forecastle and astern, a long superstructure appeared, which made it possible for the crew to reach the entire ship without having to go outdoors, thus minimizing the risk of exposure to radioactive contamination. Unlike previous destroyer classes, whose superstructures were built of aluminum, the Halland-class was built of steel. Aluminum gave ships a lower weight but had the disadvantage in a case of fire, when it melts at a much lower temperature than steel. To keep the weight down, therefore, corrugated galvanised iron was used in the superstructure.

The machinery consisted of steam boilers and steam turbines. Two Penhoët boilers delivered steam with a pressure of 40 bar and a temperature of 420 degrees to two de Laval turbines. The effect was a total of 58,000 horsepower, which gave the ship a maximum speed of 35 knots (65 km/h).

The main armament consisted of two fully automatic double Bofors 120 mm gun model 1950, which were initially directed from a central sight, which was later replaced by a new artillery radar sight connected to the radar. The secondary armament consisted of a double Bofors 57 mm anti-aircraft gun model 1950 and six single Bofors 40 mm L/70. The former was initially controlled from a central sight on the bridge and later by a digital fire control housed in the characteristic radome over the bridge deck. The torpedo armament consisted of two tube racks with a total of eight torpedo tubes. Regarding anti-submarine warfare, there was a hydrophone housed in a dome under the forebody which could be retracted into the hull when the hydrophone was not used. When a submarine was discovered, eight Bofors 375 mm rocket launchers, each with a 100 kg charge and a range of 300 - 1,200 meters, could be fired in a pattern around, above and below the target from two directable four-barrelled launchers. In the stern, there was also a mounting with two launch rails for firing the Robot 08 anti-ship missile.

== History ==
Småland was built at Eriksbergs Mekaniska Verkstad in Gothenburg and was launched on 23 October 1952 when she was christened by Admiral Helge Strömbäck. After extensive work on equipment and installation of all components, the ship was delivered to the Swedish Navy on 12 January 1956.

During the first time, Småland together with the sister ship Halland constituted a destroyer division. When the cruisers HSwMS Tre Kronor and HSwMS Göta Lejon were scrapped in the early 1970s, the ships of the Halland-class were the largest and most powerful vessels in the Swedish Navy, and later they became the leader ships for each their destroyer flotilla.

Småland was taken out of service in 1979 and decommissioned on 1 July 1984. In 1987, she was handed over to the Maritiman, where she remains as a museum ship and is the last surviving Swedish destroyer.
