= ARC 20 de Julio (D-05) =

One of the two Colombian Halland-class destroyers

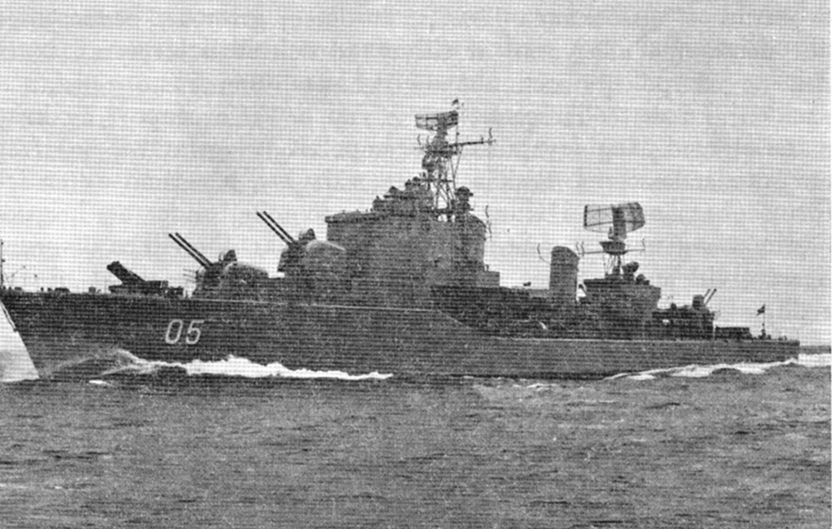
- ARC 20 de Julio

History

Colombia
- Name: 20 de Julio
- Namesake: Veinte de Julio
- Builder: Eriksbergs Mekaniska Verkstads AB
- Laid down: October 1955
- Launched: 26 June 1956
- Commissioned: 15 June 1958
- Decommissioned: 1984
- Renamed: from Veinte de Julio
- Identification: Pennant number: D-05
- Fate: Scrapped, 1986

General characteristics
- Class & type: 20 de Julio-class destroyer
- Displacement: 2,690 t (2,650 long tons) standard; 3,300 t (3,200 long tons) full load
- Length: 121 m (397 ft 0 in)
- Beam: 12.4 m (40 ft 8 in)
- Draft: 4.7 m (15 ft 5 in)
- Propulsion: 2 shaft geared turbines, 2 boilers, 55,000 hp (41,000 kW)
- Speed: 32 kn (59 km/h; 37 mph)
- Range: 3,000 nmi (5,600 km; 3,500 mi) at 20 knots (37 km/h; 23 mph); 445 nmi (824 km; 512 mi) at 35 knots (65 km/h; 40 mph)
- Complement: 248
- Sensors & processing systems: Radar Scanter 009; Thomson-CSF Saturn; HSA M22
- Armament: 3 × dual Bofors 120 mm Naval Automatic Gun L/50 turrets; 4 × single Bofors 40 mm guns; 1 × quad 533 mm (21.0 in) torpedo tubes; 1 × quad Bofors 375mm anti submarine rockets

ARC 20 de Julio (D-05) is one of the two Colombian Halland-class destroyer. She and ARC 7 de Agosto were the only ones built of their class. Two more ships were ordered but they were never completed. She had the previous name of Veinte de Julio prior to renaming.

== Design ==
20 de Julio was 121 meters long and 12.6 meters wide. The hull was designed with a forecastle and a long, continuous superstructure which made it possible for the crew to reach the entire ship without having to go outside, thus minimizing the risk of exposure to radioactive contamination. Unlike previous destroyer classes, whose superstructure was built of aluminum, the Halland-class was built of steel. Aluminum gave ships a lower weight but had the disadvantage that, it melted at a much lower temperature than steel in a shipboard fire. To keep the weight down therefore, corrugated galvanised iron was used in the superstructure.

The machinery consisted of steam boilers and steam turbines. Two Penhoët boilers delivered steam with a pressure of 40 bar and the temperature of 420 degrees to two de Laval turbines. The effect was a total of 58,000 horsepower, which gave the ship a maximum speed of 35 knots (65 km/h).

The main armament consisted of three fully automatic double Bofors 120 mm gun model 1950 which were initially directed from a central sight which was later replaced by a new artillery radar sight connected to the radar. The secondary armament consisted of four single Bofors 40 mm L/70. The former was initially controlled from a central sight on the bridge and later by a digital fire control housed in the characteristic radome over the bridge deck. The torpedo armament consisted of two quadruple sets with a total of eight torpedo tubes. Regarding anti-submarine warfare, there was a sonar housed in a dome which could be retracted into the hull when not in use. When a submarine was discovered, four Bofors 375mm anti submarine rockets, each with a 100 kg charge and a range of 300 - 1,200 meters, could be fired in a pattern around, above and below the target from a trainable four-barrelled launcher.

== History ==
20 de Julio was built at Eriksbergs Mekaniska Verkstad in Gothenburg and was launched on 26 June 1952 and delivered to the Colombian Navy on 15 June 1956.

During her 26 years of operational use the unit did not participate in any major actions, except for periodic exercises with US Navy ships. She was decommissioned in 1986 and later scrapped.

== Bibliography ==
- Borgenstam, Curt; Insulander, Per; Kaudern, Gösta (1989). Jagare: med Svenska flottans jagare under 80 år (in Swedish). Västra Frölunda: Marinlitteratur. ISBN 91-970700-4-1. SELIBR 7792227.
- Scheina, Robert L. & Smigielski, Adam (1995). "Columbia". In Chumbley, Stephen (ed.). Conway's All the World's Fighting Ships, 1947–1995 (revised ed.). Naval Institute Press. pp. 68–70. ISBN 1-55750-132-7.
- von Hofsten, Gustaf; Waernberg, Jan; Ohlsson, Curt S. (2003). Örlogsfartyg: svenska maskindrivna fartyg under tretungad flagg. [Forum navales skriftserie], 1650-1837; [6] (in Swedish). Stockholm: Svenskt militärhistoriskt bibl. i samarbete med Marinlitteratur. ISBN 919743843X. SELIBR 8873330.
