= Bofors 120 mm Naval Automatic Gun L/50 =

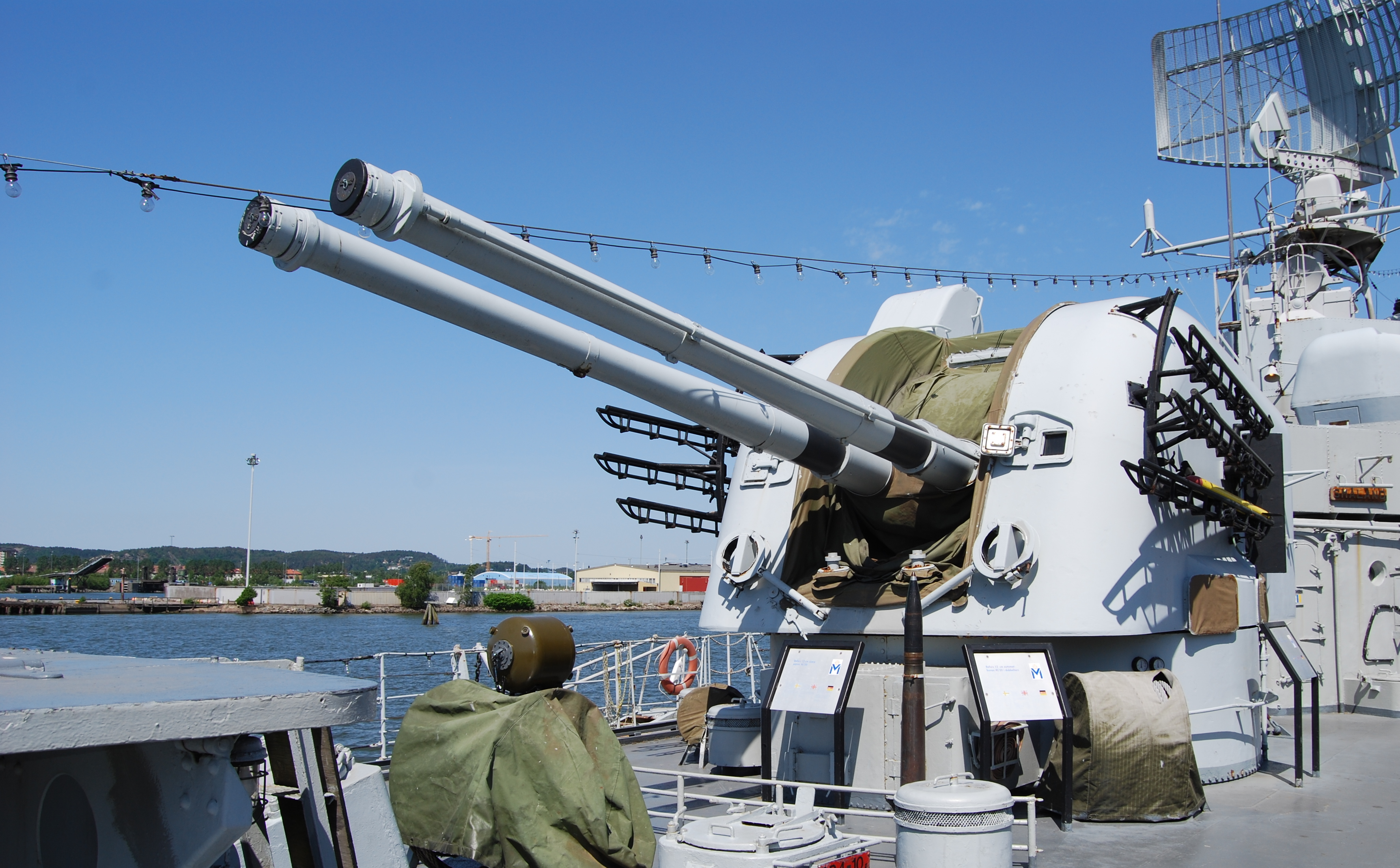
- Swedish 12 cm akan M/50 turret on Destroyer HMS Småland, 2008.
- Type: Naval gun
- Place of origin: Sweden

Service history
- In service: 1954 – 2001
- Used by: Royal Netherlands Navy; Swedish Navy; Colombian National Navy

Production history
- Designer: AB Bofors
- Designed: 1950
- Manufacturer: AB Bofors
- No. built: 54

Specifications
- Mass: 67,000 kg (148,000 lb)
- Barrel length: L/50 (including breach)
- Shell: 120 × 835 mm R
- Shell weight: 23.35 – 23.5 kg
- Caliber: 120 millimetres (4.7 in)
- Barrels: 2 ×
- Action: Automatic extraction with integrated autoloader
- Elevation: -9°/+85°, 25°/s
- Traverse: 360°, 22°/s
- Rate of fire: 2 × 42 rounds/min
- Muzzle velocity: 835–850 m/s (2,740–2,790 ft/s)
- References: Bofors 1958, AMKAT Marinen, 1977

Bofors 120 mm Naval Automatic Gun L/50 (full English product name: Bofors 120 mm Automatic Gun L/50 In Naval Twin Turret), also known as Bofors 120 mm gun model 1950 and the like, was a Swedish twin-barreled 120 mm (4.7 in) caliber fully automatic dual purpose naval gun turret system designed by Bofors from the end of the 1940s to the early 1950s to meet a request from the Dutch Navy. Besides the Dutch Navy, the weapon was also adopted by the Swedish and the Colombian Navy.

== Use in the Dutch Navy ==
The Dutch were the initial users of the Bofors 120 mm Naval Automatic Gun L/50. As part of rebuilding the Dutch Navy post WWII, the Dutch Navy had requested several naval gun systems to be developed by Bofors for their next generation of naval-vessels, one being a twin-barreled 120 mm dual-purpose gun for the then planned Holland-class destroyers. This request led to the creation of the Bofors 120 mm Naval Automatic Gun L/50.

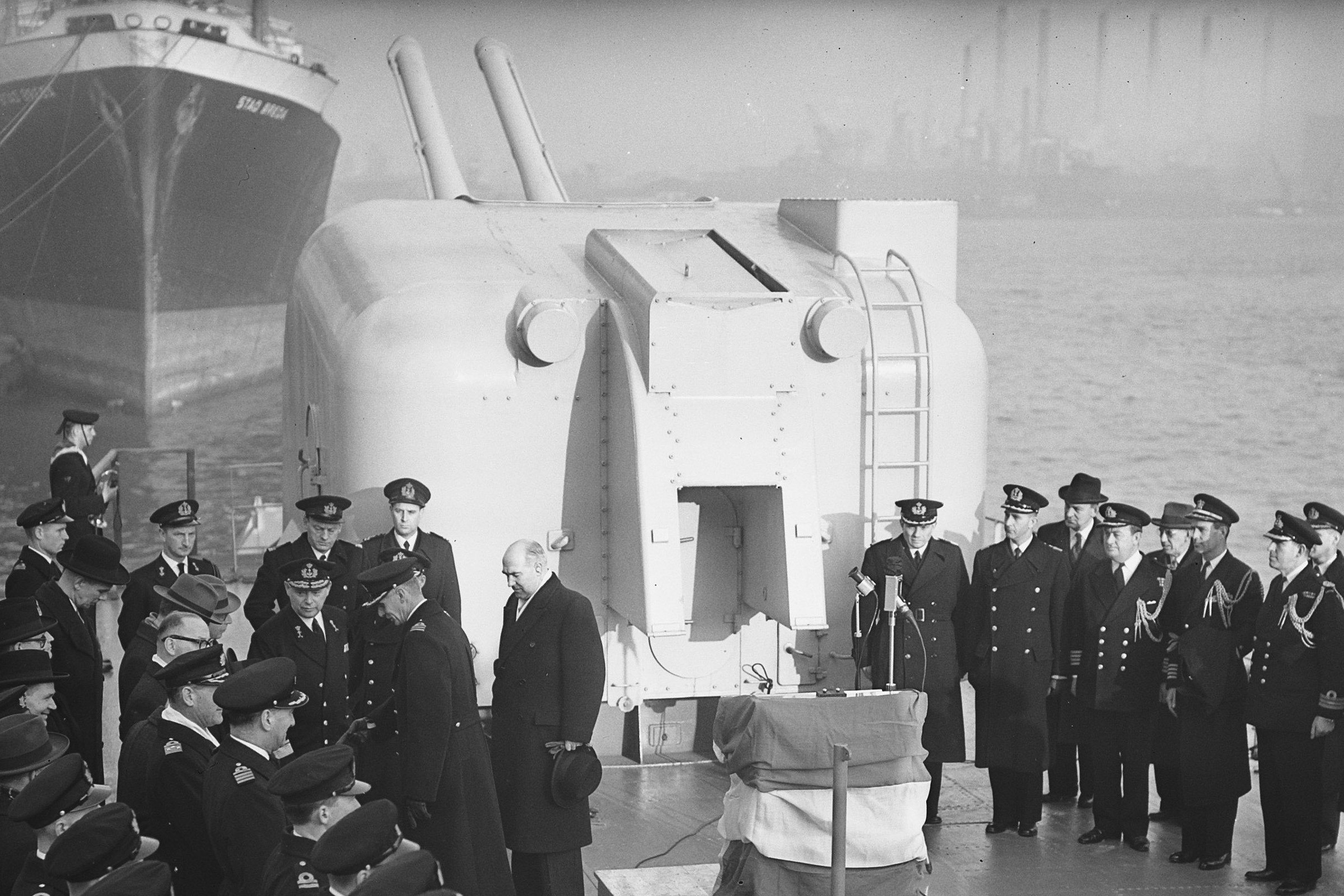
Bofors 120 mm Naval Automatic Gun L/50 from the back onboard the stern of the Holland-class destroyer HNLMS Holland (D808).

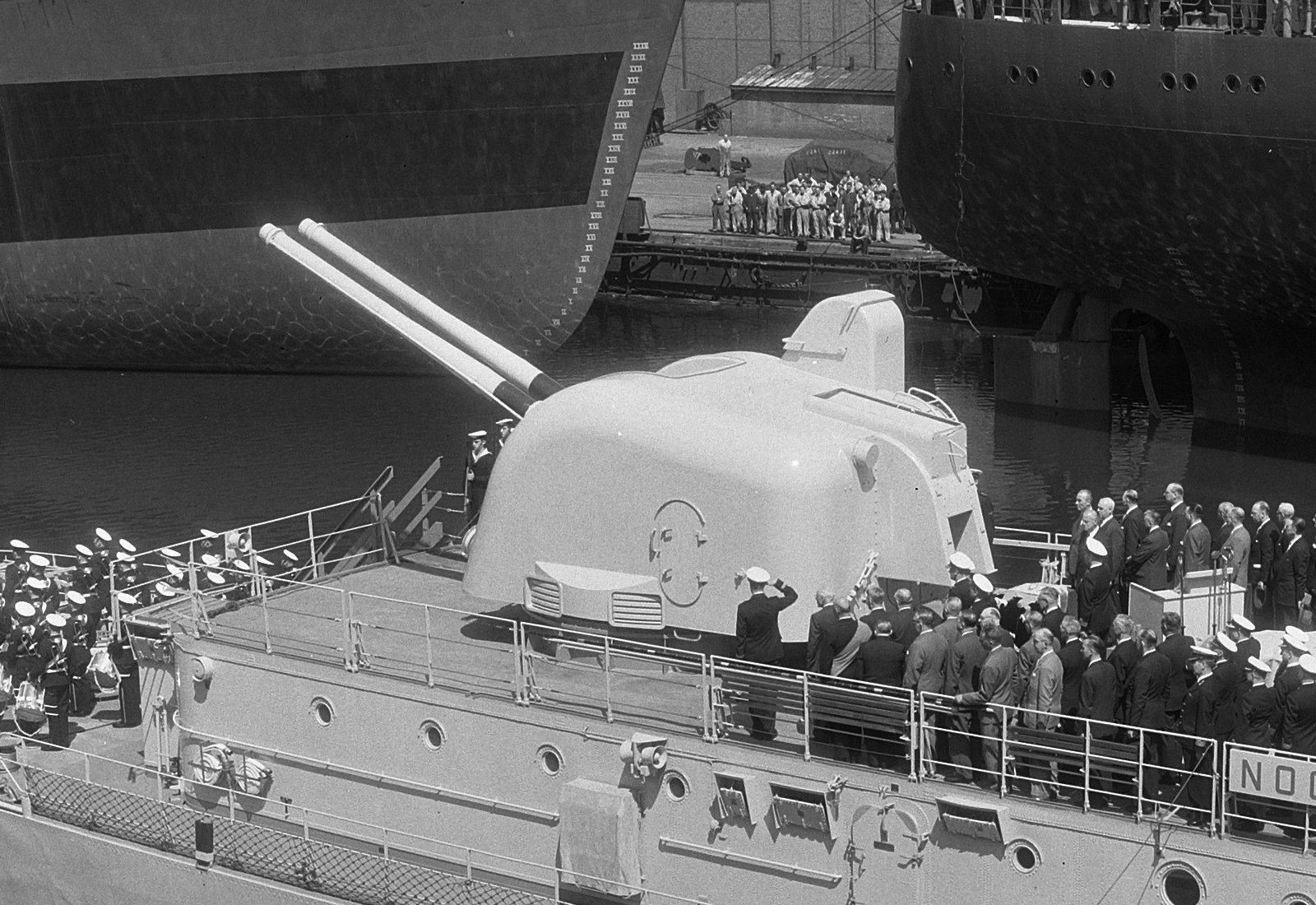
Bofors 120 mm Naval Automatic Gun L/50 from the back left onboard the stern of the Holland-class destroyer HNLMS Noord-Brabant (D810).

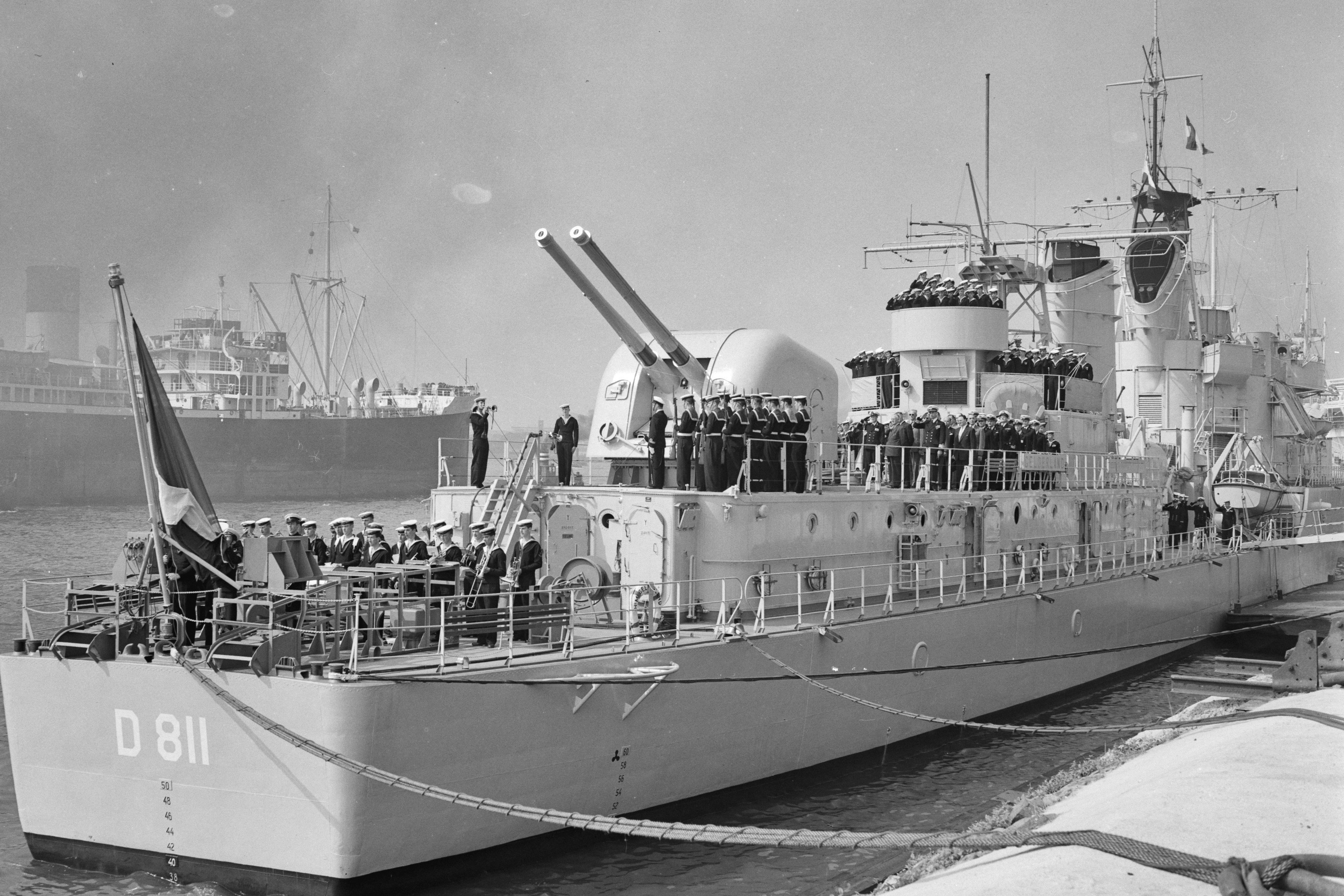
Bofors 120 mm Naval Automatic Gun L/50 from the front left onboard the stern of the Holland-class destroyer HNLMS Gelderland (D811).

The gun entered active service with the Dutch Navy in 1954 mounted on the Holland-class destroyers. Even before the first Holland-class destroyer had been completed the Dutch Navy decided to order yet another class of destroyer armed with the Bofors 120 mm L/50, the Friesland-class destroyer. The Dutch really liked the design and decided in the mid 1970s to save two turrets from the Holland-class destroyer HNLMS Gelderland (D811) when she was decommissioned in 1973, and then fit them to the new Tromp-class frigates under construction.

== Use in the Swedish Navy ==
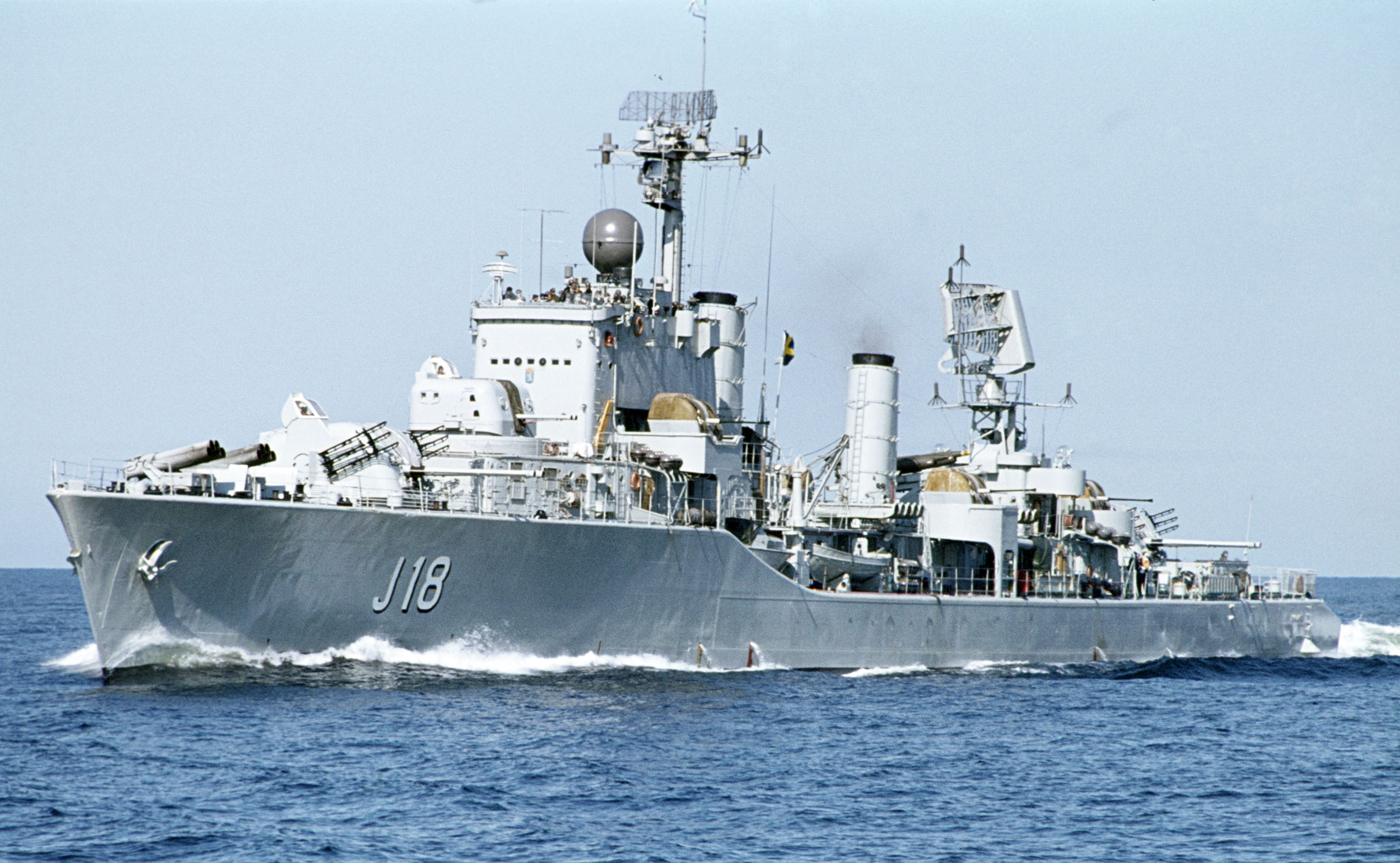
HSwMS Halland (J18) aiming both of her 12 cm akan M/50 turrets (bow & stern), 1972.

Following the Dutch example, the Swedish Navy decided to acquire the new 120 mm system being developed for them and fit it to a new generation of destroyers in 1950. In Swedish service the weapon was fitted to the Halland-class destroyers HSwMS Halland (J18) and HSwMS Småland (J19), both of which entered service in 1956. The weapon was initially designated 12 cm automatkanon M/50 (12 cm akan M/50), lit. "12 cm autocannon M/50", but around 1970 the weapon was redesignated to 12 cm torndubbelautomatpjäs M/50 (12 cm tdblapjäs M/50), lit. "12 cm turret double automatic (artillery)piece M/50".

The gun was in use until the Halland-class destroyers were taken out of service.

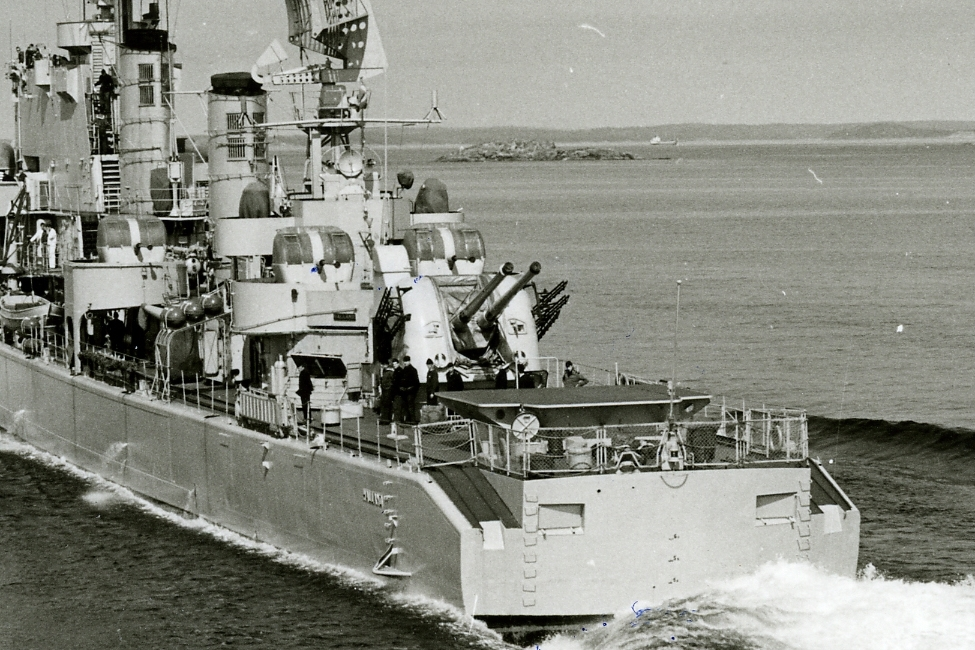
Swedish 12 cm akan m/50 stern-turret on Destroyer HSwMS Halland (J18) 1960's.

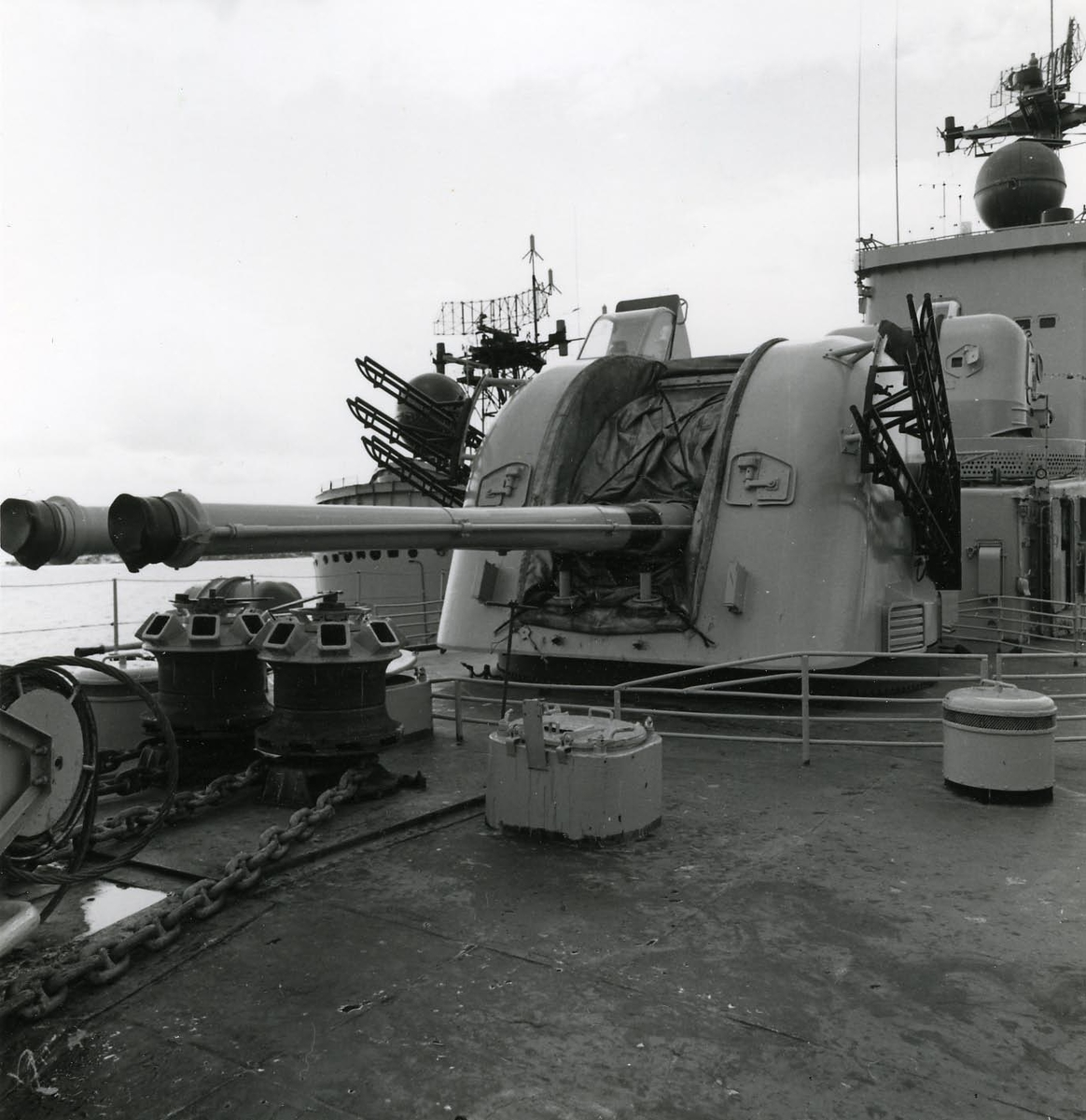
Swedish 12 cm akan m/50 bow-turret on Destroyer HSwMS Småland (J19) 1960's.

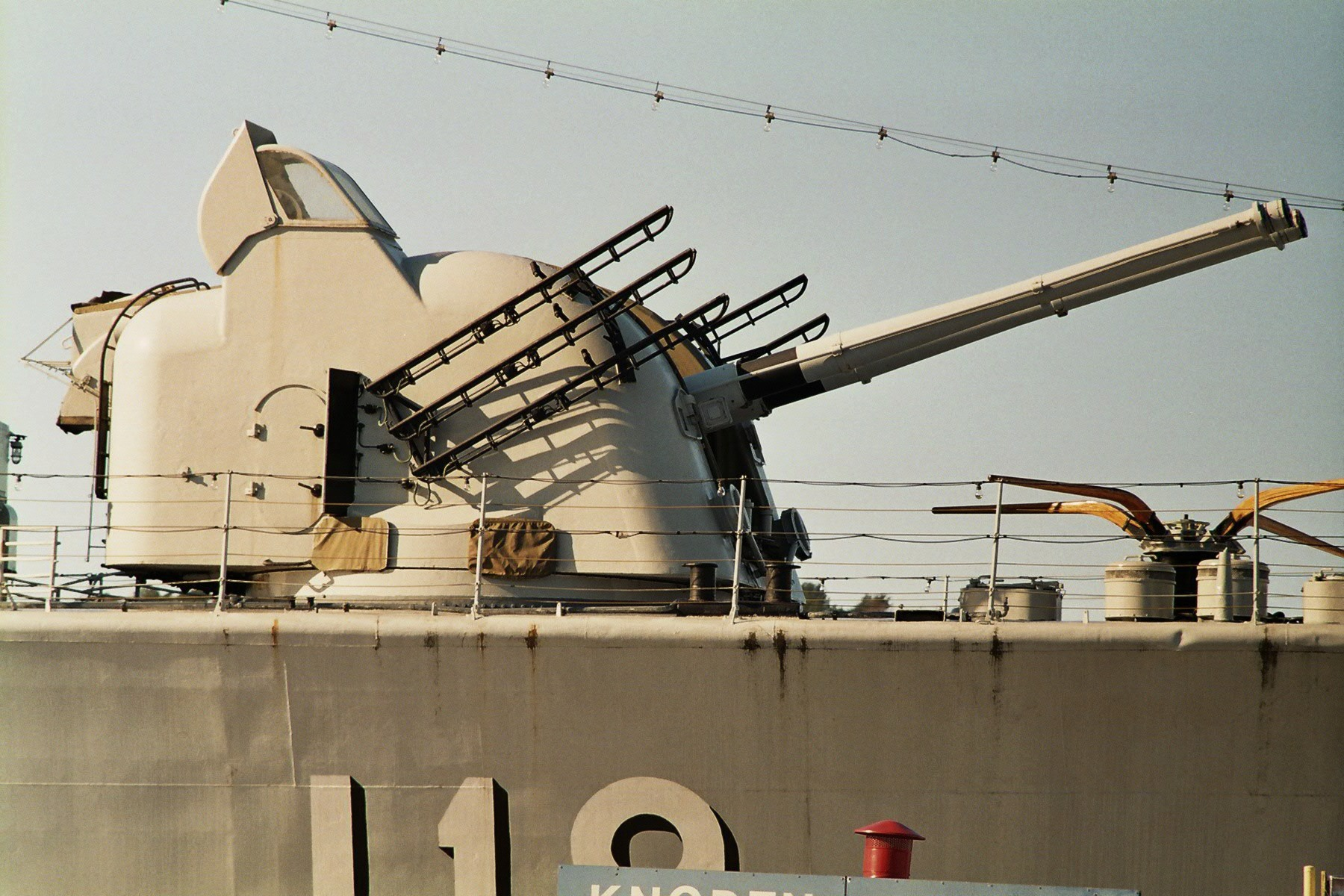
Swedish 12 cm akan m/50 bow-turret on Destroyer HSwMS Småland (J19) 2010.

== Use in the Colombian Navy ==
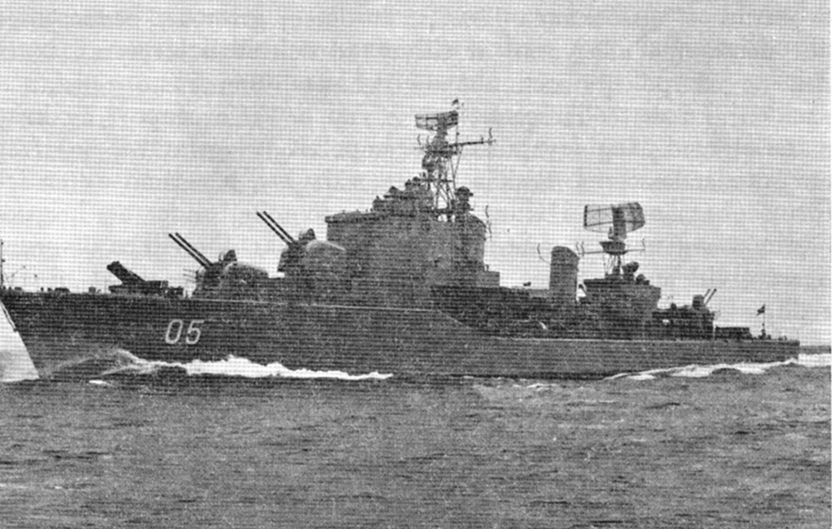
Swedish built Colombian Halland-class destroyer ARC 20 de Julio (D-05) fitted with three Bofors 120 mm Naval Automatic Gun L/50 turrets.

In Colombian service the Bofors 120 mm Naval Automatic Gun L/50 was fitted to the destroyers 7 de Agosto (D-06) and 20 de Julio (D-05), both of which were Swedish built Halland-class destroyers. Unlike the Swedish Halland-class destroyers, the Colombian version carried three Bofors 120 mm Naval Automatic Gun L/50 turrets instead of two.

== See also ==
- Bofors 57 mm Naval Automatic Gun L/60
- Bofors 120 mm Automatic Gun L/46

== Notes ==
=== Bibliography ===
- Borgenstam Insulander Kaudern; "Jagare". Karlskona 1989. CB Marinlitteratur. ISBN 91-970700-41
- 12 cm luftvärnsautomatkanon m/50 tekniskt beskrivning fastställd 1951. (12 cm anti air autocannon m/50 technical description established 1951) booklet.
