= ARC 7 de Agosto (D-06) =

1956 Halland-class destroyer

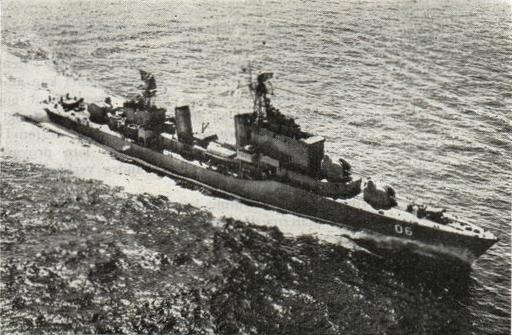
- 7 de Agosto

History

Colombia
- Name: 7 de Agosto
- Builder: Gotaverken
- Laid down: November 1955
- Launched: 19 June 1956
- Completed: 31 October 1958
- Commissioned: 1958
- Decommissioned: 1984
- Identification: Pennant number: D-06
- Fate: Scrapped, 1984

General characteristics
- Class & type: 20 de Julio-class destroyer
- Displacement: 2,650 tons standard; 3,300 tons full load
- Length: 121 m (397 ft 0 in)
- Beam: 12.4 m (40 ft 8 in)
- Draft: 4.7 m (15 ft 5 in)
- Propulsion: 2 shaft geared turbines, 2 boilers, 55,000 hp (41,000 kW)
- Speed: 32 kn (59 km/h)
- Range: 3,000 nmi (6,000 km) at 20 knots (37 km/h); 445 nmi (824 km) at 35 knots (65 km/h)
- Complement: 248
- Armament: 6 × Bofors 120 mm guns (3 × 2); 4 × Bofors 40 mm AA guns (4 × 1); 4 × 533 mm (21.0 in) torpedo tubes (1 × 4); 4 × Bofors 375 mm (14.8 in) anti-submarine rockets (1 × 4)

ARC 7 de Agosto (D-06) was a Swedish-built destroyer of the Colombian Navy. The ship, laid down in November 1955 as 13 de Junio, was built by the firm Götaverken in Gothenburg to the same design as the Royal Swedish Navy's Halland class of destroyers, with the exception that they had a third 120 mm turret in place of the 57 mm AA turret. The ship was launched on 19 June 1956 and completed on 31 October 1958. After a career that spanned almost 30 years, the ship was scrapped in 1984.

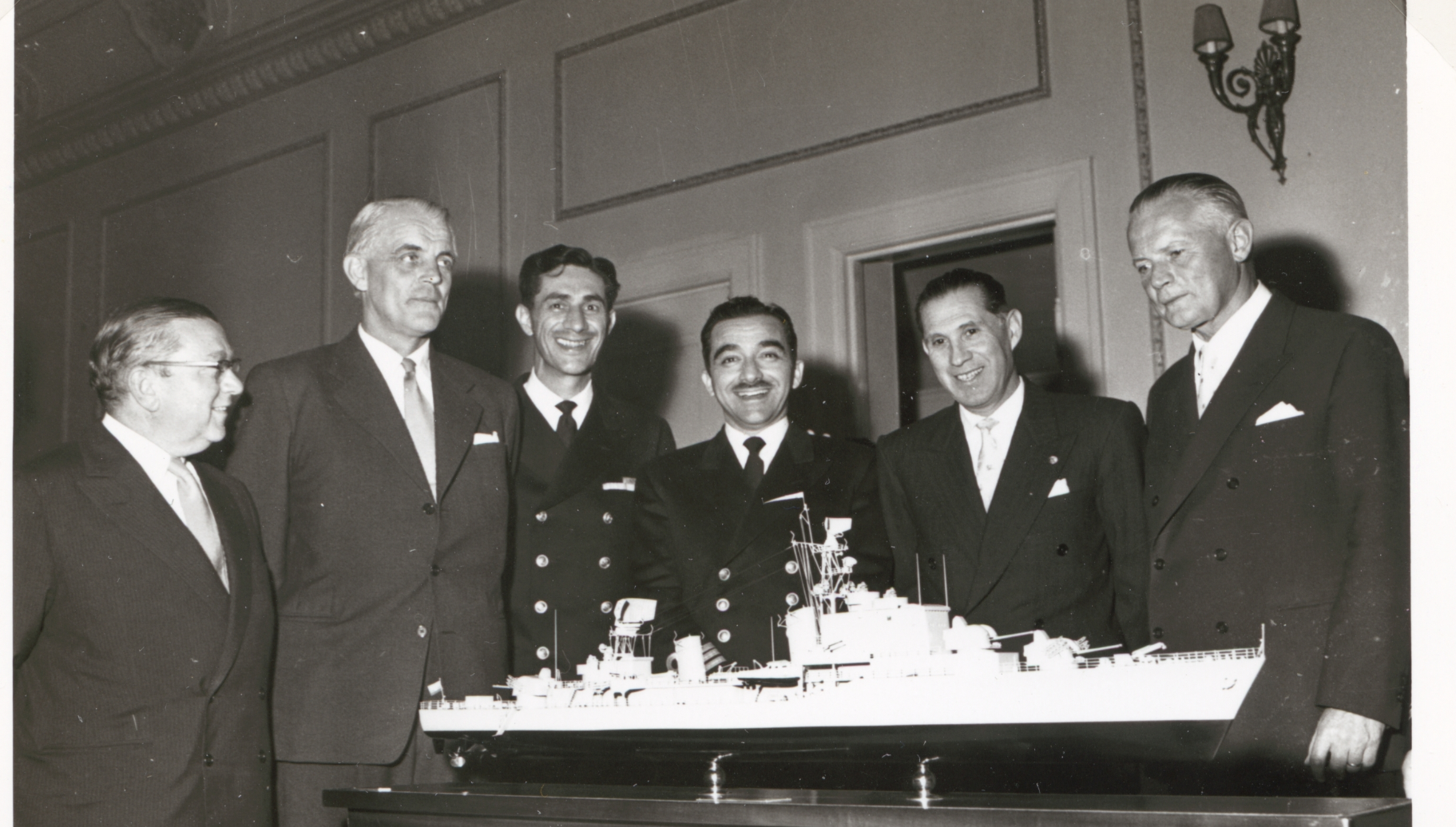
Lunch during flag shifting for the Colombian destroyer ARC 13 de Julio from Sweden to Colombia

== Bibliography ==
- Scheina, Robert L. & Smigielski, Adam (1995). "Columbia". In Chumbley, Stephen (ed.). Conway's All the World's Fighting Ships, 1947–1995 (revised ed.). Naval Institute Press. pp. 68–70. ISBN 1-55750-132-7.
