= HSwMS Halland (J18) =

Swedish destroyer

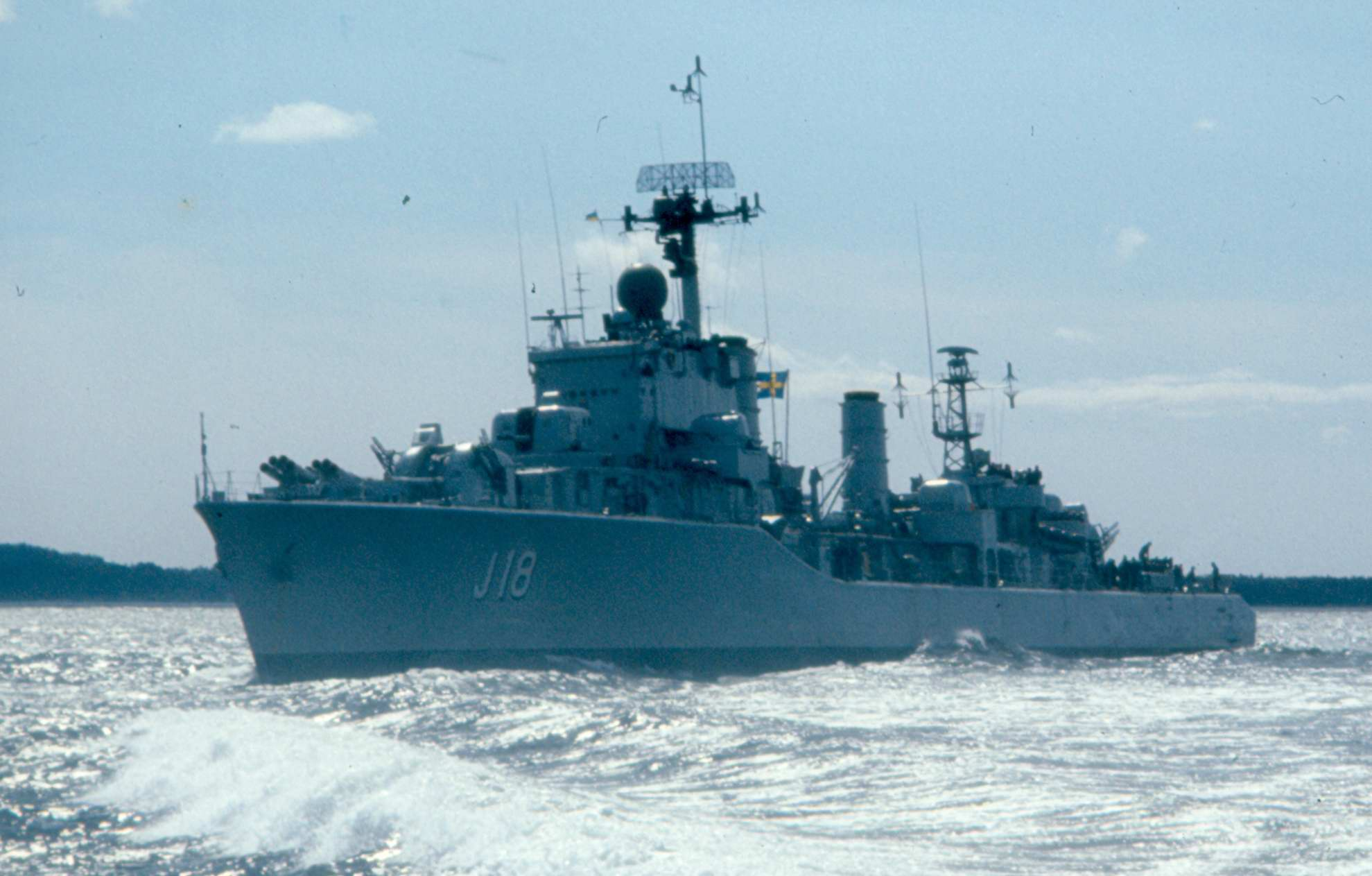
- HMS Halland seen in 1980

History

Sweden
- Name: Halland
- Namesake: Halland
- Builder: Götaverken
- Laid down: 1951
- Launched: 16 July 1952
- Completed: 8 June 1955
- Commissioned: 12 January 1956
- Decommissioned: 1982
- Out of service: 30 June 1987
- Identification: Pennant number: J18
- Fate: Scrapped, 1988
- Badge

General characteristics
- Class & type: Halland-class destroyer
- Displacement: 2,670 t (2,630 long tons) standard; 3,344 t (3,291 long tons) full load
- Length: 121.6 m (398 ft 11 in)
- Beam: 12.1 m (39 ft 8 in)
- Draft: 4.24 m (13 ft 11 in)
- Propulsion: 2 shaft geared turbines, 2 boilers, 58,000 hp (43,000 kW)
- Speed: 37 kn (69 km/h; 43 mph)
- Range: 3,000 nmi (5,600 km; 3,500 mi) at 20 knots (37 km/h; 23 mph); 445 nmi (824 km; 512 mi) at 35 knots (65 km/h; 40 mph)
- Complement: 272 (peacetime)
- Sensors & processing systems: Radar Scanter 009; Thomson-CSF Saturn; HSA M22
- Armament: 2 × dual Bofors 120 mm guns; 1 × dual Bofors 57 mm L/70 naval artillery guns; 6 × single Bofors 40 mm guns; 1 × quin 533 mm (21.0 in) torpedo tubes; 1 × triple 533 mm (21.0 in) torpedo tubes; Torped 613; 2 × single launch rails; Saab Robot 08 anti-ship missiles; 2 × quad Bofors 375mm anti submarine rockets

HSwMS Halland (J18) was the lead ship of the Halland-class destroyer. She and HSwMS Småland were the only ones built of their class. Two more ships were ordered but they were never completed.

Halland carried out submarine hunting on a couple of occasions, including at Hasslö and Utö in 1980. She was used for two years as a long-haul vessel as a replacement for HSwMS Älvsnabben (M01) before HSwMS Carlskrona (M04) started. However, the trips had to be made short as her operating costs were high. It was decommissioned on June 30, 1987, and sold the following year for scrapping in Spain. A model of Halland in scale 1:50 has been exhibited at the Maritime History Museum and Marine Museum in Karlskrona.

== Design ==
Halland was 121 meters long and 12.6 meters wide. The hull was designed with a forecastle. From the forecastle and astern, a long superstructure appeared, which made it possible for the crew to reach the entire ship without having to go outdoors, thus minimizing the risk of exposure to radioactive contamination. Unlike previous destroyer classes, whose superstructures was built of aluminum, the Halland-class was built of steel. Aluminum gave ships a lower weight but had the disadvantage in a case of fire, when it melts at a much lower temperature than steel. To keep the weight down, therefore, corrugated galvanised iron was used in the superstructure.

The machinery consisted of steam boilers and steam turbine are. Two Penhoët boilers delivered steam with a pressure of 40 bar and the temperature of 420 degrees to two de Laval turbines. The effect was a total of 58,000 horsepower, which gave the ship a maximum speed of 35 knots (65 km/h).

The main armament consisted of two fully automatic double Bofors 120 mm gun model 1950 which were initially directed from a central sight which was later replaced by a new artillery radar sight connected to the radar. The secondary armament consisted of a double Bofors 57 mm anti-aircraft gun model 1950 and six single Bofors 40 mm L/70. The former was initially controlled from a central sight on the bridge and later by a digital fire control housed in the characteristic radome over the bridge deck. The torpedo armament consisted of two tube racks with a total of eight torpedo tubes. Regarding anti-submarine warfare, there was a hydrophone housed in a dome under the forebody which could be retracted into the hull when the hydrophone was not used. When a submarine was discovered, eight Bofors 375 mm rocket launchers each with a 100 kg charge and a range of 300 - 1,200 meters could be fired in a pattern around, above and below the target from two directable four-barrelled launchers. In the stern there was also a mounting with two launchrails for firing the Robot 08 anti-ship missile.

== History ==
Halland was built at Götaverken in Gothenburg and was launched on 16 July 1952 when she was christened by Prince Bertil, Duke of Halland. After extensive work on equipment and installation of all components, the ship was delivered to the Swedish Navy on 12 January 1956.

During the first period, Halland together with the sister ship Småland formed a fighting division. When the cruisers HSwMS Tre Kronor and HSwMS Göta Lejon were scrapped in the early 1970s, the Halland class' ships were the largest and most powerful ships in the Swedish fleet, and later they became leading ships for their respective fighter flotillas.

Halland was disarmed in 1982 and put into mothball until she was stricken on 30 June 1987. In 1988, she was sold for scrapping in Spain.

== Gallery ==
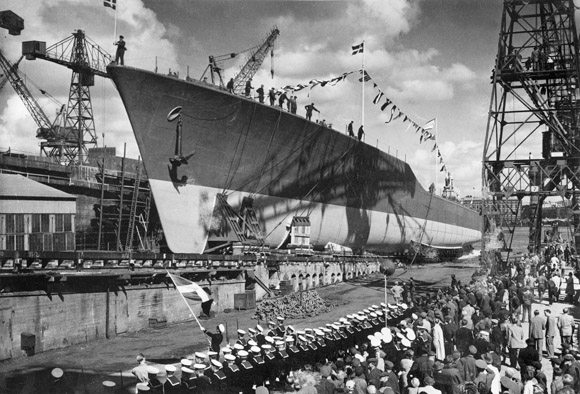
HSwMS Halland on 16 July 1952

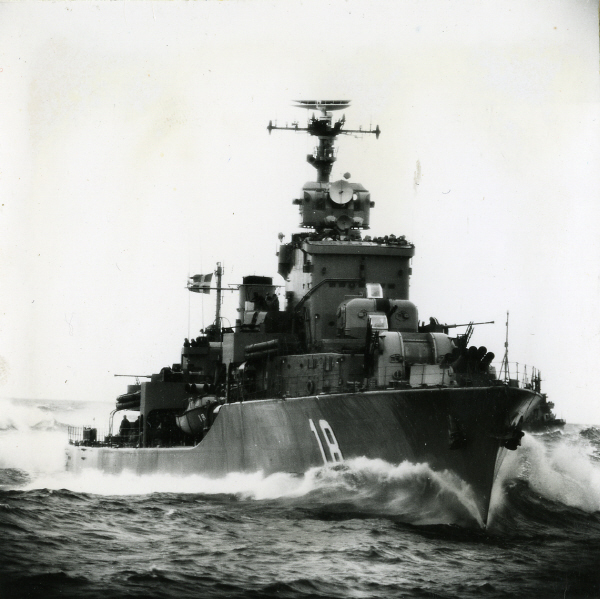
HSwMS Halland in 1957

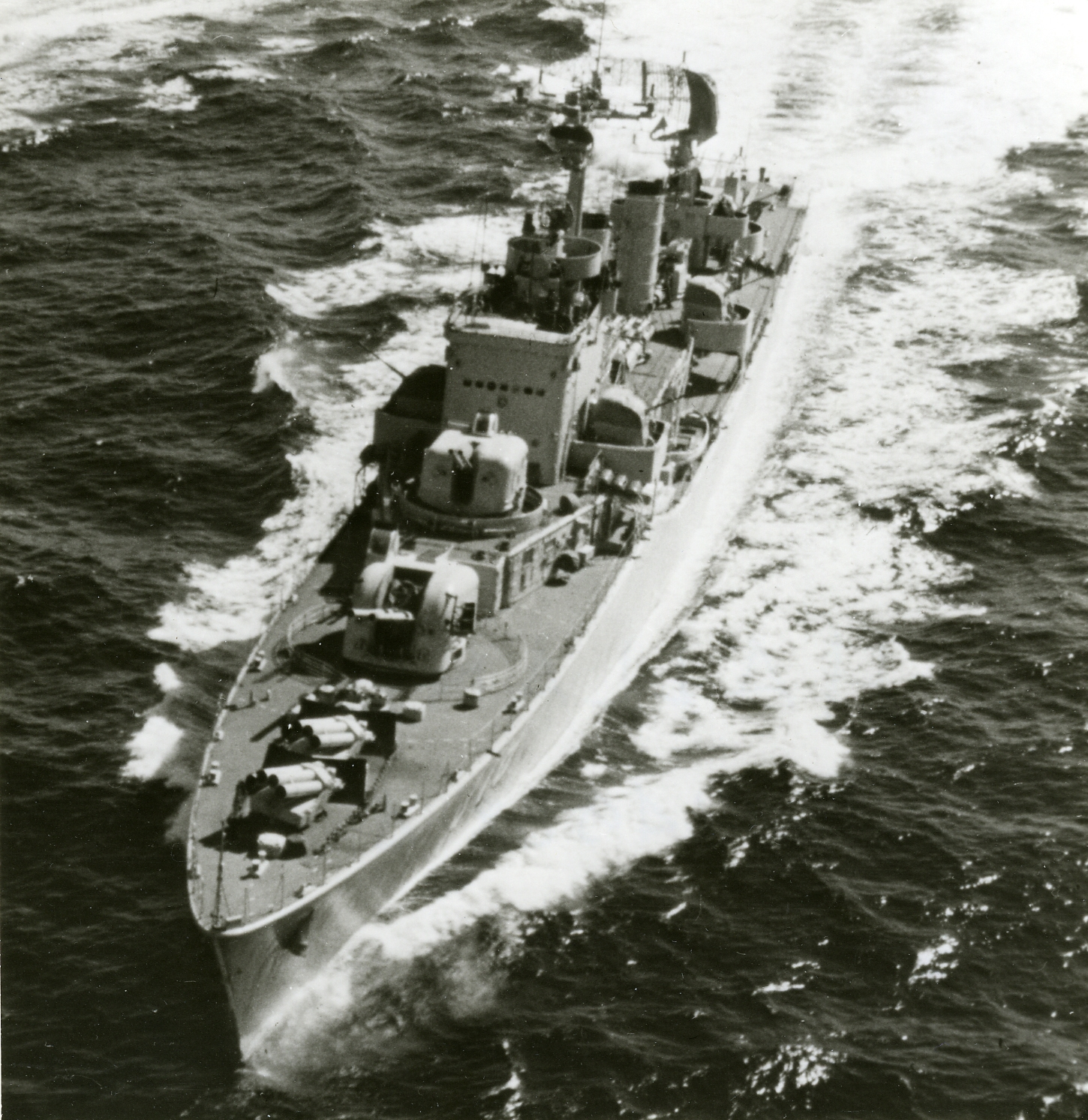
HSwMS Halland in 1966

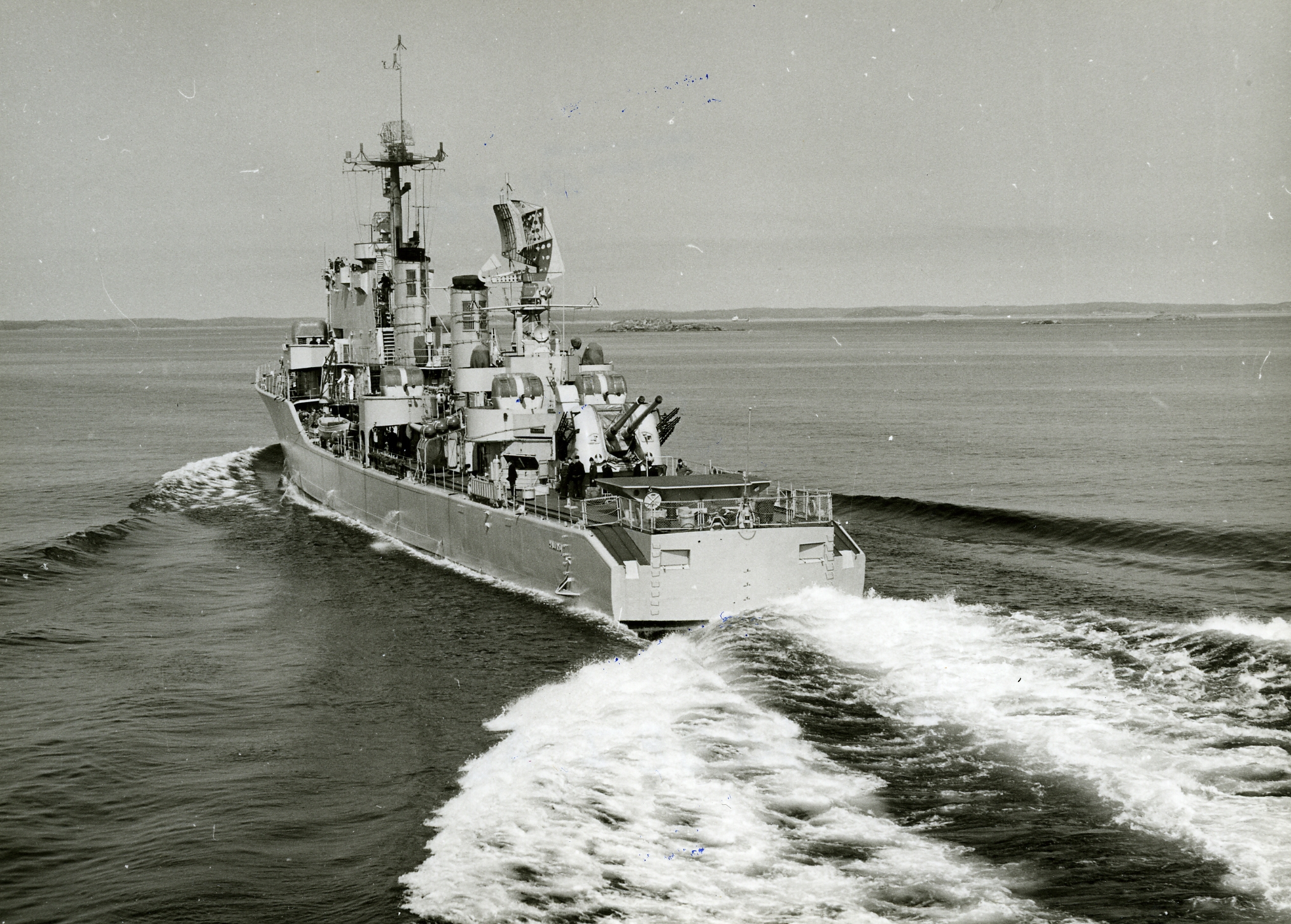

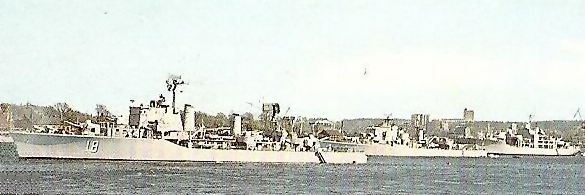
HSwMS Halland in 1968

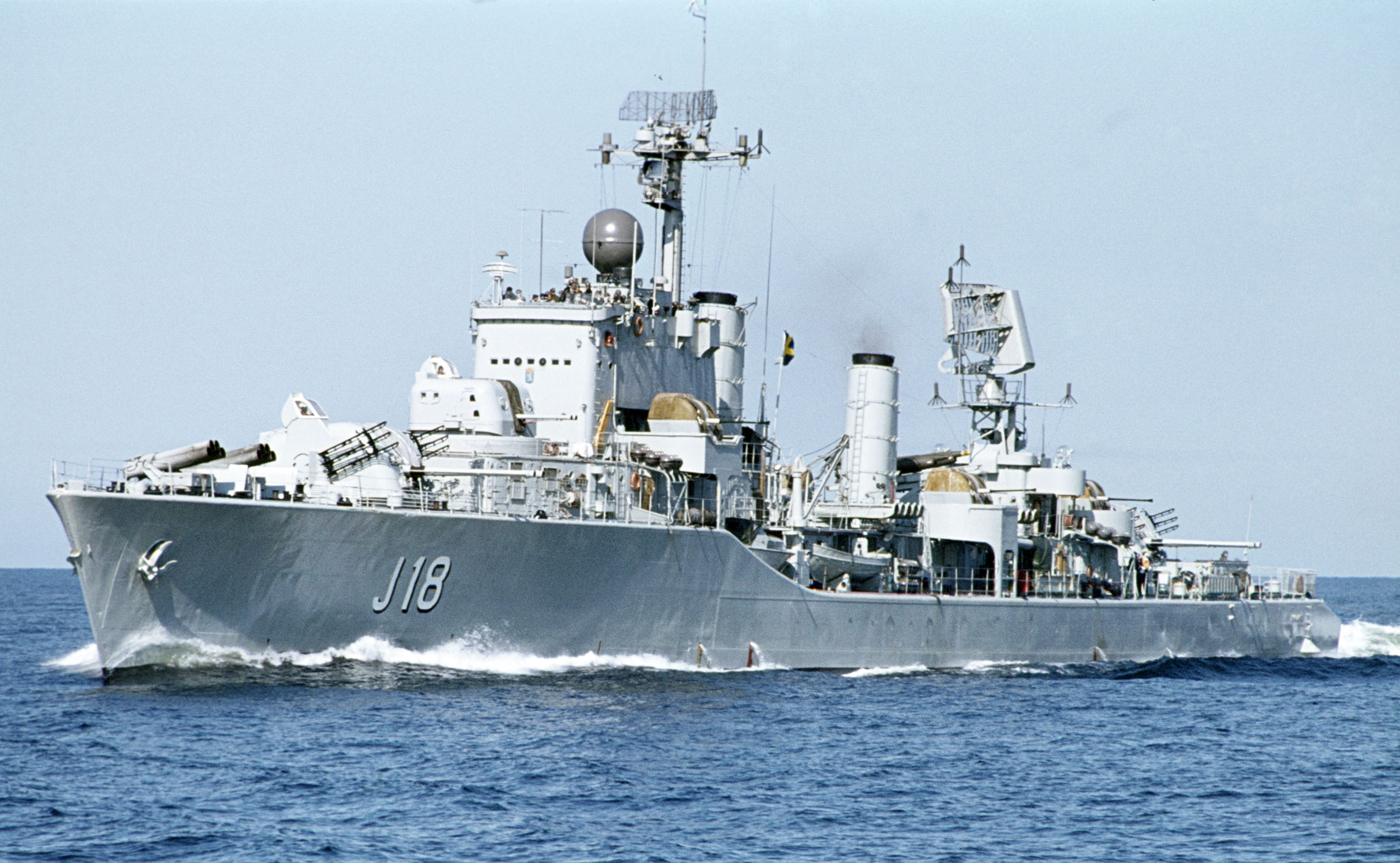
HSwMS Halland in 1972

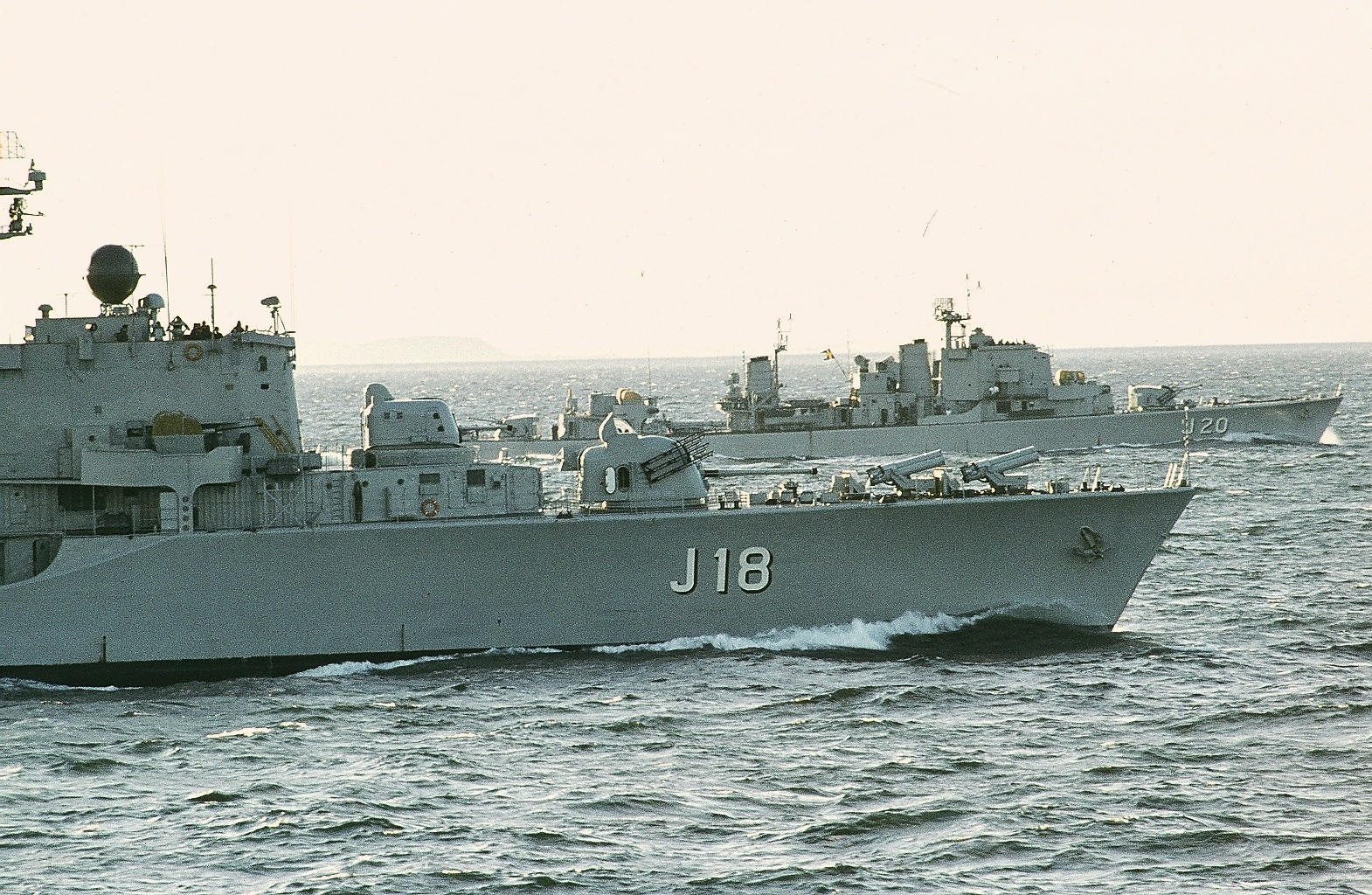
HSwMS Halland in 1972

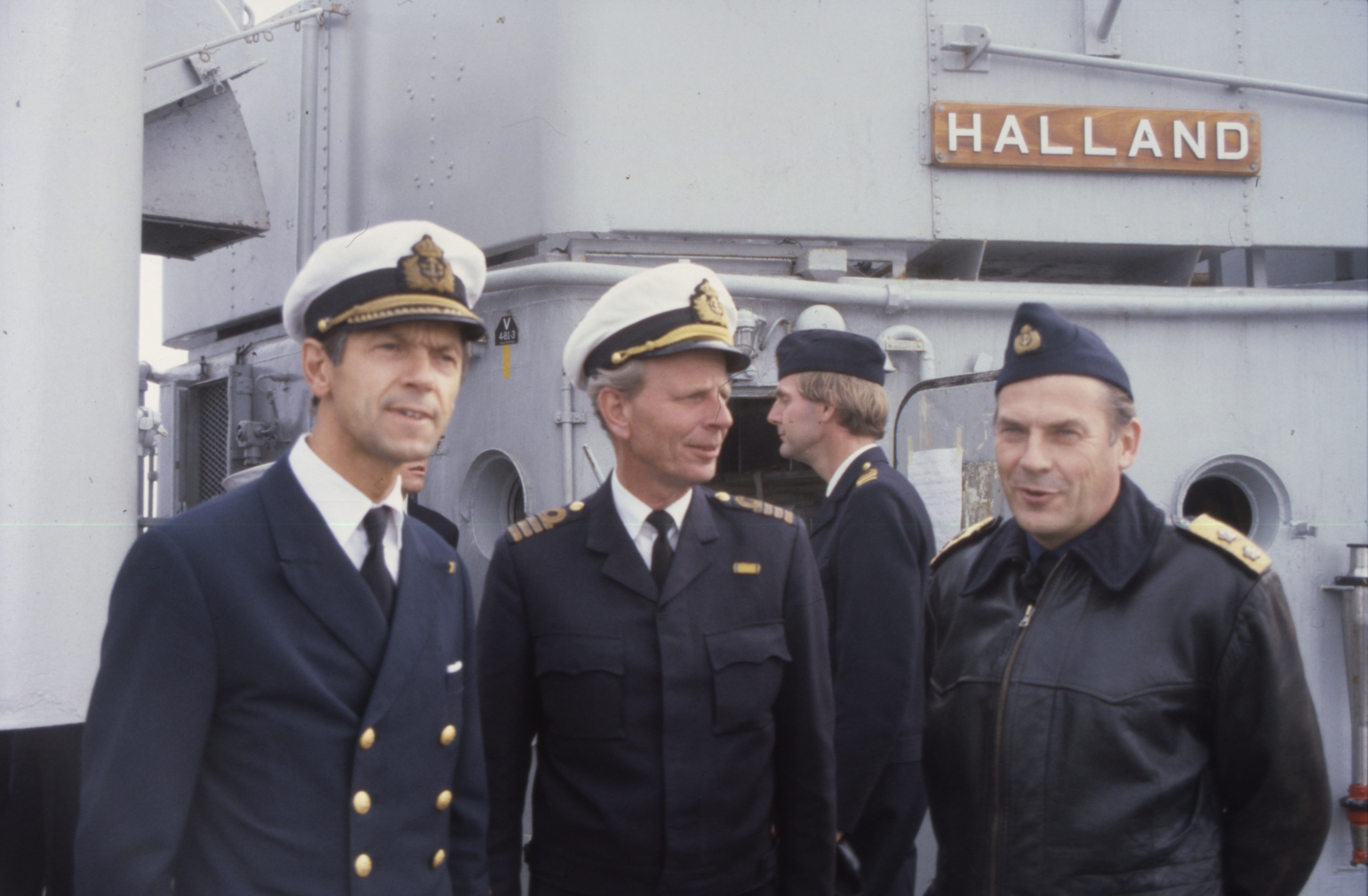
HSwMS Halland in 1982
