= Nord Aviation CT20 =

French target drone

CT20
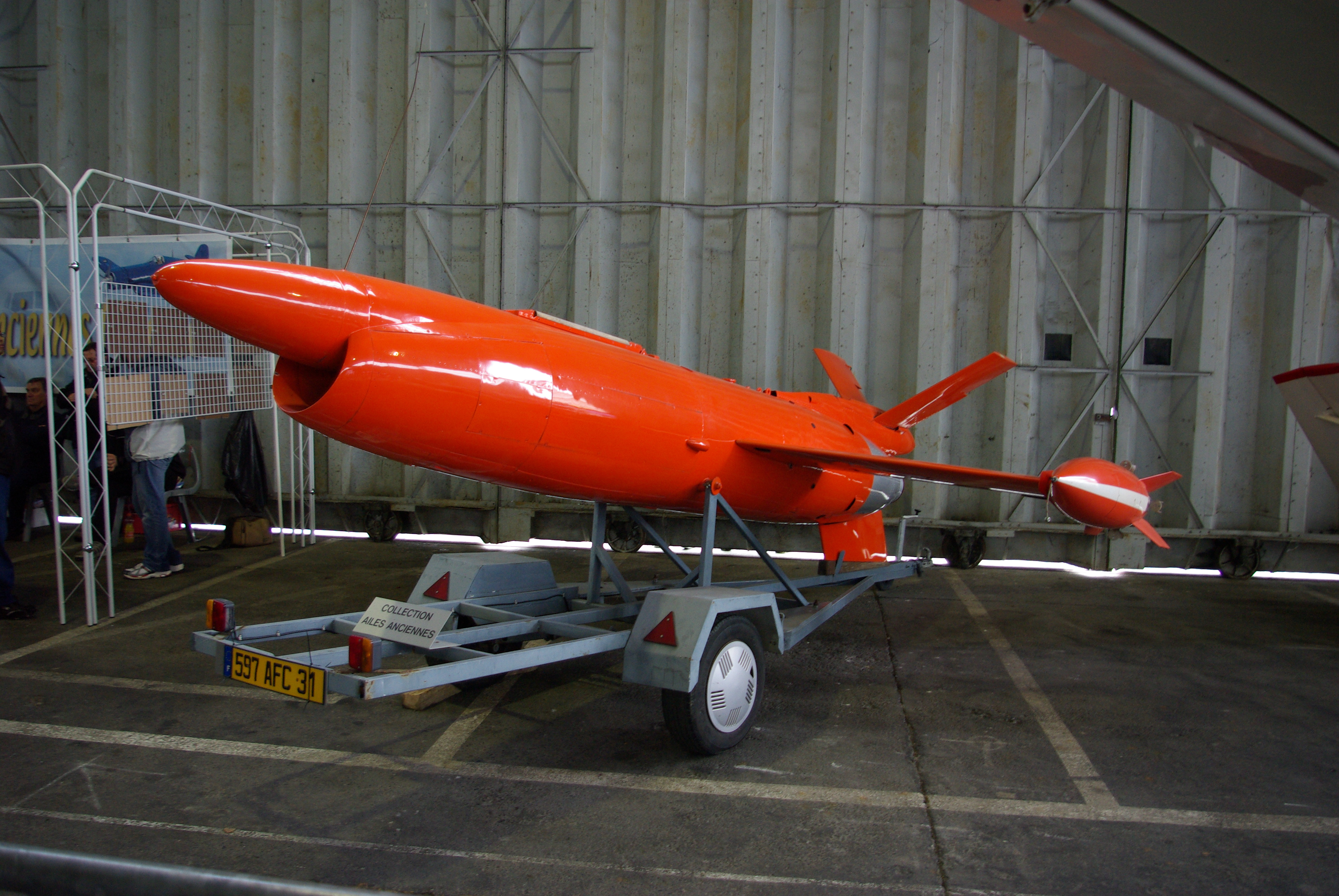
- A CT20 restored by the Musée des ailes anciennes in Toulouse, France

General information
- Type: Unmanned drone
- Manufacturer: Nord Aviation

History
- Introduction date: 1957

The Nord Aviation CT20 was a French turbojet-powered radio-controlled target drone introduced in 1957. Developed from the Arsenal / S.F.E.C.M.A.S. T.5.510, the CT.20 was built by Nord Aviation and powered by a Turbomeca Marboré II engine, providing a top speed of 900 km/h (560 mph; 490 kn) and a flying time of 55 to 60 minutes. It has been noted for its similarity to the Ryan Firebee. The unmanned drone was used in the development of air-to-air missiles following the Second World War.

After the startup of the turbojet, the target drone is placed on a ramp and launched using two rockets. During its flight, the drone is controlled via radio signals from the ground. As it is made of light material, it is buoyant in water and can be recovered if it is forced to land on water.

== Variants ==
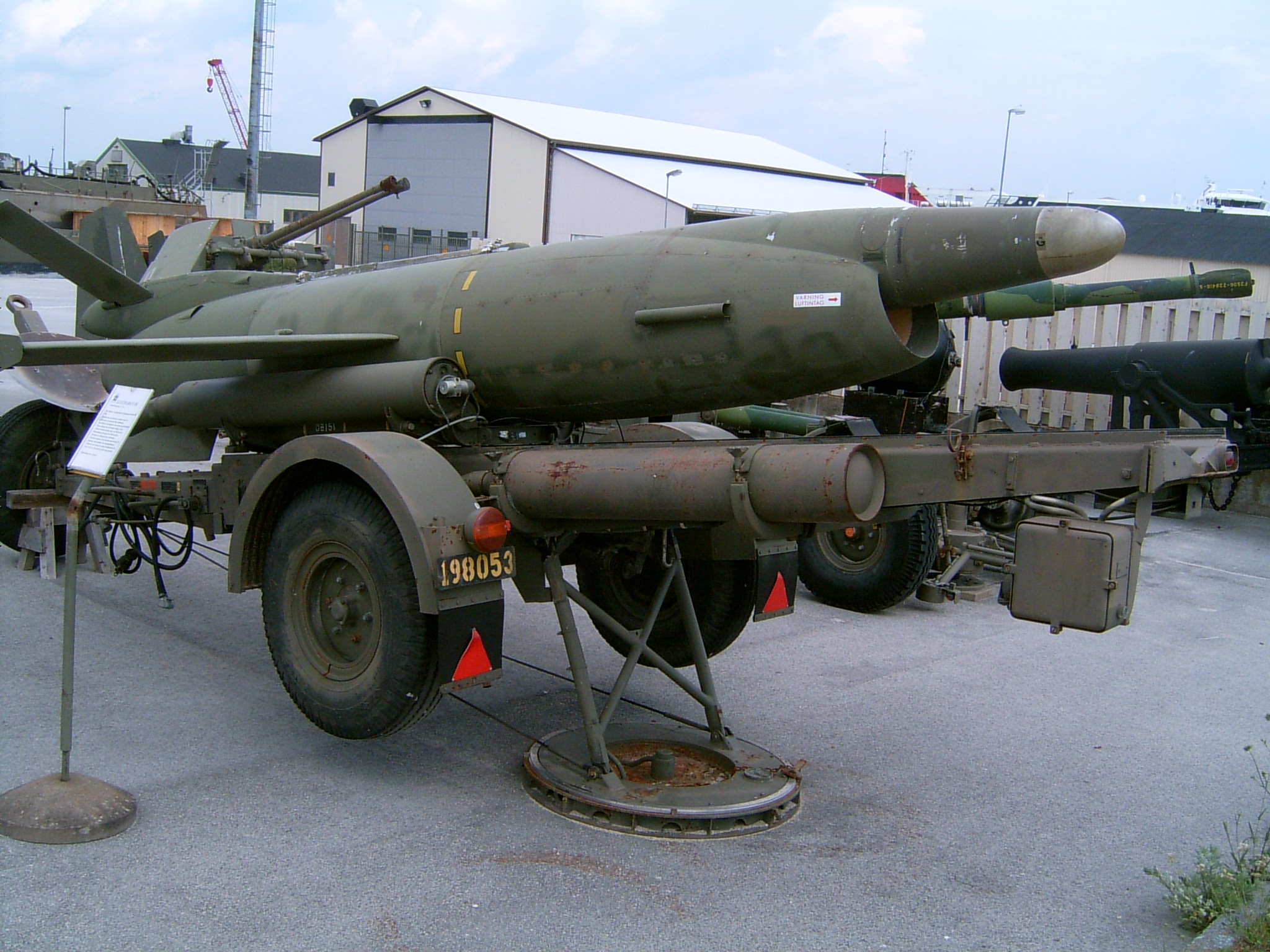
Swedish coastal missile Robot 08 (Kustrobot 08) at the museum at Gotland Coastal Artillery Regiment (KA 3) in Fårösund, Sweden.

Arsenal T.5.510 / S.F.E.C.M.A.S. T.5.510
Original design work and development of the CT.20 carried out before SFECMAS was absorbed by SNCAN.
CT20
Radio controlled target
R20
Battlefield reconnaissance drone. 62 built for French Army.
Saab Rb 08
Anti-ship missile (AShM) version of CT20 for Royal Swedish Navy. 68 built.

== Operators ==
France

- French Army

Sweden

- Royal Swedish Navy

== Specifications (CT.20) ==
Data from Jane's All The World's Aircraft 1976–77, Aviation Week & Space Technology : CT-20 Target Drone Main Characteristics

General characteristics

- Crew: 0
- Length: 5.45 m (17 ft 11 in)
- Wingspan: 3.16 m (10 ft 4 in)
- Wing area: 3.20 m^{2} (34.4 sq ft)
- Empty weight: 490 kg (1,080 lb)
- Max takeoff weight: 660 kg (1,455 lb)
- Powerplant: 1 × Turbomeca Marboré II turbojet, 3.92 kN (880 lbf) thrust

Performance

- Maximum speed: 900 km/h (560 mph, 490 kn) at 10,000 m (33,000 ft)
- Maximum speed: Mach 0.85
- Endurance: 55 minutes
- Service ceiling: 12,000 m (39,000 ft)
- Time to altitude: 10,000 m (33,000 ft) in 5 minutes

== See also ==
- KS-1 Komet
- KSShch
- P-15 Termit, P-5/35/45/6 Pyatyorka Redut Sepal URSS
