= Saab Rb 08 =

Rb 08
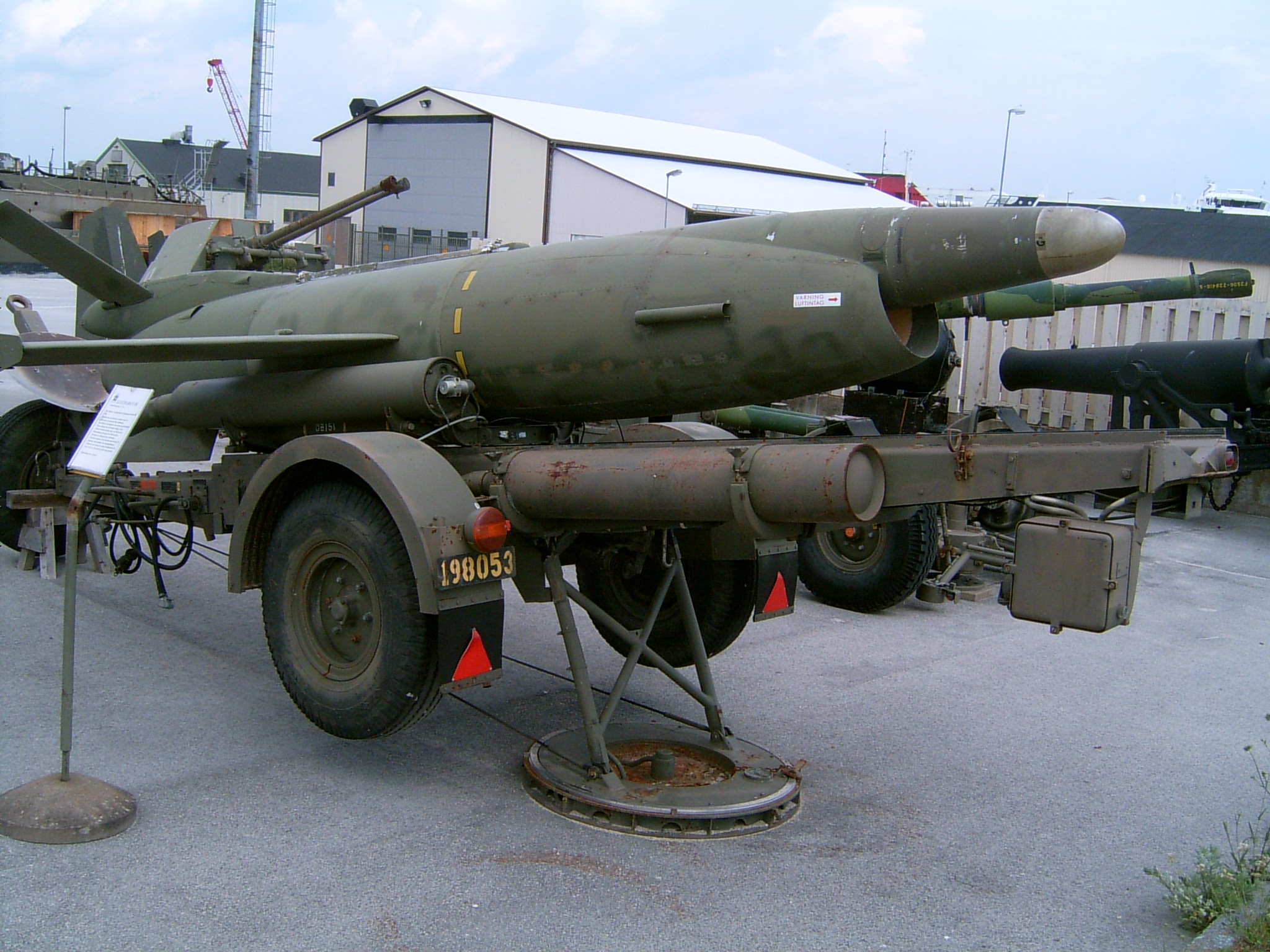
- Type: Anti-ship missile
- Place of origin: Sweden

Service history
- In service: 1966-1995

Production history
- Manufacturer: Saab

Specifications
- Mass: 900 kg (2,000 lb) (missile); 315 kg (694 lb) (launch rockets)
- Length: 5.72 m (18.8 ft)
- Diameter: 0.66 m (2 ft 2 in)
- Wingspan: 3.01 m (9.9 ft)
- Warhead: High Explosive
- Warhead weight: 250 kg (551 lb)
- Detonation mechanism: contact fuze
- Engine: Turbomeca Marboré turbojet
- Operational range: 70 km (43 mi)
- Maximum speed: 900 km/h (560 mph)
- Guidance system: radio command (initial); Active radar homing (terminal)
- Launch platform: Halland-class destroyer

Robot 08 (Rb 08) was an anti-ship missile developed in Sweden by Saab during the early Cold War. It was the first operational ship-based anti-ship missile. The design was a development of the French Nord Aviation CT20 target missile and was manufactured by Saab. The project to develop the weapon was initiated in the 1950s and the missile entered sea-going service in 1966 aboard the Halland-class destroyers, later also serving in a land-based coastal defense role with the Swedish Coastal Artillery. Guidance was via radio command and active radar homing. The missile was replaced by the RBS-15, being retired in 1995.

== Development ==
The Royal Swedish Naval Materiel Administration experimented in the 1950s with the development of an anti-ship missile, with the project name M20. Disputes with the Air Force Materiel Administration over responsibility for missile development prolonged the development. Therefore, in 1962 the Naval Materiel Administration directed Saab to develop an anti-ship version of Nord Aviation's CT20 target missile. Saab worked with the French company on the development, with the missile, engine and some of the sensors developed in France and early flight tests taking place at a French launching ground in the Mediterranean Sea. Final production took place in the Nord Aviation factory of Méaulte (Somme) before components were sent to be reassembled in Sweden.

== Design ==
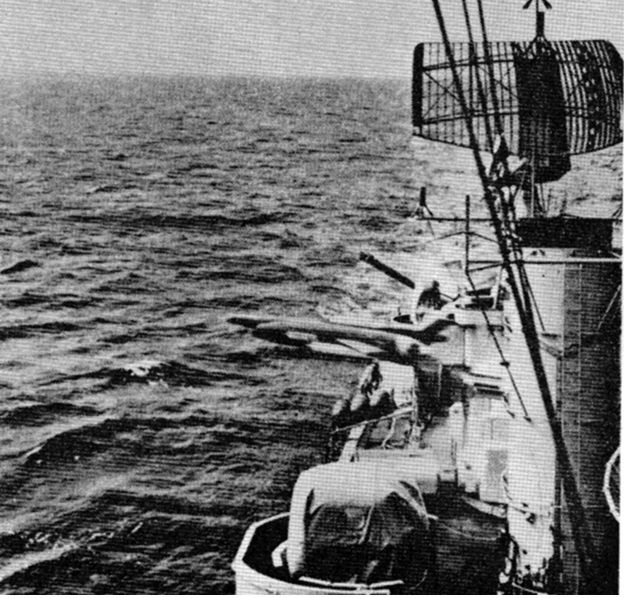
Rb 08 launching from a Halland-class destroyer.

The missile was 5.72 m (18 ft 9 in) long, with a diameter of 0.66 m (2 ft 2 in). Wingspan was 3.01 m (9 ft 11 in) extended and 1.35 m (4 ft 5 in) folded. Height was 1.33 m (4 ft 4 in). The 900 kg (2,000 lb) missile was propelled by a 400 kg (880 lb) Turbomeca Marboré IID jet engine and launched using a pair of rockets mounted on a launch sled, which added another 315 kg (694 lb) to the weight. The rockets released when the missile was airborne, which took about 2 seconds. At takeoff, the missile's speed would be about 500 km/h (310 mph), with a top speed of 900 km/h (560 mph).

The missile was guided by radio command and could be equipped with either cameras for scouting or an explosive warhead. The active radar homing system took control at about 15 km (9.3 mi) from the target, diving into a ship where a contact fuze would detonate the 250 kg (550 lb) High Explosive fragmentation warhead. Maximum range was about 250 km (160 mi).

== Service ==
The Swedish Navy ordered the missile in 1965 at a cost of 86 million kronor. After some test firing, the two Halland-class destroyers were equipped with the Rb 08 in 1966. It was the first operational ship-based anti-ship missile in the western world. The Swedish Coastal Artillery organized a coastal missile battery in 1968 to operate the new weapon. A total of 98 missiles were built, production completing in 1970.

A modernized version with a new seeker, Robot 08B, was planned, but did not come to fruition. Instead, the Rb 08 retired in 1995, replaced by the RBS-15, capable of both surface-to-surface and air-to-surface operation. Several Rb 08 are still preserved for display today.
