= Halland-class destroyer =

Swedish Navy ship class

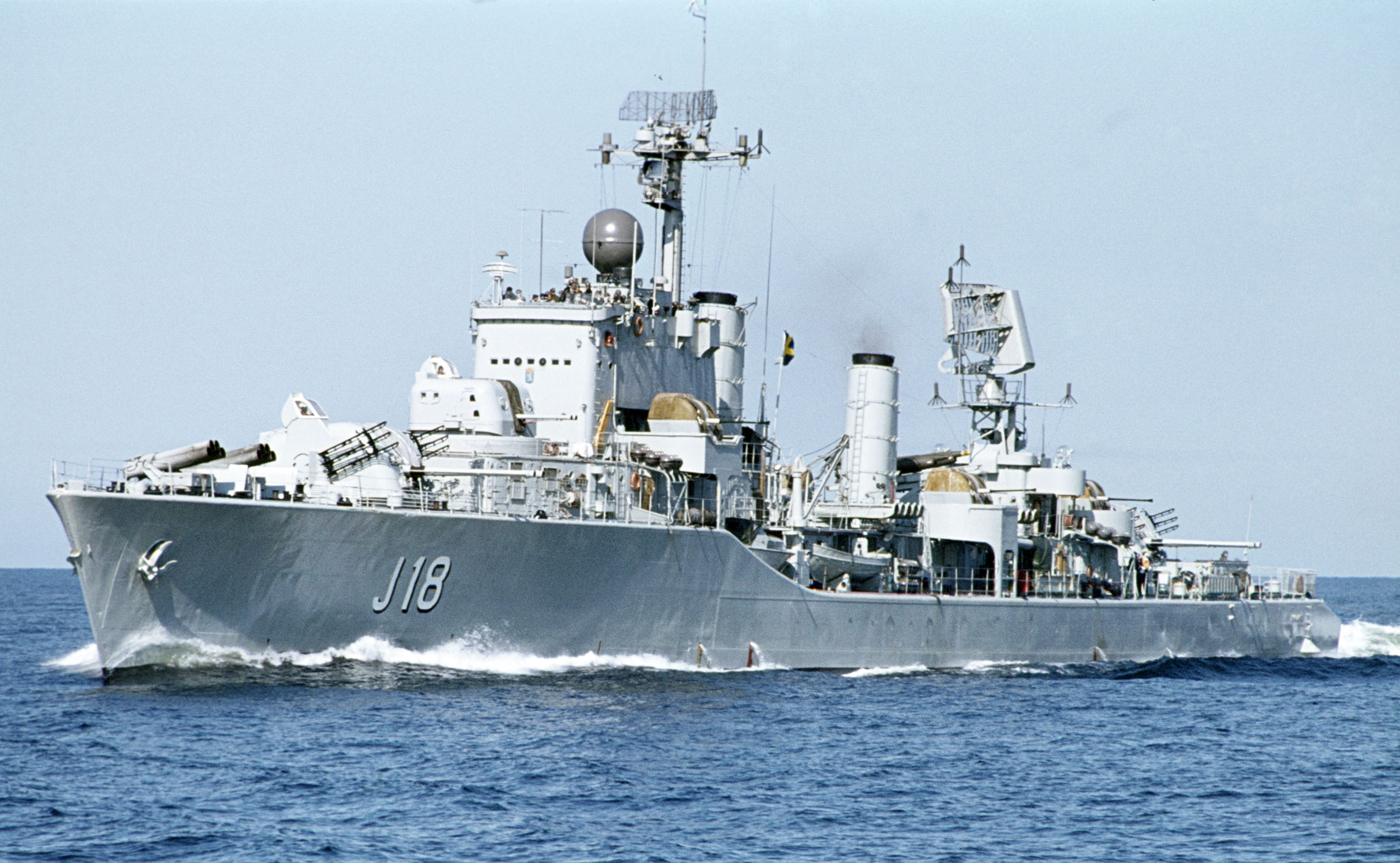
- HSwMS Halland

Class overview
- Name: Halland class
- Operators: Swedish Navy; Colombian National Navy
- Preceded by: Öland class
- Succeeded by: Östergötland class
- In commission: Sweden: 1955–1982; Colombia: 1958–1986
- Planned: 6
- Completed: 4
- Cancelled: 2
- Preserved: 1

General characteristics (Sweden)
- Type: Destroyer
- Displacement: 2,670 t (2,630 long tons) standard; 3,344 t (3,291 long tons) full load
- Length: 121.6 m (398 ft 11 in)
- Beam: 12.1 m (39 ft 8 in)
- Draft: 4.24 m (13 ft 11 in)
- Propulsion: 2 shaft geared turbines, 2 boilers, 58,000 hp (43,000 kW)
- Speed: 35 kn (65 km/h; 40 mph)
- Range: 3,000 nmi (5,600 km; 3,500 mi) at 20 knots (37 km/h; 23 mph); 445 nmi (824 km; 512 mi) at 35 knots (65 km/h; 40 mph)
- Complement: 272 (peacetime)
- Sensors & processing systems: Radar Scanter 009; Thomson-CSFSaturn; HSA M22
- Armament: 4 × Bofors 120 mm (4.7 in) guns M/50 (2 × 2); 2 × Bofors 57 mm (2.2 in) guns m/50 (1 × 2); 6 × Bofors 40 mm (1.6 in) AA guns m/48 (6 × 1); 8 × 533 mm (21.0 in) torpedo tubes (1 × 5 and 1 × 3) for wire-guided Torped 61; 1 or 2 launch rails for Saab Rb 08 anti-ship missiles; 8 × Bofors 375 mm (14.8 in) anti-submarine rockets (2 × 4)

General characteristics (Colombia)
- Displacement: 2,650 tons standard; 3,300 tons full load
- Length: 121 m (397 ft 0 in)
- Beam: 12.4 m (40 ft 8 in)
- Draft: 4.7 m (15 ft 5 in)
- Propulsion: 2 shaft geared turbines, 2 boilers, 55,000 hp (41,000 kW)
- Speed: 32 kn (59 km/h)
- Range: 3,000 nmi (6,000 km) at 20 knots (37 km/h); 445 nmi (824 km) at 35 knots (65 km/h)
- Complement: 248
- Armament: 6 × Bofors 120 mm guns (3 × 2); 4 × Bofors 40 mm AA guns (4 × 1); 4 × 533 mm (21.0 in) torpedo tubes (1 × 4); 4 × Bofors 375 mm (14.8 in) anti-submarine rockets (1 × 4)

The Halland-class destroyers were two ships built for the Swedish Navy in the 1950s. Four ships were planned, but the second pair were canceled. Two modified ships were exported to the Colombian Navy. These vessels were general purpose surface combatants.

== Design ==
These were general purpose ships with strong anti-submarine and anti-surface warfare armament. They were re-fitted in the 1960s and re-armed with Saab Rb 08 anti-ship missiles (a missile derivative of the Nord Aviation CT20 drone). The Colombian ships had a more anti-surface focused armament.

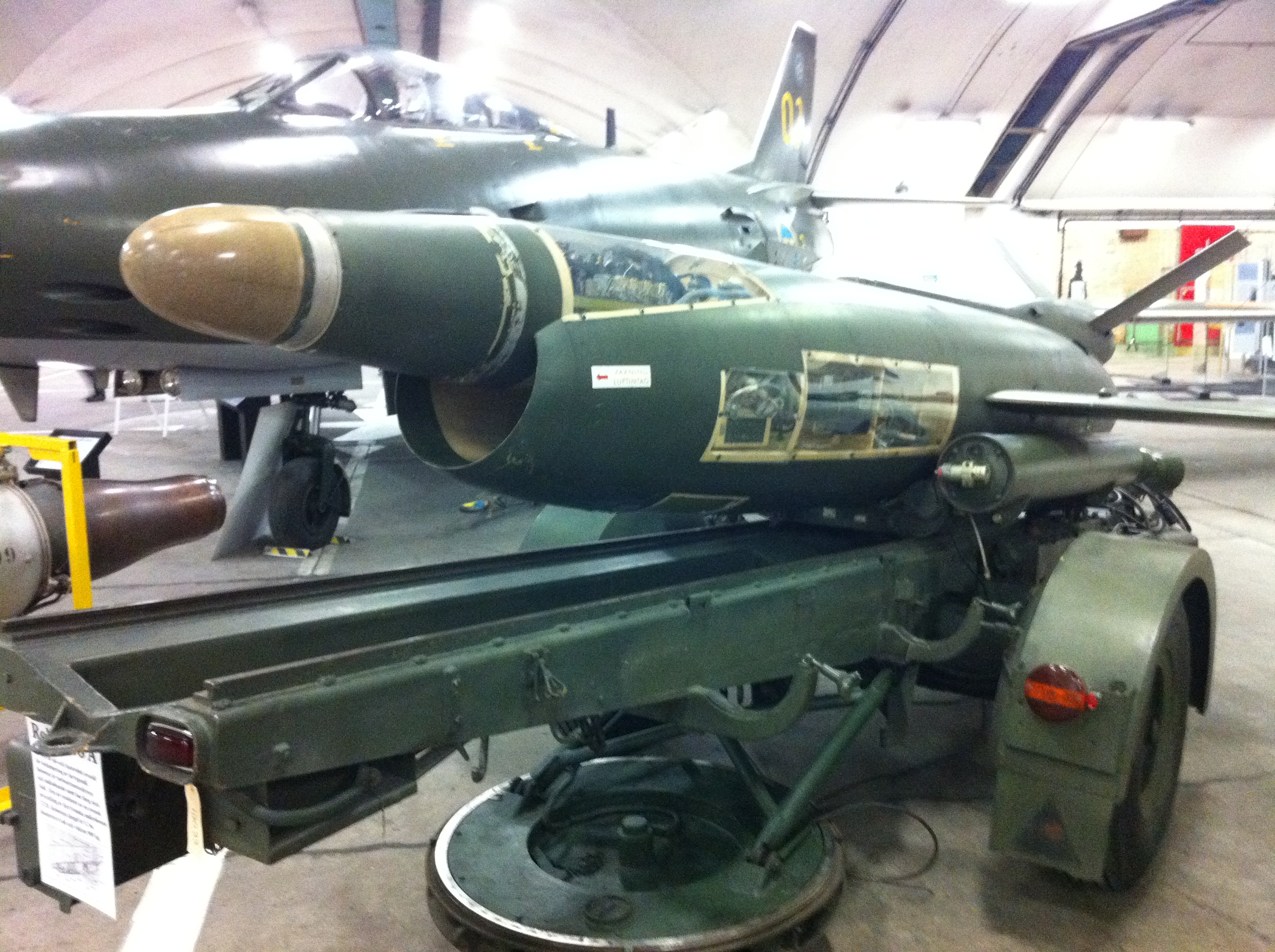
Robot 08

== Ships ==
=== Swedish Navy ===
- HSwMS Halland (J18), built by Götaverken, Gothenburg. Commissioned 1955. Decommissioned 1982, scrapped 1985.
- HSwMS Småland (J19), built by Eriksberg, Gothenburg. Commissioned 1956. Decommissioned 1979, now a museum ship in Gothenburg.
- HSwMS Lappland, cancelled 1958.
- HSwMS Värmland, cancelled 1958.

=== Colombian Navy ===
- 7 de Agosto (D-06) (ex-Trece de Junio) (D 06), built by Götaverken, Gothenburg. Commissioned 1958. Decommissioned 1986, scrapped.
- 20 de Julio (D-05), built by Eriksberg, Gothenburg. Commissioned 1958. Decommissioned 1986, scrapped.

== See also ==
- List of destroyers of the Swedish Navy

Equivalent destroyers of the same era

- T 47 class
- Daring class
- Akizuki class
- Friesland class
- Impetuoso class
- Forrest Sherman class
- Kotlin class
- Hamburg class

== Bibliography ==
- Scheina, Robert L. & Smigielski, Adam (1995). "Columbia". In Chumbley, Stephen (ed.). Conway's All the World's Fighting Ships, 1947–1995 (revised ed.). Naval Institute Press. pp. 68–70. ISBN 1-55750-132-7.
- Westerlund, Karl-Eric & Chumbley, Stephen (1995). "Columbia". In Chumbley, Stephen (ed.). Conway's All the World's Fighting Ships, 1947–1995 (revised ed.). Naval Institute Press. pp. 443–453. ISBN 1-55750-132-7.
