= List of frigates of the Netherlands =

This is a list of frigates of the Netherlands Navy.

- Van Speijk class
  - Van Speijk
  - Van Galen
  - Tjerk Hiddes
  - Van Nes
  - Isaac Sweers
  - Evertsen
- Tromp class
  - Tromp
  - De Ruyter
- Kortenaer class
  - Kortenaer
  - Callenburgh
  - Van Kinsbergen
  - Banckert
  - Piet Hein
  - Pieter Florisz sold before commissioning to Greece see Elli
  - Witte de With sold before commissioning to Greece see Limnos
  - Abraham Crijnssen
  - Philips van Almonde
  - Bloys van Treslong
  - Jan van Brakel
  - Willem van der Zaan / Pieter Florisz
- Jacob van Heemskerck class
  - Jacob van Heemskerck
  - Witte de With
- Karel Doorman class
  - Karel Doorman
  - Van Speijk
  - Willem van der Zaan
  - Tjerk Hiddes
  - Van Amstel
  - Abraham van der Hulst
  - Van Nes
  - Van Galen
- De Zeven Provinciën class
  - De Zeven Provinciën
  - Tromp
  - De Ruyter
  - Evertsen

== Bibliography ==
- Jordan, John (1995). "Netherlands". In Chumbley, Stephen (ed.). Conway's All The World's Fighting Ships 1947–1995. Annapolis, Maryland: Naval Institute Press. pp. 269–283. ISBN 1-55750-132-7.
