= List of ship commissionings in 1995 =

The list of ship commissionings in 1995 includes a chronological list of all ships commissioned in 1995.

	Operator	Ship	Flag	Class and type	Pennant	Other notes
2 January	Royal Navy	Victorious		Vanguard-class submarine	S29	
7 January	United States Navy	Harpers Ferry		Harpers Ferry-class dock landing ship	LSD-49	
21 January	United States Navy	Rainier		Supply-class fast combat support ship	T-AOE-7	
18 March	United States Navy	Laboon		Arleigh Burke-class destroyer	DDG-58	
20 May	United States Navy	Russell		Arleigh Burke-class destroyer	DDG-59	
27 May	United States Navy	Paul Hamilton		Arleigh Burke-class destroyer	DDG-60	
22 June	Royal Navy	Richmond		Type 23 frigate	F239	
22 July	United States Navy	Ramage		Arleigh Burke-class destroyer	DDG-61	
18 August	United States Navy	Tucson		Los Angeles-class submarine	SSN-770	
5 September	Royal Netherlands Navy	Van Speijk		Karel Doorman-class frigate	F828	
30 September	United States Navy	Carter Hall		Harpers Ferry-class dock landing ship	LSD-50	
9 October	United States Navy	Columbia		Los Angeles-class submarine	SSN-771	
14 October	United States Navy	Fitzgerald		Arleigh Burke-class destroyer	DDG-62	
21 October	United States Navy	Stethem		Arleigh Burke-class destroyer	DDG-63	
9 December	United States Navy	John C. Stennis		Nimitz-class aircraft carrier	CVN-74	
