= HNLMS Van Nes =

HNLMS Van Nes (Dutch: Hr.Ms. or Zr.Ms. Van Nes) may refer to following ships of the Royal Netherlands Navy:

- HNLMS Van Nes (1863)
- HNLMS Van Nes (1930), an Admiralen-class destroyer
- HNLMS Van Nes (F805), a Van Speijk-class frigate
- HNLMS Van Nes (F833), a Karel Doorman-class frigate
