= HNLMS Willem van der Zaan =

Two ships of the Royal Netherlands Navy have been named HNLMS Willem van der Zaan in honour of the 17th century Schout-bij-nacht ("Rear Admiral") Willem Van Der Zaan.

- HNLMS Willem van der Zaan (ML-2), was a minelayer launched in 1939, and scrapped in 1970.
- HNLMS Willem van der Zaan (F829), was a Karel Doorman-class frigate, launched in 1989, and sold to the Belgian Navy in 2005 and renamed Louise-Marie.
