= Roofdier-class frigate =

Ship class

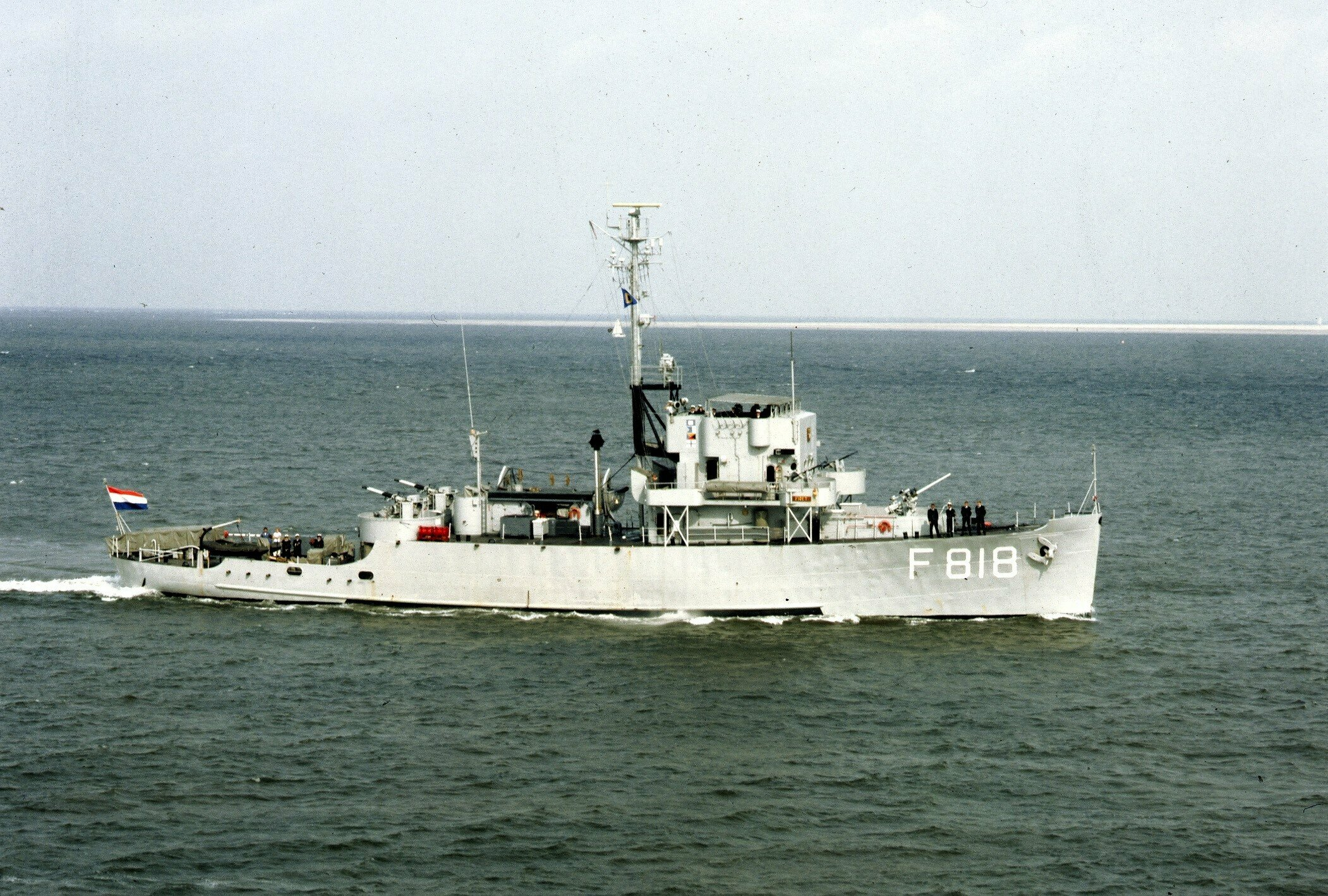
- Fret

Class overview
- Name: Roofdier class
- Builders: Avondale Marine Inc. Ways, New Orleans; General Shipbuilding & Engineering Works, Boston
- Operators: Royal Netherlands Navy
- Succeeded by: Karel Doorman class
- Built: 1951–1954
- In commission: 1954–1984
- Planned: 6
- Completed: 6
- Retired: 6

General characteristics
- Type: Frigate / patrol craft escort
- Displacement: 945 tons
- Length: 56.3 m (184 ft 9 in)
- Beam: 10.3 m (33 ft 10 in)
- Draught: 2.95 m (9 ft 8 in)
- Propulsion: 1,600 hp (1,200 kW); 2 propeller; 2 General Motors diesel engines
- Speed: 15 knots (28 km/h; 17 mph)
- Range: 9,000 nmi (17,000 km; 10,000 mi)
- Complement: 65
- Armament: 1 × 3"/50 caliber gun; 2 × 40 mm cannons; 2 × 20 mm cannons; Hedgehog; 3 × depth charge launcher; Depth charge racks

The Roofdier class (Dutch: Predator) was a class of six frigates that were built in the United States as Patrol Craft Escorts (PCE) for the Netherlands. The frigates were loaned to the Royal Netherlands Navy as part of the Mutual Defense Assistance Act (MDAP) and from 1954 to 1984 served as the Roofdier-class frigates.

== History ==
After the Second World War had ended the fleet of the Royal Netherlands Navy had to rebuild since it lost many of its ships during the war, and those that were left were either outdated or barely usable because of their extensive use during the war. Rebuilding the fleet was therefore a priority and the Dutch government had ambitious plans for this. However, it could not realised by only making use of the Dutch shipbuilding industry, there was simply not enough capacity to do this on a fast basis. That is why Dutch government formally asked under the Mutual Defense Assistance Act (MDAP) if the United States could lend several ships. The United States approved some of the requests and ordered in 1952 six Patrol Craft Escorts (PCE) to be built for the Netherlands. Since 1943 ships of this design had been built extensively and were during the Second World War used for anti-submarine warfare (ASW) in coastal areas. In these coastal areas they protected vulnerable merchant ships against attacks by German U-boats. To do this the ships had been equipped with engines that would allow the ships to move fast enough to hunt submarines. The PCEs were wider and longer than previous patrol ships, better equipped and could be built relatively cheap.

The frigates were taken into use from 1954 onwards. The vessels, which were designated by the United States with hull numbers PCE-1604 up to and including PCE-1609, were put into service as HNLMS Wolf (F817), HNLMS Fret (F818), HNLMS Hermelijn (F819), HNLMS Vos (F820), HNLMS Panter (F821) and HNLMS Jaguar (F822). At the later stage of their service they were mainly used as police and patrol ship, performing mostly patrolling tasks in the North Sea coastal area of the Netherlands. Here they performed also on a regular basis fishing inspections and were generally busy with protecting Dutch interests. They have also been used as training ships for numerous officers. When they took part in international navy exercises they mostly accompanied the larger surface ships. In times of war the ships could also be used to defend convoys against aircraft, submarines and surface ships.

The original six vessels were taken out of service in 1984, because these vessels were very outdated. The vessels were succeeded by the multipurpose frigates of the Karel Doorman class. The vessels of the Roofdier class have all been scrapped.

== Design ==
The designs of Roofdier-class frigates were mostly the same as the Patrol Craft Escorts (PCE) built during the Second World War, some changes based on the experiences that had been gained during Second World War. At this time the PCEs protected the Allied ships, mostly merchant ships, against attacks by enemy submarines. They were specifically made for this and as a result were quite successful against the continuous German U-boat attacks. The successes of their design were that they had good seaworthiness, which was important since the ships had to be able to travel along the entire voyage of convoys. Furthermore, they were relatively small with a length of 56 meters (183 ft 9 in) and a width of 10 meters (32 ft 10 in). Besides that, they had a good speed to keep up with convoys and deal with submarines. At a cruising speed of 10 knots (19 km/h; 12 mph), the very large fuel tanks guaranteed an interrupted activity of 9,000 nautical miles (17,000 km; 10,000 mi), or three weeks endurance, which was a big plus for an all-round escort. The two diesel engines, which together delivered 1,600 horsepower (1,200 kW), turned out to be extremely reliable.

=== Sensors and processing systems ===
The Roofdier class frigates were equipped with a Decca 1229 radar and a Kelvin Hughes navigation set. Furthermore, they mounted a QCU-2 sonar.

=== Accommodation ===
When it came to accommodation, the ships had two large sleeping areas of about 30 beds each in the bow for the sailors and corporals. However, the washbasins, toilets and showers for them were in the back of the ship. The men who slept in the front sleeping quarters had to go back through the second bedroom and the cafeteria for the toilets and washbasins. The showers were not allowed to be used because the ship could not bring enough drinking water. For the 60 men there were 6 stainless steel sinks.

== Ships in class ==
The following ships were part of the Roofdier class, three were built by Avondale Marine Inc. Ways and three by General Shipbuilding & Engineering Works.

Ship	Pennant number	Commissioned	Fate
Wolf	F817	1954	Scrapped in 1984.
Fret	F818	1954	Scrapped in 1984.
Hermelijn	F819	1954	Scrapped in 1984.
Vos	F820	1954	Scrapped in 1984.
Panter	F821	1954	Scrapped in 1984.
Jaguar	F822	1954	Scrapped in 1984.

== See also ==
- List of frigates of the Netherlands

Equivalent frigates of the same era

- Petya class
- Bergamini class
- Azopardo class
- Loch class
