= NRP Dom Francisco de Almeida =

Frigate

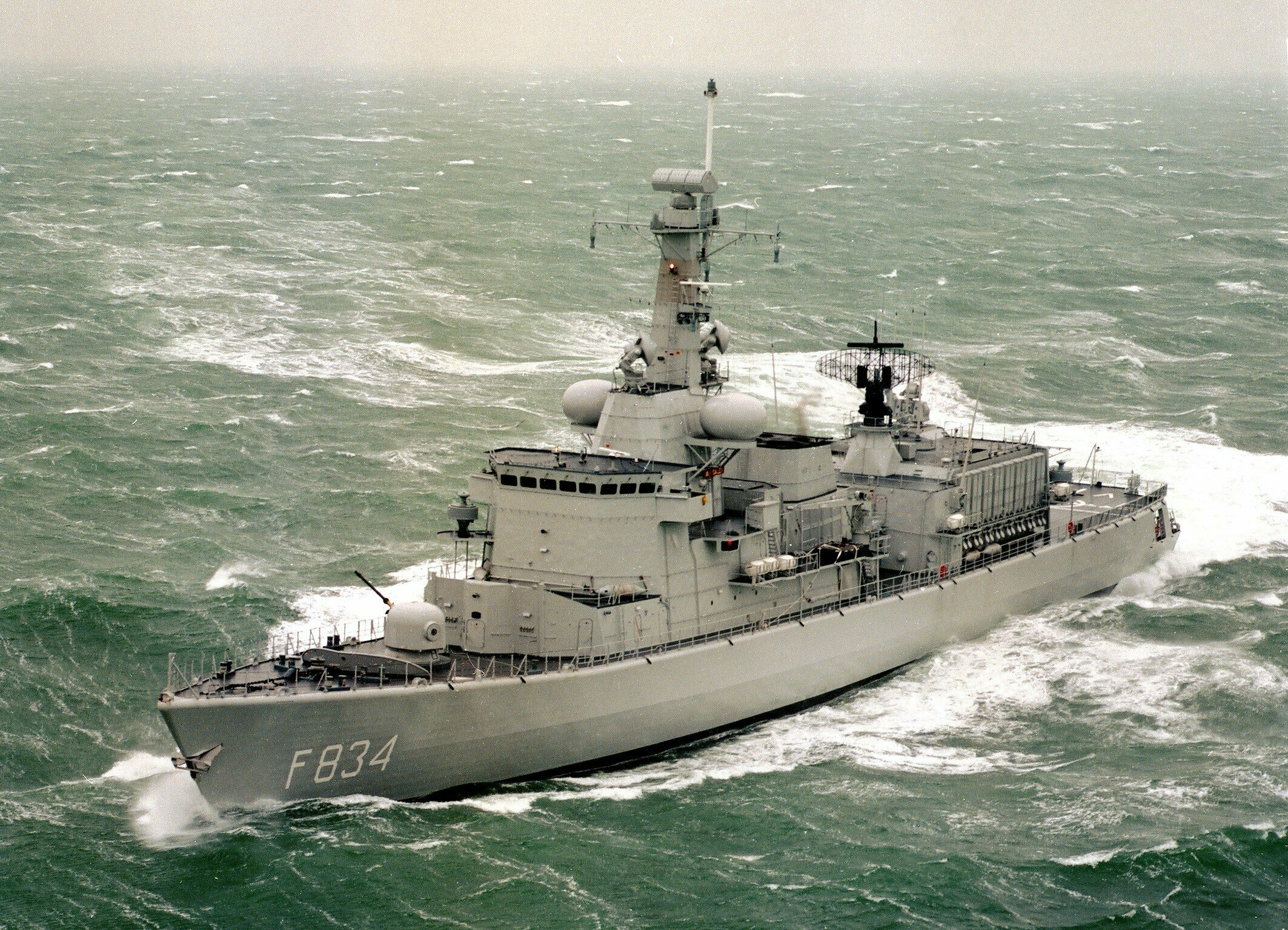
- HNLMS Van Galen in 1994

History

Netherlands
- Name: HNLMS Van Galen
- Namesake: Johan van Galen
- Operator: Royal Netherlands Navy
- Builder: Koninklijke Maatschappij De Schelde
- Laid down: 7 June 1990
- Launched: 21 November 1992
- Commissioned: 1 December 1994
- Decommissioned: 2009
- Identification: Callsign: PAMG
- Fate: Sold to Portugal in 2009.

Portugal
- Name: Dom Francisco de Almeida
- Namesake: Francisco de Almeida
- Owner: Portuguese Navy
- Acquired: 2009
- Identification: MMSI number: 999120433; Callsign: CTFN
- Status: in active service

General characteristics
- Class & type: Karel Doorman-class frigate (Bartolomeu Dias-Class)
- Displacement: 2,800 long tons (2,845 t) standard; 3,320 long tons (3,373 t) full load
- Length: 122.25 m (401 ft 1 in) oa; 114.40 m (375 ft 4 in) pp
- Beam: 14.37 m (47 ft 2 in)
- Draught: 6.05 m (19 ft 10 in)
- Propulsion: 2 × Rolls-Royce Spey 1A gas turbines, 48,256 shp (35,984 kW) total; 2 × Stork-Werkspoor diesel engines, 4,225 hp (3.151 MW) each
- Speed: 29 kn (54 km/h) (gas turbines); 21 kn (39 km/h; 24 mph) (diesels)
- Range: 5,000 nmi (9,300 km; 5,800 mi) at 18 kn (33 km/h; 21 mph)
- Endurance: 30 days
- Complement: 154
- Sensors & processing systems: Thales Nederland LW-08 early warning radar; Thales Nederland SMART-S 3-D air-search; SeaWatcher 100 active phased array surface detection and tracking radar; Thales Gatekeeper; Staring Electro-Optic Ship Security System; Thales Scout surface search radar; 2 × Thales STIR-18 fire control radar; Decca 1609/9 navigation radar; PHS-36 active bow sonar
- Electronic warfare & decoys: Thales Vigile APX Radar Electronic Support Measures
- Armament: 1 × Oto Melara 76 mm anti-air/anti-surface gun; 16-cell Mark 48 Vertical Launch System (VLS) – 16 Sea Sparrow missile; 8 × Harpoon anti-ship missiles; 1 × Goalkeeper CIWS (point defence gun); 4 × Mk 32 324 mm torpedo tubes, Mark 46 torpedoes
- Aircraft carried: NH90 NFH (2009) or Westland Lynx (pre-2009) for Royal Netherlands Navy and Super Lynx Mk.95 for Portuguese Navy

HNLMS Van Galen (F834) (Dutch: Hr.Ms. Van Galen) is a ship of the Karel Doorman class of multi-purpose frigates of the Royal Netherlands Navy. Built by the shipyard Koninklijke Schelde Groep in Vlissingen. The ship is named after captain and convoy commander Johan van Galen and served from 1994 to 2008 with the Dutch navy. The radio call sign of the frigate was "PAMG". In 2009 HNLMS Van Galen was sold to Portugal. The ship was transferred in 2010 to the Portuguese Navy, where the ship was put into service as the NRP Dom Francisco de Almeida (F334).

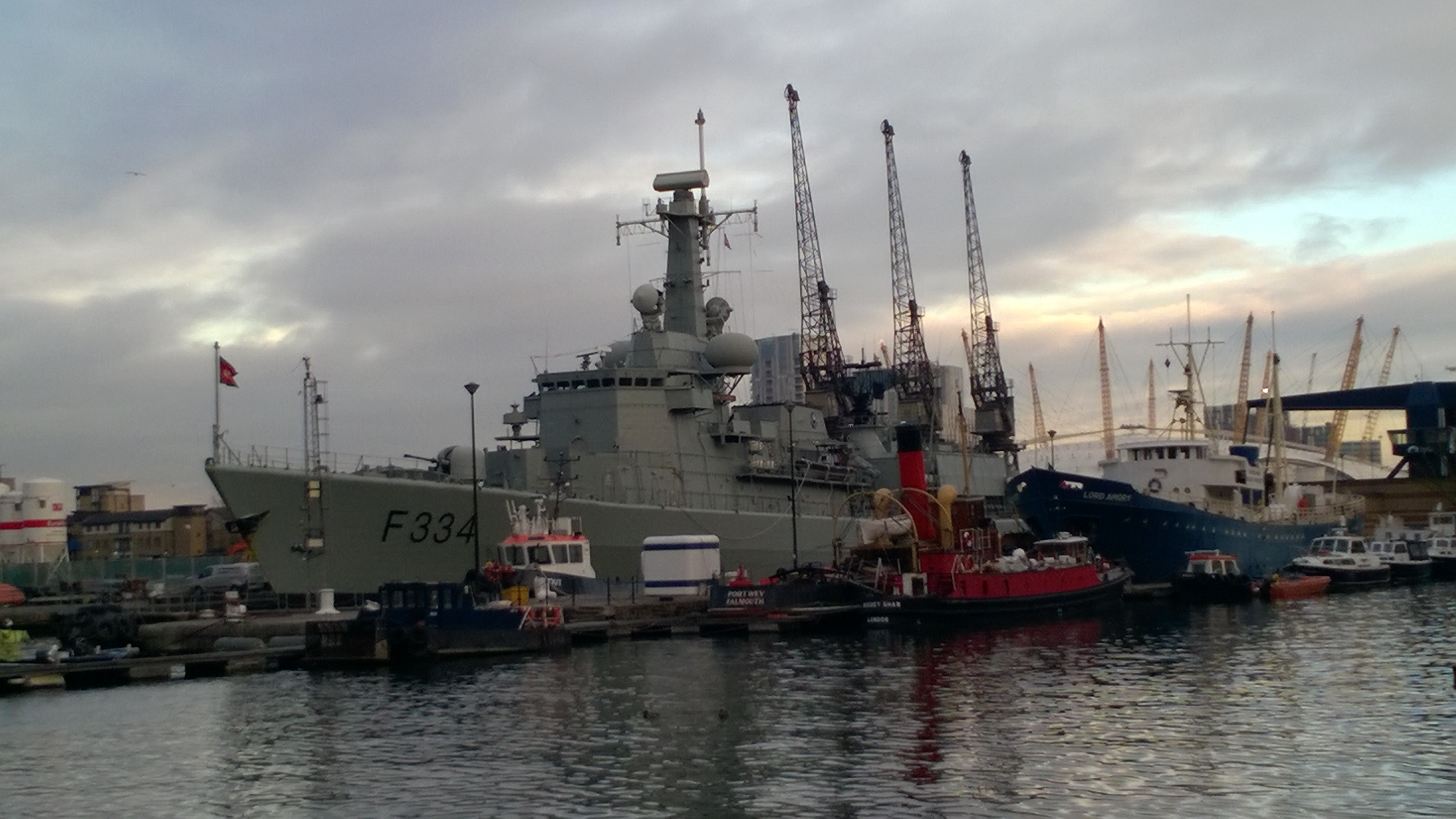
D. Francisco de Almeida moored in London in 2017

HNLMS Van Galen is one of eight Karel Doorman-class frigates and built at the Koninklijke Schelde Groep yard in Vlissingen. The keel laying took place on 7 June 1990 and the launching on 21 November 1992. The ship was put into service on 1 December 1994. The ship participated in the UNIFIL mission off the coast of Lebanon.
