= Abraham van der Hulst =

Dutch admiral

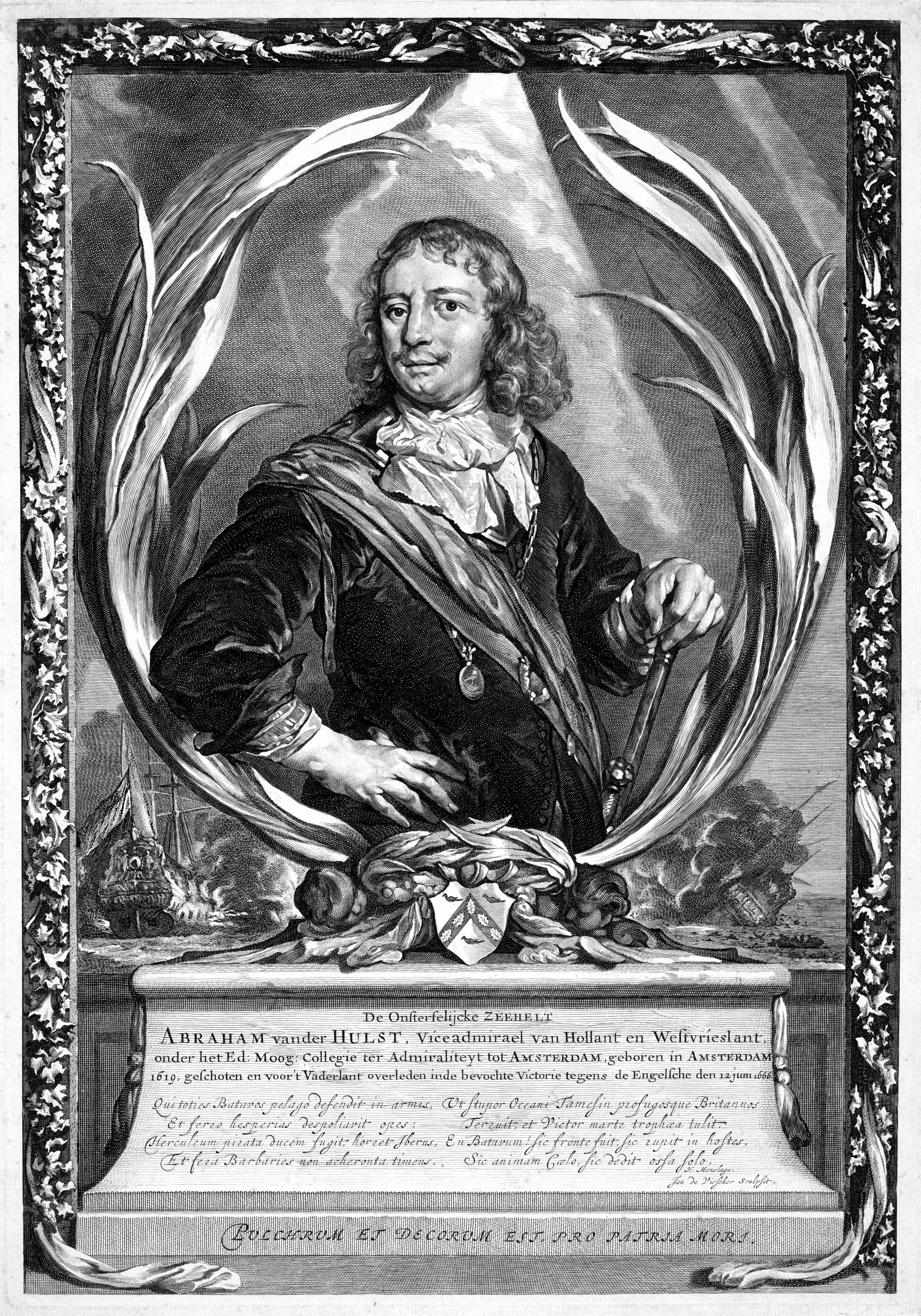
- Abraham van der Hulst, by Jan de Visscher
- Born: 11 April 1619; Amsterdam, Dutch Republic
- Died: 12 June 1666 (aged 47) North Foreland, England
- Buried: Oude Kerk, Amsterdam
- Allegiance: Dutch Republic
- Branch: Royal Netherlands Navy
- Rank: Admiral
- Commands: Groningen
- Conflicts: First Anglo-Dutch War; Battle of the Gabbard; Battle of Scheveningen; Dutch-Portuguese War; Second Anglo-Dutch War; Battle of Lowestoft; Four Days' Battle

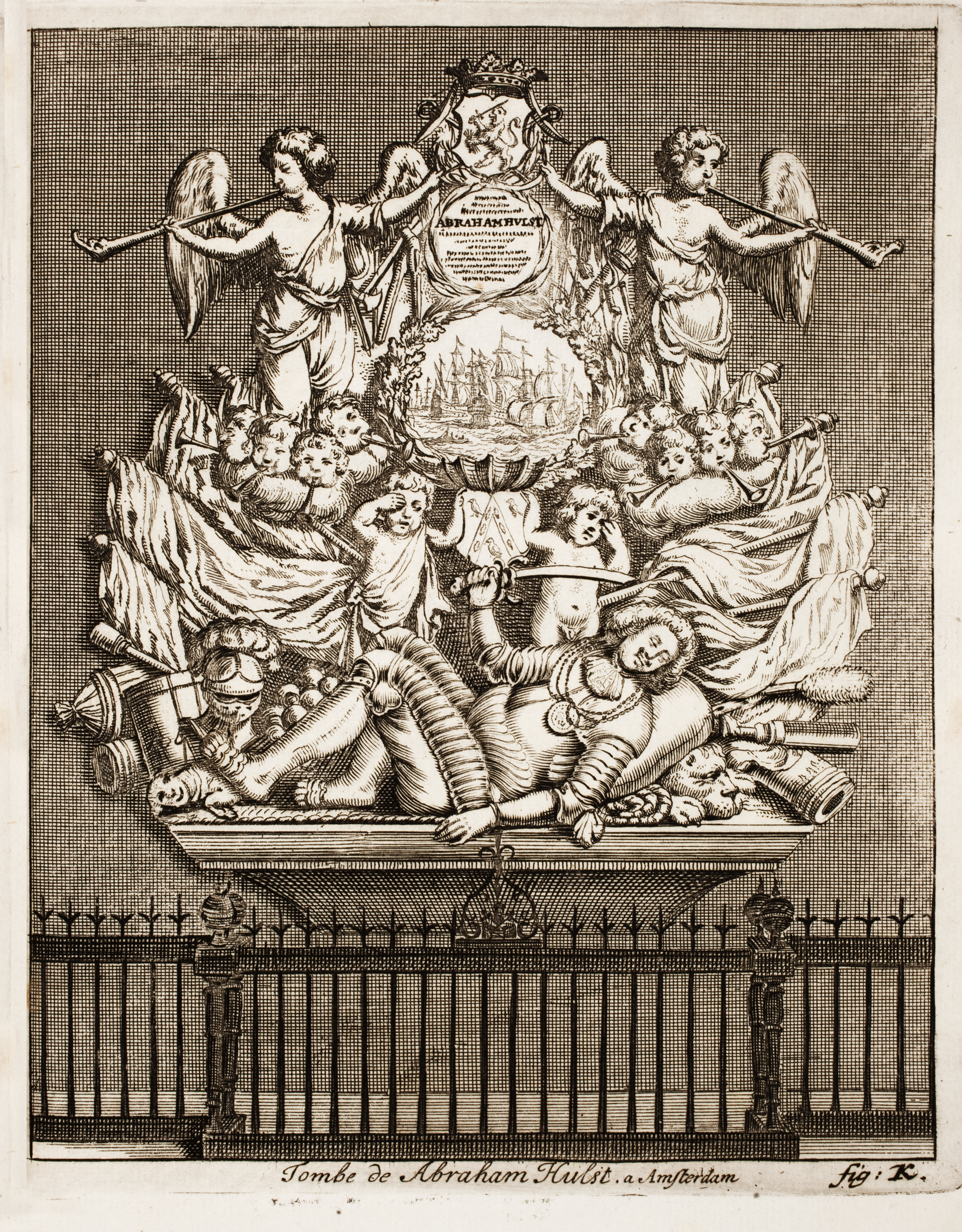
Tomb monument in Amsterdam

Abraham van der Hulst (Amsterdam, 11 April 1619 – 12 June 1666) was a Dutch admiral in the 17th century.

Van der Hulst was appointed extraordinary captain in 1650. He served as captain of Groningen in the First Anglo-Dutch War, being promoted to full captain in 1653, becoming flag captain of Vice-Admiral Witte de With on Vrijheid, fighting in the Battle of the Gabbard and the Battle of Scheveningen.

In 1654 he had convoy duty in the Mediterranean. In 1656, in the Dutch-Portuguese War, he took two merchantmen during the blockade of Portugal. In 1658 he was flag captain of Vice-Admiral Michiel de Ruyter on Hilversum while again blockading Portugal. In 1661 he served in De Ruyter's fleet in the Mediterranean. When the Second Anglo-Dutch War threatened he was on 29 January appointed temporary Rear-Admiral with the Admiralty of Amsterdam. In the Battle of Lowestoft in 1665 he was second in command in the squadron of Lieutenant-Admiral Jacob van Wassenaer Obdam, taking over command of this unit when the latter was killed because his flagship exploded. The battle was a heavy defeat for the Dutch and those captains fighting bitterly to cover the retreat of the fleet were seen as heroes, among them Van der Hulst who was promoted on 25 July to Vice-Admiral.

In the Four Days' Battle he was second in command in the squadron of Lieutenant-Admiral Cornelis Tromp. On the second day due to a communication mistake Tromp failed to follow the turn of the main body of the Dutch fleet into the back of the English fleet. As a result, his squadron became isolated and attacked by a superior English force. Before De Ruyter could break the English line and save Tromp's force, several ships had taken a horrible pounding, among them Spiegel, Van der Hulst's flagship. He himself was mortally wounded by a musket ball in the breast. Spiegel was abandoned but later salvaged.

Van der Hulst was buried in the Oude Kerk in Amsterdam; a marble grave memorial was later erected, a work of Artus de With.

His name was later given to a Karel Doorman-class frigate in 1993, HNLMS Abraham van der Hulst.
