= HNLMS Abraham van der Hulst (F832) =

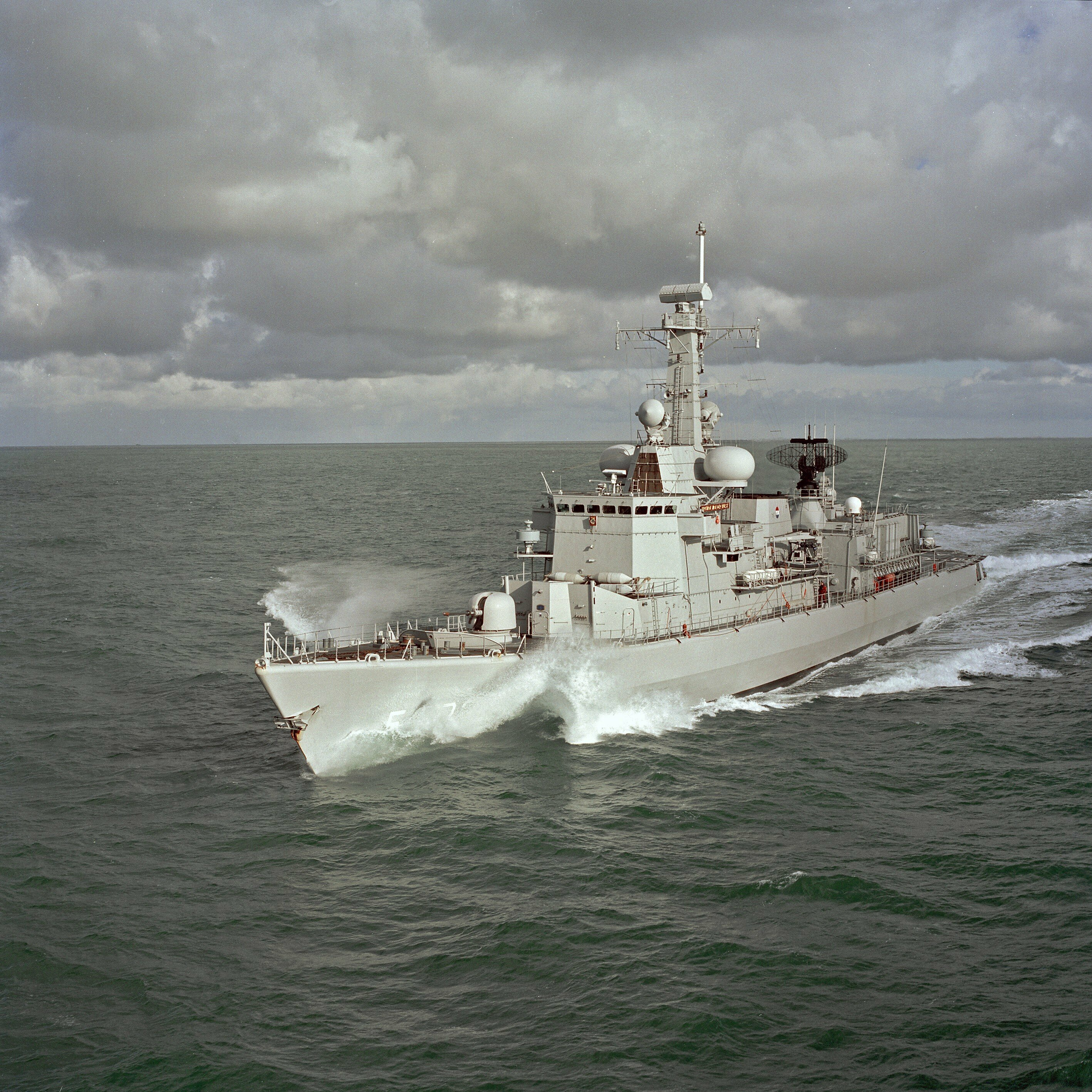
- Abraham van der Hulst in 2000

History

Netherlands
- Name: Abraham van der Hulst
- Namesake: Abraham van der Hulst
- Builder: Koninklijke Schelde Groep, Vlissingen
- Laid down: 8 February 1989
- Launched: 7 September 1991
- Commissioned: 15 December 1993
- Decommissioned: 2004
- Fate: Sold to Chile

Chile
- Name: Almirante Blanco Encalada
- Namesake: Manuel Blanco Encalada
- Owner: Chilean Navy
- Commissioned: 16 December 2005
- Status: in active service

General characteristics
- Class & type: Karel Doorman-class frigate
- Displacement: 3,320 tons
- Length: 122.25 m (401.1 ft)
- Beam: 14.37 m (47.1 ft)
- Draught: 4.3 m (14 ft)
- Propulsion: 2 Rolls-Royce (Spey 1A) 16700 hp (12.45 MW) gasturbines; 2 Stork-Werkspoor 4895 hp (3.650 MW) diesel engines
- Speed: 29 kn (54 km/h; 33 mph)
- Complement: 174
- Armament: 16 × RIM-7 Sea Sparrow anti-air VLS; 1 × Oto Melara 76 mm anti-air/anti-surface gun; 1 × Goalkeeper CIWS (point defence gun); 4 × Mk 32 324 mm torpedo tubes, Mark 46 torpedoes
- Aircraft carried: 1 × Lynx helicopter

HNLMS Abraham van der Hulst (Dutch: Hr.Ms. Abraham van der Hulst) was a ship of the Karel Doorman-class of multi-purpose frigates of the Royal Netherlands Navy where it used the radio call sign was "PAMF". Built by the shipyard Koninklijke Schelde Groep in Vlissingen. The ship is named after the Dutch Admiral Abraham van der Hulst. She was sold to the Chilean Navy where the ship was renamed Almirante Blanco Encalada.

== Dutch service ==
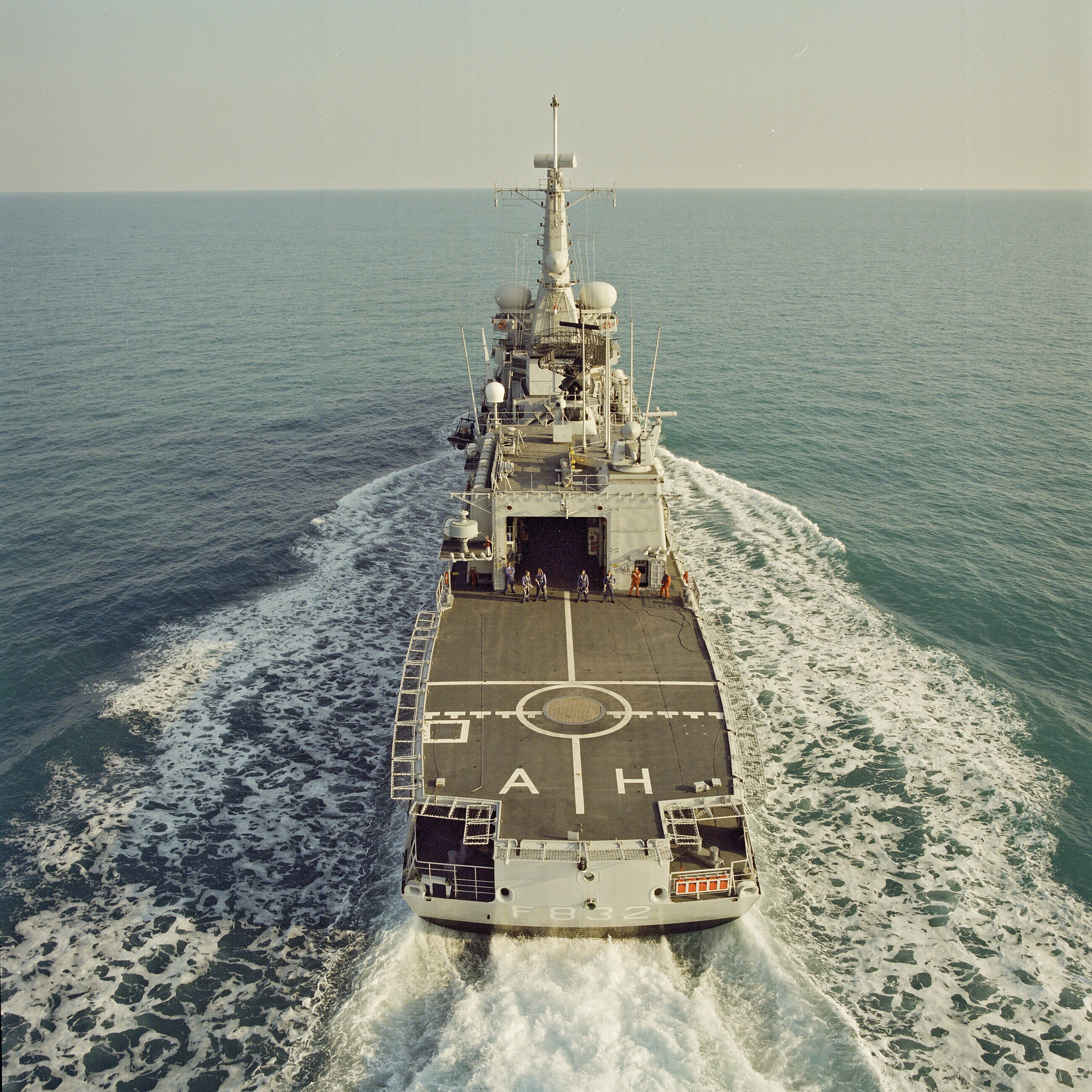
Aft view of the hangar and flight deck

HNLMS Abraham van der Hulst was one of six Karel Doorman-class frigates that were built at the Koninklijke Schelde Groep in Vlissingen. The keel laying took place on 8 February 1989 and the launching on 7 September 1991. The ship was put into service on 15 December 1993.

13 February 1998 while off Corsica serving in the NATO squadron STANAVFORMED she received orders to steam through the Suez Canal to the Persian Gulf to join a UN operation to enforce a trade embargo on Iraq. This lasted until 31 May that year. After this she was sent to Eritrea to assist with the evacuation of European citizens.

After 9/11 the ship part was deployed to the Caribbean in 2002, to execute counter narcotics operation, as backfill for US Navy and Coast Guard units, that were deployed to Operation Enduring Freedom.

In 2003 the ship participated in Operation Active Endeavour, being the flagship op STANAVFORMED. The last operational mission of the ship, while in service of the Koninklijke Marine, was protecting US cargovessels that had to sail through the Strait of Gibraltar, on their way to the Persian Gulf region in 2003. The last foreign port of call was Lisbon, before the ship returned to its homeport in Den Helder.

In 2004 the vessel was decommissioned and sold to the Chilean Navy.

== Chilean service history ==
The ship was put into service on 16 December 2005 where the ship was renamed Almirante Blanco Encalada.
