= Belgian frigate Leopold I =

Former HNLMS Karel Doorman

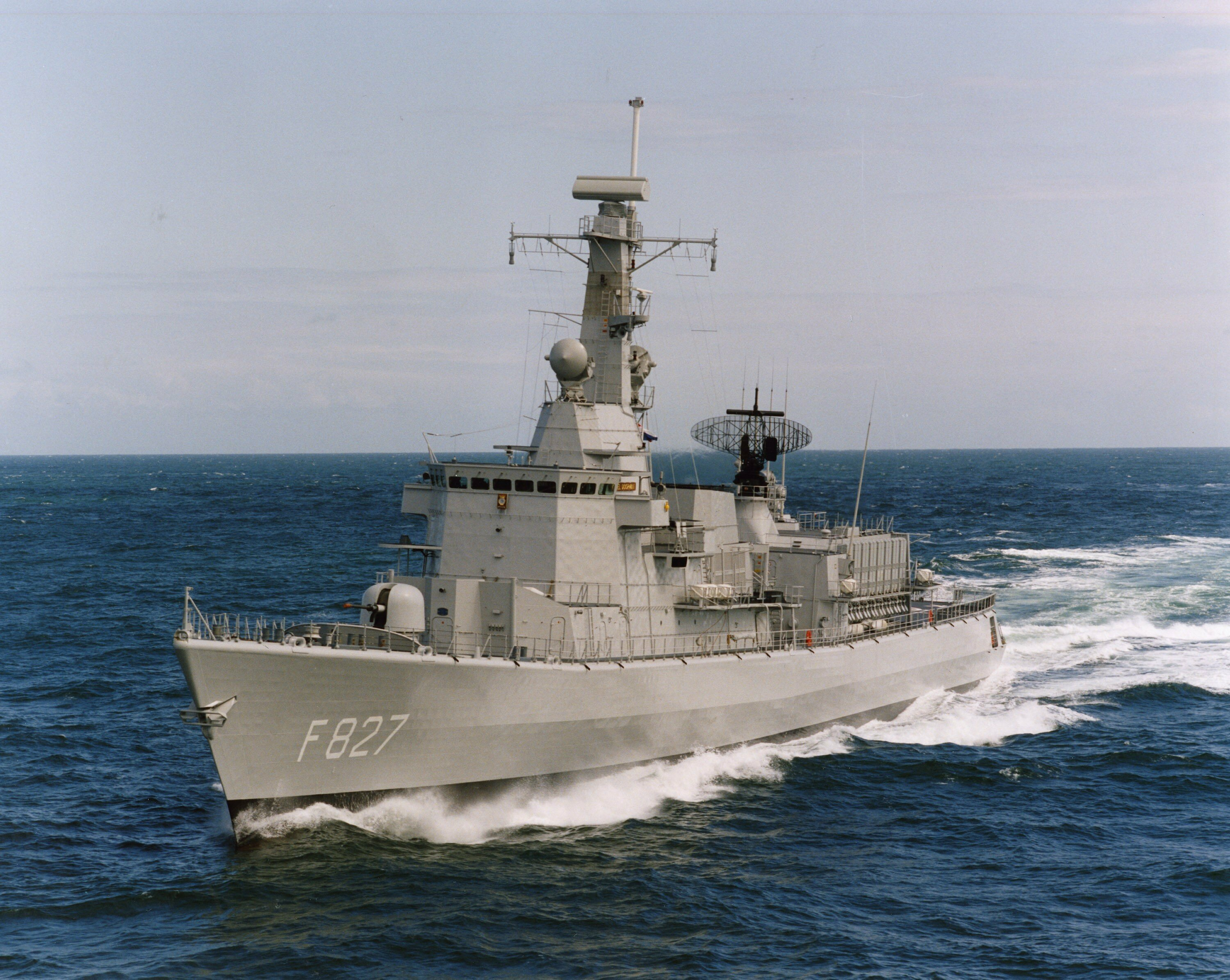
- HNLMS Karel Doorman

History

Netherlands
- Name: Karel Doorman
- Namesake: Schout-bij-nacht Karel Doorman
- Builder: Koninklijke Schelde Groep, Vlissingen (Netherlands)
- Laid down: 26 February 1985
- Launched: 20 April 1988
- Commissioned: 31 May 1991
- Decommissioned: 2006
- Identification: F827
- Fate: Sold to Belgium on 22 December 2005, and transferred on 29 March 2007

Belgium
- Name: Leopold I
- Namesake: King Leopold I of Belgium
- Christened: 29 March 2007, by Queen Fabiola of Belgium
- Acquired: Purchased on 22 December 2005, from the Royal Netherlands Navy
- In service: 29 March 2007
- Home port: Zeebrugge Naval Base
- Identification: Pennant number: F930; MMSI number: 205203000; Callsign: ORJP
- Motto: Audaces Fortuna Juvat ("Fortune favours the bold"; Latin)
- Status: Active
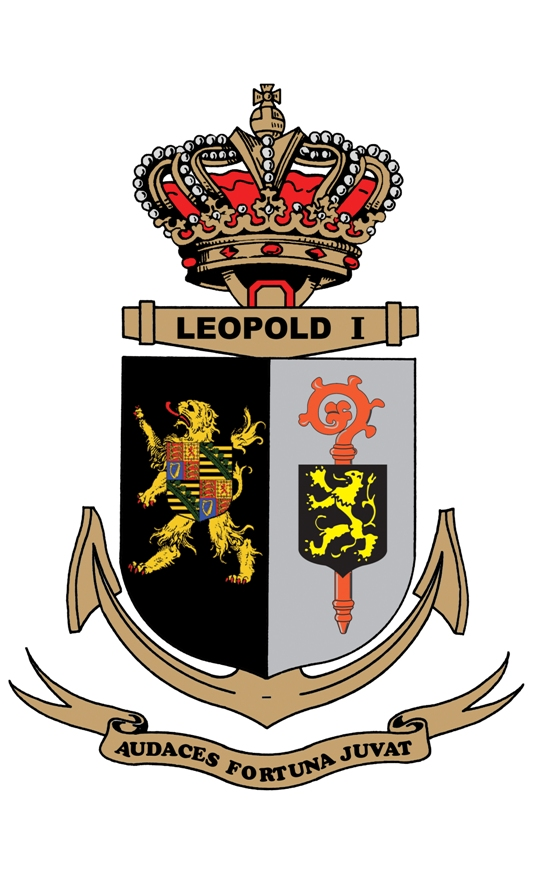
- Badge

General characteristics
- Class & type: Karel Doorman-class frigate
- Displacement: 2,800 tonnes
- Length: 122.325 m (401 ft 3.9 in)
- Beam: 14.37 m (47 ft 2 in)
- Draught: 6.2 m (20 ft 4 in)
- Speed: 24 knots (44 km/h; 28 mph)
- Complement: 15 officers, 70 NCOs, 60 sailors
- Armament: 16 × RIM-7 Sea Sparrow anti-air VLS; 8 × Boeing Harpoon anti-ship missile; 2–6 × FN MAG 7.62 mm machine gun; 2–4 × Browning M2 12.7 mm machine gun; 2 × Twin-Mark 46 torpedo tubes; 1 × OTO Melara 76 mm gun; 1 × Goalkeeper CIWS
- Aircraft carried: 1 x NH90 NFH helicopter

Leopold I (F930) is a Karel Doorman-class frigate of the Belgian Navy of the Belgian Armed Forces. Prior to 29 March 2007, the ship was known as HNLMS Karel Doorman (F827). It is one of the two frigates of this class purchased from the Royal Netherlands Navy on 22 December 2005.

== HNLMS Karel Doorman ==
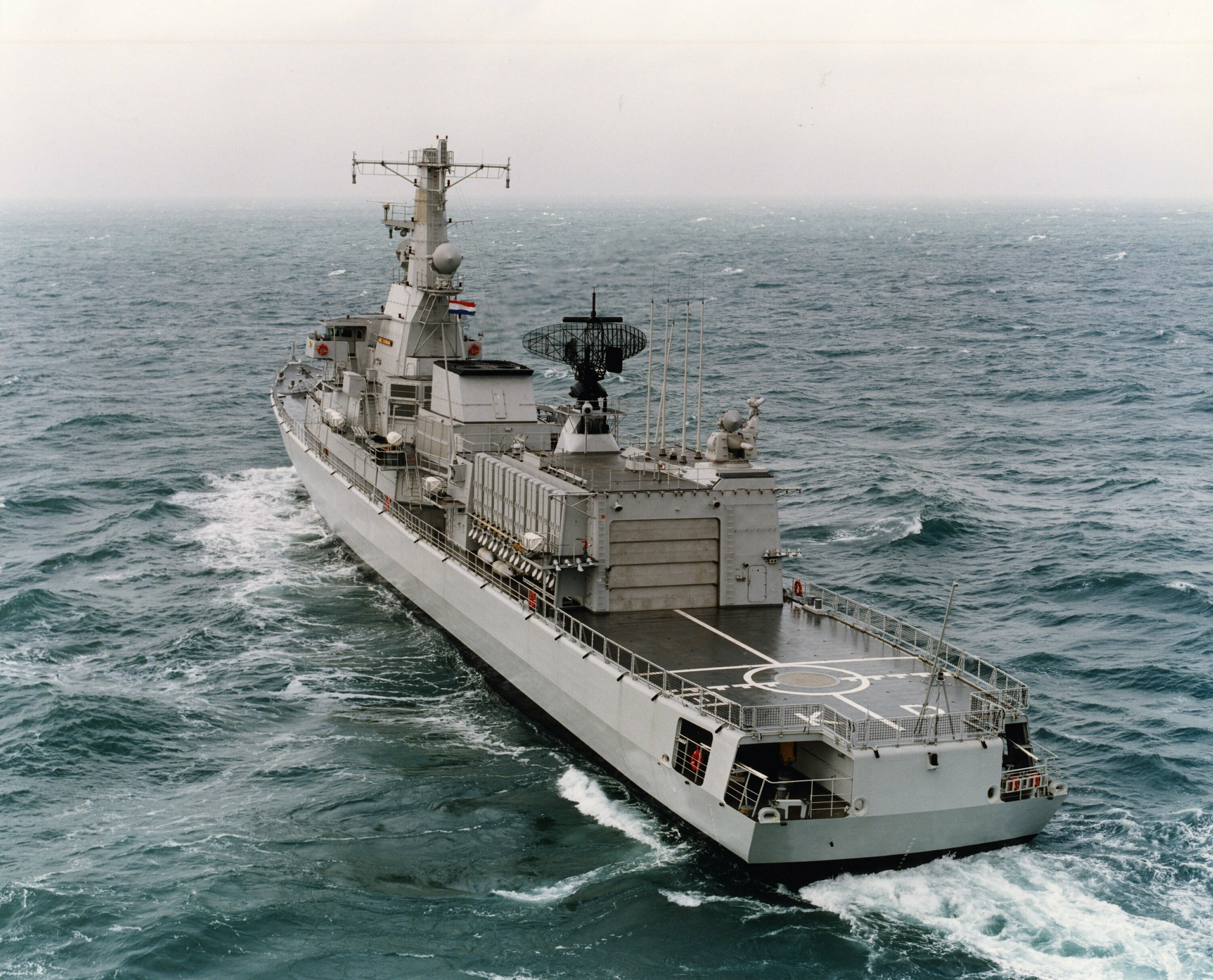
Karel Doorman, view from the stern

HNLMS Karel Doorman was the first ship of the Karel Doorman class of multi-purpose frigates (also known as "M-fregat" class). She was the third ship in the Royal Netherlands Navy to be named after Admiral Karel Doorman, who was killed during the Battle of the Java Sea. The ship was laid down on 26 February 1985, launched on 20 April 1988 and commissioned on 31 May 1991.

She took part in anti-drug operations in the Caribbean together with the US Navy, was part of the UN operations in the Adriatic Sea during the conflicts in the former republics of Yugoslavia, as well as various NATO exercises.

== Leopold I ==
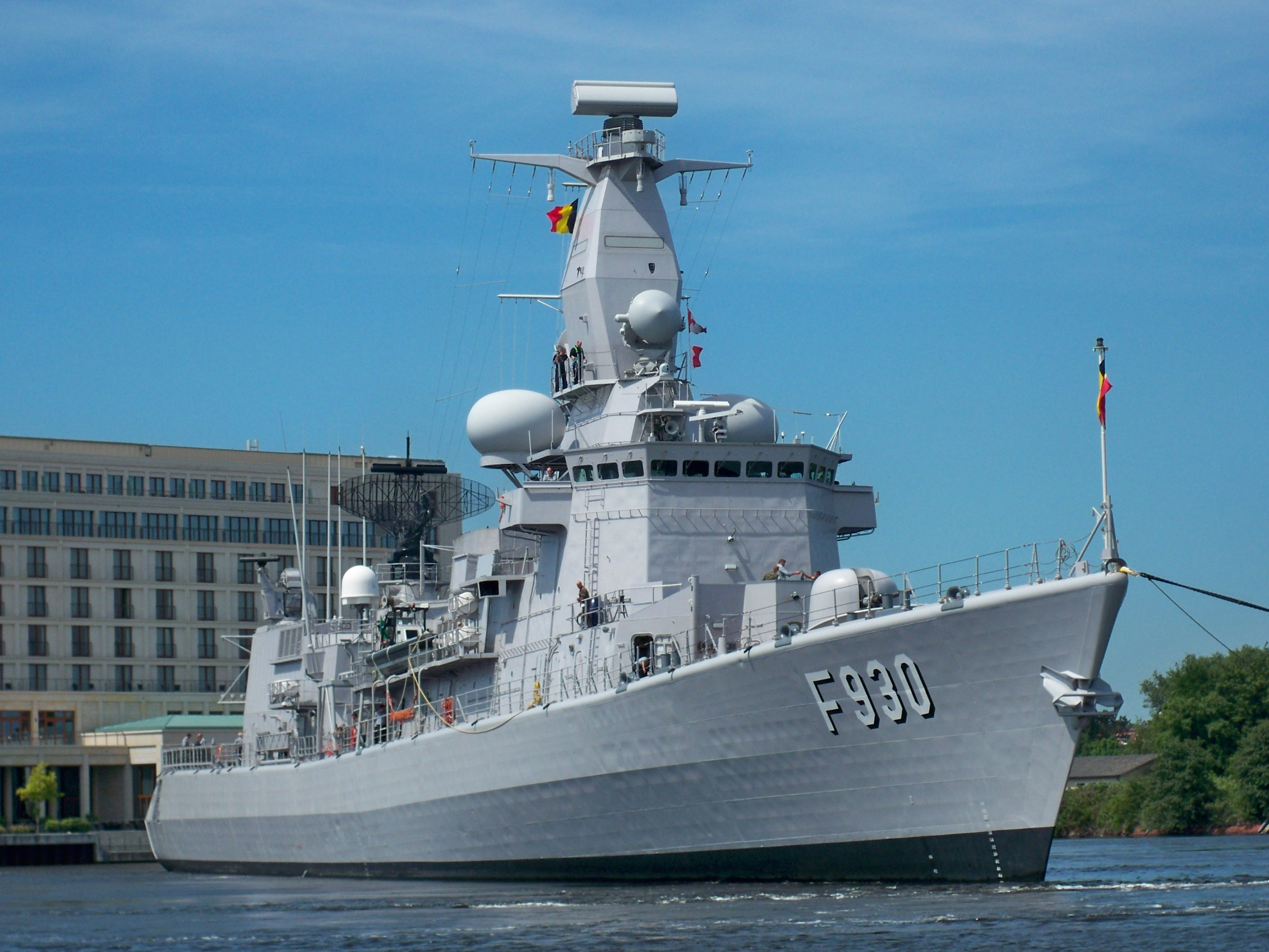
Belgian frigate Leopold I

On 20 July 2005, the Belgian government decided to buy two of the remaining six Dutch M-class frigates to replace the two remaining frigates of the Wielingen class (Wielingen and Westdiep) then in service with the Belgian Naval Component. On 22 December 2005, Karel Doorman and Willem van der Zaan were sold to Belgium.

Karel Doorman was taken out of service in 2006 and turned over to the Belgian Marine Component on 29 March 2007 where the ship was christened Leopold I, in honour of the first King of the Belgians, by Queen Fabiola of Belgium at Zeebrugge Marine Base. The patronage of Leopold I was accepted by the city of Nivelles. Willem van der Zaan was commissioned into the Belgian Marine Component as Louise-Marie in April 2008.

=== East African deployment ===
Leopold I embarked upon her first official mission for the Naval Component on 5 September 2007. She was deployed to East Africa as part of the international mission against Somali pirates. The operation was given the codename East African Venture. On 30 November 2007 she arrived back at her home port of Zeebrugge, marking the end of the deployment.

=== Fight against ISIL ===
In November 2015, a French Navy press release stated that Leopold I would be part of the Charles de Gaulle task force launching strikes against the Islamic State of Iraq and the Levant. Her deployment took place from 18 November 2015 to 4 January 2016.

=== Coronavirus pandemic ===
Belgian Defense announced on 25 March 2020 that a crew member had tested positive for SARS-CoV-2. The sailor had been evacuated via air to Den Helder on 20 March 2020 after he began showing symptoms, and was quarantined at home when the test returned positive on 24 March. As a precaution, the ship broke off from its operation with the French carrier battle group led by Charles de Gaulle and returned to Zeebrugge on 27 March 2020, about a month earlier than planned.

On 22 July 2026 Leopold I arrived at the naval shipyard in Den Helder for repairs.
