= Chilean frigate Almirante Riveros =

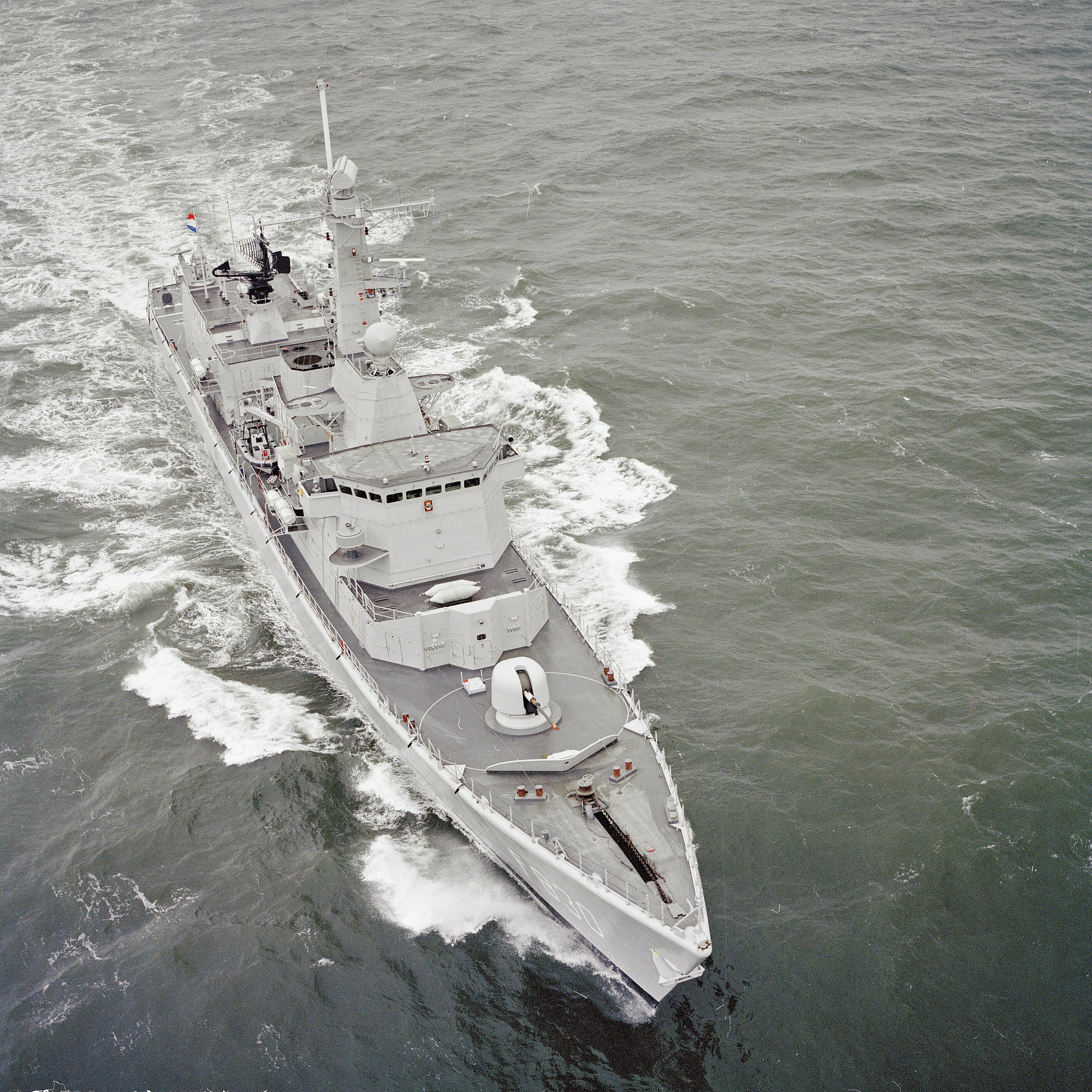
- Tjerk Hiddes

History

Netherlands
- Name: Tjerk Hiddes
- Namesake: Tjerk Hiddes de Vries
- Builder: Koninklijke Schelde Groep, Vlissingen
- Laid down: 28 October 1986
- Launched: 9 December 1989
- Commissioned: 26 February 1993
- Decommissioned: 3 February 2006
- Fate: Sold to Chile

Chile
- Name: Almirante Riveros
- Namesake: Galvarino Riveros Cárdenas
- Owner: Chilean Navy
- Commissioned: April 2007
- Status: in active service

General characteristics
- Class & type: Karel Doorman-class frigate
- Displacement: 3,320 tons
- Length: 122.25 m (401.1 ft)
- Beam: 14.37 m (47.1 ft)
- Draught: 4.3 m (14 ft)
- Propulsion: 2 Rolls-Royce (Spey 1A) 16700 hp (12.45 MW) gasturbines; 2 Stork-Werkspoor 4895 hp (3.650 MW) diesel engines
- Speed: 29 kn (54 km/h; 33 mph)
- Complement: 174
- Armament: 16 × RIM-7 Sea Sparrow anti-air VLS; 1 × Oto Melara 76 mm anti-air/anti-surface gun; 1 × Goalkeeper CIWS (point defence gun); 4 × Mk 32 324 mm torpedo tubes, Mark 46 torpedoes
- Aircraft carried: 1 × Lynx helicopter

Almirante Riveros (FF-18) is a Karel Doorman-class frigate of the Chilean Navy. Built by the shipyard Koninklijke Schelde Groep in Vlissingen, the ship was previously in use by the Royal Netherlands Navy as HNLMS Tjerk Hiddes until 2006.

== Dutch service ==
HNLMS Tjerk Hiddes was one of six Karel Doorman-class frigates that were built at the Koninklijke Schelde Groep in Vlissingen. The keel laying took place on 28 October 1986 and the launching on 9 December 1989. The ship was put into service on 26 February 1993.

In June 1994 the ship participated in the BALTOPS 94 naval exercise with vessels from several other navies.

During her time with the Dutch navy she operated in the Atlantic Ocean and the Caribbean Sea and took part in Operation Enduring Freedom around the Arabian Peninsula and Operation Active Endeavour in Mediterranean Sea.

On 3 February 2006 the vessel was decommissioned and sold to the Chilean Navy.

== Chilean service ==
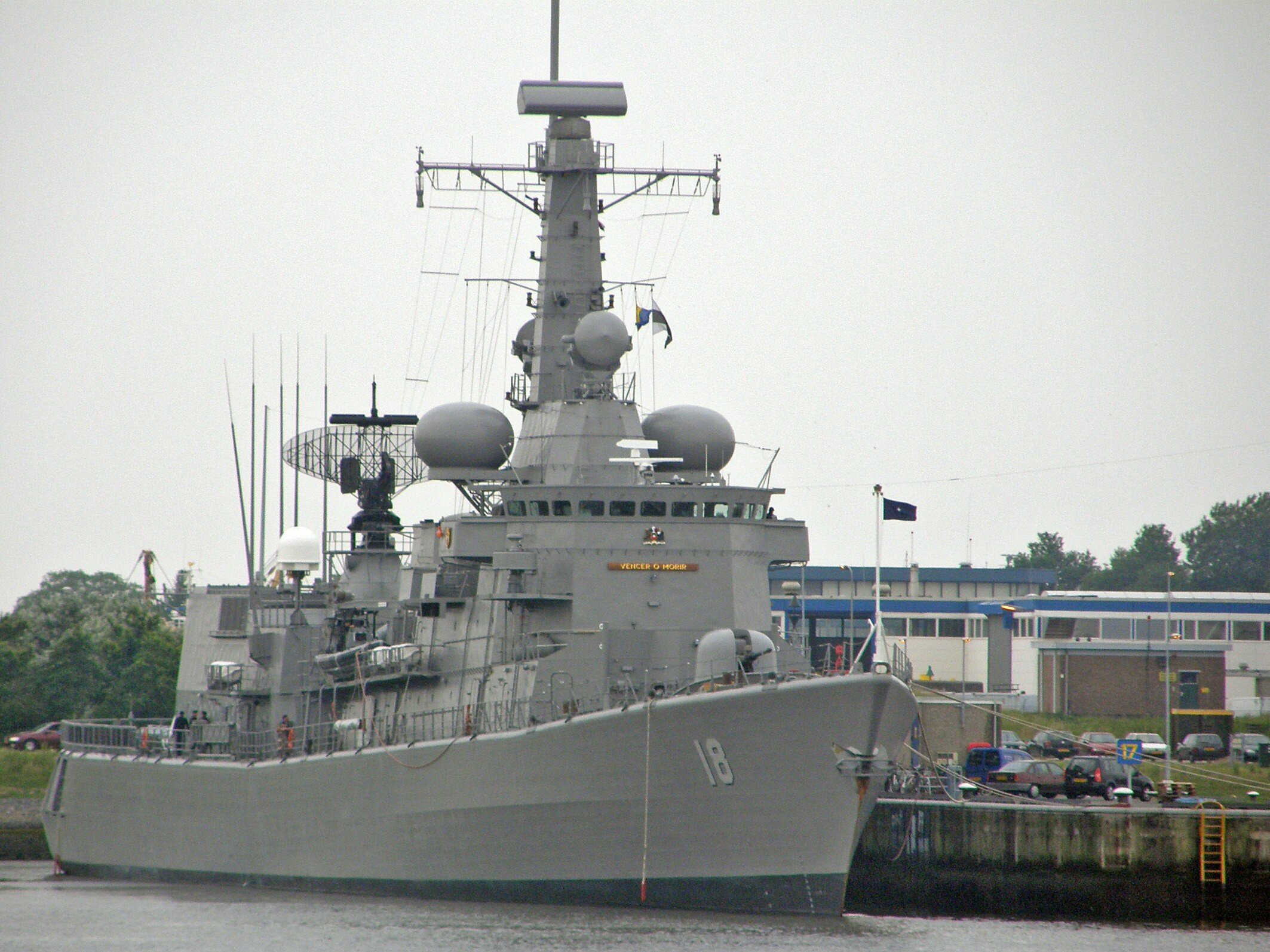
Almirante Riveros

The ship was put into service in April 2007 where the ship was renamed Almirante Riveros.

In November 2015 the ship participated in Exercise UNITAS Atlantic 2015 off the coast of Brazil, with vessels from several other navies.
