= HNLMS Van Speijk (F828) =

Frigate

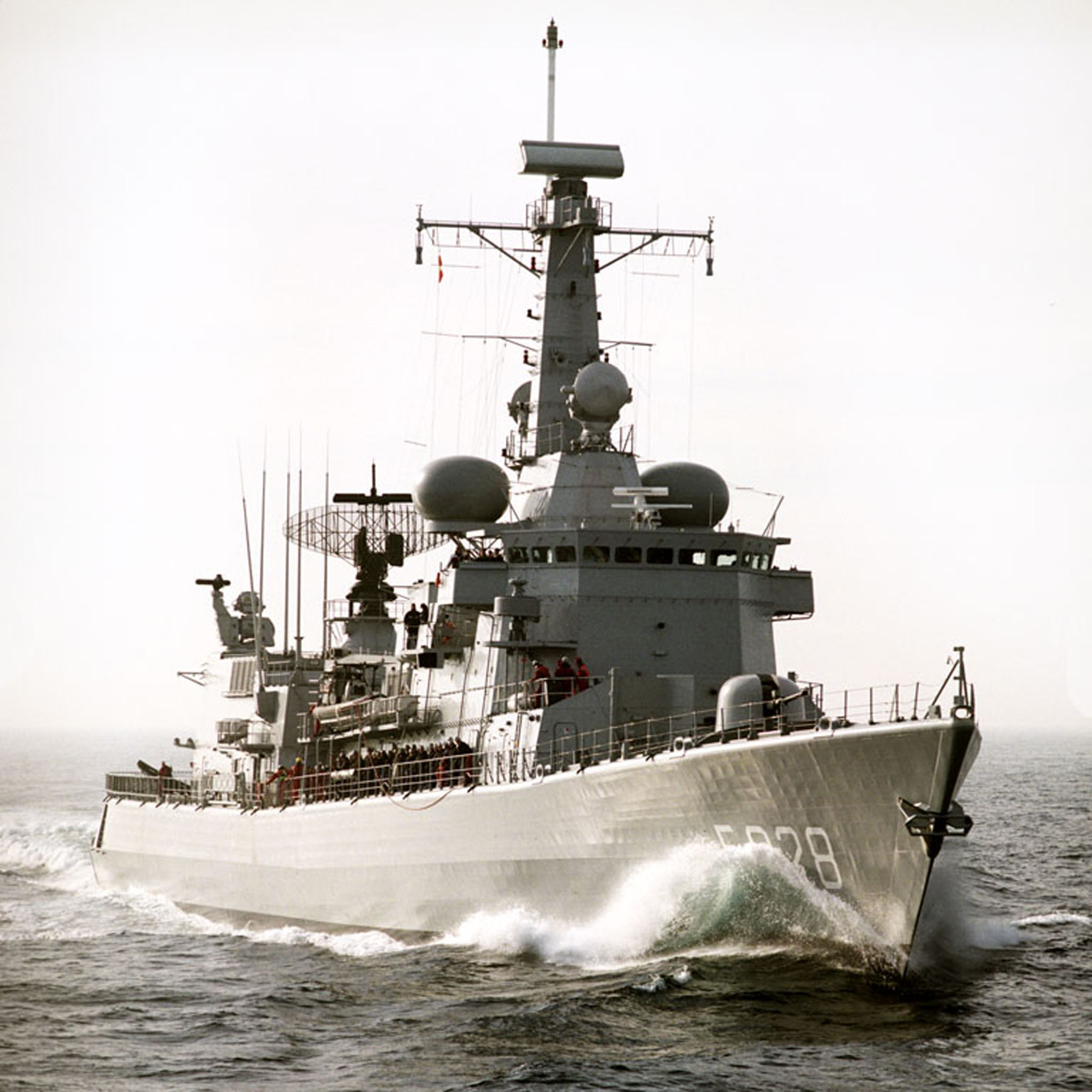
- HNLMS Van Speijk (F828)

History

Netherlands
- Name: HNLMS Van Speijk
- Namesake: Jan van Speyk
- Builder: Koninklijke Maatschappij De Schelde
- Laid down: 1 October 1991
- Launched: 26 March 1994
- Commissioned: 7 September 1995
- Identification: MMSI number: 245962000; Callsign: PAMB
- Status: In maintenance
- Badge

General characteristics
- Class & type: Karel Doorman-class frigate
- Displacement: 2,800 long tons (2,845 t) standard; 3,320 long tons (3,373 t) full load
- Length: 122.25 m (401 ft 1 in) oa; 114.40 m (375 ft 4 in) pp
- Beam: 14.37 m (47 ft 2 in)
- Draught: 6.05 m (19 ft 10 in)
- Propulsion: 2 × Rolls-Royce Spey 1A gas turbines, 48,256 shp (35,984 kW) total; 2 × Stork-Werkspoor diesel engines, 4,225 hp (3.151 MW) each
- Speed: 29 kn (54 km/h) (gas turbines); 21 kn (39 km/h; 24 mph) (diesels)
- Range: 5,000 nmi (9,300 km; 5,800 mi) at 18 kn (33 km/h; 21 mph)
- Endurance: 30 days
- Complement: 154
- Sensors & processing systems: Thales Nederland LW-08 early warning radar; Thales Nederland SMART-S 3-D air-search; SeaWatcher 100 active phased array surface detection and tracking radar; Thales Gatekeeper; Staring Electro-Optic Ship Security System; Thales Scout surface search radar; 2 × Thales STIR-18 fire control radar; Decca 1609/9 navigation radar; PHS-36 active bow sonar
- Electronic warfare & decoys: Thales Vigile APX Radar Electronic Support Measures
- Armament: 1 × Oto Melara 76 mm anti-air/anti-surface gun; 16-cell Mark 48 Vertical Launch System (VLS) – 16 Sea Sparrow missile; 8 × Harpoon anti-ship missiles; 1 × Goalkeeper CIWS (point defence gun); 4 × Mk 32 324 mm torpedo tubes, Mark 46 torpedoes
- Aircraft carried: NH90 NFH (as of 2013) helicopter

HNLMS Van Speijk (F828) is the eighth and last ship in the Karel Doorman class of multi-purpose frigates, used by the Royal Netherlands Navy.

== History ==
Van Speijk was laid down at Schelde Naval Shipbuilding, Vlissingen on 1 October 1991, launched 26 March 1994, and commissioned 7 September 1995.

Starting in 2010 this ship underwent an upgrade program (called 'IPM') and was fitted with new mast section with new sensors like: Seastar (small target radar system) and Gatekeeper, a new combat computer system (Linux based), new computer networks, communication equipment, enlarged helicopter deck to allow the NH90 NFH helicopter to land and many other changes. The biggest visual change is the new, bigger mast custom built by the Navy's maintenance establishment the 'Marinebedrijf'. HNLMS Van Speijk was the first of four ships to get this update, from both Belgian and Dutch Navy. A new towed sonar will be fitted next few years in a new large maintenance period, to replace the older TACTAS towed array system.

She is the seventh ship in the Royal Netherlands Navy to be named after Jan van Speijk, who, during the Belgian Revolution, blew up his ship rather than let it fall into Belgian hands. To honor him the Dutch king decided the Royal Netherlands Navy will always have a ship named after him.

== Service history ==
On 22 December 2017 HNLMS Van Speijk, during its term as stationed ship in the Caribbean part of the Netherlands, intercepted drug smugglers trying to smuggle 500 kilograms (1,100 lb) of cocaine. On New Year's Eve (2017–2018) Van Speijk intercepted 1,600 kilograms (3,500 lb) of cocaine during an operation in the Caribbean region.

HNLMS Van Speijk was laid up from summer 2021 due to staff shortage. Since that time the ship has been mothballed and anchored at the Nieuwe Haven Naval Base. At the end of 2024 it was decided to reactivate Van Speijk and put her back into service in 2026. Before entering service the ship will undergo maintenance and several modifications to make her ready to once again perform as multi-purpose frigate that is specialized in anti-submarine warfare. In addition, the galley will also be modified, which will lead to new technologies being implemented.

== Notable Moments ==
Dutch Clubland music artist Candee Jay filmed "Back For Me" on the ship in 2005.
