= NRP Bartolomeu Dias (F333) =

Portuguese and Dutch naval frigate

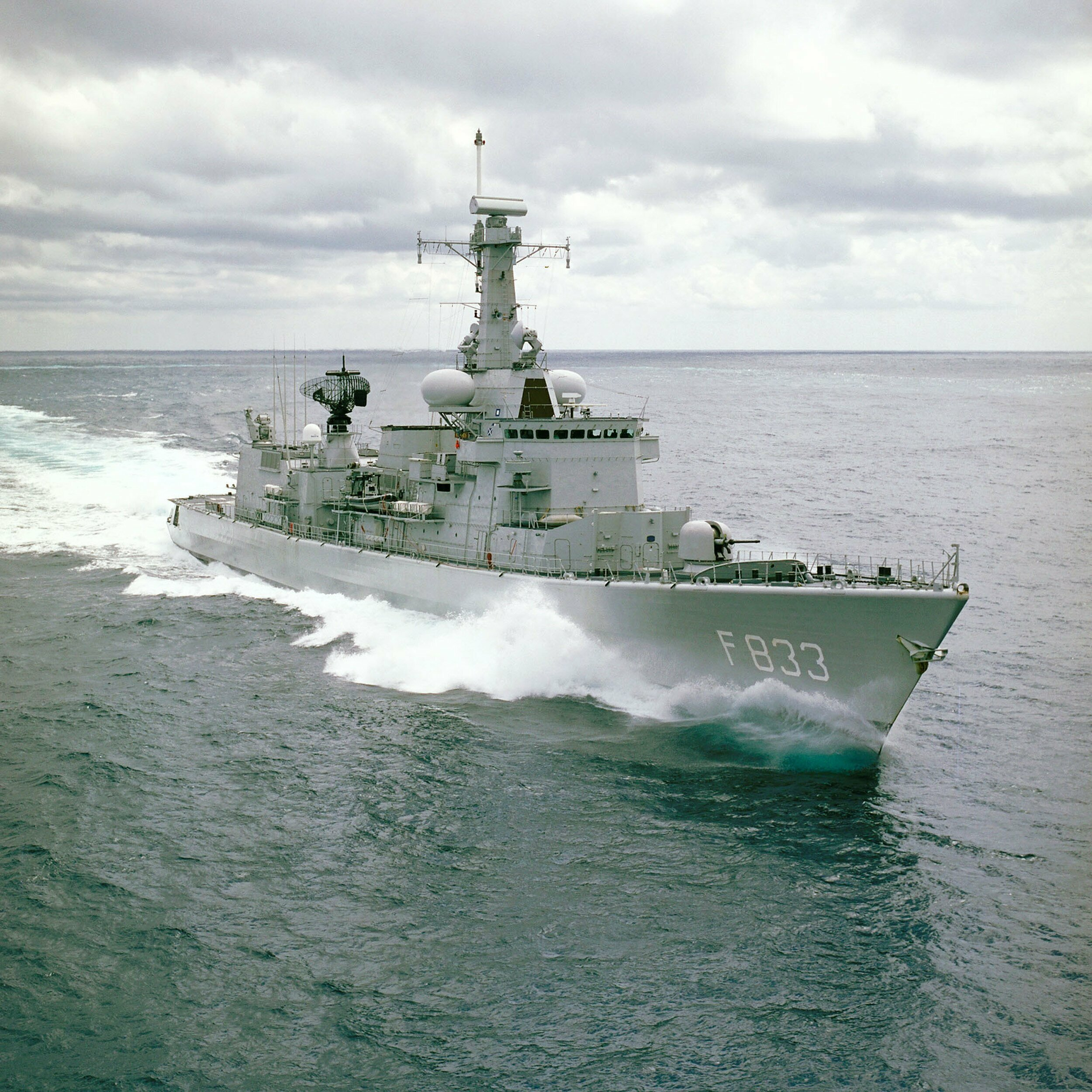
- Van Nes in 2002

History

Netherlands
- Name: Van Nes
- Namesake: Aert Jansse van Nes
- Builder: Koninklijke Schelde Groep, Vlissingen
- Laid down: 10 January 1990
- Launched: 16 May 1992
- Commissioned: 2 June 1994
- Decommissioned: 20 December 2007
- Fate: Transferred to Portuguese Navy

Portugal
- Name: Bartolomeu Dias
- Namesake: Bartolomeu Dias
- Owner: Portuguese Navy
- Acquired: 16 January 2009
- Identification: MMSI number: 26302000; Callsign: CTFM; Hull number: F333
- Status: in active service

General characteristics
- Class & type: Karel Doorman-class frigate / Bartolomeu Dias-class frigate
- Displacement: 3,320 tons
- Length: 122.25 m (401.1 ft)
- Beam: 14.37 m (47.1 ft)
- Draught: 4.3 m (14 ft)
- Propulsion: 2 Rolls-Royce (Spey 1A) 16,700 hp (12.5 MW) gasturbines; 2 Stork-Werkspoor 4,895 hp (3.650 MW) diesel engines
- Speed: 29 kn (54 km/h; 33 mph)
- Complement: 174
- Armament: 1 × Oto Melara 76 mm anti-air/anti-surface gun; 1 × Goalkeeper CIWS (point defence gun); 4 × Mk 32 324 mm torpedo tubes, Mark 46 torpedoes
- Aircraft carried: 1 × helicopter (Super Lynx Mk.95 for Portuguese Navy and Westland Lynx for Royal Netherlands Navy

HNLMS Van Nes (Dutch: Hr.Ms. Van Nes) is a ship of the Karel Doorman class of multi-purpose frigates of the Royal Netherlands Navy where it used the radio call sign was "PAMI". Built by the shipyard Koninklijke Schelde Groep in Vlissingen. The ship is named after the Dutch Admiral Aert Jansse van Nes. She was sold to the Portuguese Navy where the ship was renamed NRP Bartolomeu Dias.

== Dutch service ==
HNLMS Van Nes is one of eight Karel Doorman-class frigates and built at the Koninklijke Schelde Groep yard in Vlissingen. The keel laying took place on 10 January 1990 and the launching on 16 May 1992. The ship was put into service on 2 June 1994.

The ship served in the NATO squadron STANAVFORLANT from 9 October to 31 December 1999 and again in 2001.

Van Nes also took part in Operation Enduring Freedom around the Arabian Peninsula.

On 20 December 2007 the vessel was decommissioned and sold to the Portuguese Navy.

== Portuguese service ==
In May 2018, the Bartolomeu Dias arrived at Den Helder to undergo a mid-life upgrade, which was completed in late 2019.
