= Belgian frigate Louise-Marie =

Belgian Navy frigate, purchased in 2005

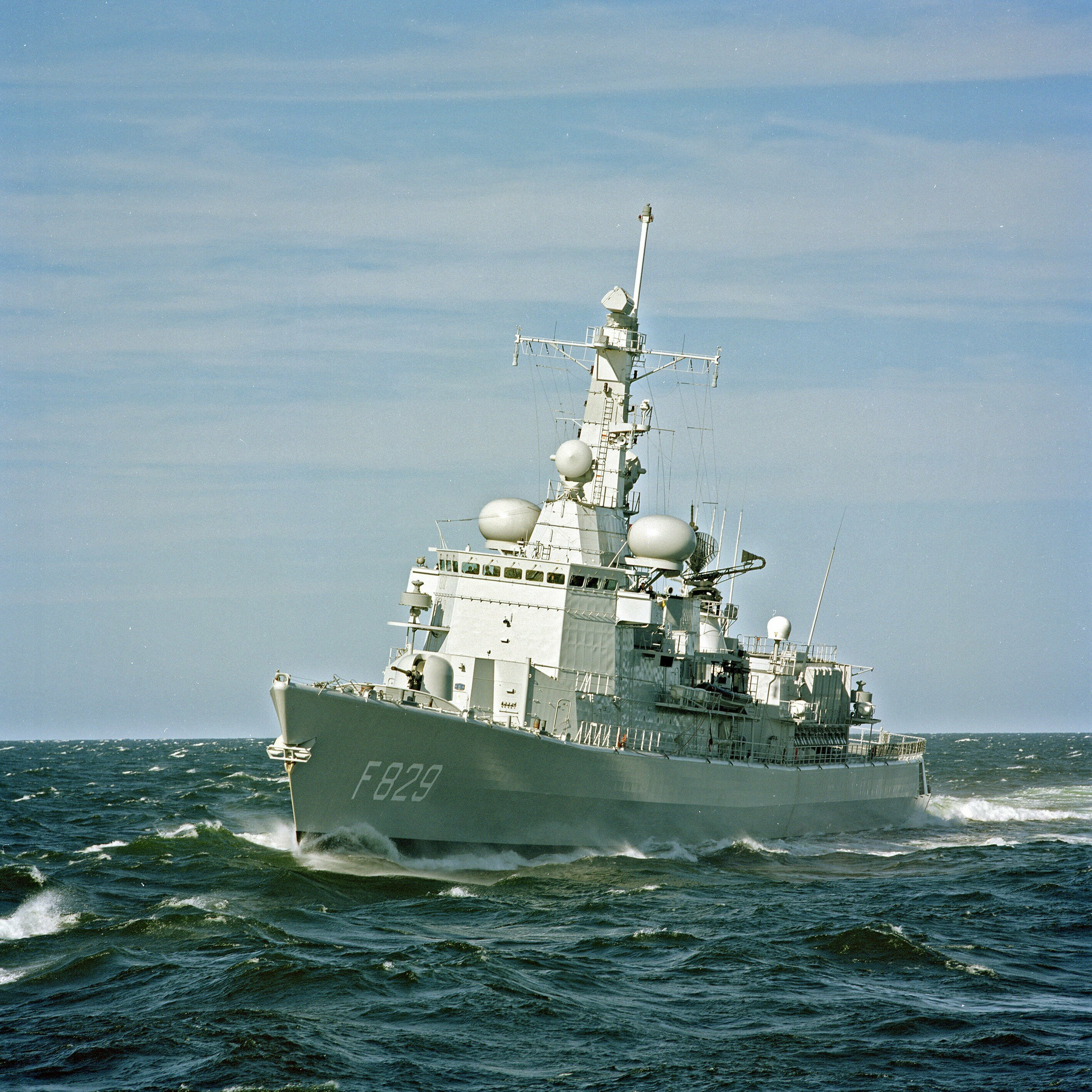
- HNLMS Willem van der Zaan (F829) in 1995

History

Netherlands
- Name: Willem van der Zaan
- Namesake: Schout-bij-nacht Willem van der Zaan
- Builder: Koninklijke Schelde Groep, Flushing (Netherlands)
- Laid down: 6 November 1985
- Launched: 21 January 1989
- Commissioned: 28 November 1991
- Decommissioned: 25 August 2006
- Fate: Sold to Belgium on 22 December 2005

Belgium
- Name: Louise-Marie
- Namesake: Queen Louise-Marie of Belgium
- Christened: 8 April 2008
- Acquired: 22 December 2005
- Commissioned: 8 April 2008
- Home port: Zeebrugge Naval Base
- Identification: MMSI number: 205205000; Callsign: ORJQ
- Status: Active

General characteristics
- Class & type: Karel Doorman-class frigate
- Displacement: 2,800 tonnes
- Length: 122.325 m (401.33 ft)
- Beam: 14.37 m (47.1 ft)
- Draught: 6.2 m (20 ft)
- Speed: 30 knots (56 km/h; 35 mph)
- Complement: 15 officers, 70 NCO's, 60 sailors
- Armament: 16 × RIM-7 Sea Sparrow anti-air VLS; 8 × Boeing Harpoon anti-ship missile; 2–6 × FN MAG 7.62 mm machine gun; 2–4 × Browning M2 12.7 mm machine gun; 2 × Twin-Mark 46 torpedo tubes; 1 × OTO Melara 76 mm gun; 1 × Goalkeeper CIWS
- Aircraft carried: 1 x NH90 NFH helicopter

Louise-Marie (F931) is a Karel Doorman-class frigate of the Belgian Navy of the Belgian Armed Forces that was commissioned in 2008. It is the second of the two frigates of this class that were purchased from the Royal Netherlands Navy on 22 December 2005. It was originally commissioned in 1991 in the Netherlands, where it served as HNLMS Willem van der Zaan (F829).

== Service ==
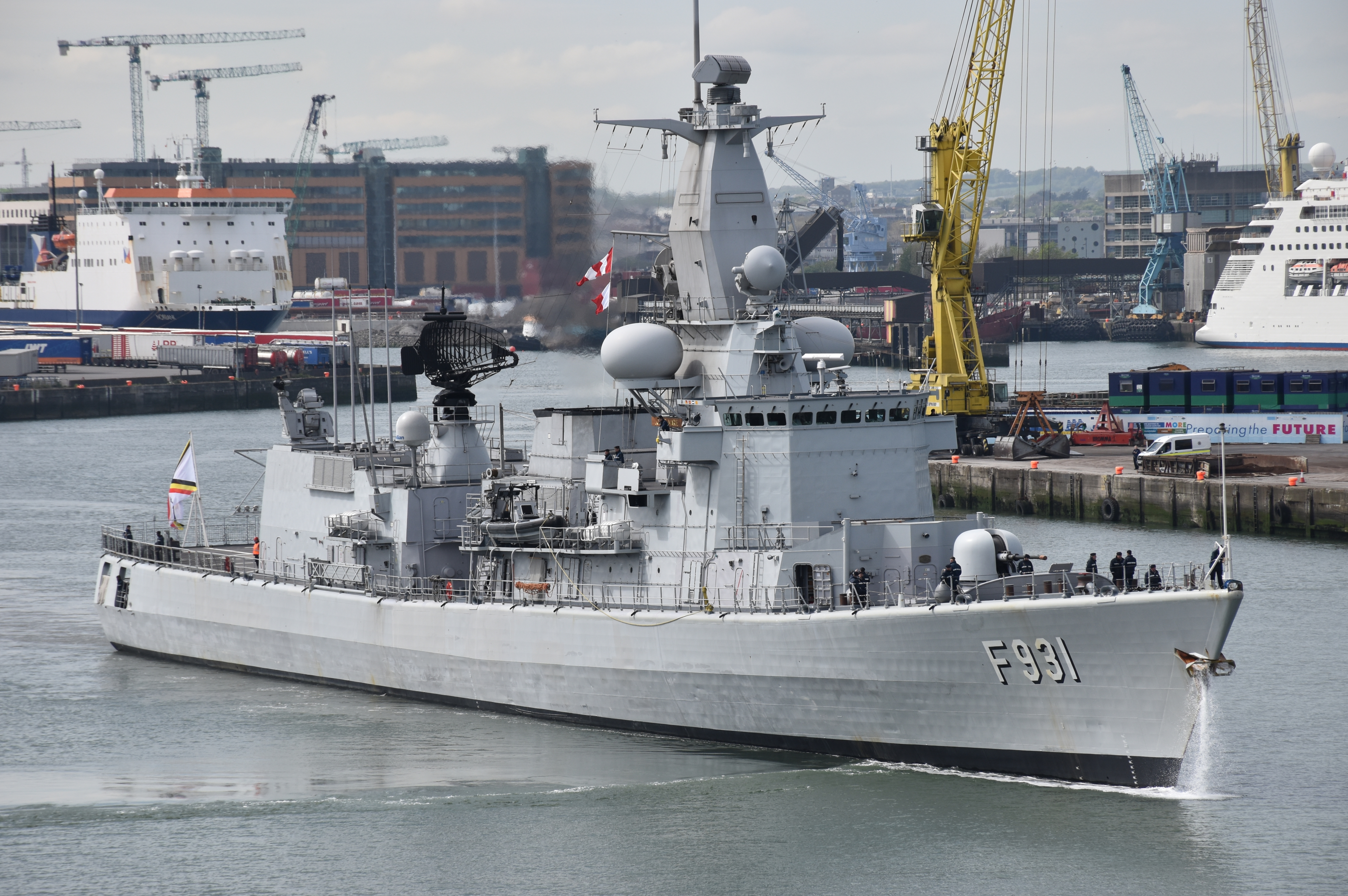
Louise-Marie (F931) in Belgian service

HNLMS Willem van der Zaan was rechristened Louise-Marie (F931) on 8 April 2008 in Antwerp by Queen Paola of Belgium. It was named after Louise-Marie, a naval vessel purchased by the Belgian navy in 1840, which in turn was named after Queen Louise-Marie of Belgium, the wife of Leopold I.

=== Missions ===
In September 2010, Louise-Marie was reported to be preparing for a second deployment to the Horn of Africa.

On 29 November 2013, the ship arrived in London, UK as part of the preparations for the centenary of the start of World War I delivering soil from 70 World War I battlefields collected by British and Belgian schoolchildren for the Flanders Fields Memorial Garden in London's Wellington Barracks.

On January 19, 2024, it was announced the Louise-Marie was being sent to the Red Sea to aid in the EU-led Operation Aspides to protect naval shipping in response to a rise in Houthi attacks on commercial vessels near the coast of Yemen. Scheduled to transit the Suez Canal on April 12, deployment indefinitely postponed due to failed operational and technical tests while transiting the Mediterranean Sea, including an incident where a RIM-7 Sea Sparrow missile was reportedly "stuck" in its launch tube. On 27 April, the issues were resolved and Louise-Marie set course for the area of operations.

== See also ==
- Belgian frigate Leopold I (F930), for the other ship of this class that was sold to Belgium.
