= Karel Doorman-class frigate =

Ship class

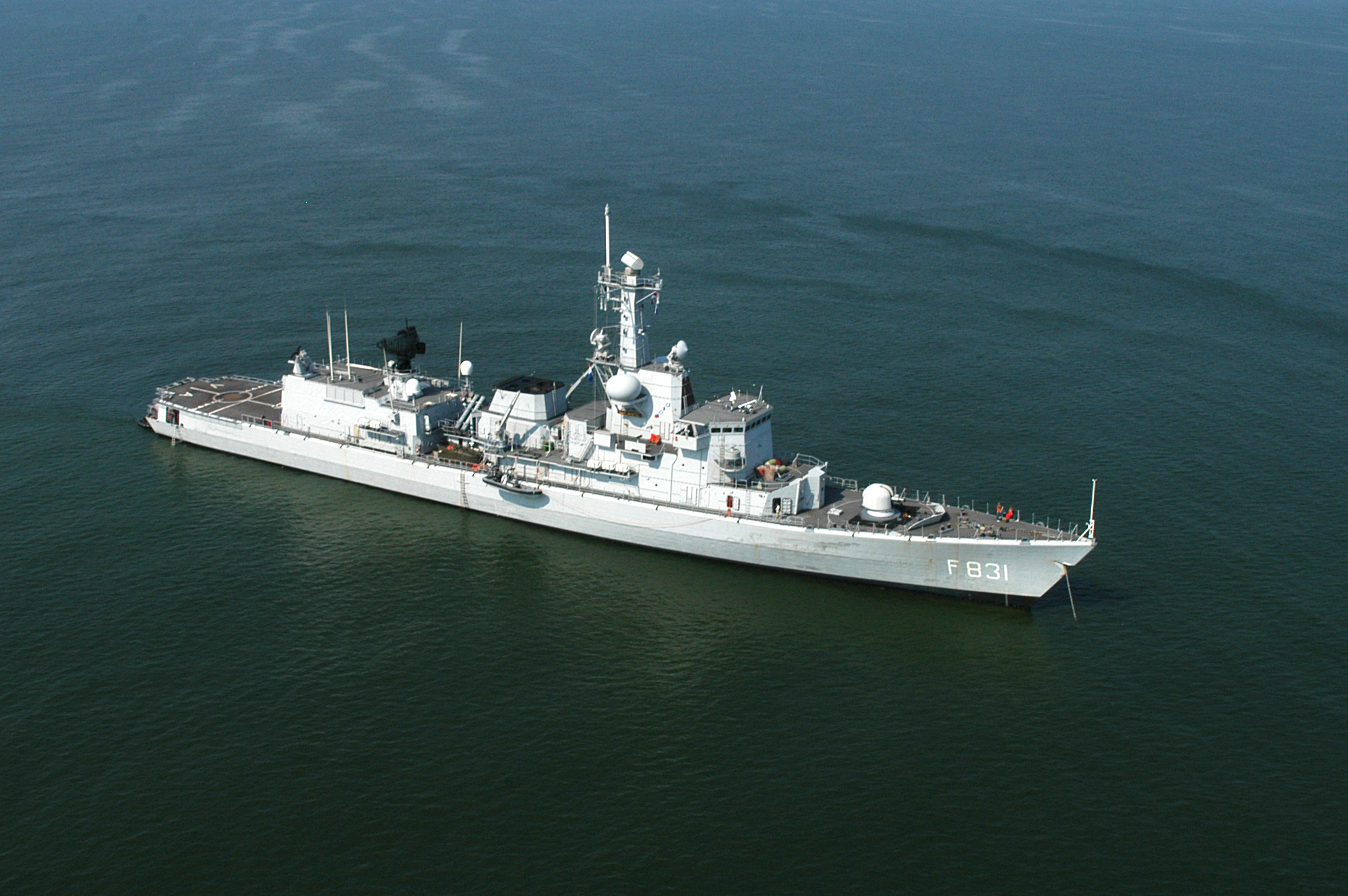
- HNLMS Van Amstel

Class overview
- Name: Karel Doorman class
- Builders: Damen Schelde Naval Shipbuilding
- Operators: Royal Netherlands Navy; Belgian Navy; Chilean Navy; Portuguese Navy
- Preceded by: Netherlands: Kortenaer class / Roofdier class; Belgium: Wielingen class; Portugal: João Belo class
- Succeeded by: Netherlands & Belgium: ASWF class
- Cost: ƒ445 million per unit
- Built: 1985–1995
- In commission: 1991–present
- Completed: 8
- Active: 7
- Laid up: 1

General characteristics
- Type: Multi-purpose frigate
- Displacement: 3,500 tons
- Length: 401 ft (122 m)
- Beam: 47 ft (14 m)
- Draught: 20 ft (6.1 m)
- Propulsion: CODOG-propulsion; 2 × Rolls-Royce Spey 1A, 16,700 hp (12,500 kW) gas turbines; 2 × Stork-Werkspoor 12SW280- 4,895 hp (3,650 kW) + 4 Stork DRO 218K diesel engines
- Speed: 30 knots (56 km/h; 35 mph)
- Complement: 154
- Sensors & processing systems: Thales Smart-S Mk.1 long-range 3D surveillance and tracking radar; Thales LW08 long-range surveillance radar; Thales SeaWatcher 100 active phased array surface detection and tracking radar (NLD and BE ships only); Thales GateKeeper Electro-optical 360° surveillance system (NLD and BE ships only); Thales STIR 1.8 Tracking and Illumination Radar system; Thales Scout surface surveillance and tactical navigation radar; Thales PHS-36 hull-mounted sonar; Thales Anaconda DSBV 61 VLF passive tactical towed array sonar; Ultra Electronics Multi-static Low Frequency Active Passive Sonar (NLD ships only)
- Electronic warfare & decoys: Thales Vigile APX Radar electronic support measures; Mark 36 SRBOC
- Armament: 16 × RIM-7 Sea Sparrow anti-air VLS; 8 × Boeing Harpoon anti-ship missile; 2–6 × FN MAG 7.62 mm machine gun; 2–4 × Browning M2 12.7 mm machine gun; 2 × Twin-Mark 46 torpedo tubes; 1 × OTO Melara 76 mm gun; 1 × Goalkeeper CIWS
- Aviation facilities: Hangar and flight deck

The Karel Doorman-class frigates are a series of eight multi-purpose vessels built for the Royal Netherlands Navy. The class takes its name from the lead ship, whose namesake is Karel Doorman, a Dutch naval officer who went down with his ship at the Battle of the Java Sea in 1942.

== Design history ==
In the 1970s, Dutch naval authorities deemed the Roofdier-class frigates old, outdated, and therefore in need of replacement. As a result, the leadership of the RNLN approved in 1977 the development of a new frigate, which was named Noordzeefregat (English: North Sea frigate). This led to the construction of the Karel Doorman-class frigates in the mid 1980s after the Dutch navy had finalised the design and requirements for the frigates at the end of the 1970s and early 1980s.

The design of the class was made in-house at the Royal Netherlands Navy, in close collaboration with construction site De Schelde in Vlissingen and design agency Nevesbu. For the first time stealth technology was used in the design, such as the sloping walls of the bridge section. Much attention was also paid to the care and facilities for the crew, with more privacy and improved comfort.

The Karel Doorman class were designed as multi-purpose frigates that could perform a wide range of missions. Their armament reflects this by incorporating many features, such as the ability to engage submarines, aircraft and surface vessels. Besides warfare the armaments can also be used to support anti-drug and piracy operations.

First amongst this class to be launched was HNLMS Karel Doorman. Laid down in February 1985 and launched in April 1988, the vessel was commissioned by the Royal Netherlands Navy in May 1991. Karel Doorman was followed by Willem van der Zaan, Tjerk Hiddes, Van Amstel, Abraham van der Hulst, Van Nes, Van Galen, and Van Speijk. Even while the ships were still under construction, Dutch authorities tried, and ultimately failed, to negotiate purchase orders by interested foreign navies. However, six decommissioned Karel Doorman-class frigates were eventually bought by the Belgian, Chilean, and Portuguese navies, and the proceeds were subsequently invested in development of the Holland-class offshore patrol vessel.

== Armament ==
These multi-purpose frigates can be used in the anti-submarine, anti-aircraft, or surface combat roles. Their primary surface armament consists of two quad RGM-84 Harpoon anti-ship launchers with a range of up to 120 kilometres (75 mi). Also available is an OTO Melara 76 mm gun, which has both anti-ship and anti-air capabilities.

Air defence is provided by an AIM-7 Sparrow medium-range semi-active radar homing air-to-air missile with a range of up to 14 kilometres (8.7 mi) Sixteen VLS cells are mounted on the port external bulkhead of the hangar. The Goalkeeper close-in weapon system provides close-range air defence and can fire up to four thousand 30-millimetre (1.2 in) rounds per minute at a range of 200 to 3,000 metres (660 to 9,840 ft).

For anti-submarine warfare, each ship is equipped with two twin torpedo launchers, firing Mark 46 torpedoes; and carries one NH90 NFH or Westland Lynx helicopter. The helicopter is also armed with two Mk 46 torpedoes, and carries dipping sonar and forward-looking infrared systems.

== Modernisation ==
The Royal Netherlands Navy and the Belgian Naval Component decided to upgrade the four frigates by rebuilding both hangar and helicopter deck for the NH90 NFH helicopter as well to replace the forward mast for fitting the new Thales SeaWatcher 100 phased array surface search radar and Gatekeeper electro-optical surveillance system. In addition, they were also equipped with a new Low Frequency Active and Passive Sonar (LFAPS). The first ship to receive the upgrade was Van Speijk in April 2012, next was Leopold I, followed by Van Amstel and Louise Marie is undergoing the modernization. SMART-S 3D search radars will not be replaced by SMART-S MK2.

Seawatcher 100 is a non-rotating active phased array radar for naval surface surveillance. The system automatically detects and tracks asymmetric threats and very small objects such as swimmers and periscopes in all weather conditions. Seastar can also be used for helicopter guidance. Seastar is internationally marketed as Sea Watcher 100

Gatekeeper is a 360-degree panoramic electro-optical surveillance and alerter system based on IR/TV technology. Designed to counter emerging asymmetric threats down to small boats and swimmers, Gatekeeper increases short-range situational awareness in littoral environments.

In 2018 the Portuguese Navy decided to modernize its two Karel Doorman-class frigates (Mid-life update), the first frigate started modernization in 2018 and was delivered in September 2021, the second frigate started modernization in 2020 and was received in October 2022. In November 2024 it was reported that the Portuguese Navy had acquired eight Harpoon Block II conversion kits from the Netherlands. These kits can be used to convert Harpoon Block I missiles to Block II, which the Portuguese Navy can launch from its modernized Karel Doorman-class frigates.

== List of ships ==
Karel Doorman class construction data
Ship	Pennant No.	Named after	Builder	Laid down	Launched	Commissioned	Decommissioned	Fate
Karel Doorman	F827	Karel Doorman	Damen Schelde Naval Shipbuilding	26 February 1985	20 April 1988	31 May 1991	2006	Sold to Belgium
Willem van der Zaan	F829	Willem van der Zaan	Damen Schelde Naval Shipbuilding	6 November 1985	21 January 1989	28 November 1991	25 August 2006	Sold to Belgium
Tjerk Hiddes	F830	Tjerk Hiddes de Vries	Damen Schelde Naval Shipbuilding	28 October 1986	9 December 1989	26 February 1993	3 February 2006	Sold to Chile
Van Amstel	F831	Jan van Amstel	Damen Schelde Naval Shipbuilding	3 May 1987	19 May 1990	27 May 1993		In active service
Abraham van der Hulst	F832	Abraham van der Hulst	Damen Schelde Naval Shipbuilding	8 February 1989	7 September 1991	15 December 1993	2004	Sold to Chile
Van Nes	F833	Aert Jansse van Nes	Damen Schelde Naval Shipbuilding	10 January 1990	16 May 1992	2 June 1994	20 December 2007	Sold to Portugal
Van Galen	F834	Johan van Galen	Damen Schelde Naval Shipbuilding	7 June 1990	21 November 1992	1 December 1994	2009	Sold to Portugal
Van Speijk	F828	Jan van Speyk	Damen Schelde Naval Shipbuilding	1 October 1991	26 March 1994	7 September 1995		In maintenance as of 2025

== Export ==
=== Chile ===
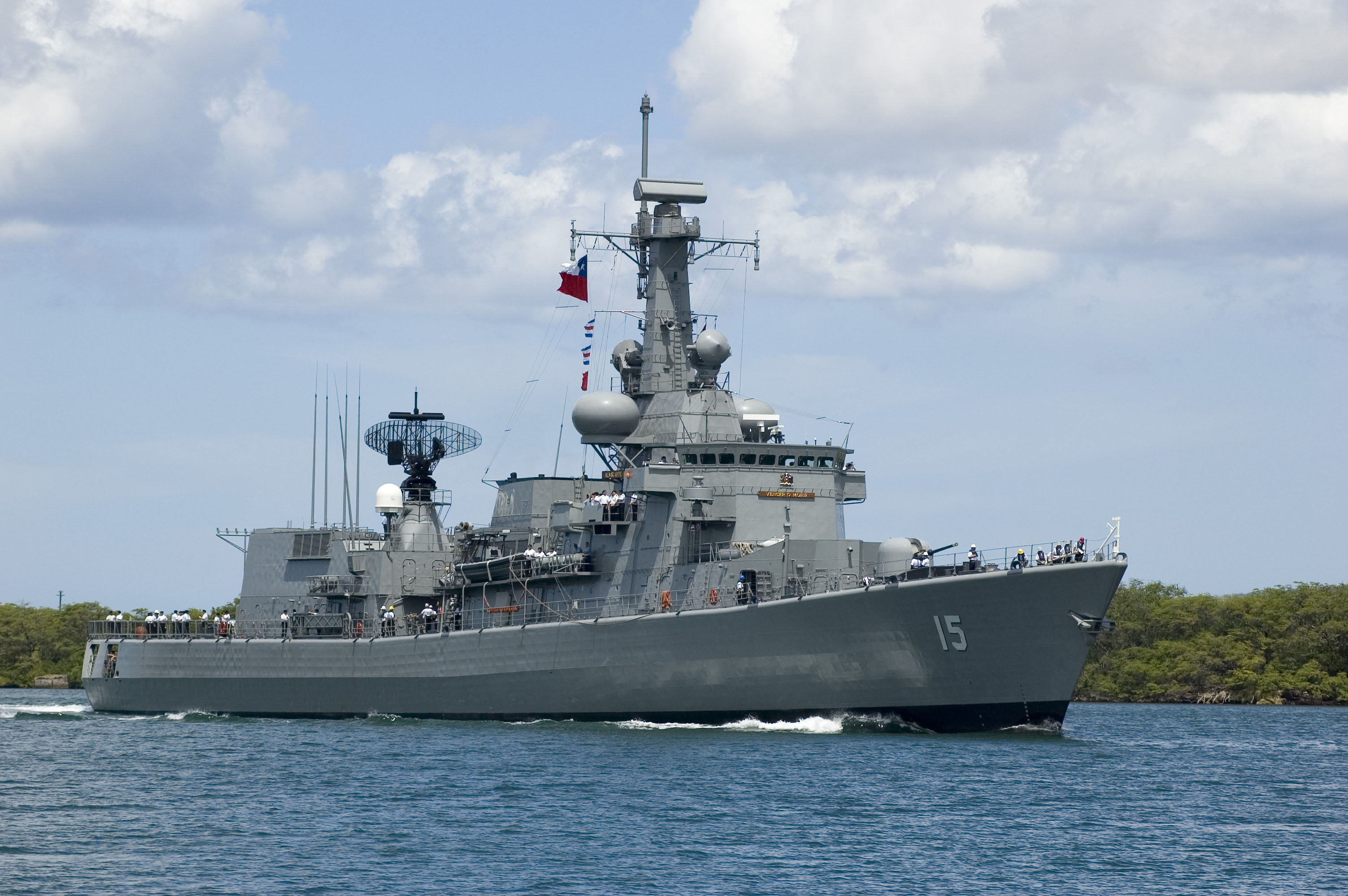
Almirante Blanco Encalada

In 2004 two ships, Tjerk Hiddes and Abraham van der Hulst were sold to Chile and renamed Almirante Riveros (FF-18) and Blanco Encalada (FF-15) respectively. Blanco Encalada commissioned into the Chilean Navy on 16 December 2005, with Almirante Riveros commissioned in April 2007.

Ship	Pennant No.	Named after	Acquired	Commissioned	Decommissioned	Status
Almirante Blanco Encalada	FF-15	Manuel Blanco Encalada	2004	16 December 2005		In active service
Almirante Riveros	FF-18	Galvarino Riveros Cárdenas	3 February 2006	April 2007		In active service

=== Belgium ===
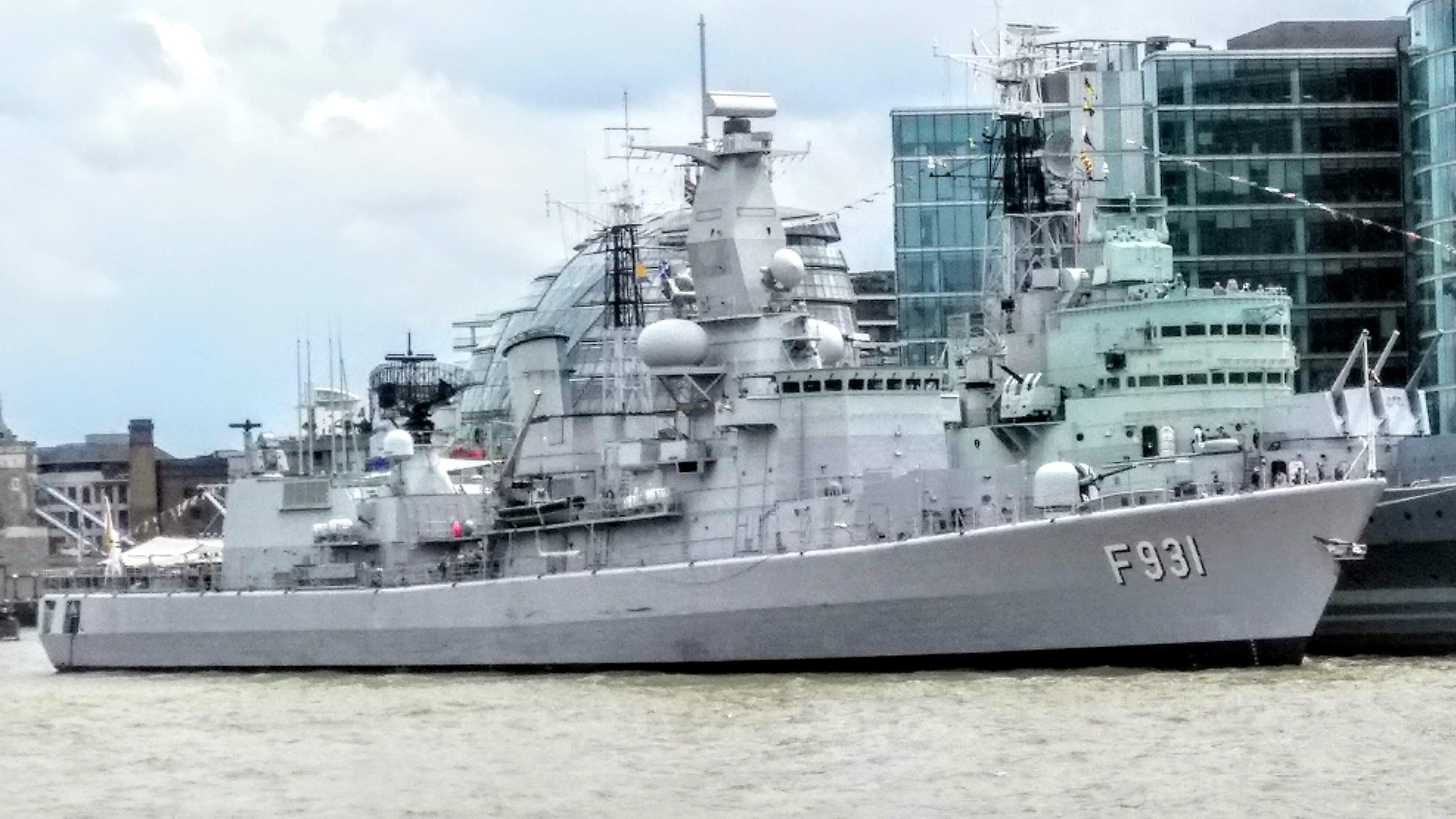
Louise-Marie

On 20 July 2005, the Belgian government decided to buy two of the remaining six Dutch M-class frigates to replace the two remaining frigates of the Wielingen class in service with the Belgian Naval Component, which in turn might be sold to Bulgaria. On 21 December 2005, Karel Doorman and Willem van der Zaan were sold to Belgium and renamed Leopold I (F930) and Louise-Marie (F931) respectively. They were recommissioned between 2007 and 2008.

Ship	Pennant No.	Named after	Acquired	Commissioned	Decommissioned	Status
Leopold I	F930	Leopold I of Belgium	22 December 2005	29 March 2007		In active service
Louise-Marie	F931	Louise of Orléans	22 December 2005	8 April 2008		In active service

=== Portugal ===
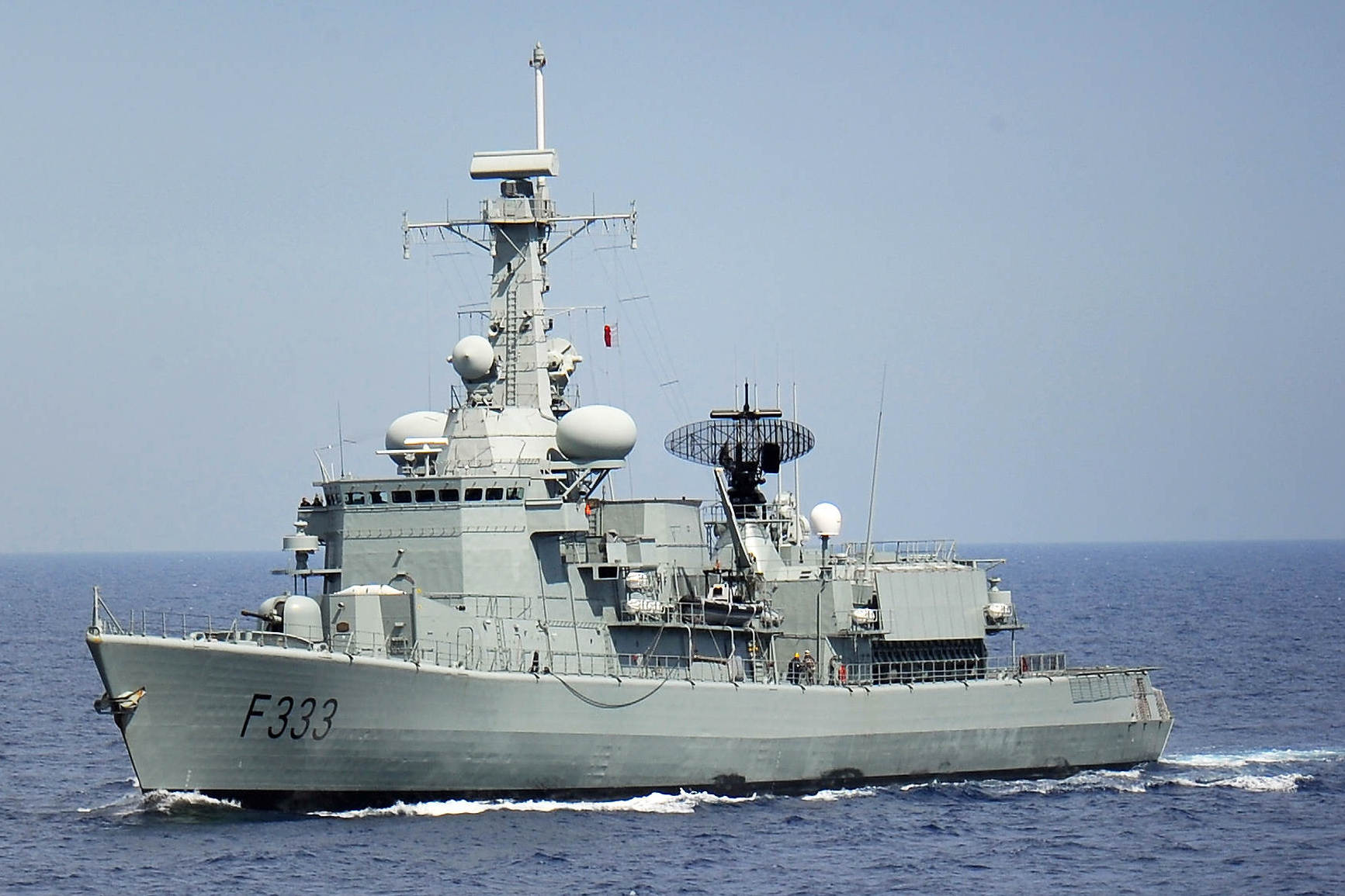
Bartolomeu Dias

In May 2006, Portugal's Defence Minister, Luís Amado, showed interest in buying two Karel Doorman-class frigates to replace the two remaining frigates of the João Belo class in service with the Portuguese Navy — instead of buying two frigates of the Oliver Hazard Perry class, offered by the United States. A committee of the Portuguese government arrived in the Netherlands to evaluate the condition of two frigates to be bought.

On 1 November 2006, the Portuguese Defence Minister Nuno Severiano Teixeira signed a contract for the purchase of the frigates Van Nes and Van Galen. Van Nes, renamed NRP Bartolomeu Dias (F333), was transferred to Portugal on 16 January 2009 and Van Galen, renamed NRP Dom Francisco de Almeida (F334) was transferred on 15 January 2010. With the sale of two M-class frigates to Portugal only two of the eight ships remained with the Royal Netherlands Navy.

Ship	Pennant No.	Named after	Acquired	Commissioned	Decommissioned	Status
Bartolomeu Dias	F333	Bartolomeu Dias	1 November 2006	16 January 2009		In active service
Dom Francisco de Almeida	F334	Francisco de Almeida	1 November 2006	15 January 2010		In active service

== Replacement ==
The two multipurpose M-frigates which are still in service with the Royal Netherlands Navy are reaching the end of their life; they were designed to last until 2018/2023. Because of this the Dutch Ministry of Defence started design studies in 2013. The new frigates are again planned to fulfill a general purpose role with anti-submarine warfare as its specialty. However, since the Netherlands Royal Navy only owns six frigates in total by 2017, the new ships have to be able to perform well in all areas of the spectrum. This means that anti-air equipment also has to be present, in the form of VLS cells carrying Standard Missile 2 or ESSM projectiles. Due to budget cuts, the replacement program was delayed and is now projected to deliver the first ships in 2028–29.

=== First designs ===
In November 2013 on a techbase in Amsterdam a 3D-printed model of one of the designs was shown to the public. The ships were going to be, just like their predecessor, multipurpose-frigates with anti-submarine being the main task. This new class is going to have an integrated mast made by Thales Nederland; the ships of the Holland class did also get this type of mast. At first this new class was to be replacing the Karel Doorman-class vessels in 2020; however, Minister of Defence Jeanine Hennis-Plasschaert had changed this date to 2023. This was subsequently further pushed back to the end of the decade.

By 2017, it was made clear the new Future Surface Combatant (Koninklijke Marine) will be developed in cooperation with the Belgian Marine Component and at least four vessels are to be built (two for the Royal Dutch Navy and two for the Belgian Marine Component), with the possibility more will be ordered as soon as the acquisition procedure reaches a more definitive phase.

== See also ==
- List of frigate classes in service

Equivalent frigates of the same era

- Brandenburg class
- Halifax class
- Anzac class
- Type 23
- Vasco da Gama class
- Neustrashimy class
- G class
- Kang Ding class
