= Goalkeeper CIWS =

Close-in weapon system

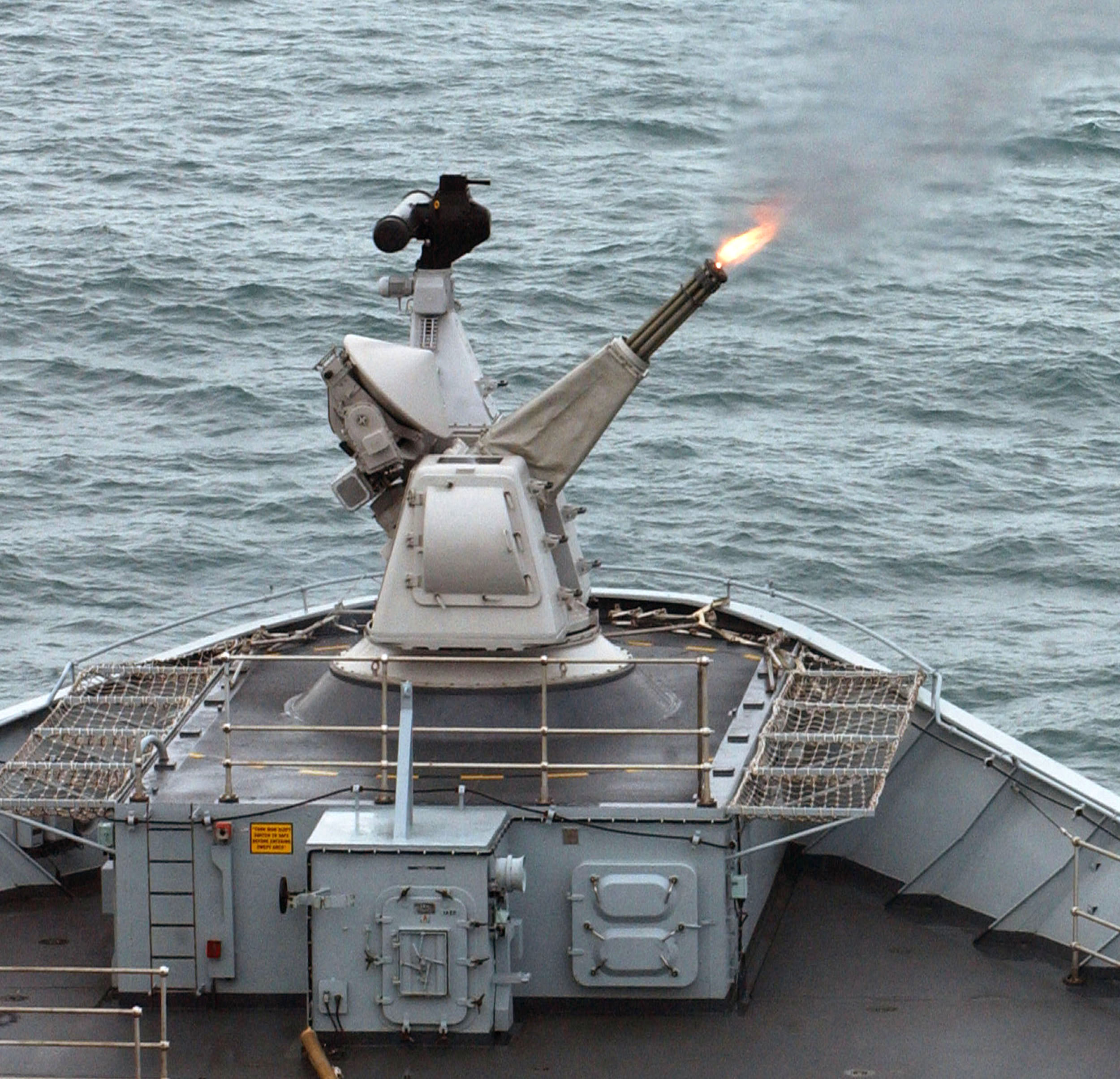
- A Goalkeeper CIWS on a British Invincible-class aircraft carrier firing at a target
- Type: Close-in weapon system
- Place of origin: Netherlands

Service history
- In service: 1980–present
- Used by: See operators

Production history
- Designer: Signaal (now Thales Nederland)
- Designed: 1975
- Manufacturer: Thales Naval Netherlands
- Produced: 1979

Specifications
- Mass: 6,372 kg (14,048 lb) with 1,190 rds of ammunition (above deck); 9,902 kg (21,830 lb) (total).
- Height: 3.71 m (above deck) 6.2 m (including deck penetration).
- Crew: Automated, with human oversight
- Shell: 30×173mm TP, HEI, MPDS, or FMPDS
- Caliber: 30 mm (1.2 in)
- Barrels: 7-barrel (progressive RH parabolic twist, 14 grooves)
- Elevation: +85 to −25 degrees at 80 degree/s
- Traverse: Unlimited
- Rate of fire: 70 rounds/second (4,200 rounds/minute)
- Muzzle velocity: 1,109 m/s (MPDS round)
- Effective firing range: 350 to between 1,500 and 2,000 metres dependent on ammunition
- Main armament: 1 x 30 mm (1.2 in) GAU-8/A Avenger seven-barrel rotary cannon

The Goalkeeper CIWS is a Dutch close-in weapon system (CIWS) introduced in 1979. It is an autonomous and completely automatic weapon system for short-range defence of ships against highly maneuverable missiles, aircraft and fast-maneuvering surface vessels. Once activated the system automatically undertakes the entire air defence process from surveillance and detection to destruction, including the selection of the next priority target.

== Development ==
Hollandse Signaalapparaten B.V., in short Hollandse Signaal or Signaal (now Thales Nederland) began work on the Goalkeeper in 1975, developing it around the GAU-8 gun. A prototype, the EX-83, was first demonstrated to the Royal Netherlands Navy in 1979.

In 2012, the Dutch ministry of defense announced that the Goalkeeper systems in use by the Netherlands Navy will receive radar upgrades, mechanical improvements, new high-precision frangible ammunition and a new electro-optical tracking system. Also, the system's surface model will be improved to counter high-speed boats and fast attack craft. These upgrades will make the system more capable to defend ships against the latest threats such as modern anti-ship missiles, more effective in littoral environments and less vulnerable to malfunctions. It also expands the life of the system to at least 2025. The first of 16 systems will be upgraded and tested by Thales Nederland, the others at the naval base in Den Helder. The upgrade has been named the Upkeep Modification.

The development of the Upkeep Modification did not go smoothly. The costs associated with the upgrade rose 700,000 euro above the planned budget in 2015, and led to a loss for Thales Nederland in that year. Nonetheless, by 2016 the first upgrade was completed and placed aboard the HNLMS Evertsen for testing purposes. The newly upgraded Goalkeeper system brings numerous improvements and additions to the system, including new color and infrared cameras, a new control panel, new software and computers, and the ability to let several Goalkeeper systems work with each other simultaneously.

In March 2018, the upgraded Goalkeeper CIWS passed the sea acceptance trial flawlessly. The Upkeep Modification is meant to bring the performance of the Goalkeeper system once again to the highest operational status, in correspondence with the Royal Netherlands Navy's ambition to optimally protect its crew and ships during overseas deployments.

== Description ==
=== Target selection ===
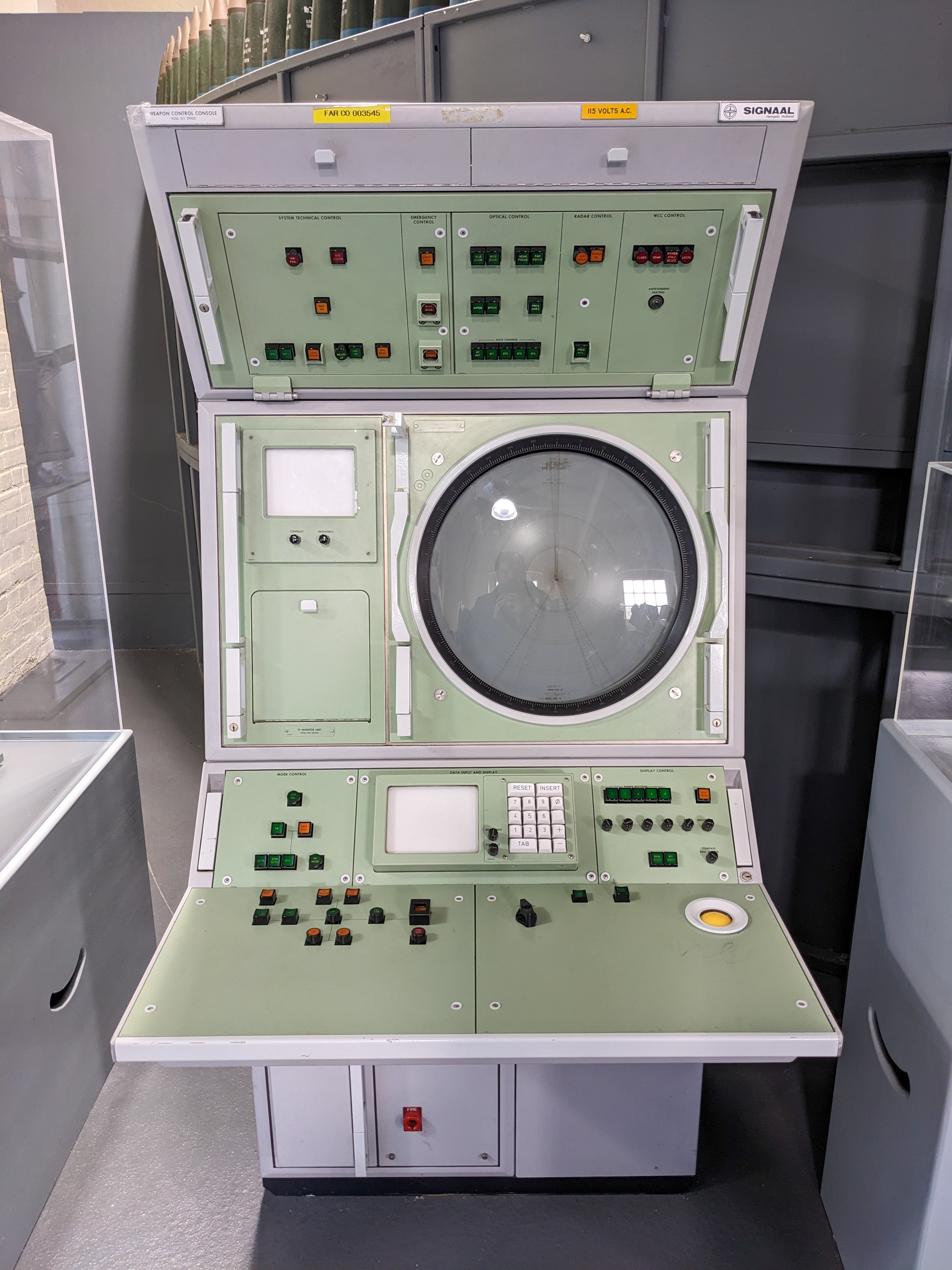
Goalkeeper system control console, on display at Explosion Museum of Naval Firepower

The Goalkeeper has two radar sub-systems, one to find threats and another to track and engage them, which operate together to identify and prioritise targets and engage the highest priority one.

The 2D I band search radar, which can handle up to 18 targets at once, generates a threat picture which the gun system uses to identify and prioritize threats. The system has identify friend or foe (IFF) functionality to rule out friendly traces. The tracking radar operates in both I band and K band to enable quick acquisition on the threat bearing. Data from both the I band and K band return signals indicate target range and can be used to identify, and respond to the use of, electronic countermeasures (ECM). The dual-band system also reduces the effect of clutter, which can mask the target at low altitude. A camera system on the assembly provides a visual fall-back for the system operator.

=== Target engagement ===
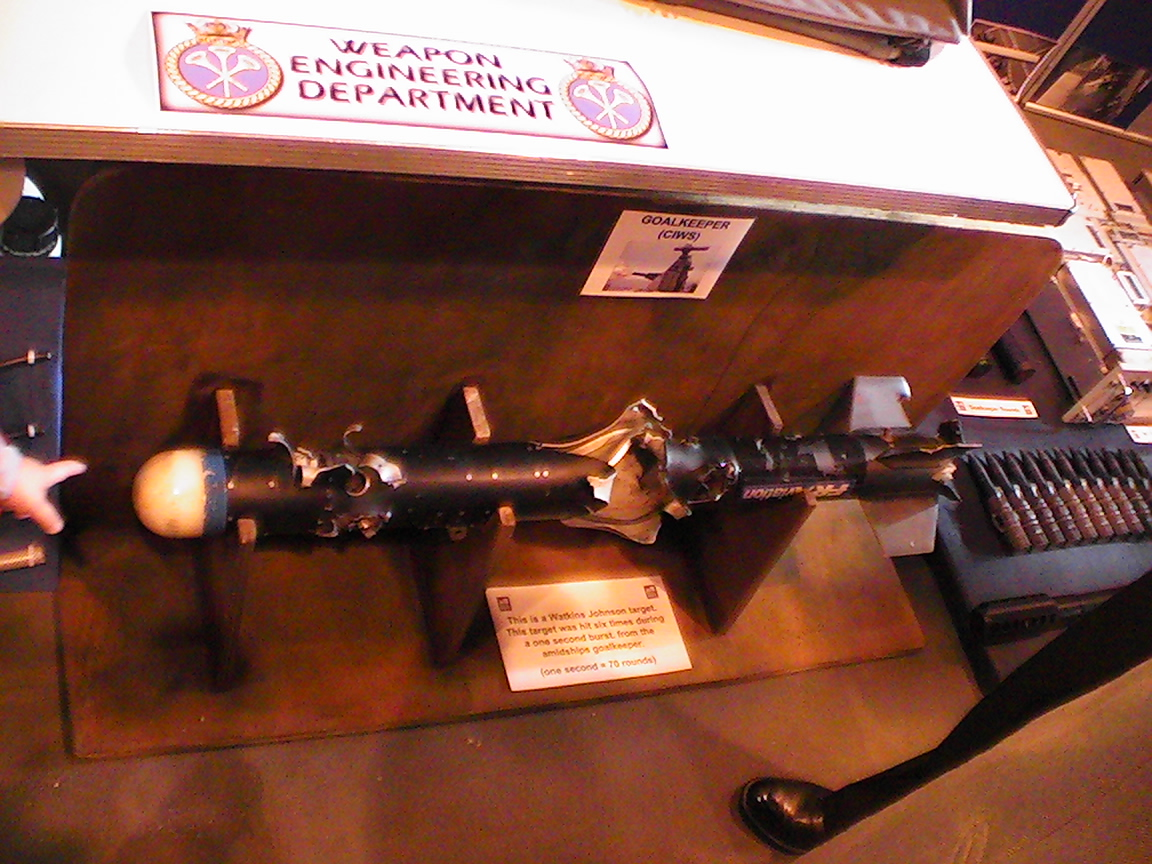
A target hit by the Goalkeeper. This target was hit six times in a one-second burst of 70 rounds.

The GAU-8/A Avenger 30 mm, also used by the A-10 Thunderbolt II aircraft, was selected for the system. The 30x173mm cartridge has a greater projectile mass than the 20x102mm cartridge fired by the Phalanx CIWS M61 Vulcan, so it provides much greater destructive power and significantly increased range with similar muzzle velocity.

The 30x173mm MPDS cartridge has a discarding nylon sleeve (sabot) with a 21 mm sub-calibre tungsten penetrator. The nylon sabot provides a seal between penetrator and barrel and reduces wear.

The tracking radar is capable of monitoring the line of fire and commanding minor adjustments.

Supersonic missiles that are damaged may still have enough momentum to hit the ship—the only way to ensure the protection of the ship is either to detonate the warhead of the missile or obliterate the missile.

The system's reaction time to a Mach 2 sea-skimming missile such as the Russian SS-N-22 Sunburn from automatic detection to kill is reported to be 5.5 seconds with the firing synchronized to start the engagement at a range of 1,500 m and ending with a kill at 300 m.

=== Operational history ===
Goalkeeper's capabilities have been proven many times during sea-going trials. During live-fire exercises, many different targets including Harpoons, Exocets and target drones were shot down by Goalkeeper. During anti-piracy operations off the coast of Somalia the system destroyed several pirate boats and skiffs that had been seized by the Royal Netherlands Navy.

=== Comparison with other current CIWS ===
Model	(Netherlands) Goalkeeper CIWS	(Russia) AK-630	(Russia) AK-630M1-2	(United States) Phalanx CIWS	(Italy) DARDO	(China) Type 730	(China) Type 1130
Mass	9,902 kg (21,830 lb)	9,114 kg (20,093 lb)	11,819 kg (26,056 lb)	6,200 kg (13,700 lb)	5,500 kg (12,100 lb)	6,372 kg (14,048 lb) w/o ammo	7,400 kg (16,300 lb) w/o ammo
Ammunition	30 mm (1.2 in)	30 mm (1.2 in)	30 mm (1.2 in)	20 mm (0.79 in)	40 mm (1.6 in)	30 mm (1.2 in)	30 mm (1.2 in)
Armament	7-barreled GAU-8 Avenger Gatling gun	6-barreled GSh-6-30 Gatling gun	2 × 6-barreled GSh-6-30 Gatling gun	6-barreled M61 Vulcan Gatling gun	2-barreled Bofors 40 mm	7-barreled H/PJ-12 Gatling gun	11-barreled H/PJ-11 Gatling gun
Rate of fire	4,200 rpm	5,000 rpm	10,000 rpm	4,500 rpm	600/900 rpm	5,800 rpm	11,000 rpm
Range (effective/ flat-trajectory)	3,500 m (11,500 ft)	4,000 m (13,000 ft)	4,000 m (13,000 ft)	2,600 m (8,500 ft)	4,000 m (13,000 ft)	5,000 m (16,000 ft)	5,000 m (16,000 ft)
Ammunition storage (rounds)	1,190	2,000	4,000	1,550	736	1,280	2,560
Muzzle velocity	1,109 m/s (3,640 ft/s)	900 m/s (3,000 ft/s)	900 m/s (3,000 ft/s)	1,100 m/s (3,600 ft/s)	1,000 m/s (3,300 ft/s)	1,150 m/s (3,800 ft/s)	1,150 m/s (3,800 ft/s)
Elevation	−25 to +85°	−12 to +88°	−12 to +88°	−25 to +85°	−13 to +85°	-25 to +85°	-25 to +85°
Traverse	360°	360°	360°	-150° to +150°	360°	360°	360°

== Specifications ==
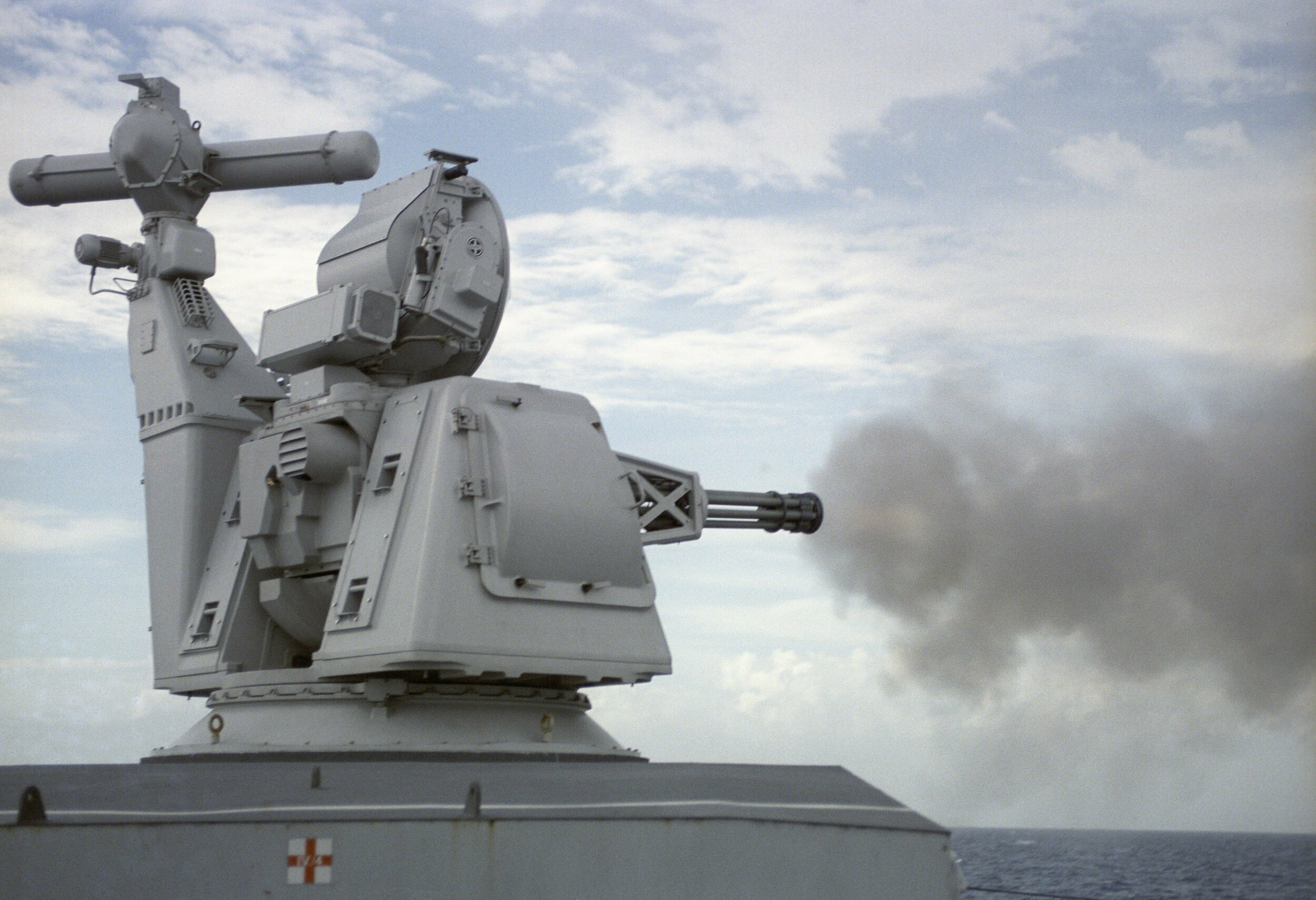
Goalkeeper firing.

- Gun: GAU-8/A Avenger 30 mm seven-barrel rotary cannon.
- Height: 3.71 m (above deck) 6.2 m (including deck penetration).
- Weight: 6,372 kg with 1,190 rds of ammunition (above deck), 9,902 kg (total).
- Elevation +85° to −25° at 80°/s.
- Muzzle velocity: 1,109 m/s (MPDS round).
- Rotation speed 360° in 3.8 seconds
- Rate of fire: 70 rounds/second (4,200 rounds/minute).
- Maximum burst size: 1,000 rounds.
- Ammunition: 1,190 linkless (HEI, API, TP, MPDS, FMPDS) rounds in a below-deck magazine.
- Reload time: 9 minutes (loading is done below deck)
- Weapons range: 350 to between 1,500 and 2,000 meters dependent on ammunition.
- Search radar: I band/linear array. I band is X band. Beamsize 1.5 degrees horizontal, 60 degrees vertical. Rotates at 1 Hz (60 RPM). Range approx. 30 km.
- Engagement radar: I band and K band monopulse cassegrain.
- Optical system: TV (Future EO/IR)
- 100% kill distance: 500 m

== Operators ==
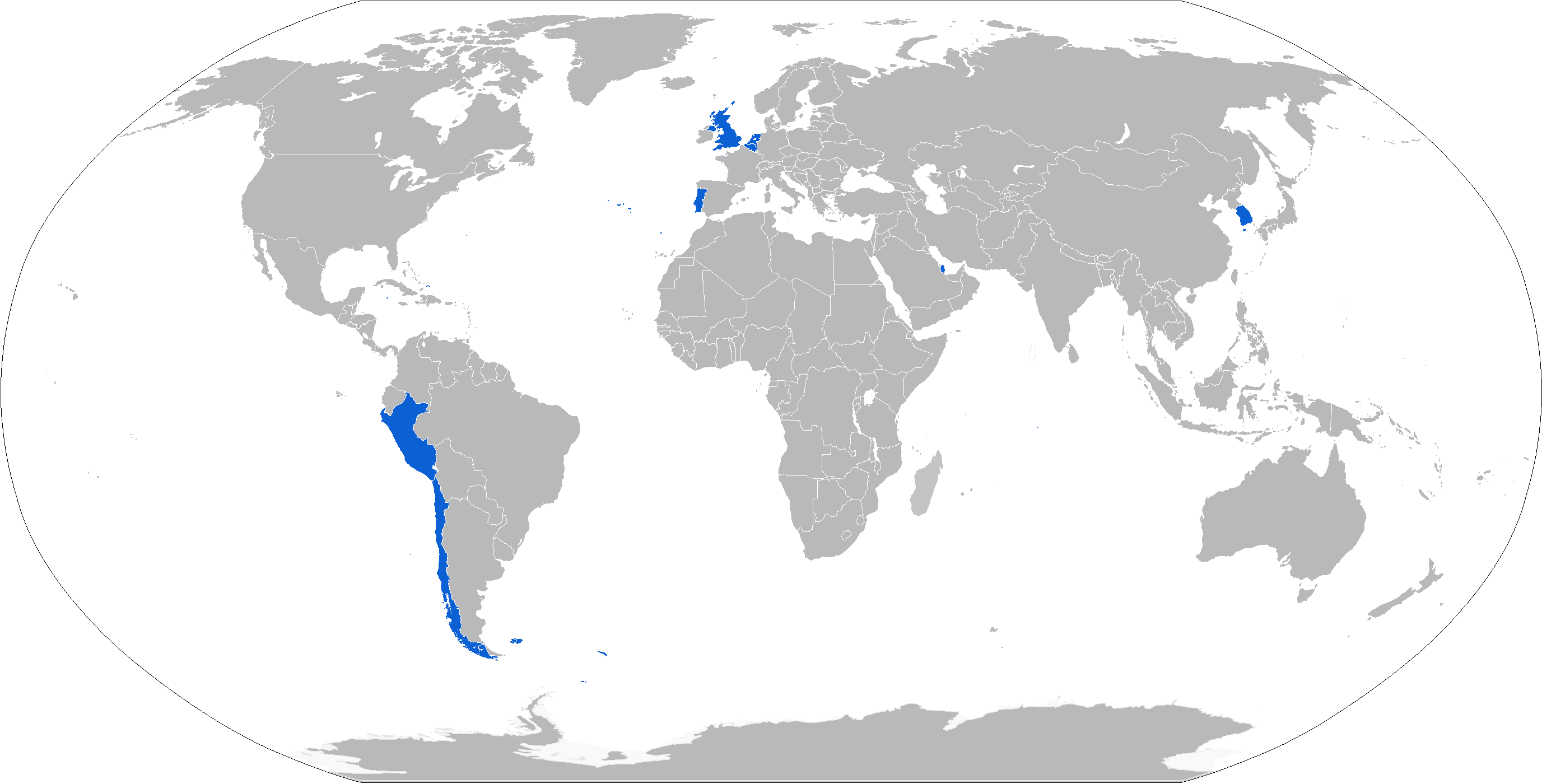
Map of Goalkeeper operators in blue

=== Current operators ===
- Belgium: Belgian Navy
  - 2 Karel Doorman-class frigates
- Chile: Chilean Navy
  - 2 Jacob van Heemskerck-class air defence frigates
  - 2 Karel Doorman-class frigates
- Netherlands: Royal Netherlands Navy
  - 4 De Zeven Provinciën-class air-defence and command frigates, 1 or 2 Goalkeepers per ship (Only one vessel of this class is fitted with 2 Goalkeepers, others are provisioned)
  - 2 Karel Doorman-class frigates, 1 Goalkeeper per ship
  - 2 Rotterdam-class landing platform docks, 2 Goalkeepers per ship
  - 1 Karel Doorman-class support ship, 2 Goalkeepers (in service 2015)
- Peru: Peruvian Navy
  - 1 BAP Tacna Replenishment Oiler, as of 2015
- Portugal: Portuguese Navy
  - 2 Karel Doorman-class frigates
- Qatar: Qatar Armed Forces
  - 4 Vosper Thornycroft Vita-class
- South Korea: Republic of Korea Navy
  - 3 Gwanggaeto the Great-class destroyers
  - 6 Chungmugong Yi Sun-sin-class destroyers
  - 3 Sejong the Great-class destroyers
  - 2 Dokdo-class amphibious assault ship

=== Former operators ===
- United Kingdom: Royal Navy
  - Formerly fitted to two Invincible-class aircraft carriers (HMS Invincible & HMS Illustrious), two Albion-class landing platform dock (replaced by "Phalanx" on HMS Albion, removed from HMS Bulwark while in extended readiness for eventual replacement with "Phalanx") and four Type 22 Batch 3 frigates
- Germany: German Navy
  - Formerly fitted to frigate Karlsruhe during her service in the Adriatic Sea in the mid-1990s, later replaced by a RIM-116 Rolling Airframe Missile system
