= HNLMS Pieter Florisz (F826) =

Ship used in the navy

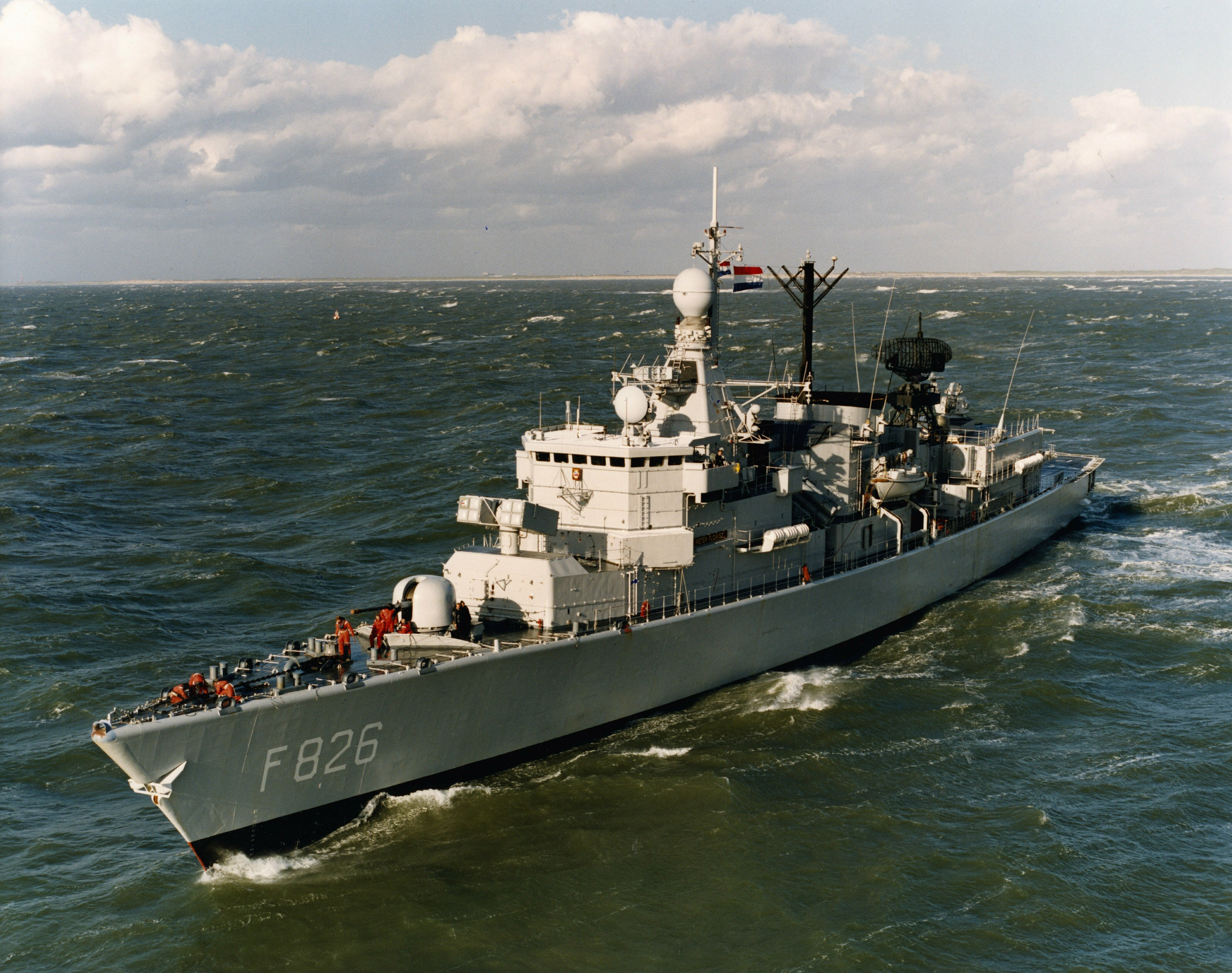
- HNLMS Pieter Florisz in 1990

History

Netherlands
- Name: Pieter Florisz
- Namesake: Pieter Floriszoon
- Builder: KM de Schelde, Vlissingen
- Laid down: 21 January 1981
- Launched: 8 May 1982
- Commissioned: 11 October 1983
- Decommissioned: 2001
- Fate: Sold to the Hellenic Navy, 2001

Greece
- Name: Bouboulina
- Acquired: 2001
- Commissioned: 14 December 2001
- Decommissioned: 18 February 2013
- Identification: F463
- Fate: Used as a training target and sunk on 21 October 2026.

General characteristics
- Class & type: Kortenaer-class frigate
- Displacement: 3,500 long tons (3,600 t) standard; 3,800 long tons (3,900 t) full load
- Length: 130 m (426 ft 6 in)
- Beam: 14.4 m (47 ft 3 in)
- Draft: 4.4 m (14 ft 5 in)
- Propulsion: Combined gas or gas (COGOG) system: 2 × Rolls-Royce Tyne RM1C gas turbines, 4,900 shp (3,700 kW) each; 2 × Rolls-Royce Olympus TM3B gas turbines, 25,700 shp (19,200 kW) each (boost); 2 shafts
- Speed: 20 knots (37 km/h; 23 mph) cruise; 30 knots (56 km/h; 35 mph) maximum
- Endurance: 4,700 nautical miles at 16 knots (8,700 km at 30 km/h)
- Complement: 176–196
- Armament: 2 × OTO-Melara Compatto 76 mm/62 cal. gun; 2 × twin Mk46 torpedo tubes; 2 × quad RGM-84 Harpoon anti-ship missile launchers; 1 × 8-cell Sea Sparrow anti-aircraft missile launchers; 1 × Goalkeeper in Dutch service; 1 × Phalanx in Greek service
- Aircraft carried: 2 × Sea Lynx helicopters (1 in peacetime)

HNLMS Pieter Florisz (F826) (Dutch: Hr.Ms. Pieter Florisz) was a frigate of the Kortenaer class. The ship was in service with the Royal Netherlands Navy from 1983-2001. She was named after Dutch naval hero Pieter Floriszoon, and her radio call sign was "PADI".

== Dutch service history ==
HNLMS Pieter Florisz was built at KM de Schelde in Vlissingen originally and to be named Willem van der Zaan. However, she was renamed after the ship intended to be named Pieter Florisz was sold (during construction) to Greece. The keel laying took place on 21 January 1981, and she was launched on 8 May 1982. The ship was put into service on 11 October 1983.

Pieter Florisz and Witte de With participated in the Gulf War and were replaced by Philips van Almonde, Jacob van Heemskerck and the replenishment ship Zuiderkruis, on 4 and 5 December 1990.

In June 1994, the ship participated in the BALTOPS 94 naval exercise with vessels from several other navies.

In 2001, the vessel was decommissioned and sold to the Hellenic Navy.

== Greek service history ==
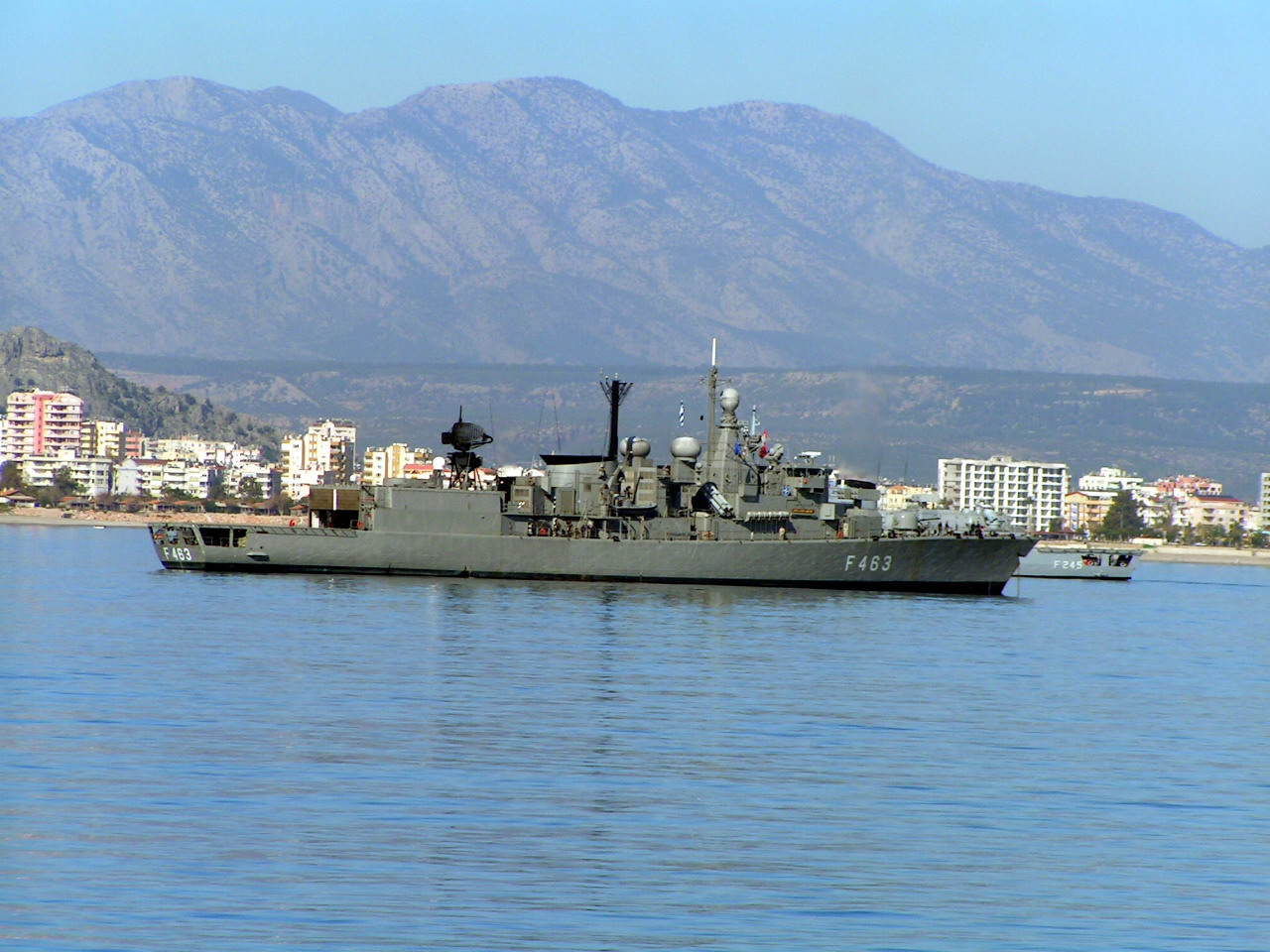
Bouboulina in 2006

The ship was transferred in 2001 to the Hellenic Navy, where the she was renamed Bouboulina using the radio call sign "SZCQ".

On 13 October 2026 it was reported that Bouboulina was towed from the naval port near Athens. She was sunk on 21 October 2026 during a SINKEX.
