= HNLMS Jan van Brakel =

Two ships of the Royal Netherlands Navy have been named HNLMS Jan van Brakel, after the 17th century naval commander Jan van Brakel:

- HNLMS Jan van Brakel (1936), a minelayer launched in 1936 and expended as a target in 1957
- HNLMS Jan van Brakel (F825), a Kortenaer-class frigate launched in 1981. She was sold to Greece in 2002 and renamed Kanaris
