= Van Brakel =

Van Brakel may refer to:

== People ==
- Jan van Brakel (1638–1690), Dutch rear-admiral
- Nouchka van Brakel, Dutch film director

== Other ==
- HNLMS Jan van Brakel (F825), Dutch naval frigate
