= HNLMS Philips van Almonde (F823) =

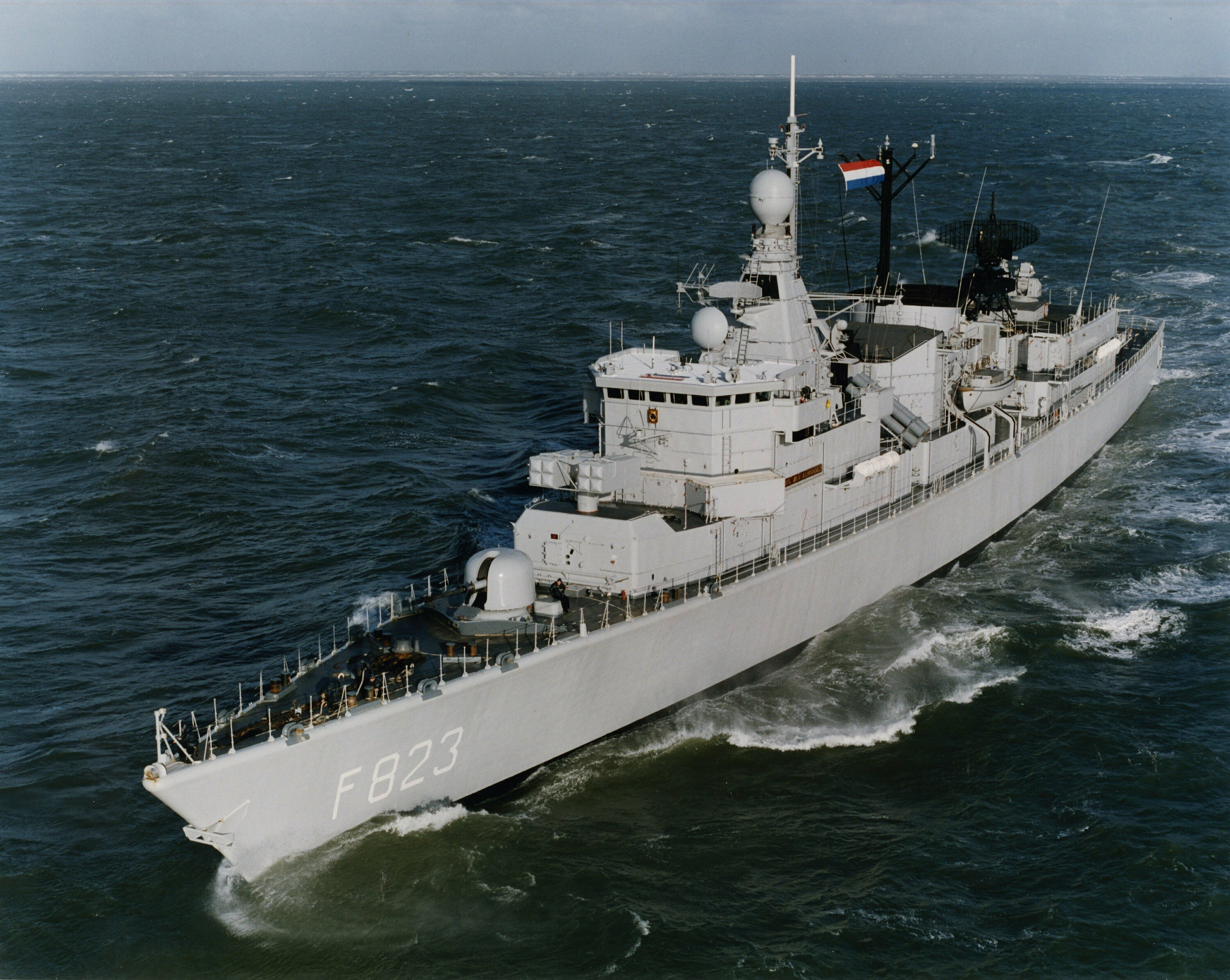
- Philips van Almonde in the Persian Gulf, November 1990

History

Netherlands
- Name: Philips van Almonde
- Namesake: Philips van Almonde
- Builder: Wilton-Fijenoord, Schiedam
- Laid down: 1 October 1977
- Launched: 11 August 1979
- Commissioned: 2 December 1981
- Decommissioned: 2002
- Fate: Sold to the Hellenic Navy

Greece
- Name: Themistoklis
- Acquired: 2003
- Identification: F465
- Status: active service

General characteristics
- Class & type: Kortenaer-class frigate
- Displacement: 3,500 long tons (3,600 t) standard; 3,800 long tons (3,900 t) full load
- Length: 130 m (426 ft 6 in)
- Beam: 14.4 m (47 ft 3 in)
- Draft: 4.4 m (14 ft 5 in)
- Propulsion: Combined gas or gas (COGOG) system: 2 × Rolls-Royce Tyne RM1C gas turbines, 4,900 shp (3,700 kW) each; 2 × Rolls-Royce Olympus TM3B gas turbines, 25,700 shp (19,200 kW) each (boost); 2 shafts
- Speed: 20 knots (37 km/h; 23 mph) cruise; 30 knots (56 km/h; 35 mph) maximum
- Endurance: 4,700 nautical miles at 16 knots (8,700 km at 30 km/h)
- Complement: 176–196
- Armament: 2 × OTO-Melara Compatto 76 mm/62 cal. gun; 2 × twin Mk46 torpedo tubes; 2 × quad RGM-84 Harpoon anti-ship missile launchers; 1 × 8-cell Sea Sparrow anti-aircraft missile launchers; 1 × Goalkeeper in Dutch service; 1 × Phalanx in Greek service
- Aircraft carried: 2 × Sea Lynx helicopters (1 in peacetime)

HNLMS Philips van Almonde (F823) (Dutch: Hr.Ms. Philips van Almonde) was a frigate of the Kortenaer class. The ship was in service with the Royal Netherlands Navy from 1981-2002. She was named after Dutch naval hero Philips van Almonde, and the ship's radio call sign was "PADF".

== Dutch service history ==
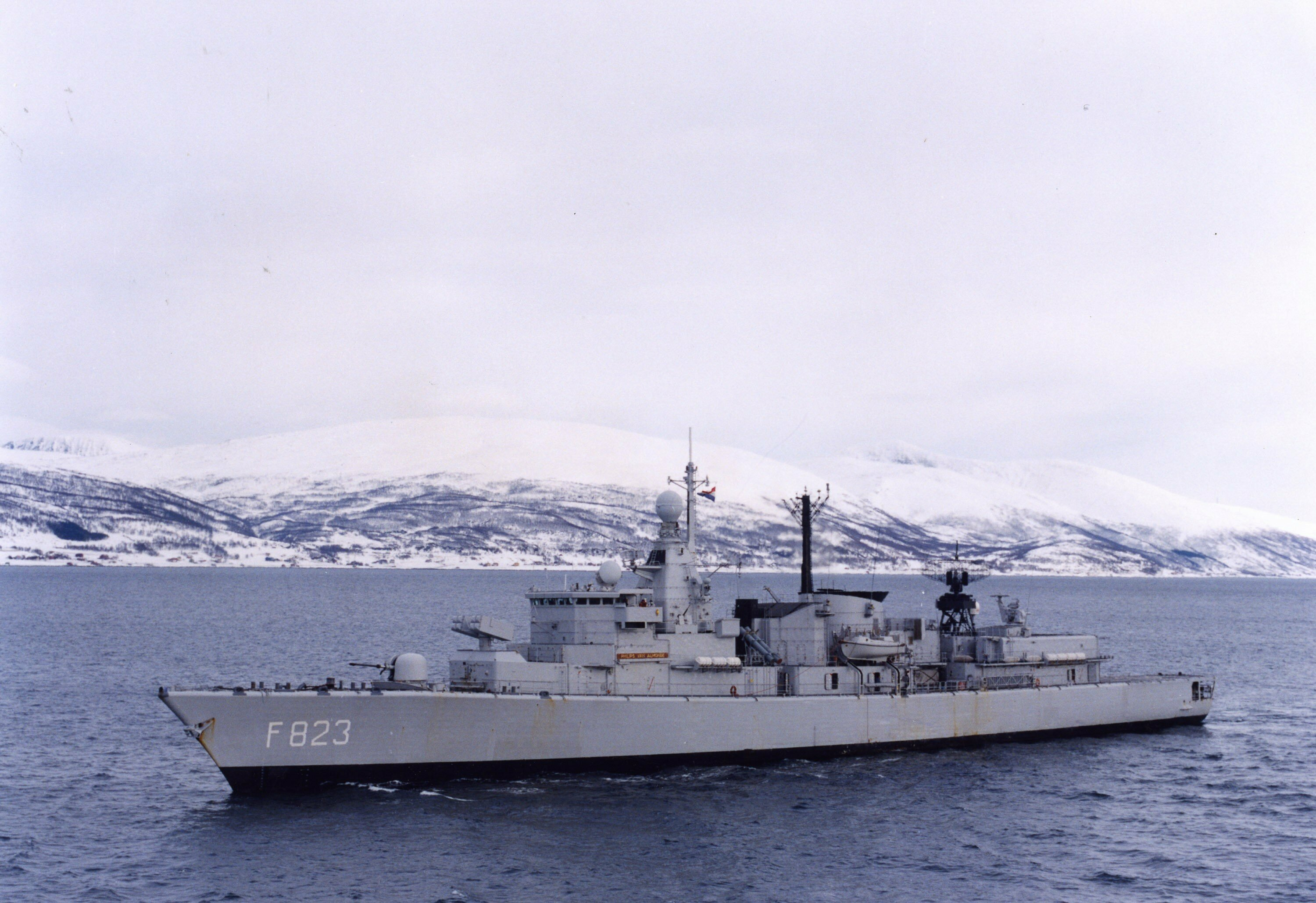

HNLMS Philips van Almonde was built at the Wilton-Fijenoord in Schiedam. The keel laying took place on 1 October 1977, and she was launched on 11 August 1979. The ship was put into service on 2 December 1981.

She, Jacob van Heemskerck, and the replenishment ship Zuiderkruis participated in the Gulf War and were sent to replace Witte de With & Pieter Florisz on 4 and 5 December 1990.

From 2 July to 15 December 1984, the ship participated in STANAVFORLANT.

In 2001, after the 11 September attacks, the ship took part in Operation Enduring Freedom.

In 2002, the vessel was decommissioned and sold to the Hellenic Navy.

== Greek service history ==
The ship was transferred in 2003 to the Hellenic Navy where she was renamed Themistoklis using the radio call sign "SZCG". It is in the Elli-class of frigates of the Hellenic Navy.
