= HNLMS Witte de With =

HNLMS Witte de With (Dutch: Hr.Ms. or Zr.Ms. Witte de With) may refer to following ships of the Royal Netherlands Navy:

- HNLMS Witte de With (1928), an Admiralen-class destroyer;
- HNLMS Witte de With (F813), a Jacob van Heemskerck-class frigate;
- Greek frigate Limnos, a Kortenaer-class frigate originally to be named Witte de With.
