= HNLMS Zuiderkruis (A832) =

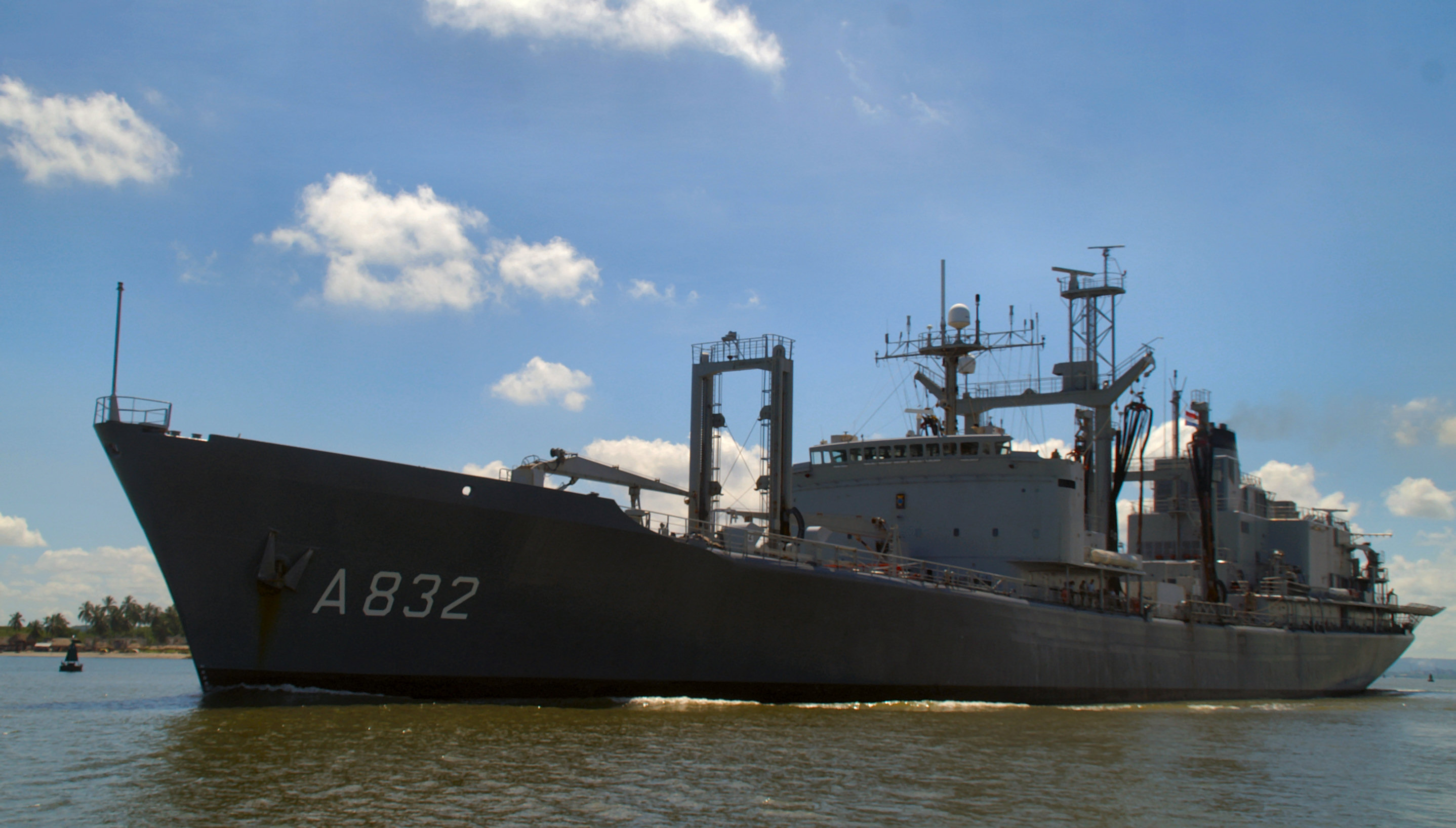
- Zuiderkruis (A832)

History

Netherlands
- Name: Zuiderkruis
- Namesake: Southern Cross (Crux)
- Owner: Royal Netherlands Navy
- Builder: Verolme Shipyards, Alblasserdam
- Laid down: 16 July 1973
- Launched: 15 October 1974
- Commissioned: 27 June 1975
- Decommissioned: 10 February 2012
- Out of service: 15 December 2011
- Identification: IMO number: 7382055; MMSI number: 245986000; Callsign: PAZI; Pennant number: A832
- Honours and awards: Operation Blue Nose, Operation Desert Shield, Operation Desert Storm, Operation Sharp Guard, UNMIL, Counter-drugs Operations in Caribbean.
- Fate: Scrapped in 2014

General characteristics
- Class & type: Replenishment oiler
- Displacement: 16,900 tons
- Length: 170 metres (560 ft)
- Beam: 20 metres (66 ft)
- Draught: 8.4 metres (28 ft)
- Speed: 21 knots (39 km/h; 24 mph)
- Complement: 170–190
- Armament: 1 x Goalkeeper CIWS system, up to 8 12.7 mm machine guns, up to 3 helicopters

HNLMS Zuiderkruis (A832) (Dutch: Hr.Ms. Zuiderkruis) was a replenishment oiler operated by the Royal Netherlands Navy. Zuiderkruis entered service in 1975 and was decommissioned on 10 February 2012. Her design was based on the earlier replenishment ship Poolster. The ship has been stripped for parts and left Den Helder for scrapping in Turkey on 21 February 2014. Zuiderkruis was replaced by HNLMS Karel Doorman.

== Service ==
On 15 October 1974 Zuiderkruis was launched at the yard of Verolme Shipyards in Alblasserdam and commissioned in the navy on 27 June 1975.

In 1981 Zuiderkruis was the first ship in the Dutch navy to have female sailors aboard.

8 February 1982 the ship together with the frigates Tromp, Callenburgh, Van Speijk, Piet Hein and the destroyer Overijssel departed from Den Helder for a trip to the US to show the flag and for 200 years diplomatic relations. The ships returned to Den Helder on 19 May 1982.

In 1988 Zuiderkruis and the frigates Jan van Brakel, Kortenaer and Witte de With made a trip to the far east and Australia to show the flag and for practice.

She, Philips van Almonde and Jacob van Heemskerck participated in the Gulf War and were sent to replace Witte de With and Pieter Florisz on 4 and 5 December 1990.

Zuiderkruis rescued 14 Sri Lankan refugees on 25 April 1996 Adriatic Sea and dropped them off at the Italian port of Bari.

On 17 February 2003 a combined Belgian-Dutch squadron left for practice on the Atlantic Ocean. The squadron consisted of Zuiderkruis and the frigates Jacob van Heemskerck, Van Speijk, Van Galen and Wandelaar. Several ports in the United Kingdom, Ireland, Canada and the United States were visited and the squadron was expected to return on 24 April.

She, Rotterdam and the school ship Urania visited Spithead for a fleet review held in honor of the 200th anniversary of the Battle of Trafalgar on 28 June 2005 .
