= HNLMS Kortenaer (F807) =

1976 Kortenaer-class frigate

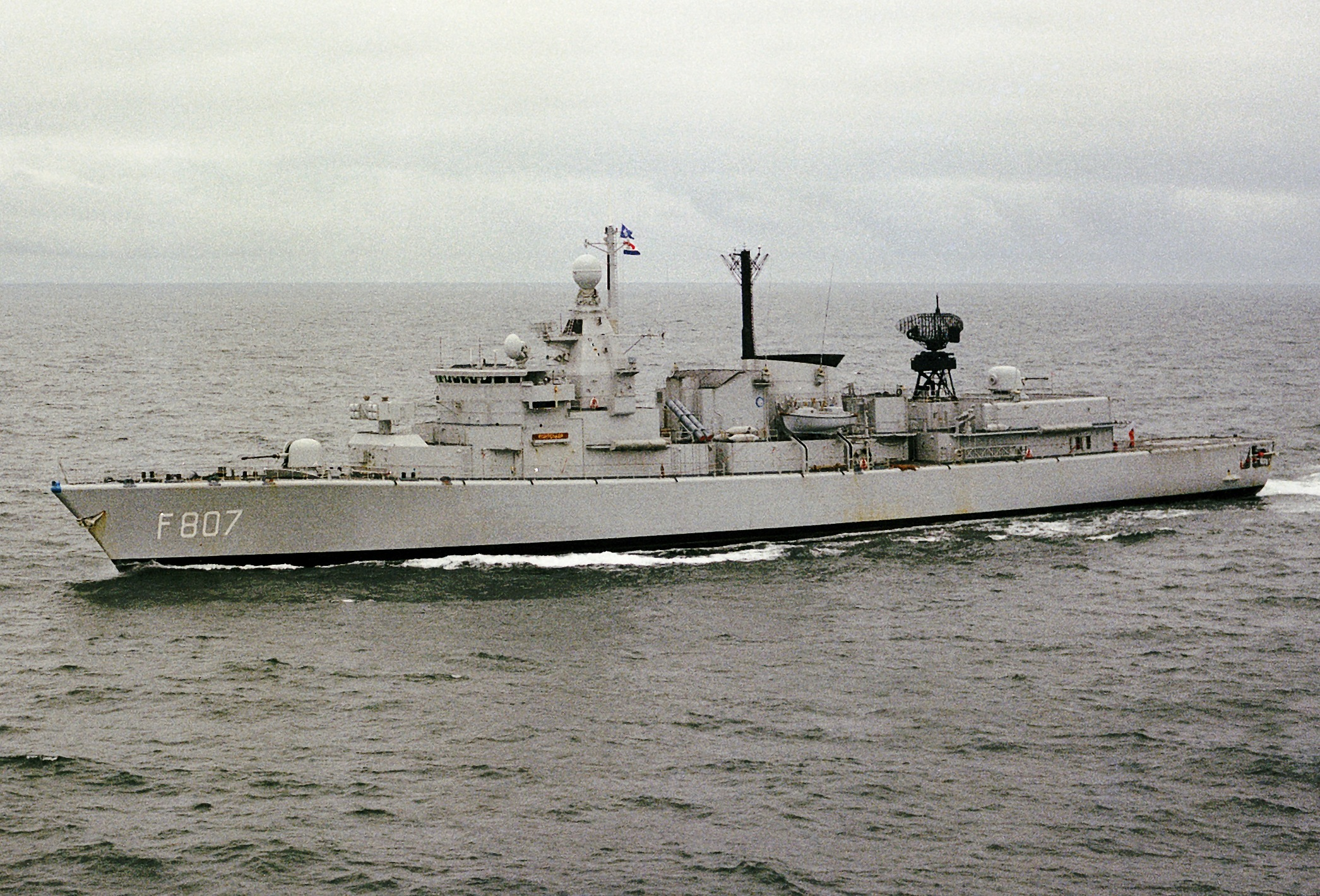
- Kortenaer at sea

History

Netherlands
- Name: Kortenaer
- Namesake: Egbert Bartholomeusz Kortenaer
- Ordered: 1974
- Builder: KM de Schelde, Vlissingen
- Laid down: 8 April 1975
- Launched: 18 December 1976
- Commissioned: 26 October 1978
- Decommissioned: 15 February 1996
- Fate: Sold to the Hellenic Navy, June 1997

Greece
- Name: Kountouriotis
- Namesake: Pavlos Kountouriotis
- Acquired: June 1997
- Commissioned: 15 December 1997
- Identification: F 462
- Status: Active service

General characteristics
- Class & type: Kortenaer-class frigate
- Displacement: 3,500 long tons (3,600 t) standard; 3,800 long tons (3,900 t) full load
- Length: 130 m (426 ft 6 in)
- Beam: 14.4 m (47 ft 3 in)
- Draft: 4.4 m (14 ft 5 in)
- Propulsion: Combined gas or gas (COGOG) system: 2 × Rolls-Royce Tyne RM1C gas turbines, 4,900 shp (3,700 kW) each; 2 × Rolls-Royce Olympus TM3B gas turbines, 25,700 shp (19,200 kW) each (boost); 2 shafts
- Speed: 20 knots (37 km/h; 23 mph) cruise; 30 knots (56 km/h; 35 mph) maximum
- Endurance: 4,700 nautical miles at 16 knots (8,700 km at 30 km/h)
- Complement: 176–196
- Armament: 2 × OTO-Melara Compatto 76 mm/62 cal. gun; 2 × twin Mk46 torpedo tubes; 2 × quad RGM-84 Harpoon anti-ship missile launchers; 1 × 8-cell Sea Sparrow anti-aircraft missile launchers; 1 × Goalkeeper in Dutch service; 1 × Phalanx in Greek service
- Aircraft carried: 2 × Sea Lynx helicopters (1 in peacetime)

HNLMS Kortenaer (F807) (Dutch: Hr.Ms. Kortenaer) was a frigate of the Kortenaer class. The ship was in service with the Royal Netherlands Navy from 1978 to 1997 and today serves as HS Kountouriotis with the Hellenic Navy. The frigate was initially named after Dutch naval hero Egbert Bartholomeusz Kortenaer and then after Pavlos Kountouriotis, distinguished Admiral of the Hellenic Navy, responsible for Greek naval victories in the Aegean Sea that secured the Aegean for Greece during the First Balkan War. The ship's radio call sign was "PADA".

== Design and construction ==
In the early 1970s, the Royal Netherlands Navy developed a 'Standard' frigate design to replace the destroyers of the Holland and Friesland classes. The 'Standard' design would have anti-submarine (the Kortenaer class) and anti-aircraft (the Jacob van Heemskerck-class) variants with different armaments on a common hull design. The first eight Kortenaers were ordered in 1974, with four more ordered in 1976, although two were sold to Greece while being built, and replaced by two of the anti-aircraft variant.

Kortenaer was 130.2 metres (427 ft 2 in) long overall and 121.8 metres (400 ft) between perpendiculars, with a beam) of 14.4 metres (47 ft 3 in) and a draft of 4.4 metres (14 ft 5 in). Displacement was 3,000 long tons (3,050 t) standard and 3,785 long tons (3,846 t) full load. The ship was powered by two 25,800 shaft horsepower (19,200 kW) Rolls-Royce Olympus TM 3B and two 4,900 shaft horsepower (3,700 kW) Rolls-Royce Tyne TM 1C gas turbines in a combined gas or gas (COGOG) arrangement, driving two propeller shafts. The Olympus engines gave a speed of 30 knots (35 mph; 56 km/h), and the Tyne cruise engines gave a speed of 20 knots (23 mph; 37 km/h).

Kortenaer's main anti-aircraft armament was an 8-round NATO Sea Sparrow surface-to-air missile launcher in front of the bridge. An OTO Melara 76 mm was fitted forward of the Sea Sparrow launcher, while a Goalkeeper CIWS was planned to be fitted aft, on the roof of the ship's hangar. Goalkeeper was not available when the ships were built, however, and Kortenaer was completed with a second Oto Melara 76 mm gun in its place. Eight Harpoon anti-ship missiles could be carried in two quadruple launchers, although two or four Harpoons was a more normal peacetime load-out. A hangar and fight deck were fitted to accommodate two Westland Lynx helicopters, although only one was normally carried. Close-in anti submarine armament was provided by four 324 mm tubes for US Mark 46 torpedoes. A Signaal LW-08 long-range air search radar was fitted, together with a ZW-06 surface-search radar, with WM-25 and STIR-180 fire control radars to direct the ship's armament. A Canadian SQS-505 hull-mounted sonar was fitted.

Kortenaer's aft Oto Melara 76 mm gun was replaced by a Bofors 40 mm anti-aircraft gun in 1982, and this, in turn, was replaced by the intended Goalkeeper by 1995. On transfer to Greece, the Goalkeeper was removed. Greece replaced it by an American Phalanx CIWS, while Agusta-Bell AB 212 helicopters replaced the Lynxes.

HNLMS Kortenaer, the name-ship of her class, was laid down at the Koninklijke Maatschappij De Schelde (KM de Schelde) shipyard in Vlissingen on 8 April 1975. She was launched on 18 December 1976 and commissioned into service on 26 October 1978.

== Dutch service history ==
On 12 March 1979, she and the frigate Tromp, the destroyer Drenthe, and the replenishment ship Poolster departed for a trip to the Far East to show the flag.

In 1988, Kortenaer and the frigates Jan van Brakel & Witte de With and the replenishment ship Zuiderkruis made a trip to the Far East and Australia to show the flag and for practice.

In June 1994, the ship participated in the BALTOPS 94 naval exercise with vessels from several other navies.

On 15 February 1996, Kortenaer was decommissioned, and, in June 1997, she was sold to the Hellenic Navy.

== Greek service history ==
The ship was put into service on 15 December 1997 as Kountouriotis (Κουντουριώτης) with the pennant number F 462, using the radio call sign was "SZCT". In September 2017, the ship was assigned to NATO SNMG2.
