= HDMS Flyvefisken =

HDMS Flyvefisken is the name of the following ships of the Royal Danish Navy:

- HDMS Flyvefisken (P500), lead Flyvefisken-class torpedo boat, heavily damaged in a collision in 1957
- HDMS Flyvefisken (P550), lead Flyvefisken-class patrol boat, in service 1989–2008 then sold to Lithuania
