= List of shipwrecks in 1957 =

The list of shipwrecks in 1957 includes ships sunk, foundered, grounded, or otherwise lost during 1957.

table of contents
1957
Jan	Feb	Mar	Apr
May	Jun	Jul	Aug
Sep	Oct	Nov	Dec
Unknown date

== January ==
=== 6 January ===
List of shipwrecks: 6 January 1957
Ship	State	Description
Vaila	United Kingdom	The fisheries protection vessel ran aground off the Isle of Lewis, Outer Hebrides and sank with the loss of five of her twenty crew.

=== 13 January ===
List of shipwrecks: 13 January 1957
Ship	State	Description
Sound Fisher	United Kingdom	The cargo ship sank in the North Sea after her cargo shifted. All fourteen crew were rescued.

=== 14 January ===
List of shipwrecks: 14 January 1957
Ship	State	Description
Saint John Pilot Boat No. 1	Canada	The pilot boat was struck by the inbound freighter Fort Avalon, off Mispec near the Saint John, New Brunswick harbour mouth, and sank. Three Harbour pilots and four crew lost their lives.

=== 15 January ===
List of shipwrecks: 15 January 1957
Ship	State	Description
Janina	Norway	The tanker caught fire in the Atlantic Ocean west of Lisbon, Portugal (41°33′N 9°33′W). The ship was abandoned, she sank on 18 January. She was on a voyage from Odesa, Soviet Union to Turku, Finland.

=== 17 January ===
List of shipwrecks: 17 January 1957
Ship	State	Description
Holdernith	United Kingdom	The coaster ran aground in the Humber Estuary and sank. She was on a voyage from Goole, Yorkshire to London. She was refloated two days later, returned to service.

=== 21 January ===
List of shipwrecks: 21 January 1957
Ship	State	Description
Orkla	Norway	The cargo ship ran aground at Buhlomrasa Light and broke in two. Total loss.
Scania	Sweden	The cargo ship was in collision with Chili (France) and sank at Vlissingen, Netherlands. All crew were rescued.
Valvadere	United States	The 10-gross register ton 40.2-foot (12.3 m) gasoline-powered wooden fishing vessel foundered at Kodiak, Territory of Alaska.

=== 24 January ===
List of shipwrecks: 24 January 1957
Ship	State	Description
Minocher Cowasjee	Pakistan	The cargo ship reported in distress in position 25.3°S 68.00°E, east of Madagascar in the Indian Ocean, coming from Tianjin heading to Antwerp. All 51 crew members, mostly Pakistanis and at least one German, were killed.

=== 25 January ===
List of shipwrecks: 25 January 1957
Ship	State	Description
HDMS Ternen	Royal Danish Navy	The cutter was reported missing off the coast of Greenland. Discovered on 3 February sunk at Ravns Storø with the loss of all eight crew.

=== 27 January ===
List of shipwrecks: 27 January 1957
Ship	State	Description
Defender	United Kingdom	The cargo liner ran aground in the Crosby Channel, River Mersey whilst trying to avoid a collision with the Mersey Docks and Harbour Board dredger Leviathan. Refloated but then ran aground again. Refloated a second time and returned to port.
Henrica	Netherlands	The cargo ship ran aground off Maryport, Cumberland, United Kingdom. She was later refloated.

=== 29 January ===
List of shipwrecks: 29 January 1957
Ship	State	Description
Jeanny	United States	The T2 tanker caught fire and exploded at Alameda, California. Although severely damaged, she was repaired and returned to service as Trojan.

=== Unknown date ===
List of shipwrecks: Unknown January 1957
Ship	State	Description
USS YWM-148	United States Navy	The water barge, a former YOG-40-class fuel oil barge, was wrecked at the entrance to the channel at Midway Island sometime in January. When efforts to refloat her failed she was scuttled with demolition charges, partially submerged.

== February ==
=== 3 February ===
List of shipwrecks: 3 February 1957
Ship	State	Description
Roxanna Dawn	United States	The 24-gross register ton, 40.7-foot (12.4 m) fishing vessel was destroyed by fire in Back Bay (58°04′40″N 152°45′50″W) off Afognak Island in the Kodiak Archipelago off the Territory of Alaska.

=== 4 February ===
List of shipwrecks: 4 February 1957
Ship	State	Description
Izmir	Turkey	The passenger ship collided with Howell Lykes (United States) in the Gulf of Smyrna and sank with the loss of one passenger and two crew.

=== 5 February ===
List of shipwrecks: 5 February 1957
Ship	State	Description
Robert Limbrick	United Kingdom	The fishing vessel ran aground on Quinish Point, Mull with the loss of all 12 crew.

=== 8 February ===
List of shipwrecks: 8 February 1957
Ship	State	Description
Stralsund	West Germany	The cargo ship sank off Flamborough Head, Yorkshire, United Kingdom. All 27 crew rescued.

=== 10 February ===
List of shipwrecks: 10 February 1957
Ship	State	Description
Chelsea	United States	Carrying a cargo of fuel oil, the 170-foot (52 m), 556-gross register ton coastal tanker grounded on the Sandy Bay Breakwater off Rockport, Massachusetts, and sank in up to 60 feet (18 m) of water 0.5 nautical miles (0.9 km; 0.6 mi) northeast of Thacher Island at 42°38′52″N 070°34′11″W. She broke in half after sinking.

=== 12 February ===
List of shipwrecks: 12 February 1957
Ship	State	Description
Breezand	Netherlands	Breezand The coaster was driven ashore.

=== 20 February ===
List of shipwrecks: 20 February 1957
Ship	State	Description
Vittangi	Sweden	Newsreel of Vittangi stranded at Vlissingen (in Dutch) The ore carrier ran aground off Vlissingen, the Netherlands, and was wrecked. Refloated on 24 February and beached to enable salvage of her cargo of iron ore.

=== 22 February ===
List of shipwrecks: 22 February 1957
Ship	State	Description
Christian Russ	West Germany	The coaster was in collision with Baltavia (United Kingdom) and sank off the east coast of Denmark. All fifteen crew rescued.
Clydesdale	United States	The 38-gross register ton, 55.6-foot (16.9 m) fishing vessel was lost in a storm at Slocum Arm (57°34′N 136°03′W) on the west coast of Chichagof Island the Alexander Archipelago in Southeast Alaska.

=== 26 February ===
List of shipwrecks: 26 February 1957
Ship	State	Description
Hydralock	United Kingdom	The cargo ship ran aground off Ockseu Island (Wuqiu), Republic of China (Taiwan). All 31 crew abandoned ship, but then disappeared. They were later discovered safe on Haitan Island.

=== 27 February ===
List of shipwrecks: 27 February 1957
Ship	State	Description
Île de France	France	The ocean liner ran aground off Martinique. Refloated after several hours. The ship suffered a broken rudder and damaged propellers. She was towed to Newport News, Virginia, United States for repairs.

=== Unknown date ===
List of shipwrecks: unknown date in February 1957
Ship	State	Description
Reading	United States	The Liberty ship ran aground in Buzzards Bay, Massachusetts and was severely damaged.

== March ==
=== 1 March ===
List of shipwrecks: 1 March 1957
Ship	State	Description
Cheerio	United States	The 18-gross register ton, 37.2-foot (11.3 m) fishing vessel was destroyed by fire in Gnat Cove (55°23′00″N 131°19′40″W) in Carroll Inlet (55.4728°N 131.3114°W) in Southeast Alaska.

=== 6 March ===
List of shipwrecks: 6 March 1957
Ship	State	Description
Balto	United States	The 14-gross register ton, 36.9-foot (11.2 m) fishing vessel sank in Valdez Arm (60°53′N 146°54′W) on the south-central coast of the Territory of Alaska.

=== 7 March ===
List of shipwrecks: 7 March 1957
Ship	State	Description
Andradite	United Kingdom	The 131-foot (40 m), 313-ton trawler was wrecked 5 miles (8.0 km) north of Curachan Rock, Barra Head, Castlebay, Barra Island, Outer Hebrides, a total loss.
USNS Mission San Francisco	United States Navy	The Type T2-SE-A3 tanker was in collision with Elna II (Liberia) in the Delaware River at Pennsville, New Jersey. She was cut in two with the stern section being set on fire. Nine of her 44 crew were killed.

=== 8 March ===
List of shipwrecks: 8 March 1957
Ship	State	Description
Thorpe Grange	United Kingdom	The cargo ship ran aground off Vlissingen, the Netherlands. She later was refloated.

=== 9 March ===
List of shipwrecks: 9 March 1957
Ship	State	Description
Katherine T	United States	The 13-gross register ton, 34.7-foot (10.6 m) fishing vessel sank at Anchor Pass (55°59′N 131°24′W) near Bell Island in the Alexander Archipelago in Southeast Alaska.

=== 14 March ===
List of shipwrecks: 14 March 1957
Ship	State	Description
Waterman	Netherlands	The Victory ship collided with the Liberty ship Merit (Italy in the Atlantic Ocean and was holed. Waterman was on a voyage from Rotterdam, South Holland to Halifax, Nova Scotia, Canada. Waterman put back to Rotterdam.

=== 19 March ===
List of shipwrecks: 19 March 1957
Ship	State	Description
Heimdal	Sweden	The cargo ship was wrecked on Stangskar Point, Landsort.

=== 22 March ===
List of shipwrecks: 22 March 1957
Ship	State	Description
Harriet	Turkey	The cargo ship struck ice and sank at Hanko, Finland. All crew rescued.

== April ==
=== 4 April ===
List of shipwrecks: 4 April 1957
Ship	State	Description
Lisbeth M	United Kingdom	The coaster collided with the collier Sir John Snell and sank off Margate, Kent with the loss of five of her fourteen crew.

=== 9 April ===
List of shipwrecks: 9 April 1957
Ship	State	Description
Firman	Norway	The former Castle-class trawler foundered at Kibergnese, or off Kiberg.

=== 12 April ===
List of shipwrecks: 12 April 1957
Ship	State	Description
General Aupick	France	The fishing trawler sprang a leak and sank in the Dogger Bank.
Kitagawa Maru No 5.	Japan	According to Japanese Coast Guard official announced, a wooden passenger boat, from Ikuchi Island to Onomichi, Hiroshima Prefecture, Seto Islands Sea, this boat 239 persons were on board, which were more than three times capacity, however, not stormy weather at this accident, 126 persons were rescued, 113 persons were lost to lives.

=== 14 April ===
List of shipwrecks: 14 April 1957
Ship	State	Description
Lindesnaes	Sweden	The tanker, carrying 1,732 cubic metres (458,000 US gal) of kerosene on its way from Nynäshamn to Norrköping, sank off Oxelösund in a snowstorm.

=== 16 April ===
List of shipwrecks: 16 April 1957
Ship	State	Description
Gunnard	Netherlands	The tug sank following a boiler explosion at Rotterdam. Three people were killed and fifteen injured by flying débris.

=== 21 April ===
List of shipwrecks: 21 April 1957
Ship	State	Description
Collingwood	United Kingdom	The tug collided with Bittern (United Kingdom) and sank in the River Mersey at Liverpool, Lancashire. All six crew rescued.

=== 25 April ===
List of shipwrecks: 25 April 1957
Ship	State	Description
John Pratt	Canada	The tug capsized and sank at Montreal, Quebec with the loss of four crew.

== May ==
=== 20 May ===
List of shipwrecks: 20 May 1957
Ship	State	Description
Birgitte Toft	Denmark	The cargo ship caught fire off Rangoon, Burma and was severely damaged. Subsequently repaired and returned to service.

== June ==
=== 5 June ===
List of shipwrecks: 5 June 1957
Ship	State	Description
Pluto	Australia	The dredger was wrecked off Newcastle, New South Wales.

=== 12 June ===
List of shipwrecks: 12 June 1957
Ship	State	Description
Maria	Costa Rica	Capsized and sank with the loss of 13 lives after an onboard explosion of her cargo, 10 nautical miles (19 km) north of Huasco, Chile.

=== 14 June ===
List of shipwrecks: 14 June 1957
Ship	State	Description
HMS Sidon	Royal Navy	The decommissioned S-class submarine was sunk for use as an ASDIC target.

=== 19 June ===
List of shipwrecks: 19 June 1957
Ship	State	Description
Ioannis	Greece	Collided with Stony Point (United States) 15 nautical miles (28 km) off Ouessant, Finistère, France. Both ships caught fire with the loss of eleven lives and 40 injured, twenty seriously.
Stony Point	United States	The T2 tanker collided with Ioannis (Greece) 15 nautical miles (28 km) off Ouessant and caught fire. Declared a constructive total loss, she was consequently scrapped.

=== 20 June ===
List of shipwrecks: 20 June 1957
Ship	State	Description
D S S Co. No. 1	United States	The 84-gross register ton, 110.2-foot (33.6 m) barge sank off Ocean Cape (59°32′30″N 139°51′30″W) on the south-central coast of Alaska.
Yakima III	United States	The 41-gross register ton, 60-foot (18 m) scow sank at Hoonah, Territory of Alaska.

=== 28 June ===
List of shipwrecks: 28 June 1957
Ship	State	Description
HMS Cleveland	Royal Navy	The Hunt-class destroyer ran aground at Llangennith, Glamorgan whilst under tow to Llanelly for scrapping.

== July ==
=== 8 July ===
List of shipwrecks: 8 July 1957
Ship	State	Description
Reina del Pacifico	United Kingdom	The ocean liner ran aground 5.5 nautical miles (10.2 km) north of Ireland Island, Bermuda. Refloated on 11 July.

=== 10 July ===
List of shipwrecks: 10 July 1957
Ship	State	Description
Nefco 17	United States	The 128-gross register ton, 75.9-foot (23.1 m) barge was destroyed by fire at Ketchikan, Alaska.

=== 15 July ===
List of shipwrecks: 15 July 1957
Ship	State	Description
Clarisse	Panama	The cargo ship sank in heavy seas in the Indian Ocean at 08°04′N 051°10′E.

=== 16 July ===
List of shipwrecks: 16 July 1957
Ship	State	Description
Aleutian	United States	The 57-gross register ton, 62.6-foot (19.1 m) fishing vessel was wrecked on Chiniak Rock – presumably a feature of or reference to Chiniak Island (57°37′35″N 52°09′00″W) near Cape Chiniak (57°37′N 152°10′W) – off the coast of Kodiak Island near Kodiak, Territory of Alaska, during a storm.
Tweed Breeze	United Kingdom	Typhoon Wendy: The cargo ship was blown ashore on Stonecutters Island, Hong Kong. Refloated on 25 July.

=== 19 July ===
List of shipwrecks: 19 July 1957
Ship	State	Description
Charisse	Panama	The cargo ship sank off Aden in a storm.

=== 23 July ===
List of shipwrecks: 23 July 1957
Ship	State	Description
Amicus	United Kingdom	The cargo ship ran aground at Las Palmas, Canary Islands, Spain.

=== Unknown date ===
List of shipwrecks: Unknown July 1957
Ship	State	Description
USS YON-146	United States Navy	The 375-foot (114 m), 5,410-ton, YOG-40-class oil barge sank in an accident in Subic Bay, Luzon, the Philippines, sometime in July.

== August ==
=== 1 August ===
List of shipwrecks: 1 August 1957
Ship	State	Description
HNLMS Jan van Brakel	Royal Netherlands Navy	The frigate/survey vessel was stricken from the Navy List and expended as a target at Biak, Netherlands New Guinea.

=== 3 August ===
List of shipwrecks: 3 August 1957
Ship	State	Description
Sea Otter	United States	The 17-gross register ton, 40.2-foot (12.3 m) fishing vessel sank in Montague Strait (60°00′N 147°45′W) in Prince William Sound on the south-central coast of the Territory of Alaska.

=== 7 August ===
List of shipwrecks: 7 August 1957
Ship	State	Description
Chignik 6	United States	The 8-gross register ton, 31.2-foot (9.5 m) fishing vessel was destroyed by fire at Chignik Lagoon, Territory of Alaska.

=== 11 August ===
List of shipwrecks: 11 August 1957
Ship	State	Description
George H	United States	The 11-gross register ton, 34.2-foot (10.4 m) fishing vessel was destroyed by fire in Wide Bay (57°22′N 156°11′W) on the south coast of the Alaska Peninsula in the Territory of Alaska.
Redoubt	United States	The 13-gross register ton, 39.8-foot (12.1 m) fishing vessel was destroyed by fire at Chatham (57°30′50″N 134°55′30″W), Territory of Alaska.

=== 16 August ===
List of shipwrecks: 16 August 1957
Ship	State	Description
Glacier	United States	The 17-gross register ton, 38.9-foot (11.9 m) fishing vessel was destroyed by fire at Ketchikan, Territory of Alaska.

=== 21 August ===
List of shipwrecks: 21 August 1957
Ship	State	Description
World Splendour	Liberia	The tanker exploded 35 nautical miles (65 km) east of Gibraltar and sank. All crew rescued by the tug Confident (United Kingdom).

=== 22 August ===
List of shipwrecks: 22 August 1957
Ship	State	Description
M-351	Soviet Navy	The submarine sank off Balaklava. She was refloated on 26 August. Her crew survived.

=== 26 August ===
List of shipwrecks: 26 August 1957
Ship	State	Description
USS Tarpon	United States Navy	The decommissioned Porpoise-class submarine foundered in the Atlantic Ocean off Cape Hatteras, North Carolina, while under tow to the scrapyard.

=== 28 August ===
List of shipwrecks: 28 August 1957
Ship	State	Description
Cuidad de Buenos Aires	Argentina	The ferry collided with Mormacsurf (United States in the Paraná River and sank. Of the 231 passengers and crew on board, 94 were reported missing.

=== Unknown date ===
List of shipwrecks: Unknown date 1957
Ship	State	Description
Hassel	Norway	Collided with a French ship in the Strait of Dover.
Northern Ranger	Canada	The coaster ran aground in Bonavista Bay, Newfoundland. Refloated on 26 August having been aground for "nearly a week".

== September ==
=== 1 September ===
List of shipwrecks: 1 September 1957
Ship	State	Description
Flint	United States	The 35-gross register ton, 51.9-foot (15.8 m) fishing vessel was wrecked in the Territory of Alaska on the coast of Kodiak Island outside Womens Bay (57°43′N 152°31′W) Channel.

=== 4 September ===
List of shipwrecks: 4 September 1957
Ship	State	Description
HMS Decoy	Royal Navy	The Daring-class destroyer ran aground at Portland Harbour, Dorset, England, due to failure of her steering gear.
HDMS Flyvefisken, and HDMS Høgen	Royal Danish Navy	The torpedo boat HDMS Høgen collided with the Flyvefisken-class torpedo boat HDMS Flyvefisken and sank in the Great Belt. HDMS Flyvefisken was severely damaged.

=== 8 September ===
List of shipwrecks: 8 September 1957
Ship	State	Description
Saranac	United States	The floating power barge, a converted T2 tanker, was driven ashore at the mouth of the Okitsu River, Japan in a typhoon. She was refloated on 24 September and taken in to Kure, where she was found to be severely damaged. Laid up, she was subsequently returned to service as a power barge at Kure.

=== 10 September ===
List of shipwrecks: 10 September 1957
Ship	State	Description
Blake	United Kingdom	The Tiger-class cruiser was severely damaged by an onboard explosion at Govan, Renfrewshire whilst fitting-out. Twenty people were injured.

=== 15 September ===
List of shipwrecks: 15 September 1957
Ship	State	Description
Aida	Egypt	The transport ran aground on Big Brothers Island in the Red Sea and sank. A tug rescued 77 passengers and crew and others also made it to shore.

=== 17 September ===
List of shipwrecks: 17 September 1957
Ship	State	Description
Akwe	United States	The 15-gross register ton, 36.2-foot (11.0 m) fishing vessel was lost after she collided with an iceberg in Stephens Passage in Southeast Alaska 60 nautical miles (110 km; 69 mi) south of Juneau, Territory of Alaska, 3 nautical miles (5.6 km; 3.5 mi) south of Midway Island (57.9972222°N 135.6097222°W), and 3 nautical miles (5.6 km; 3.5 mi) west of Coke Point.

=== 21 September ===
List of shipwrecks: 21 September 1957
Ship	State	Description
Pamir	West Germany	Hurricane Carrie: The barque capsized and sank in the Atlantic Ocean 600 nautical miles (1,100 km; 690 mi) west-southwest of the Azores at 35°57′N 40°20′W with the loss of 80 lives. There were six survivors.
S-81	Soviet Navy	The Type VIIC submarine was severely damaged in the Barents Sea off Novaja Semla during an atomic bomb test. Consequently stricken on 16 October and subsequently scrapped.

=== 24 September ===
List of shipwrecks: 24 September 1957
Ship	State	Description
Belleville	Norway	The 4,946-gross register ton cargo ship ran aground in fog just west of Seal Rock at the entrance to the harbor at Newport, Rhode Island, and sank in up to 30 feet (9.1 m) of water at 41°26′38″N 071°20′51″W.
Margaret J	United States	The 28-gross register ton, 49-foot (14.9 m) fishing vessel was wrecked at Sunny Cove (55°15′N 132°15′W) in Chomley Sound (55°17′N 132°04′W) in Southeast Alaska.

=== 25 September ===
List of shipwrecks: 25 September 1957
Ship	State	Description
Hildebrand	United Kingdom	The cargo liner ran aground off Cascais, Portugal.

=== 26 September ===
List of shipwrecks: 26 September 1957
Ship	State	Description
Lady Adriana	United Kingdom	The passenger ship ran aground in the Rhine at Oberwesel, West Germany.
M-256	Soviet Navy	The Quebec-class submarine sank in the Gulf of Finland after a fire, with 28 crew members killed and seven saved.

=== 27 September ===
List of shipwrecks: 27 September 1957
Ship	State	Description
Frontier	South Africa	Frontier During a voyage from Durban to Port Elizabeth, the cargo ship ran aground on the coast of South Africa at the mouth of the Ncera River, 23 nautical miles (43 km; 26 mi) east of East London. She broke up on 29 September and was declared a total loss.

=== Unknown date ===
List of shipwrecks: Unknown date 1957
Ship	State	Description
Nazarene	United Kingdom	The fishing vessel ran aground on Pedn-e-Vurnow beach, Porthcurnow. All crew safe, vessel destroyed.

== October ==
=== 3 October ===
List of shipwrecks: 3 October 1957
Ship	State	Description
Hogh Swörd	Norway	The tanker ran aground at Hoedenskerke, Zeeland, Netherlands. Later refloated with the aid of eleven tugs.

=== 7 October ===
List of shipwrecks: 7 October 1957
Ship	State	Description
Nanki Maru No.8	Japan	The tanker collided with Hai Ming (Taiwan) off Kobe and sank.

=== 8 October ===
List of shipwrecks: 8 October 1957
Ship	State	Description
USNS Mission San Miguel	United States Navy	The T2 tanker ran aground on the Laysan Reef, 775 nautical miles (1,435 km) north west of the Hawaii Islands. Her crew were rescued. She was on a voyage from Guam, Mariana Islands to Seattle, Washington She was abandoned as a constructive total loss and was subsequently used as a target ship.

=== 10 October ===
List of shipwrecks: 10 October 1957
Ship	State	Description
S-84	Soviet Navy	The Type VIIc/41 submarine was sunk in the Barents Sea off Novaja Zemlja during the test of an atomic bomb.

=== 16 October ===
List of shipwrecks: 16 October 1957
Ship	State	Description
Captain George	Panama	The Liberty ship ran aground in the Cape Verde Islands. She was declared a constructive total loss and scrapped.
Flandres, and Trader	Belgium; Liberia	The Victory ship Flandres collided with the Park ship Trader in the English Channel 4 nautical miles (7.4 km) south of the East Goodwin Lightship ( Trinity House) with the loss of a crew member. Flandres was towed in to Calais, France.
Sea Prince	United Kingdom	The TID-class tug was run into by Cato (United Kingdom), which she was towing. Sea Prince capsized and sank off Avonmouth, Somerset.

=== 17 October ===
List of shipwrecks: 17 October 1937
Ship	State	Description
Ciscar	Spanish Navy	The Churruca-class destroyer was wrecked in fog on rocks at Ferrol, Spain.

=== 19 October ===
List of shipwrecks: 19 October 1957
Ship	State	Description
Swinomish	United States	The 18-gross register ton, 40.9-foot (12.5 m) fishing vessel sank in Pavlof Bay on the south coast of the Alaska Peninsula in the Territory of Alaska.

=== 21 October ===
List of shipwrecks: 21 October 1957
Ship	State	Description
Phoenix X	United States	The 70-gross register ton, 79.6-foot (24.3 m) fishing vessel was destroyed by fire off Sukkwan Island in the Alexander Archipelago in Southeast Alaska.

=== 22 October ===
List of shipwrecks: 22 October 1957
Ship	State	Description
Plan V	West Germany	The coaster collided in the Scheldt with Winnetou (West Germany) and sank. All crew were rescued.
Shillong	United Kingdom	The cargo ship collided in the Gulf of Suez with Purfina Congo (Belgium) and sank with the loss of three lives. Thirteen racehorses were drowned.

=== Unknown date ===
List of shipwrecks: Unknown date 1957
Ship	State	Description
Eifuku Maru	Japan	The cargo ship ran aground on the Great Barrier Reef, 300 nautical miles (560 km) east of Rockhampton, Queensland, Australia. Abandoned on 15 October as a total loss. All 47 crew rescued by the tug Fearless (Australia).

== November ==
=== 4 November ===
List of shipwrecks: 4 November 1957
Ship	State	Description
Cordova Salvor	United States	The 180-gross register ton, 99.9-foot (30.4 m) motor cargo vessel was wrecked at Cape Sarichef (54°35′50″N 164°55′30″W) on the western coast of Unimak Island in the Aleutian Islands.
Iano	Italy	The cargo ship was driven aground in a gale at Sandown Bay, Isle of Wight.
Marano	South Africa	The 124.8-foot (38.0 m), decommissioned trawler was shelled and sunk as a target by warships in False Bay, South Africa.

=== 5 November ===
List of shipwrecks: 5 November 1957
Ship	State	Description
Corale	Netherlands	Rammed by Nikolai Bauman (Soviet Union) and sunk off Vlissingen. All eleven crew rescued.

=== 6 November ===
List of shipwrecks: 6 November 1957
Ship	State	Description
Korso	Finland	The coaster sank 35 nautical miles (65 km) west of Aveiro, Portugal with the loss of three of her eleven crew.

=== 11 November ===
List of shipwrecks: 11 November 1957
Ship	State	Description
Deutschland	West Germany	The train ferry ran aground at Grossenbrode, West Germany. Refloated later that day.

=== 26 November ===
List of shipwrecks: 26 November 1957
Ship	State	Description
Lena F	United States	The 6-gross register ton, 29.1-foot (8.9 m) fishing vessel was destroyed by fire at Wrangell, Territory of Alaska.

=== Unknown date ===
List of shipwrecks: Unknown date 1957
Ship	State	Description
Mercurius H	Netherlands	Ran aground at Dungeness, Kent.

== December ==
=== 1 December ===
List of shipwrecks: 1 December 1957
Ship	State	Description
Nikitas K	Panama	The cargo ship foundered in the Black Sea with the loss of six of her fourteen crew.

=== 2 December ===
List of shipwrecks: 2 December 1957
Ship	State	Description
Pioneer No. 4	United States	The 30-gross register ton, 54-foot (16.5 m) cargo scow was wrecked in Windy Bay (59°13′30″N 151°27′30″W) in Cook Inlet on the south-central coast of the Territory of Alaska.

=== 3 December ===
List of shipwrecks: 3 December 1957
Ship	State	Description
Dot	United States	The 15-gross register ton, 37.9-foot (11.6 m) fishing vessel destroyed by fire at Craig, Territory of Alaska.

=== 8 December ===
List of shipwrecks: 8 December 1957
Ship	State	Description
Patria	Netherlands	The coaster was driven ashore in a gale at Sheephaven Bay, Northern Ireland.

=== 9 December ===
List of shipwrecks: 9 December 1957
Ship	State	Description
Saba	Netherlands	The coaster was driven ashore in a gale at Mulroy Bay, Northern Ireland. All seven crew rescued by a helicopter from RNAS Eglington.

=== 10 December ===
List of shipwrecks: 10 December 1957
Ship	State	Description
ZAS-10	Soviet Navy	The S-class submarine was driven ashore on Paramushir, in the Kuril Islands whilst being towed from Vladivostok to Petropavlovsk by the icebreaker Dobrynya Nikitich (Soviet Navy). She was later refloated and scrapped.

=== 13 December ===
List of shipwrecks: 13 December 1957
Ship	State	Description
Servic	United Kingdom	The coaster was abandoned in the North Sea. Her three crew were rescued by the Hartlepool and Tees Lifeboats.

=== 14 December ===
List of shipwrecks: 14 December 1957
Ship	State	Description
Faithful Star	United Kingdom	The 90.3-foot (27.5 m), 103-ton trawler stranded about one-quarter mile (0.40 km) south of Orford Ness Lighthouse in strong winds and snow showers, declared a total loss after heavy seas pushed her further onto the beach.

=== 17 December ===
List of shipwrecks: 17 December 1957
Ship	State	Description
San Eduardo	Panama	The tanker ran aground north of Borneo, the Philippines. HMS Cossack (Royal Navy) went to her aid.

=== 20 December ===
List of shipwrecks: 20 December 1957
Ship	State	Description
Topeka	Norway	The cargo ship ran aground in the Karmsund, near Haugesund. All crew rescued.

=== 22 December ===
List of shipwrecks: 22 December 1957
Ship	State	Description
Empire Wansbeck	United Kingdom	The troopship ran aground at Hook of Holland, Netherlands. Later refloated and returned to service.
Narva	United Kingdom	The cargo ship foundered in the North Sea 150 nautical miles (280 km) west of Lindesnes, Norway (57°28′N 3°00′E) with the loss of all hands. She was on a voyage from Sweden to Grangemouth, Stirlingshire.

=== 24 December ===
List of shipwrecks: 24 December 1957
Ship	State	Description
Columbine	United Kingdom	The coaster ran aground at Peterhead, Aberdeenshire.

=== 25 December ===
List of shipwrecks: 25 December 1957
Ship	State	Description
Fish Mule	United States	The 34-gross register ton, 46.2-foot (14.1 m) tug sank at the entrance to Resurrection Bay on the south-central coast of the Territory of Alaska.

=== 27 December ===
List of shipwrecks: 27 December 1957
Ship	State	Description
Fletero	Argentina	The Victory ship ran aground at Tampico, Mexico.

=== Unknown date ===
List of shipwrecks: Unknown date 1957
Ship	State	Description
Continuity	United Kingdom	The coaster ran aground at Margate, Kent, England.
USS YSD-40	United States Navy	Carrying salvage equipment, the 132-foot (40 m) floating salvage derrick sank in up to 30 feet (9.1 m) of water off Martha's Vineyard, Massachusetts, between Nomans Land and Old Man Rock at 41°16′24″N 070°49′08″W.

== Unknown date ==
List of shipwrecks: Unknown date 1957
Ship	State	Description
HNLMS Jan van Brakel	Royal Netherlands Navy	The decommissioned frigate was sunk as a target bear Biak sometime after 1 August.
USS LSM-15	United States Navy	The LSM-1-class Landing Ship Medium (Transport) was raised sometime after 10 July and re-sunk in deep water off Okinawa. She had sunk in Typhoon Louise at the entrance to Buckner Bay, Okinawa, in 1945.
St. Christopher	Costa Rica	The wreck of St. Christopher as it appeared on 20 December 2012. Laid up at Ushuaia, Argentina, since 1954 due to engine trouble and rudder damage, the tugboat was beached and abandoned there.
