= HNLMS Jan van Brakel (F825) =

1981 Kortenaer-class frigate

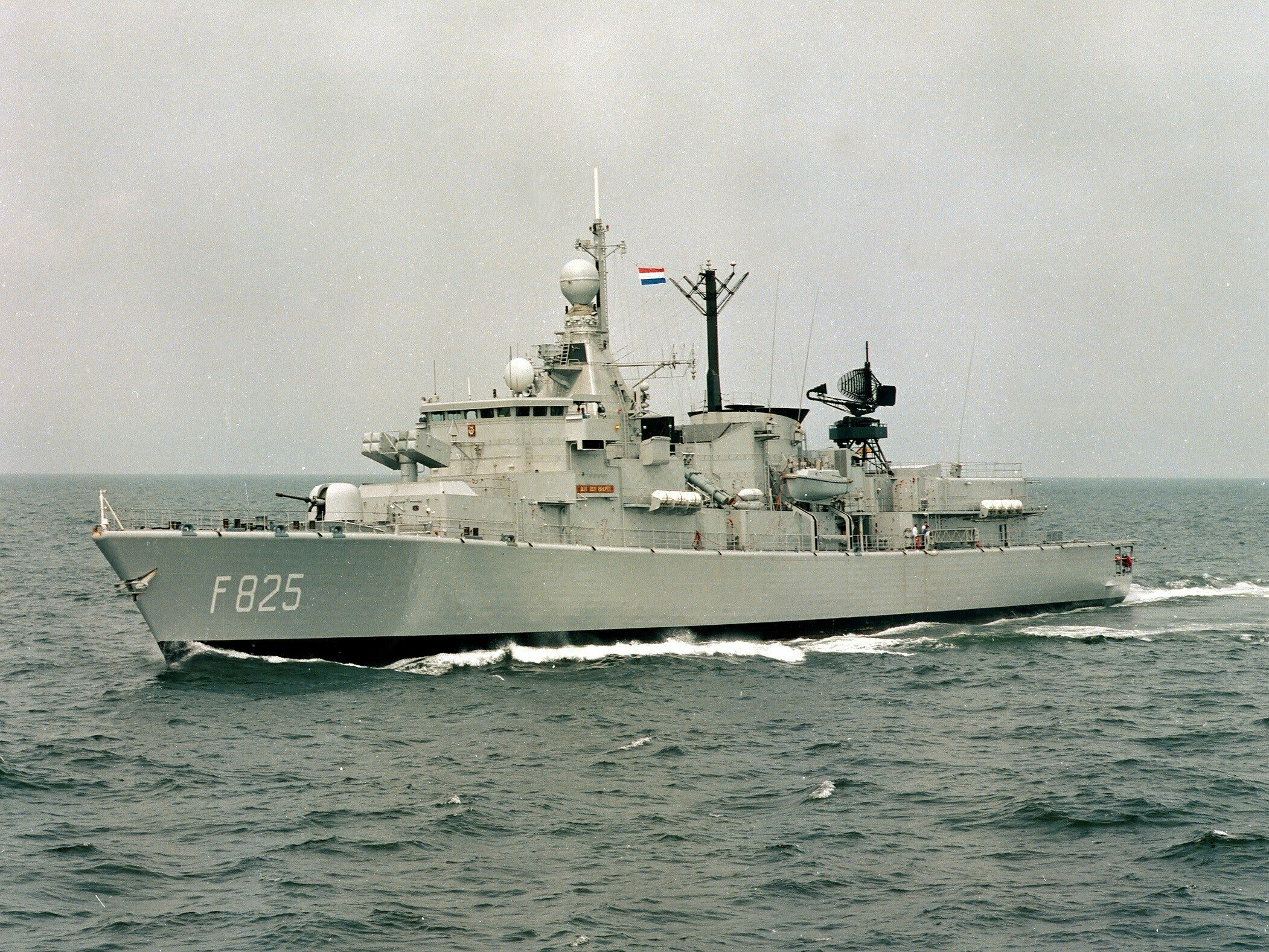
- HNLMS Jan van Brakel (F825)

History

Netherlands
- Name: HNLMS Jan van Brakel
- Namesake: Jan van Brakel
- Builder: Koninklijke Maatschappij de Schelde (KMS), Vlissingen
- Laid down: 16 November 1979
- Launched: 16 May 1981
- Commissioned: 14 April 1983
- Decommissioned: 12 October 2001
- Identification: F825
- Fate: Sold to Greece, 29 November 2002

Greece
- Name: HS Kanaris
- Namesake: Konstantinos Kanaris
- Commissioned: 29 November 2002
- Identification: F464
- Status: In active service

General characteristics
- Class & type: Kortenaer-class frigate
- Displacement: 3,500 long tons (3,600 t) standard; 3,800 long tons (3,900 t) full load
- Length: 130 m (426 ft 6 in)
- Beam: 14.4 m (47 ft 3 in)
- Draft: 4.4 m (14 ft 5 in)
- Propulsion: Combined gas or gas (COGOG) system: 2 × Rolls-Royce Tyne RM1C gas turbines, 4,900 shp (3,700 kW) each; 2 × Rolls-Royce Olympus TM3B gas turbines, 25,700 shp (19,200 kW) each (boost); 2 shafts
- Speed: 20 knots (37 km/h; 23 mph) cruise; 30 knots (56 km/h; 35 mph) maximum
- Endurance: 4,700 nautical miles at 16 knots (8,700 km at 30 km/h)
- Complement: 176–196
- Armament: 1 × OTO-Melara Compatto 76 mm/62 cal. gun; 2 × twin Mk46 torpedo tubes; 2 × quad RGM-84 Harpoon anti-ship missile launchers; 1 × 8-cell Sea Sparrow anti-aircraft missile launchers; 1 × Goalkeeper in Dutch service; 1 × Phalanx in Greek service
- Aircraft carried: 2 × Sea Lynx helicopters (1 in peacetime)

HNLMS Jan van Brakel (F825) (Dutch: Hr.Ms. Jan van Brakel) was a frigate of the Kortenaer class in service with the Royal Netherlands Navy from 1983 to 2001. She was renamed HS Kanaris (F464) (Greek: Φ/Γ Κανάρης) upon transfer to the Hellenic Navy in 2002.

== General characteristics ==
In the early 1970s, the Royal Netherlands Navy developed a 'Standard' frigate design to replace the destroyers of the Holland and Friesland classes. The 'Standard' design would have anti-submarine (the Kortenaer class) and anti-aircraft (the Jacob van Heemskerck-class) variants with different armaments on a common hull design. The first eight Kortenaers were ordered in 1974, with four more ordered in 1976, although two were sold to Greece while being built, and replaced by two of the anti-aircraft variant.

The Kortenaer's were 130.2 metres (427 ft 2 in) long overall and 121.8 metres (400 ft) between perpendiculars, with a beam) of 14.4 metres (47 ft 3 in) and a draft of 4.4 metres (14 ft 5 in). Displacement was 3,000 long tons (3,050 t) standard and 3,785 long tons (3,846 t) full load. The ship was powered by two 25,800 shaft horsepower (19,200 kW) Rolls-Royce Olympus TM 3B and two 4,900 shaft horsepower (3,700 kW) Rolls-Royce Tyne TM 1C gas turbines in a combined gas or gas (COGOG) arrangement, driving two propeller shafts. The Olympus engines gave a speed of 30 knots (35 mph; 56 km/h), and the Tyne cruise engines gave a speed of 20 knots (23 mph; 37 km/h).

== Dutch service history ==
HNLMS Jan van Brakel was built at the KM de Schelde in Vlissingen. She was named after Jan van Brakel, a Dutch naval commander from the seventeenth century. The keel laying took place on 16 November 1979, and she was launched on 16 May 1981. The ship was put into service on 14 April 1983.

In 1988, she made a trip to the Far East and Australia to show the flag and for training, with the frigates Kortenaer & Witte de With and the replenishment ship Zuiderkruis. From March-October 1993, she was deployed in the Adriatic Sea, supporting NATO and UN operations in Yugoslavia.

On 12 October 2001, she was decommissioned and sold to the Hellenic Navy.

== Greek service history ==
The ship was commissioned into the Hellenic Navy on 29 November 2002 and renamed HS Kanaris (Greek: Φ/Γ Κανάρης) after Konstantinos Kanaris, a hero of the Greek War of Independence and later Prime Minister of Greece. She was assigned the radio call sign "SZDT".

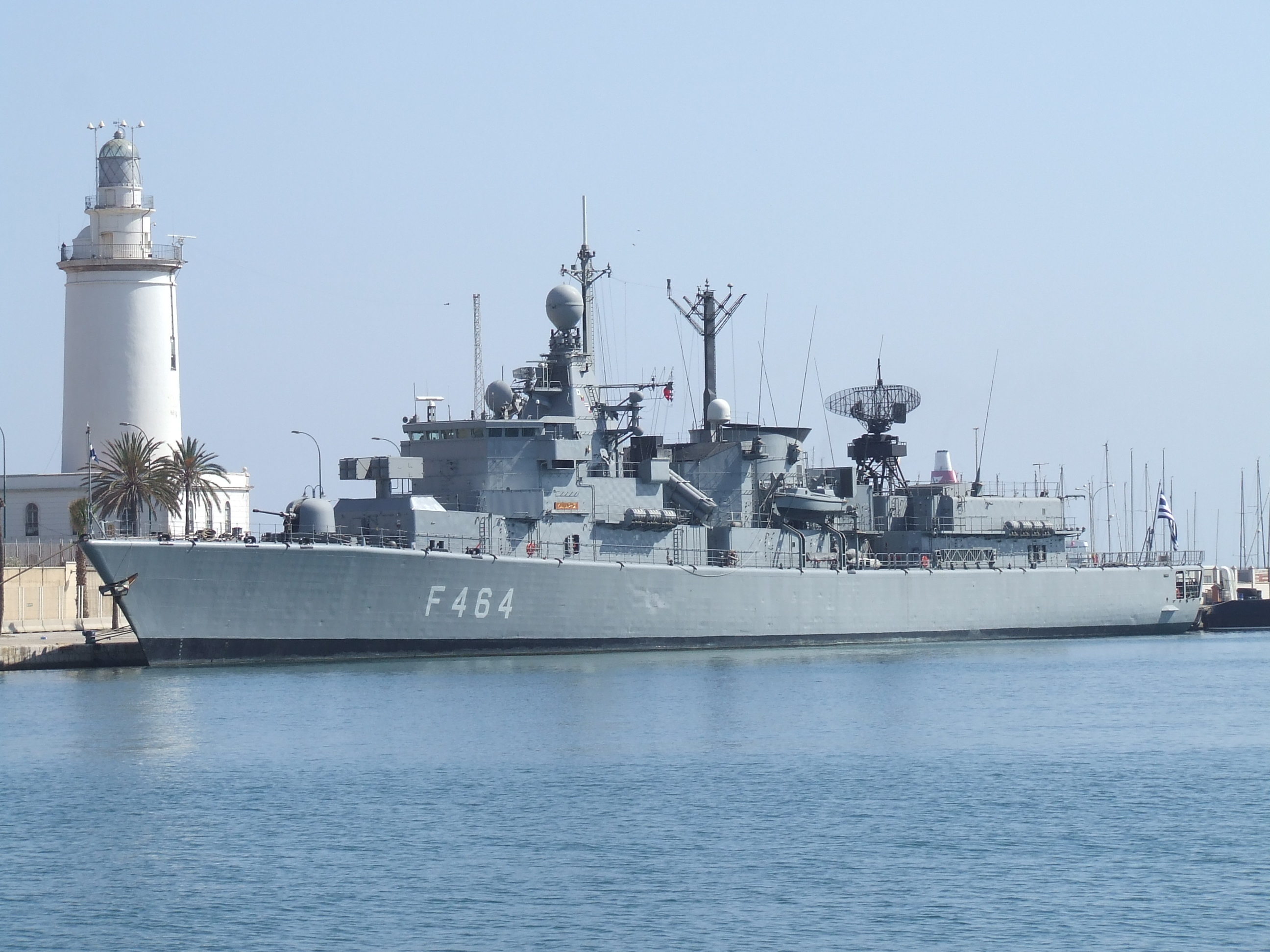
Hellenic Navy frigate HS Kanaris (Φ/Γ Κανάρης) in Málaga.

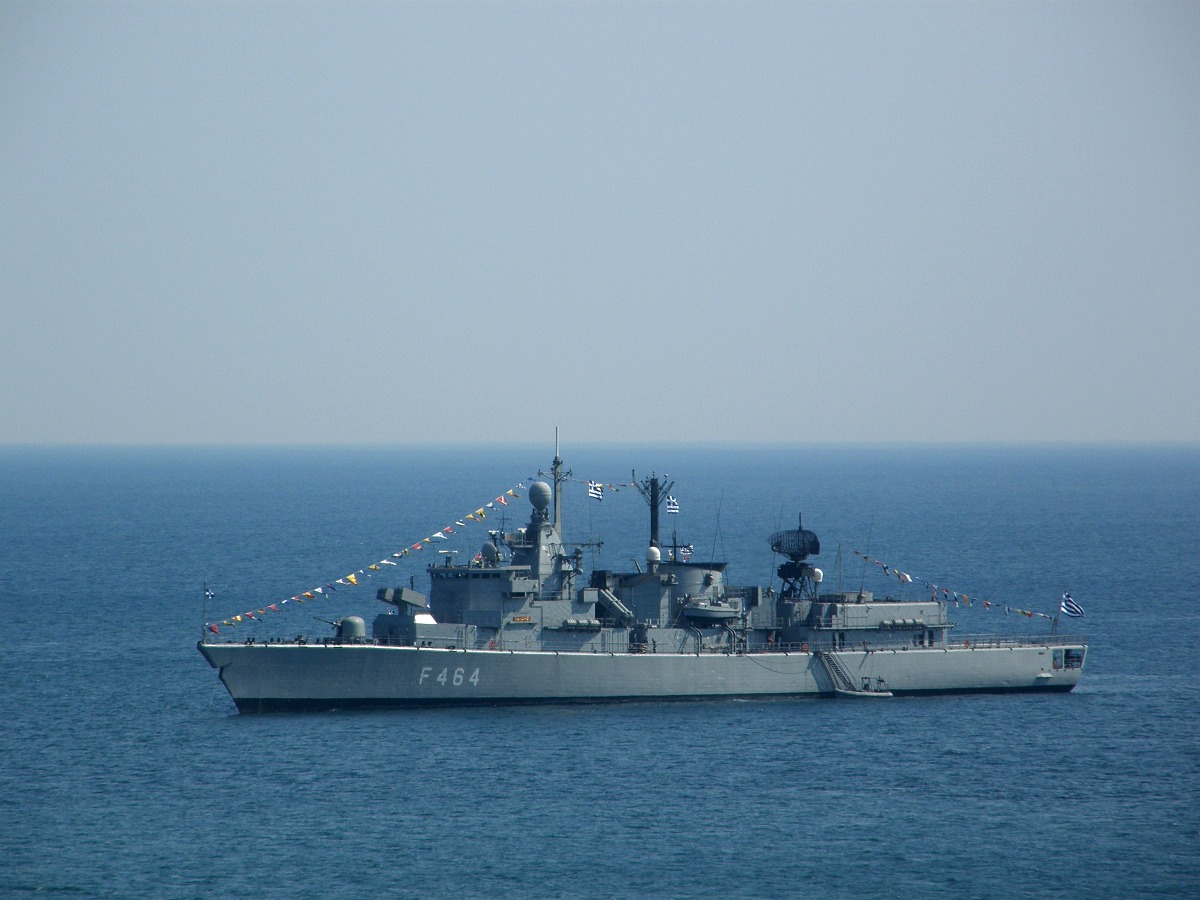
Hellenic Navy frigate HS Kanaris (Φ/Γ Κανάρης) at Phaleron Bay.

== See also ==
- List of active Hellenic Navy ships
- Elli-class frigate
