= HNLMS Jan van Brakel (1936) =

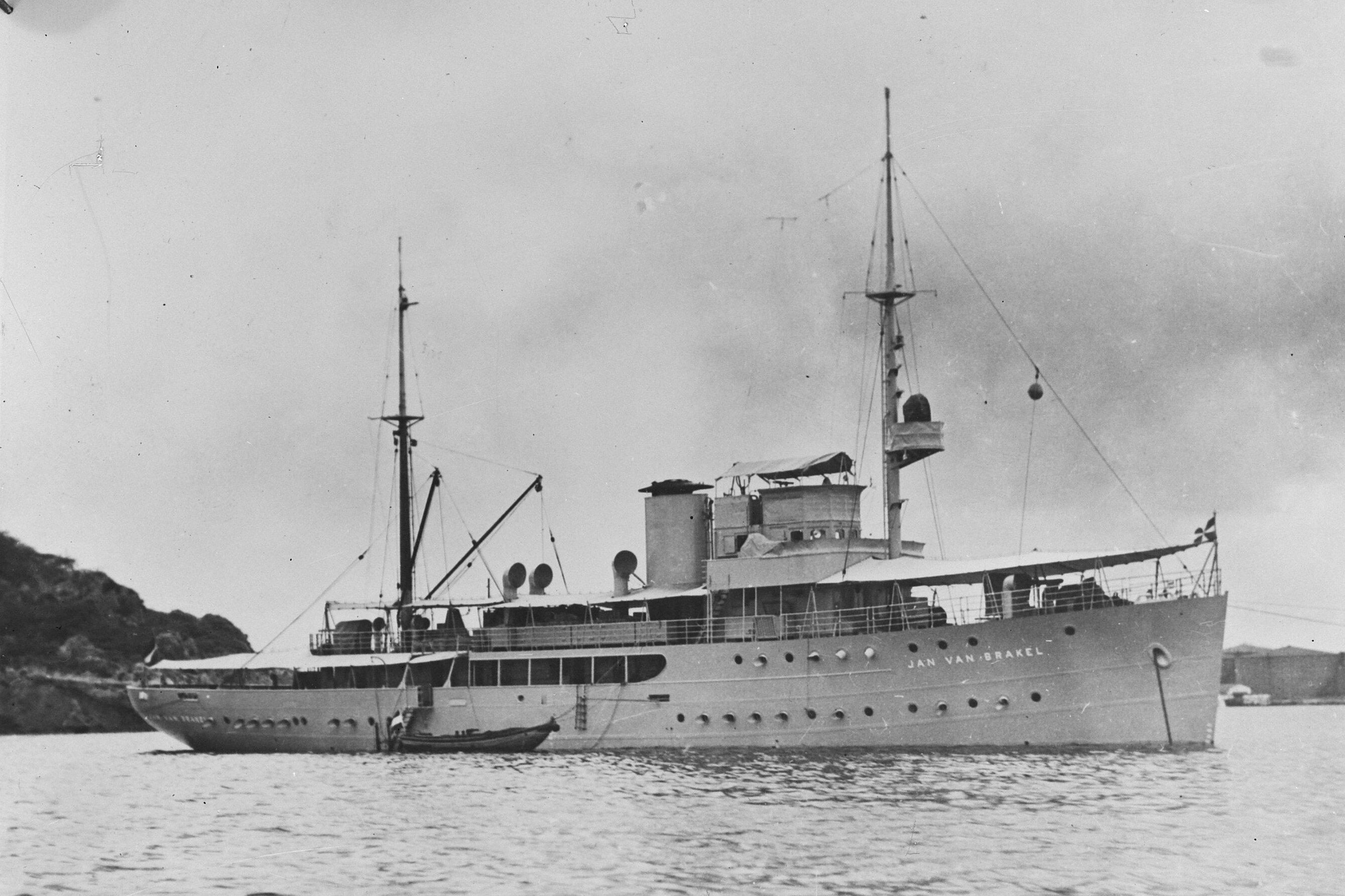
- Jan van Brakel

History

Netherlands
- Name: Jan van Brakel
- Namesake: Jan van Brakel
- Operator: Royal Netherlands Navy
- Builder: Koninklijke Maatschappij De Schelde, Vlissingen
- Yard number: 201
- Laid down: 23 May 1935
- Launched: 8 February 1936
- Commissioned: 25 June 1936
- Decommissioned: 1 August 1957
- Fate: Expended as a target ship near Biak in 1957

General characteristics
- Type: Minelayer and patrol vessel
- Displacement: 715 t (704 long tons) standard; 955 t (940 long tons) full load
- Length: 58.70 m (192 ft 7 in)
- Beam: 10 m (32 ft 10 in)
- Draught: 3.45 m (11 ft 4 in)
- Propulsion: 2 propellers; 1,600 hp (1,200 kW); 2 x Triple expansion engines; 2 x Yarrow steam boilers
- Speed: 15 knots (28 km/h; 17 mph)
- Crew: 65
- Armament: 2 x 7.5 cm cannons; 1 x 3.7 cm cannon; 4 x 12.7 mm machine guns; 60 mines

HNLMS Jan van Brakel was a minelayer and patrol vessel (Note: The ship was classified in Dutch under different names, such as politievaartuig, politiekruiser or visserijpolitiekruiser.) of the Royal Netherlands Navy (RNN). She was built in the Netherlands and served in the RNN between 1936 and 1957.

== Design and construction ==
Jan van Brakel was built at the Koninklijke Maatschappij De Schelde and assigned yard number 201. The ship was laid down on 23 May 1935, launched on 8 February 1936 and commissioned into the Royal Netherlands Navy on 25 June 1936. Jan van Brakel was designed to function as both a minelayer and patrol vessel.

The ship was named after Jan van Brakel, a famous Dutch captain from the 17th century who took part in the Raid on the Medway.

=== Propulsion ===
The ship had two Yarrow steam boilers that could deliver 800 hp each, for a total of 1600 hp. This allowed Jan van Brakel to reach a speed of 15 kn.

=== Armament ===
When it came to armaments Jan van Brakel was equipped with two 7.5 cm cannons, a single 3.7 cm cannon and four 12.7 mm machine guns. In addition, it could carry 60 mines.

== Service history ==
As patrol vessel Jan van Brakel monitored fisheries in the North Sea.

=== Second World War ===
On 12 May 1940 the ship laid 80 mines in the waters west of Haaksgronden. Two days later, on 14 May 1940, Jan van Brakel left for England. There the ship was made ready in Portsmouth to be able to lay British mines.

On 1 June 1940 Jan van Brakel left Portsmouth for the River Tyne to lay mines if needed. Later it also performed escorting duties for allied convoys in British waters. In April 1942 the ship left for Curaçao to escort allied convoys in the waters of the Caribbean. After two years of being active in the West Indies, Jan van Brakel returned at the end of 1944 to England and was rebuilt as a mother ship for minesweepers.

After the Netherlands was liberated Jan van Brakel functioned as mother ship for other minesweepers and was stationed at Terschelling. However, this was only for a short duration as the ship left on 14 October 1945 for the Dutch East Indies together with eight minesweepers. On 28 January 1946 they arrived and began clearing minefields that were still present in the territorial waters of the Dutch East Indies. Later Jan van Brakel was also used as hydrographic survey vessel.

In 1951 the ship returned to the Netherlands and was rebuilt as a small frigate, among other modifications her front cannon was replaced by a 10.5 cm cannon. After being taken back into service in April 1953 it fulfilled the same duties as it did before the Second World War.

In June 1955 the ship left for Dutch New Guinea and performed patrol duties.

On 1 August 1957 Jan van Brakel was decommissioned and afterwards used as target ship near Biak.
