= HNLMS Witte de With (F813) =

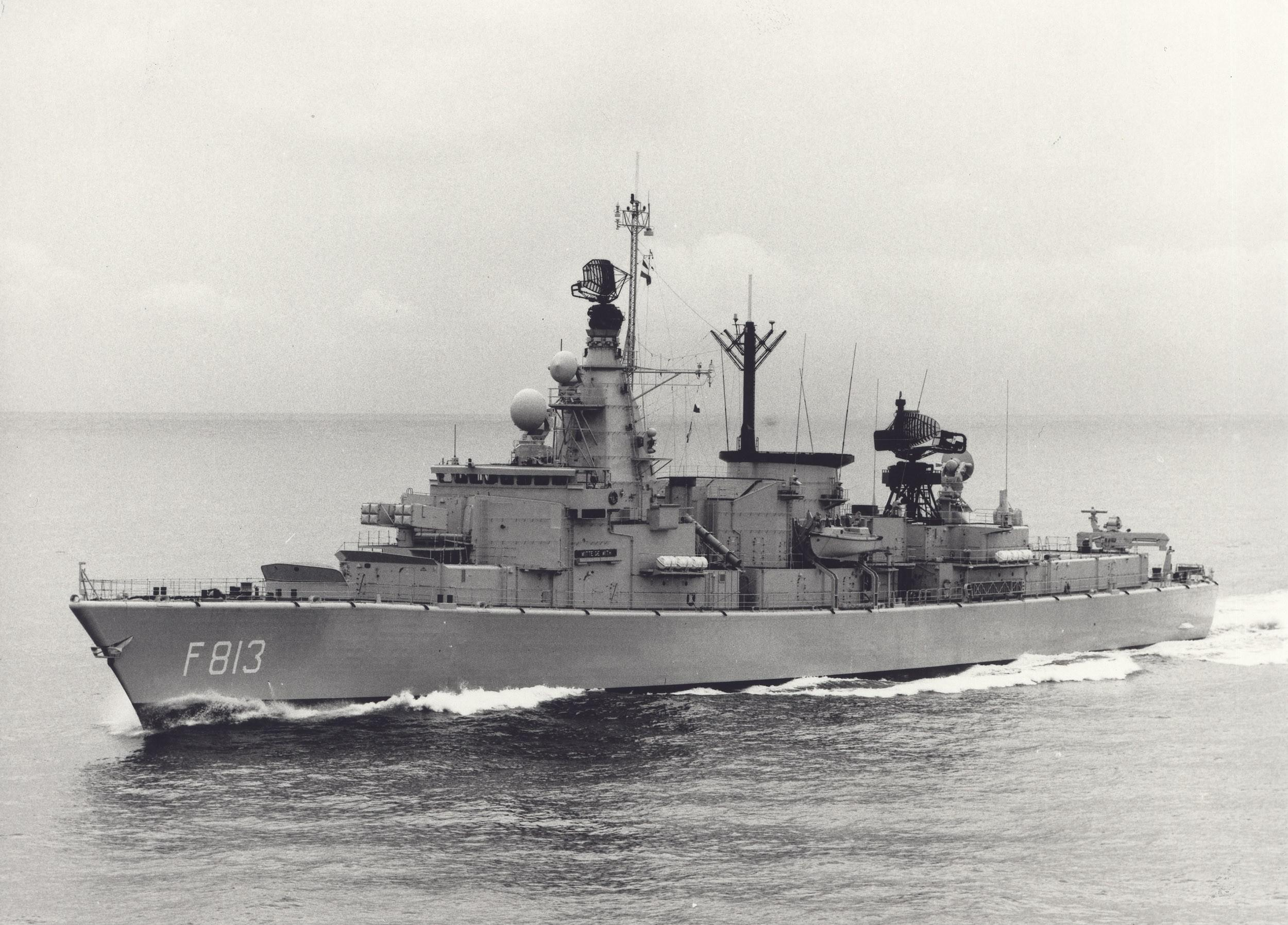
- HNLMS Witte de With at sea

History

Netherlands
- Name: Witte de With
- Namesake: Witte Corneliszoon de With
- Builder: KM de Schelde, Vlissingen
- Laid down: 15 December 1981
- Launched: 25 August 1984
- Commissioned: 17 September 1986
- Decommissioned: 12 May 2006
- Fate: Sold to the Chilean Navy

Chile
- Name: Capitán Prat
- Namesake: Arturo Prat
- Commissioned: 17 July 2006
- Decommissioned: 2020
- Identification: FFG-11
- Status: retired

General characteristics
- Type: Jacob van Heemskerck class
- Displacement: 3,000 tons standard; 3,750 tons full load
- Length: 130 m (426 ft 6 in)
- Beam: 14.5 m (47 ft 7 in)
- Draught: 4.4 m (14 ft 5 in)
- Propulsion: 2 shaft Combined gas or gas (COGOG) system: 2 Rolls-Royce Tyne RM1C gas turbines, 4,900 shp (3,700 kW) each; 2 Rolls-Royce Olympus TM3B gas turbines, 25,700 shp (19,200 kW) each (boost)
- Speed: 30 kn (56 km/h; 35 mph) maximum; 20 kn (37 km/h; 23 mph) cruising
- Range: 4,700 nmi (8,700 km; 5,400 mi) at 16 kn (30 km/h; 18 mph)
- Complement: 197
- Sensors & processing systems: Radar; LW-08; SMART-S Mk1; 2 x STIR-240; STIR-180; ZW-06; Sonar; PHS-36
- Armament: 4 × Mk46 torpedo tubes (2 twin mounts); 8 × RGM-84 Harpoon anti-ship missile launchers (2 quad mounts); 1 × RIM-66 Standard SAM from a Mk13 Guided Missile Launch System (40 missiles total); 8 × RIM-7 NATO Sea Sparrow SAM from a Mk29 Guided Missile Launch System (8 missile in the launcher and 16 in the magazine); 1 × Goalkeeper 30 mm CIWS gun system; 2 × 20 mm guns

HNLMS Witte de With (F813) (Dutch: Hr.Ms. Witte de With) was a frigate of the Jacob van Heemskerck class. The ship was in service with the Royal Netherlands Navy from 1986 to 2006. The frigate was named after Dutch naval hero Witte Corneliszoon de With.

In subsequent Chilean Navy service, the ship was called Capitán Prat.

== Dutch service history ==
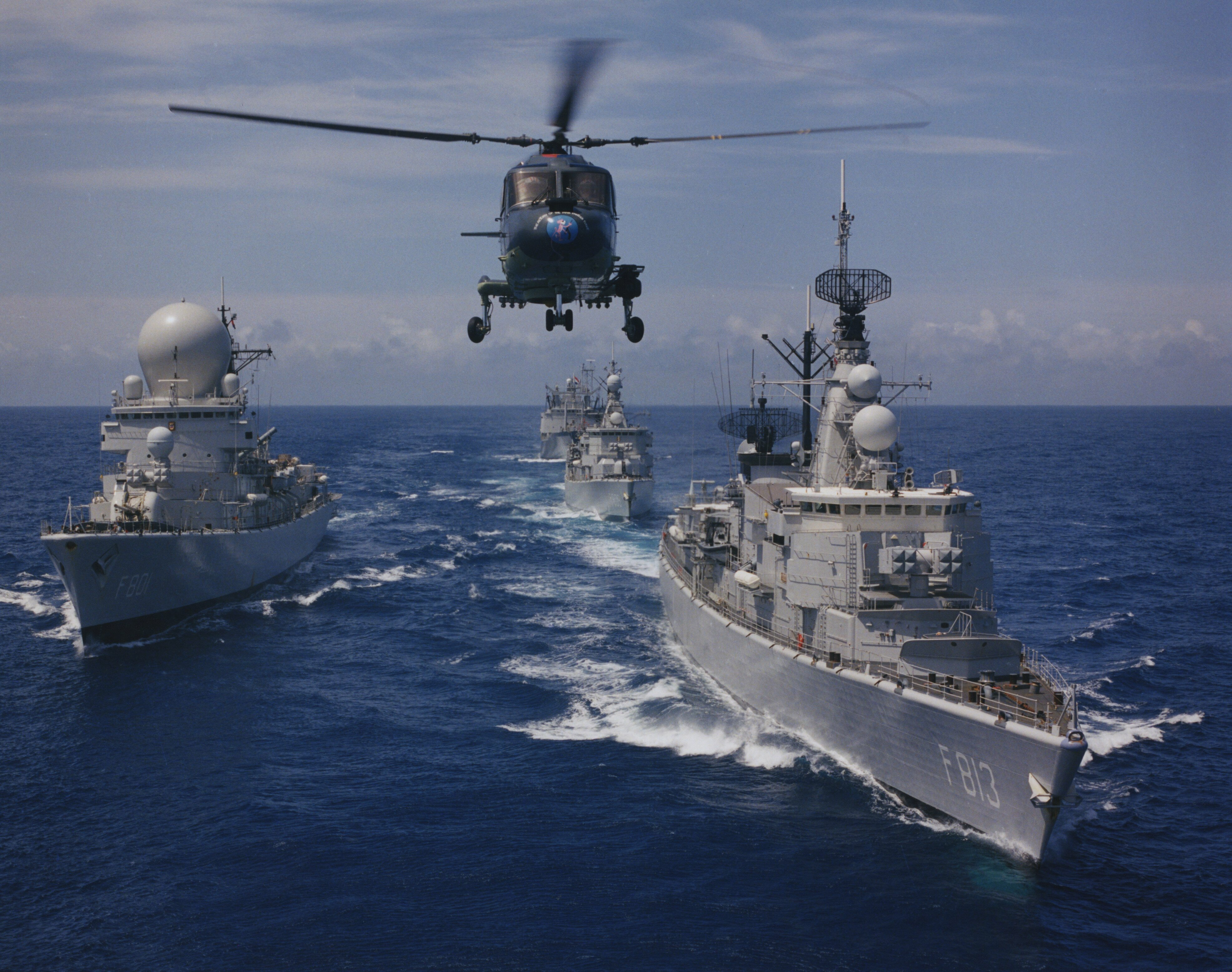
Witte de With alongside Tromp in 1992.

HNLMS Witte de With was one of two Jacob van Heemskerck-class frigates and was built at the KM de Schelde in Vlissingen. The keel laying took place on 15 December 1981 and the launching on 25 August 1984. The ship was put into service on 17 September 1986. The ship's radio call sign was "PAVP".

The ship participated in Operation Desert Shield/Storm from September 1990 to December 1990. and Operation Sharp Guard in July 1993

In 1988 Witte de With and the frigates Jan van Brakel and Kortenaer and the replenishment ship Zuiderkruis made a trip to the far east visiting Egypt, India, Indonesia, Australia and New Zealand to show the flag and for practice.

On 12 May 2006 the vessel was decommissioned and sold to the Chilean Navy.

== Chilean service history ==
The ship was put into service on 17 July 2006 where the ship was renamed Capitán Prat using the radio call sign was "CCPT".
