= HNLMS Jacob van Heemskerck (F812) =

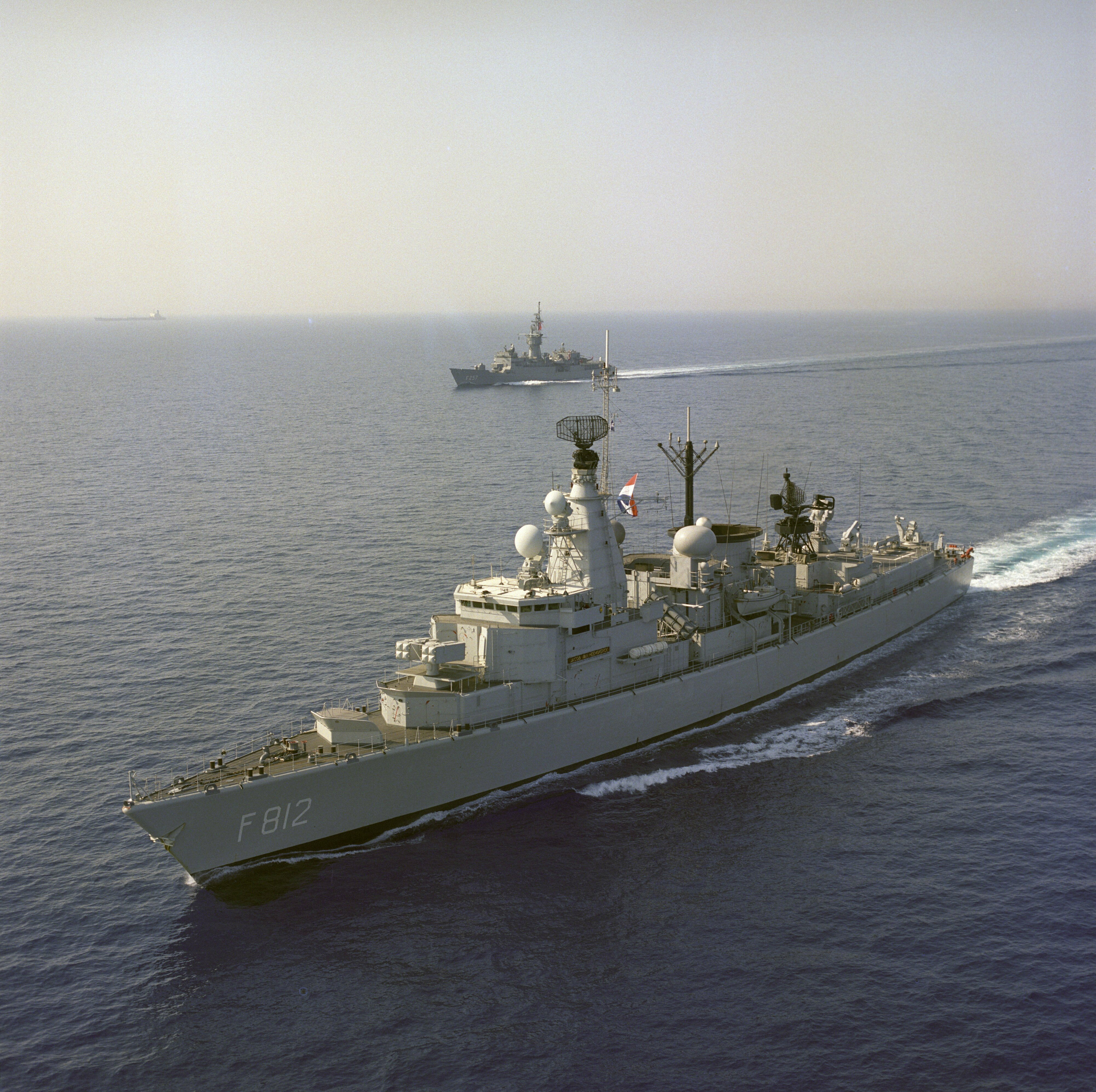
- Jacob van Heemskerck in 1995

History

Netherlands
- Name: Jacob van Heemskerck
- Namesake: Jacob van Heemskerk
- Builder: KM de Schelde, Vlissingen
- Laid down: 21 January 1981
- Launched: 5 November 1983
- Commissioned: 15 January 1986
- Decommissioned: 2 December 2004
- Fate: Sold to the Chilean Navy

Chile
- Name: Almirante Latorre
- Namesake: Juan José Latorre
- Commissioned: 16 December 2005
- Decommissioned: January 2020
- Identification: FFG-14
- Status: Decommissioned

General characteristics
- Type: Jacob van Heemskerck class
- Displacement: 3,000 tons standard; 3,750 tons full load
- Length: 130 m (426 ft 6 in)
- Beam: 14.5 m (47 ft 7 in)
- Draught: 4.4 m (14 ft 5 in)
- Propulsion: 2 shaft Combined gas or gas (COGOG) system: 2 Rolls-Royce Tyne RM1C gas turbines, 4,900 shp (3,700 kW) each; 2 Rolls-Royce Olympus TM3B gas turbines, 25,700 shp (19,200 kW) each (boost)
- Speed: 30 kn (56 km/h; 35 mph) maximum; 20 kn (37 km/h; 23 mph) cruising
- Range: 4,700 nmi (8,700 km; 5,400 mi) at 16 kn (30 km/h; 18 mph)
- Complement: 197
- Sensors & processing systems: Radar; LW-08; SMART-S Mk1; 2 x STIR-240; STIR-180; ZW-06; Sonar; PHS-36
- Armament: 4 × Mk46 torpedo tubes (2 twin mounts); 8 × RGM-84 Harpoon anti-ship missile launchers (2 quad mounts); 1 × RIM-66 Standard SAM from a Mk13 Guided Missile Launch System (40 missiles total); 8 × RIM-7 NATO Sea Sparrow SAM from a Mk29 Guided Missile Launch System (8 missile in the launcher and 16 in the magazine); 1 × Goalkeeper 30 mm CIWS gun system; 2 × 20 mm guns

HNLMS Jacob van Heemskerck (F812) (Dutch: Hr.Ms. Jacob van Heemskerck) was a frigate of the Jacob van Heemskerck class. The ship was in service with the Royal Netherlands Navy from 1986 to 2004. The frigate was named after Dutch naval hero Jacob van Heemskerck.

In subsequent Chilean Navy service, the ship was called Almirante Latorre.

== Dutch service history ==
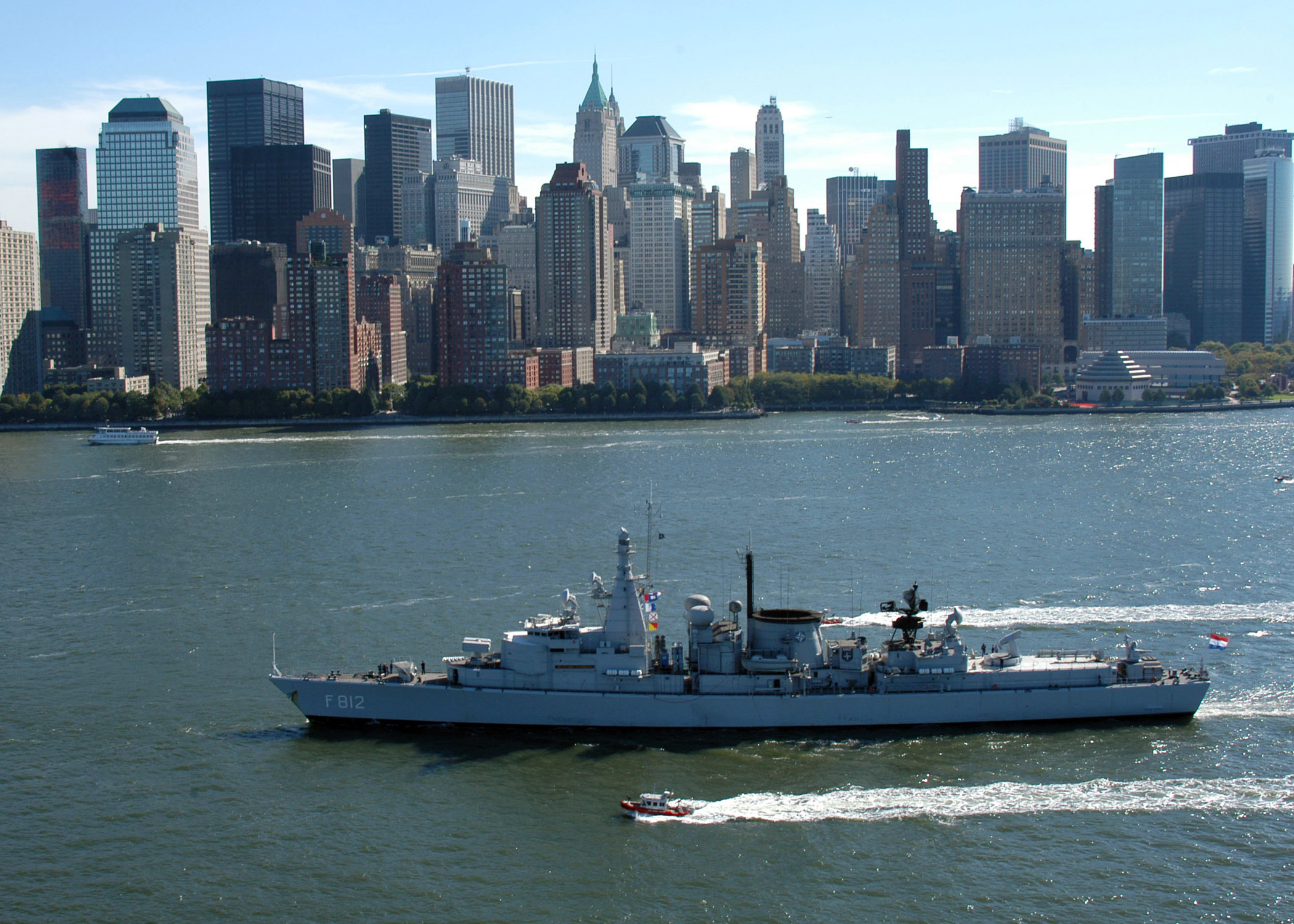
Jacob van Heemskerck in New York, 2004

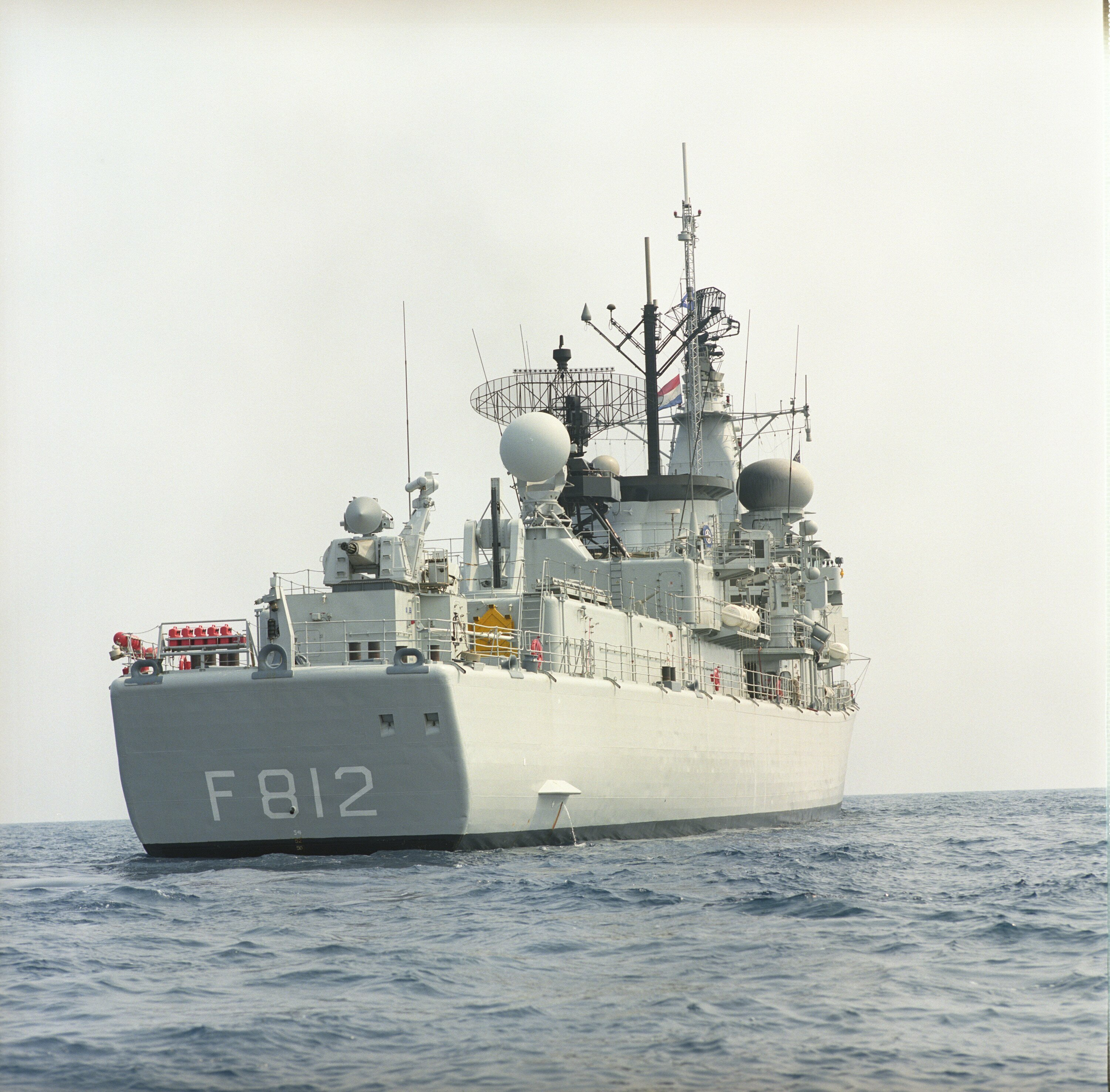
View from the stern; defensive armament visible.

HNLMS Jacob van Heemskerck was one of two Jacob van Heemskerck-class frigates and was built at the KM de Schelde in Vlissingen. The keel laying took place on 21 January 1981 and the launching on 5 November 1983. The ship was put into service on 15 January 1986. The ship's radio call sign was "PAVO".

In the early 90s the ship participated in Operation Desert Storm.

In 1996 she made a trip to Norway with the frigates Bloys van Treslong, Willem van der Zaan, Tromp and the replenishment ship Amsterdam.

After the September 11 attacks the ship became part of Standing Naval Force Atlantic (STANAVFORLANT) for which she was sent to the eastern parts of the Mediterranean Sea where she participated in operation Direct Endeavour.

In 2003 she served for five months as flagship of the Standing Naval Force Mediterranean (STANAVFORMED). She served as the flagship for STANAVFORLANT in 2004 for six months.

On 2 December 2004 the vessel was decommissioned was and sold to the Chilean Navy.

== Chilean service history ==
The ship was put into service on 16 December 2005 where the ship was renamed Almirante Latorre, using the radio call sign "CCLT".

In 2025 it is reported that the CNS Almirante Latorre was decommissioned and have been sunk as a target.
