= Jacob van Heemskerck-class frigate =

1983 class of Dutch frigates

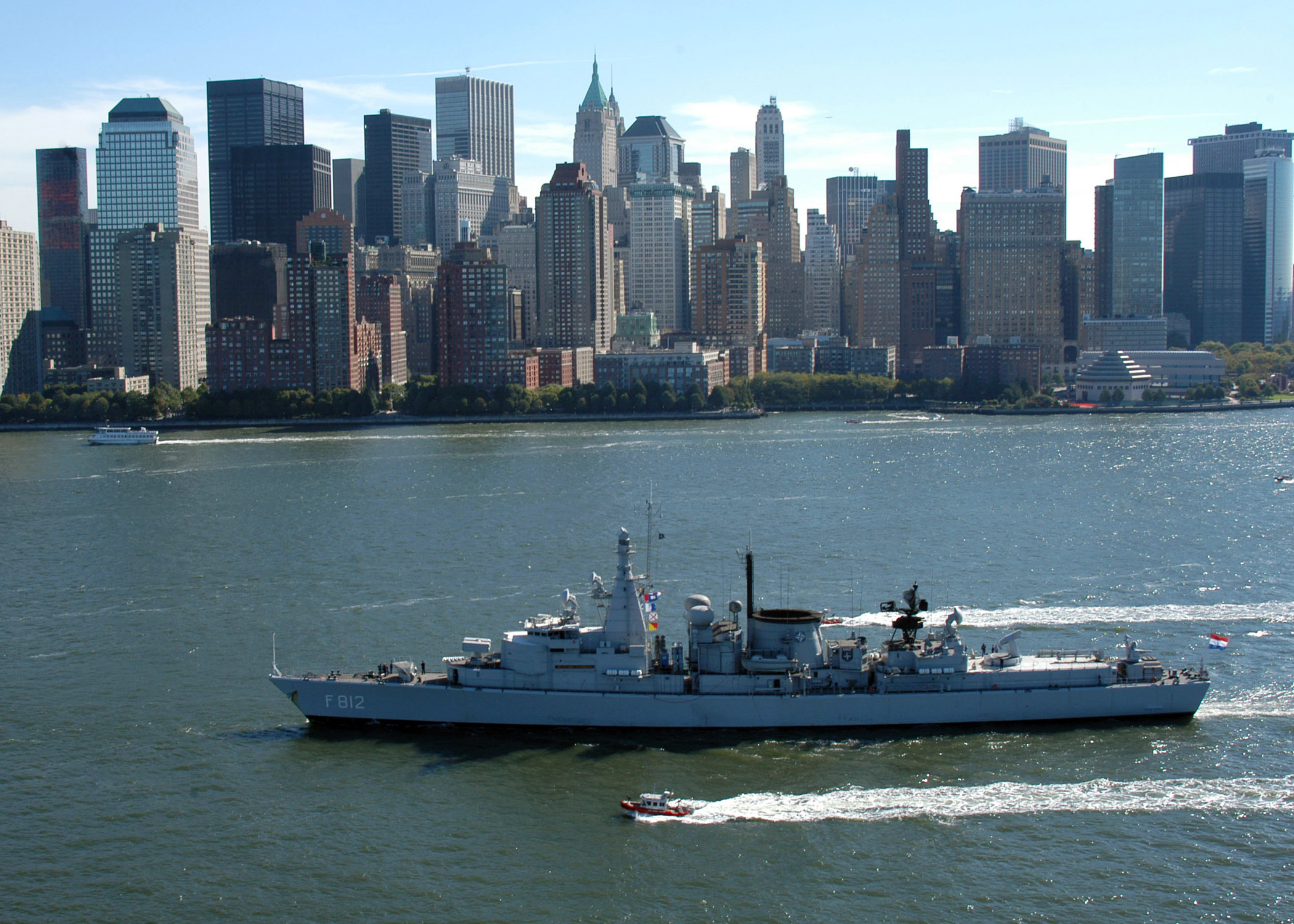
- Jacob van Heemskerck in New York, 2004

Class overview
- Name: Jacob van Heemskerck class (L type)
- Builders: Royal Schelde Shipyard
- Operators: Royal Netherlands Navy; Chilean Navy
- Preceded by: Tromp-class frigate
- Succeeded by: De Zeven Provinciën-class
- Built: 1981-1986
- In commission: 1986-2020
- Planned: 2
- Completed: 2
- Retired: 2

General characteristics
- Type: Anti-aircraft warfare (AAW) frigate
- Displacement: 3,000 tons standard; 3,750 tons full load
- Length: 130 m (426 ft 6 in)
- Beam: 14.5 m (47 ft 7 in)
- Draught: 4.4 m (14 ft 5 in)
- Propulsion: 2 shaft Combined gas or gas (COGOG) system: 2 Rolls-Royce Tyne RM1C gas turbines, 4,900 shp (3,700 kW) each; 2 Rolls-Royce Olympus TM3B gas turbines, 25,700 shp (19,200 kW) each (boost)
- Speed: 30 kn (56 km/h; 35 mph) maximum; 20 kn (37 km/h; 23 mph) cruising
- Range: 4,700 nmi (8,700 km; 5,400 mi) at 16 kn (30 km/h; 18 mph)
- Complement: 197
- Sensors & processing systems: Radar; LW-08; SMART-S Mk1; 2 x STIR-240; STIR-180; ZW-06; Sonar; PHS-36
- Armament: 4 × Mk46 torpedo tubes (2 twin mounts); 8 × RGM-84 Harpoon anti-ship missile launchers (2 quad mounts); 1 × RIM-66 Standard SAM from a Mk13 Guided Missile Launch System (40 missiles total); 8 × RIM-7 NATO Sea Sparrow SAM from a Mk29 Guided Missile Launch System (8 missile in the launcher and 16 in the magazine); 1 × Goalkeeper 30 mm CIWS gun system; 2 × 20 mm guns

The Jacob van Heemskerck-class frigate was a class of frigates of the Royal Netherlands Navy. They were designed to be an air defence version of the Kortenaer class. The helicopter was replaced by a Standard medium range surface-to-air missile (SAM) system and associated radars. Two ships were built for the Royal Netherlands Navy. In 2005 they were sold to the Chilean Navy.

== Design ==
In the early 1970s, the Koninklijke Marine (Royal Netherlands Navy) developed what became known as the 'Standard' frigate, with anti-submarine and anti-aircraft versions using common hull designs and machinery and as far as practicable, common electronics and sensors. It was planned to order 12 anti-submarine variants (the Kortenaer class), enough to equip two task groups (each led by a Tromp-class guided-missile frigate) to operate in the Atlantic, while a single anti-aircraft version would act as flagship for a third task group, consisting of the older Van Speijk-class frigates to operate in the English Channel and North Sea. In 1981, however, two Kortenaers were sold to Greece while building, and it was decided to build two anti-aircraft versions of the 'Standard' class (the 'L' class) as replacements, with the planned thirteenth 'Standard'-class frigate being abandoned.

The design's flush-decked hull, with an overall length of 130.20 metres (427.2 ft), a beam of 14.40 metres (47.2 ft) and draught of 4.23 metres (13.9 ft), is the same as used in the Kortenaers, as was the Combined gas and gas (COGAG) machinery, with two Rolls-Royce Tyne RM-1C cruise engines (3,700 kilowatts (4,900 shp)) and two Rolls-Royce Olympus TM-3 boost engines (19,200 kilowatts (25,800 shp)) drive the ship to a speed of 30 knots (35 mph; 56 km/h).

A Mk 13 missile launcher for the American Standard SM-1 medium-range surface-to-air missile (SAM) (with a 40-missile magazine) replaced the helicopter hangar and deck of the Kortenaers. This was supplemented by an eight round Mk 29 NATO Sea Sparrow short range SAM launcher forward, with 24 missiles carried. A Goalkeeper close-in weapon system was mounted aft, while the forward-mounted OTO Melara 76 mm gun of the Kortenaers was omitted. Launchers for eight Harpoon anti-ship missiles were positioned amidships, while anti-submarine armament consisted of four tubes for Mark 46 torpedoes.

As built, the ships were fitted with a Signaal LW-08 long-range air search radar, a DA-05 target tracking radar. Two STIR-240 director radars provided guidance for the Standard missiles, while a STIR-180 radar directed the Sea Sparrow missiles. A PHS-36 hull sonar was also fitted. In the nineties the DA-05 radar was replaced by the new SMART tracking radar.

== Service history ==
In 2018 the Chilean navy was looking at options to either replace the Jacob van Heemskerck-class frigates or modernize them. At the end of 2019 they were both taken out of service. They were replaced with two Adelaide-class frigates purchased from Australia.

== Ships ==
Two ships were built by Royal Schelde dockyard. The ships were named after Admirals (Jacob van Heemskerk and Witte Corneliszoon de With) as is usual practice in the Royal Netherlands Navy.

Jacob van Heemskerck-class frigates
Name	Customer	Laid down	Launched	Commissioned	Fate	Note
Jacob van Heemskerck	Royal Netherlands Navy	21 January 1981	5 November 1983	15 January 1986	Decommissioned in 2004. Sold to Chile in 2005.	Renamed Almirante Latorre (namesake: Juan José Latorre, pennant number: FFG-14) in Chilean Navy service.The ship was retired of the fleet at the end of 2019. Decommissioned.
Witte de With	Royal Netherlands Navy	15 December 1981	25 August 1984	17 September 1986	Decommissioned in 2005. Sold to Chile in 2005.	Renamed Capitán Prat (namesake: Arturo Prat, pennant number: FFG-11) in Chilean Navy service. The ship was retired of the fleet at the end of 2019. Decommissioned.

== Gallery ==
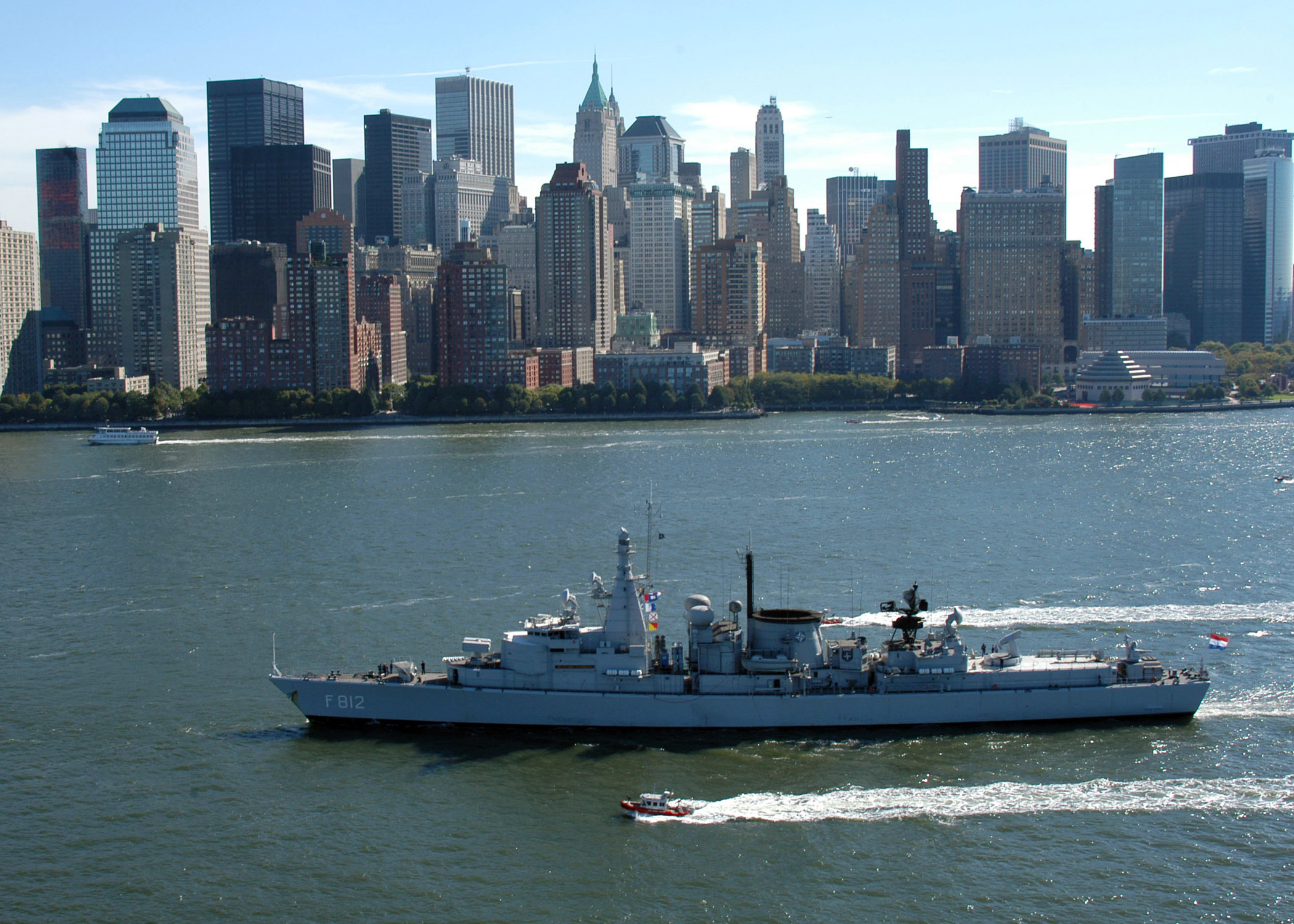
Jacob van Heemskerck (F812) in New York, 2004

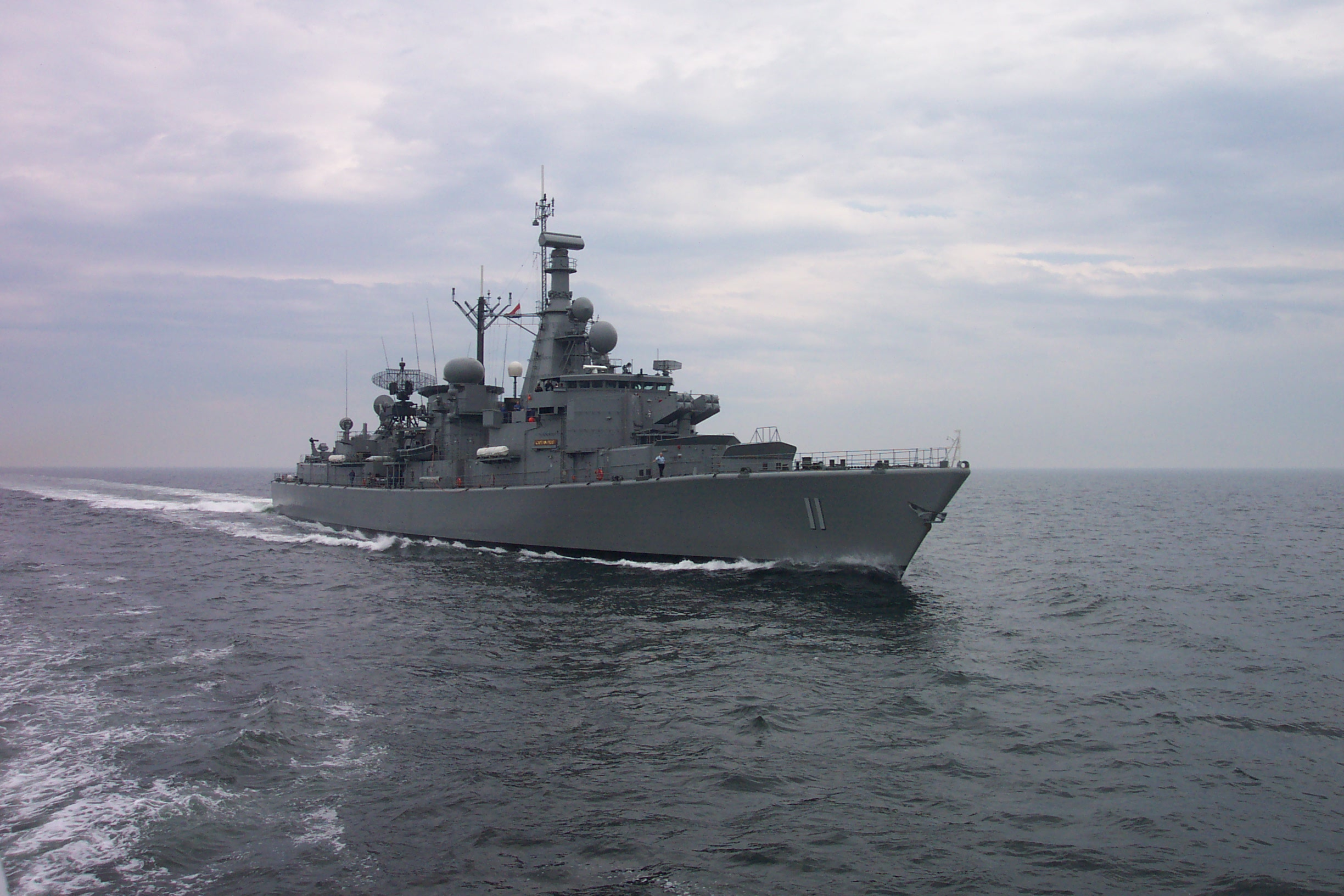
Capitan Prat on the North Sea

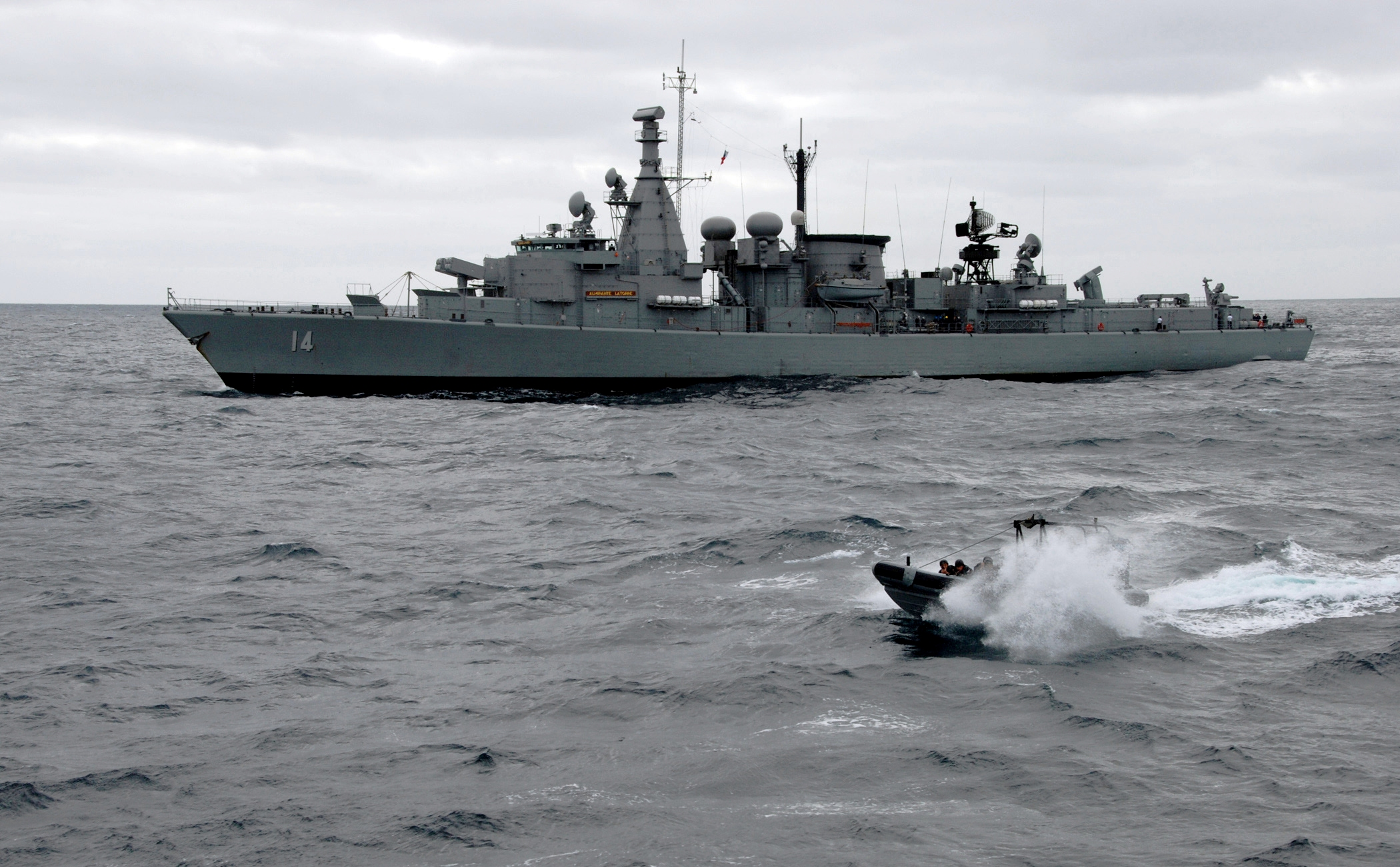
Almirante Latorre (FFG 14), 2007

== See also ==
- List of frigates of the Netherlands
- Kortenaer-class frigates - The Jacob van Heemskerck-class is based on this design, with only slight modifications.

Equivalent frigates of the same era

- Santa María class
- Godavari class
- Adelaide class
- Cassard class
- Cheng Kung class
