= Jan van Brakel =

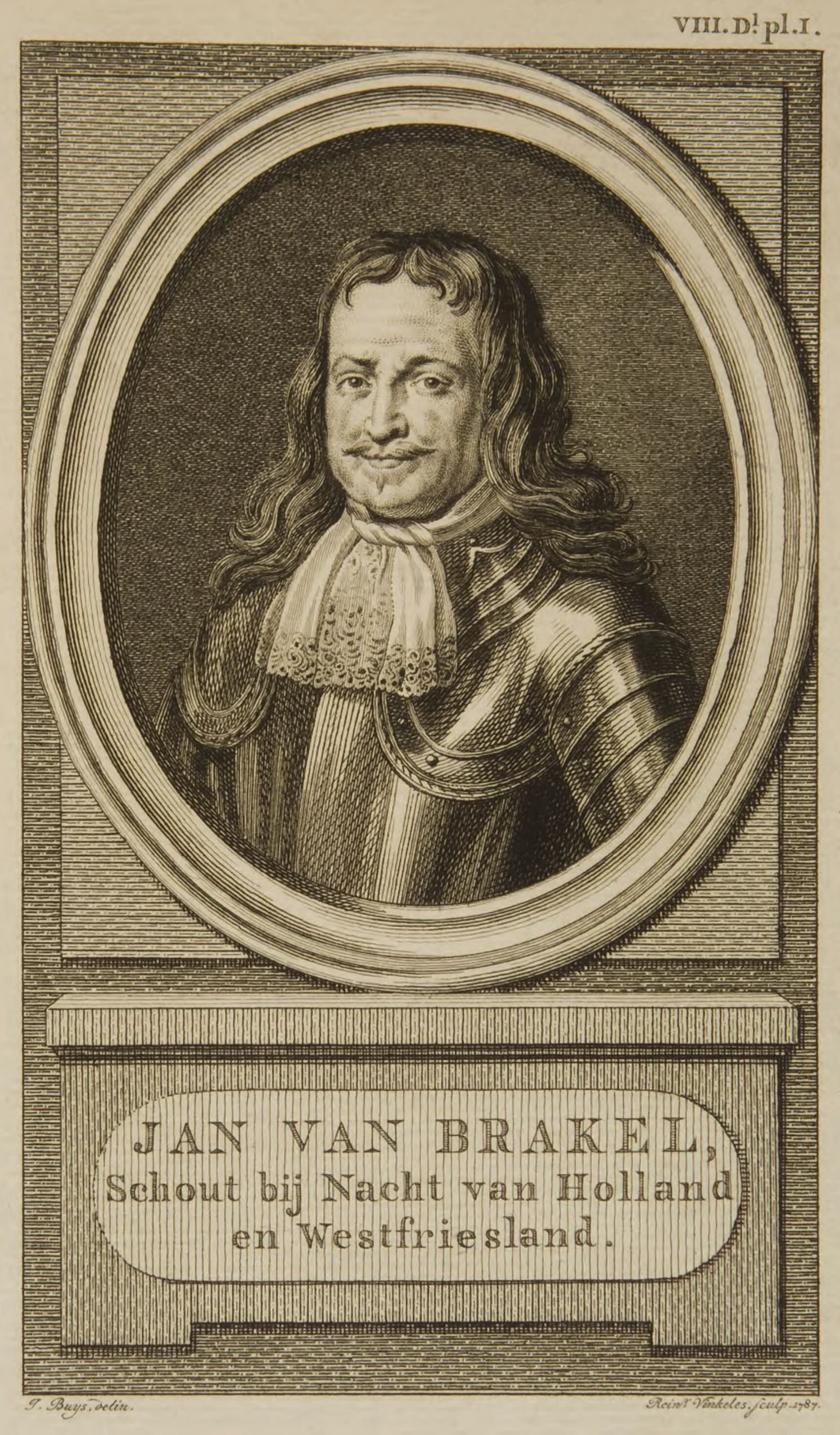
- Born: c. 1618–1642; Rotterdam, Dutch Republic
- Died: 10 July 1690; Beachy Head, United Kingdom
- Military career
- Allegiance: Dutch Republic
- Branch: Dutch State Navy
- Service years: 1665–1690
- Rank: Rear admiral
- Wars: Second Anglo-Dutch War; Third Anglo-Dutch War; Nine Years' War †

Jan van Brakel (c. 1638 – 10 July 1690) was a Dutch States Navy officer who distinguished himself on many occasions during the Second Anglo-Dutch War, the Third Anglo-Dutch War and the Nine Years War.

== Early life ==
Almost nothing is known about Van Brakel's early career; we know neither his year of birth—estimates have varied from 1618 to 1642—nor his backgrounds. It used to be thought that he was the son of Commodore Pieter van Brakel, who was killed in the Second Anglo-Dutch War while defending a convoy of merchant ships, but this has become very unlikely considering Pieter was born in 1624.

== Naval career ==
The first time Van Brakel appears in the documents is in 1666, when he was appointed by the Admiralty of the Maze as acting captain—with the rank of lieutenant—of a fireship, the Rotterdam, that participated in the Four Days Battle. Apparently he already had been a lieutenant in 1665. Fireships were often manned by the most desperate elements in society; the humility of his origins might explain the fact they were never mentioned.

At St. James's Day Battle, having spent another fireship and returning with his crew in sloops, Van Brakel saved the Gelderland, the flagship of Lieutenant-Admiral Willem Joseph van Ghent from an attack by an English fireship. Because of the courage shown, Van Brakel was promoted to captain of a regular ship on 22 September 1666, a rare accomplishment for a fireship commander. In 1667, while in command of the frigate Vrede, he participating in the raid on the Medway and was given the task of towing the captured English flagship HMS Royal Charles out of the Medway river. That same year Van Brakel was promoted full captain on 17 December.

In 1672, at the battle of Solebay—the first battle of the Third Anglo-Dutch War—Van Brakel served as captain of Groot Hollandia, and played a major part in the burning of HMS Royal James.

In 1673, he continued to fight with distinction at the battle of Schooneveld and the battle of the Texel, as captain of Voorzichtigheid.

On 5 April 1684, Van Brakel was promoted to rear admiral of the Admiralty of Amsterdam.

Four years later, as a temporary vice admiral—from October 1688 until January 1689—he was part of the invasion fleet that brought William of Orange's army to England during the Glorious Revolution.

From 1688 onwards, Van Brakel served on the amalgamated Anglo-Dutch fleet until he was killed in the battle of Beachy Head in 1690.

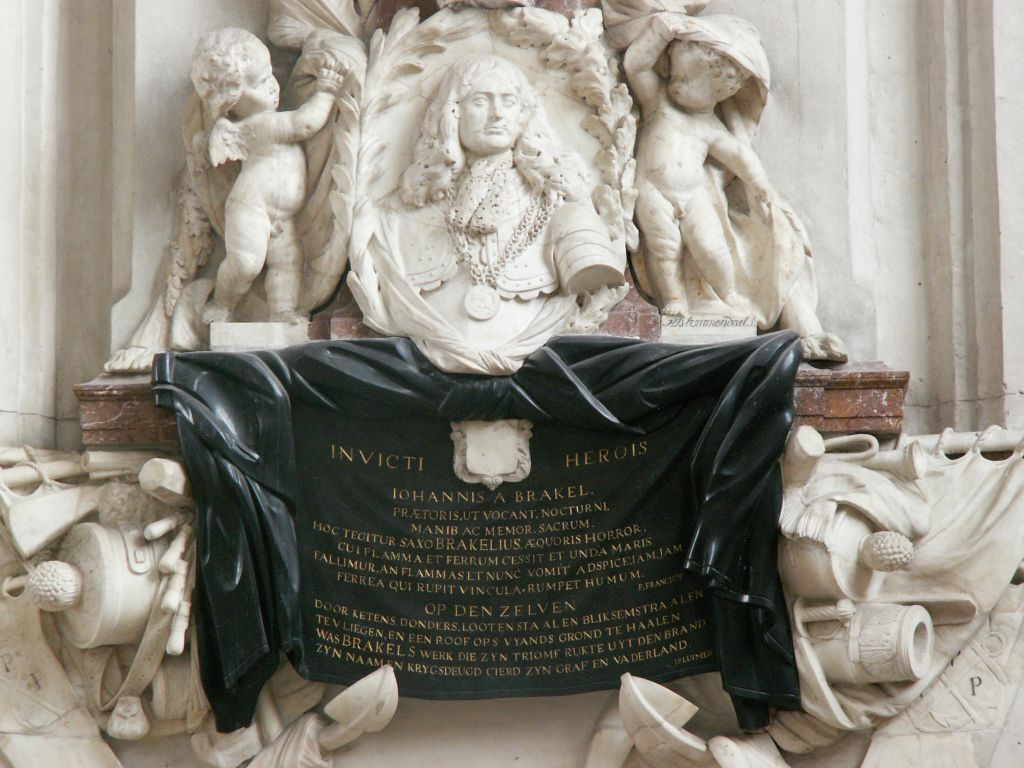
Van Brakel's grave memorial in St. Lawrence Church, Rotterdam

== Legacy ==
His grave memorial is located in St. Lawrence Church in Rotterdam.

He is the namesake of:

- HNLMS Jan van Brakel (1936), a former Dutch Minelaying vessel.
- HNLMS Jan van Brakel (1983), a former Dutch Kortenaer class frigate.
