= Damen Schelde Naval Shipbuilding =

Dutch military shipyard

Damen Naval
- Type: Private
- Industry: Defence, Shipbuilding
- Founded: 1875; 151 years ago in Vlissingen
- Founder: Arie Smit
- Headquarters: Vlissingen, Netherlands
- Area served: worldwide
- Products: Warships and Patrol boats
- Website: www.damen.com

Damen Naval is a Dutch shipyard, and a continuation of the Koninklijke Maatschappij De Schelde, responsible for a number of ships used by the Royal Netherlands Navy. It is owned by the Damen Group. Damen Naval is situated in Vlissingen.

== History ==
The company was founded on 8 October 1875 as the NV Koninklijke Maatschappij De Schelde (KMS) after shipbuilder Arie Smit had taken over the Marine Etablissement, the wharf owned by the Dutch navy. Besides shipbuilding and repair, the company also builds machines, engines, steam turbines, airplanes, and light-metal products. Koninklijk is a royal title granted by the Dutch Crown.

In 1965 the company merged with the NV Rotterdamsche Droogdok Maatschappij (RDM) and the NV Motorenfabriek Thomassen of De Steeg, which resulted in the founding, on 4 March 1966, of the Rijn-Schelde Machinefabrieken en Scheepswerven NV (RSMS). Pressured by the Dutch government the Verolme Verenigde Scheepswerven NV was added, and this was the start of Rijn-Schelde-Verolme Machinefabrieken en Scheepswerven NV (RSV). RSV went under and split up, and its shares were taken over by the government and the province of Zeeland. Its name was changed to Koninklijke Schelde Groep BV (KSG) in 1991. In 2000 the government and the province sold their shares to the Damen Group of Gorinchem, and KSG became the company's branch charged with building larger ships for naval and coastguard duty.

== Aircraft projects ==
- De Schelde Scheldemusch
- De Schelde S.20
- De Schelde S.21

== Warships built ==
Coastal defence ships
Name	Class	Customer	Launched	Fate	Note
Evertsen	Evertsen class	Royal Netherlands Navy	29 September 1894	Decommissioned in 1913	

Corvettes
Name	Class	Customer	Launched	Fate	Note
Diponegoro	Diponegoro class	Indonesian Navy	September 2006	In active service	
Sultan Hasanuddin	Diponegoro class	Indonesian Navy	September 2006	In active service	
Sultan Iskandar Muda	Diponegoro class	Indonesian Navy	May 2006	In active service	
Frans Kaisiepo	Diponegoro class	Indonesian Navy	June 2008	In active service	

Cruisers
Name	Class	Customer	Launched	Fate	Note
Zeeland	Holland class	Royal Netherlands Navy	20 March 1897	Decommissioned in 1924	
Noordbrabant	Holland class	Royal Netherlands Navy	1 March 1900	Scuttled in 1940	After her decommissioning in 1920 the ship was rebuilt as an accommodation ship.
Java	Java class	Royal Netherlands Navy	6 August 1921	Sunk on 27 February 1942	Got hit by a Long Lance torpedo during the Battle of the Java Sea. The torpedo was fired from the Japanese cruiser Nachi.

Destroyers
Name	Class	Customer	Launched	Fate	Note
Wolf	Wolf class	Royal Netherlands Navy	1910	Decommissioned in 1924	
Fret	Wolf class	Royal Netherlands Navy	1910	Decommissioned in 1922	
Bulhond	Wolf class	Royal Netherlands Navy	1911	Decommissioned in 1927	
Jakhals	Wolf class	Royal Netherlands Navy	1912	Decommissioned in 1928	
Lynx	Wolf class	Royal Netherlands Navy	1912	Decommissioned in 1928	
Hermelijn	Wolf class	Royal Netherlands Navy	1913	Decommissioned in 1925	
Van Ghent	Admiralen class	Royal Netherlands Navy	23 October 1926	Scuttled on 15 February 1942	Scuttled by the Dutch destroyer Banckert.
Philips van Almonde	Gerard Callenburgh class	Royal Netherlands Navy	-	not completed due to WWII	Demolished on the slipway on 17 May 1940. Wreck scrapped by the Germans.
Isaac Sweers	Gerard Callenburgh class	Royal Netherlands Navy	16 March 1940	Sunk on 13 November 1942	Hit by two torpedoes from the German submarine U-431
Zeeland	Holland class	Royal Netherlands Navy	27 June 1953	Decommissioned in 1979	
Noord-Brabant	Holland class	Royal Netherlands Navy	28 November 1953	Decommissioned in 1974	She was decommissioned after being severely damaged in a collision.
Limburg	Friesland class	Royal Netherlands Navy	5 September 1955	Sold to the Peruvian Navy in 1980	In the Peruvian Navy known as BAP Capitan Quiñones
Utrecht	Friesland class	Royal Netherlands Navy	2 June 1956	Sold to the Peruvian Navy in 1980	In the Peruvian Navy known as BAP Castilla

Frigates
Name	Class	Customer	Launched	Fate	Note
Van Galen	Van Speijk class	Royal Netherlands Navy	19 June 1965	Sold to Indonesia in 1987	Known in the Indonesian Navy as KRI Yos Sudarso.
Van Nes	Van Speijk class	Royal Netherlands Navy	26 March 1966	Sold to Indonesia in 1986	Known in the Indonesian Navy as KRI Oswald Siahaan.
Evertsen	Van Speijk class	Royal Netherlands Navy	18 June 1966	Sold to Indonesia in 1989	Known in the Indonesian Navy as KRI Abdul Halim Perdanakusuma.
Tromp	Tromp class	Royal Netherlands Navy	4 June 1973	Decommissioned in 1999	
De Ruyter	Tromp class	Royal Netherlands Navy	9 March 1974	Decommissioned in 2001	Her bridge, radar, and gun have been preserved by the Dutch Navy Museum in Den Helder, North Holland.
Kortenaer	Kortenaer class	Royal Netherlands Navy	18 December 1976	Decommissioned in 1997	Sold to the Hellenic Navy as Kountouriotes (Κουντουριώτης).
Callenburgh	Kortenaer class	Royal Netherlands Navy	26 March 1977	Decommissioned in 1994	Sold to the Hellenic Navy as Adrias (Αδρίας).
Van Kinsbergen	Kortenaer class	Royal Netherlands Navy	16 April 1977	Decommissioned in 1995	Sold to the Hellenic Navy as Navarinon (Ναυαρίνον).
Banckert	Kortenaer class	Royal Netherlands Navy	30 September 1978	Decommissioned in 1993	Sold to the Hellenic Navy as Aegaeon (Αιγαίον).
Piet Hein	Kortenaer class	Royal Netherlands Navy	3 June 1978	Decommissioned in 1998	Sold to the United Arab Emirates as Al Emirat.
Abraham Crijnssen	Kortenaer class	Royal Netherlands Navy	16 May 1981	Decommissioned in 1997	Sold to the United Arab Emirates as Abu Dhabi.
Jan van Brakel	Kortenaer class	Royal Netherlands Navy	16 May 1981	Decommissioned in 2001	Sold to the Hellenic Navy as Kanaris (Κανάρης).
Pieter Florisz	Kortenaer class	Royal Netherlands Navy	8 May 1982	Decommissioned in 2001	Sold to the Hellenic Navy as Bouboulina (Μπουμπουλίνα). Decommissioned in 2013.
Jacob van Heemskerck	Jacob van Heemskerck class	Royal Netherlands Navy	5 November 1983	Sold to Chile in 2005	Known in the Chilean Navy as Almirante Latorre (named after Juan José Latorre). The frigate is in active service.
Witte de With	Jacob van Heemskerck class	Royal Netherlands Navy	25 August 1984	Sold to Chile in 2005	Known in the Chilean Navy as Capitán Prat (named after Arturo Prat). The frigate is in active service.
Karel Doorman	Karel Doorman class	Royal Netherlands Navy	20 April 1988	Decommissioned in 2006	Sold to Belgium as Leopold I in 2005.
Willem van der Zaan	Karel Doorman class	Royal Netherlands Navy	21 January 1989	Decommissioned in 2006	Sold to Belgium as Louise-Marie in 2005.
Tjerk Hiddes	Karel Doorman class	Royal Netherlands Navy	9 December 1989	Decommissioned on 3 February 2006	Sold to Chilean Navy in 2007, renamed as Almirante Riveros.
Van Amstel	Karel Doorman class	Royal Netherlands Navy	19 May 1990	In active service	
Abraham van der Hulst	Karel Doorman class	Royal Netherlands Navy	7 September 1991	Decommissioned in 2004	Sold to Chilean Navy in 2006, renamed as Almirante Blanco Encalada.
Van Nes	Karel Doorman class	Royal Netherlands Navy	16 May 1992	Decommissioned on 20 December 2007	Sold to Portuguese Navy in 2006, renamed as Bartolomeu Dias.
Van Galen	Karel Doorman class	Royal Netherlands Navy	21 November 1992	Decommissioned in 2009	Sold to Portuguese Navy in 2006, renamed as D. Francisco de Almeida.
Van Speijk	Karel Doorman class	Royal Netherlands Navy	26 March 1994	In active service	
De Zeven Provinciën	De Zeven Provinciën class	Royal Netherlands Navy	8 April 2000	In active service	
Tromp	De Zeven Provinciën class	Royal Netherlands Navy	7 April 2001	In active service	
De Ruyter	De Zeven Provinciën class	Royal Netherlands Navy	13 April 2002	In active service	
Evertsen	De Zeven Provinciën class	Royal Netherlands Navy	19 April 2003	In active service	
Tarik Ben Ziyad	Sigma class	Royal Moroccan Navy	12 July 2010	In active service	Sigma 10513 version.
Sultan Moulay Ismail	Sigma class	Royal Moroccan Navy	4 February 2011	In active service	Sigma 9813 version.
Allal Ben Abdellah	Sigma class	Royal Moroccan Navy	October 2011	In active service	Sigma 9813 version.
Raden Eddy Martadinata	Martadinata class	Indonesian Navy	18 January 2016	In active service	Two modules of this frigate were built at Damen Schelde Naval Shipbuilding, while the remaining four were built at PT PAL.
I Gusti Ngurah Rai	Martadinata class	Indonesian Navy	29 September 2016	In active service	Two modules of this frigate were built at Damen Schelde Naval Shipbuilding, while the remaining four were built at PT PAL.
Benito Juárez	Reformador class	Mexican Navy	6 February 2020	In active service	Two modules of this frigate were built at Damen Schelde Naval Shipbuilding, while the remaining four were built at ASTIMAR 20

Gunboats
Name	Class	Customer	Launched	Fate	Note
Johan Maurits van Nassau	Johan Maurits van Nassau class	Royal Netherlands Navy	20 August 1932	Sunk on 14 May 1940	Sunk when attacked by multiple aircraft of Germany.

Joint support ship
Name	Class	Customer	Launched	Fate	Note
Karel Doorman	Karel Doorman-class JSS	Royal Netherlands Navy	17 October 2012	In active service	This ship was built partly in the Damen Shipyards Galați. Furthermore, it is shared with the German Navy.

Landing platform dock
Name	Class	Customer	Launched	Fate	Note
Rotterdam	Rotterdam class	Royal Netherlands Navy	February 1997	In active service	The ship was the result of a joint project between the Netherlands and Spain, which resulted in the Enforcer design.
Johan de Witt	Rotterdam class	Royal Netherlands Navy	13 May 2006	In active service	Improved design of HNLMS Rotterdam (L800), which was designed in conjunction between the Netherlands and Spain.

Offshore patrol vessel
Name	Class	Customer	Launched	Fate	Note
Holland	Holland class	Royal Netherlands Navy	2 February 2010	in active service	
Zeeland	Holland class	Royal Netherlands Navy	20 November 2010	in active service	
Friesland	Holland class	Royal Netherlands Navy	4 November 2010	in active service	Built at Damen Shipyards Galați and fitting out by Damen Schelde Naval Shipbuilding.
Groningen	Holland class	Royal Netherlands Navy	21 April 2011	in active service	Built at Damen Shipyards Galați and fitting out by Damen Schelde Naval Shipbuilding.

Submarines
Name	Class	Customer	Launched	Fate	Note
O 1	O 1 class	Royal Netherlands Navy	8 July 1905	Decommissioned in 1920	A model of O 1 is in the Nederlands Scheepvaartmuseum.
O 2	O 2 class	Royal Netherlands Navy	30 January 1911	Decommissioned in 1930	In the early 1930s the ship served as a training vessel.
O 3	O 2 class	Royal Netherlands Navy	30 July 1912	Decommissioned in 1932	
O 4	O 2 class	Royal Netherlands Navy	5 August 1913	Decommissioned in 1935	
O 5	O 2 class	Royal Netherlands Navy	2 October 1913	Decommissioned in 1935	
O 6	O 6 class	Royal Netherlands Navy	10 June 1915 or 15 July 1916	Decommissioned in November 1936	
O 9	O 9 class	Royal Netherlands Navy	7 April 1925	Decommissioned on 1 December 1944	In October 1946 she was sold for scrapping.
O 12	O 12 class	Royal Netherlands Navy	8 November 1930	Demolished on 22 January 1954.	Served during Germany's occupation of the Netherlands as U-D2 in the Kriegsmarine.
O 13	O 12 class	Royal Netherlands Navy	18 April 1931	Lost while patrolling in 1940	The remains of the submarine still has not been found.
O 14	O 12 class	Royal Netherlands Navy	3 October 1931	Decommissioned on 26 June 1943	She was decommission in 1943 because of a lack of parts to fix trouble with the diesel engines.
O 16	O 16 class	Royal Netherlands Navy	27 January 1936	Sunk by mine on 15 December 1941	Raised and scrapped in October 2013.
Orzeł	Orzeł class	Polish Navy	15 January 1938	Decommissioned on 11 June 1940	Went missing during WWII.
O 21	O 21 class	Royal Netherlands Navy	21 October 1939	Decommissioned on 2 November 1957	Sold for scrap on 24 January 1958.
O 22	O 21 class	Royal Netherlands Navy	20 January 1940	Lost during patrol in 1940	Her wreck was discovered in 1993 by a ship of the Norwegian Petroleum Directorate.
K I	K I class	Royal Netherlands Navy	20 May 1913	Decommissioned in 1928	
K III	K III class	Royal Netherlands Navy	12 August 1919	Decommissioned in 1934	
K IV	K III class	Royal Netherlands Navy	2 July 1920	Decommissioned in 1936	
K VIII	K VIII class	Royal Netherlands Navy	28 March 1922	Decommissioned on 18 May 1942	K VIII's batteries were salvaged to replace those in K IX.
K IX	K VIII class	Royal Netherlands Navy	23 December 1922	Decommissioned on 25 July 1942	Commissioned into the Royal Australian Navy as HMAS K9 on 22 June 1943.
K X	K VIII class	Royal Netherlands Navy	2 May 1923	Scuttled on 2 March 1942	She was scrapped at Surabaya in 1946.

Submarine support ships
Name	Class	Customer	Launched	Fate	Note
Mercuur	Mercuur class	Royal Netherlands Navy	16 October 1987	in active service	Mercuur underwent maintenance between 2014 and 2016. During this maintenance several components were upgraded.

Replenishment ships
Name	Class	Customer	Launched	Fate	Note
Amsterdam	Amsterdam class	Royal Netherlands Navy	11 September 1992	Decommissioned on 4 December 2014	Sold to Peruvian Navy and is now known as BAP Tacna.

== See also ==
- Damen Group
- Ships of the Royal Netherlands Navy
- Royal Netherlands Navy

== Bibliography ==
- G.A. de Kok, De Koninklijke Weg: Honderd jaar geschiedenis Koninklijke Maatschappij De Schelde te Vlissingen 1875–1975, Vlissingen, 1975. ISBN 90-70027-50-X.
- Piet Quite, Koninklijke Mij. 'De Schelde': 125 jaar scheepsbouw in Vlissingen, Alkmaar, 1999. ISBN 90-6013-095-2.
- Jeroen Verhoog, Jessica van der Hulst, Luctor et Emergo: 125 Jaar Koninklijke Schelde 1875–2000, Vlissingen, 2001.
- Harm J. Hazewinkel, Vliegtuigbouw in Fokkers schaduw, Sassenheim, 1988. ISBN 90-366-0348-X.
- B. van der Klaauw, Armand van Ishoven, Peter van der Gaag, De geschiedenis van de Nederlandse en Belgische Luchtvaart (series De geschiedenis van de luchtvaart), Lekturama, 1982.
- Theo Wesselink, Thijs Postma, De Nederlandse vliegtuigen, Haarlem, 1982. ISBN 90-228-3792-0.
- Hugo Hooftman, Nederlandse Vliegtuig Encyclopedie Scheldemusch en Scheldemeeuw, Bennekom: Cockpit, 1978.
