= Wolf-class destroyer =

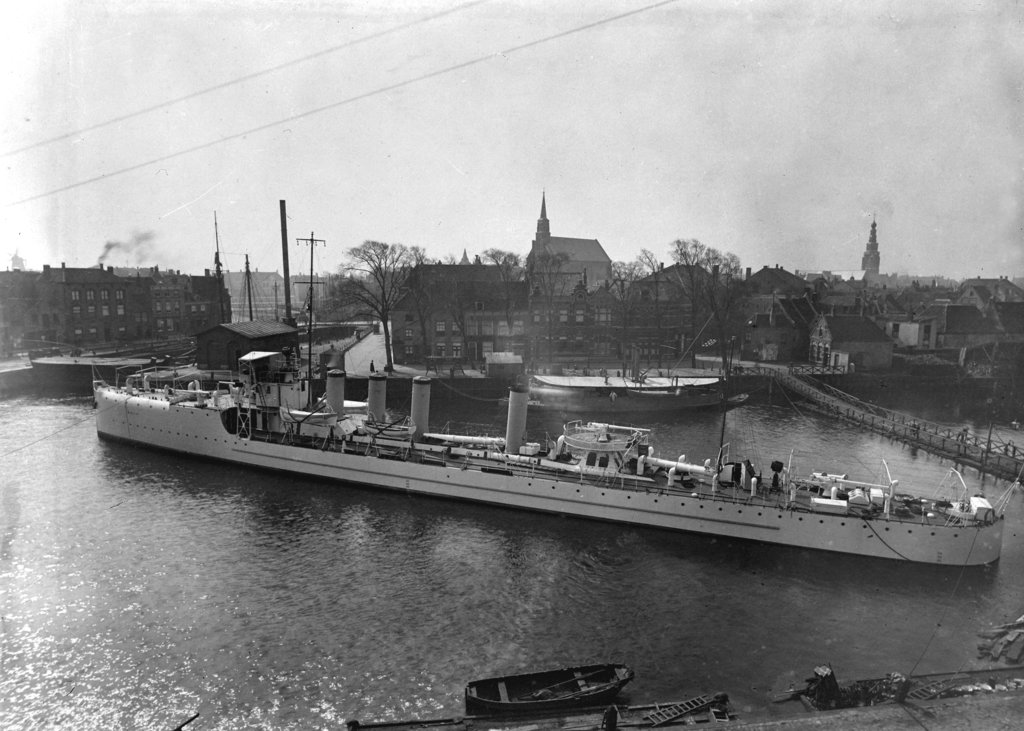
- HNLMS Wolf in Vlissingen c. 1912

Class overview
- Name: Wolf-class destroyer
- Builders: Koninklijke Maatschappij de Schelde, Flushing (6); Feijenoord, Schiedam (2)
- Operators: Royal Netherlands Navy
- Succeeded by: Admiralen class
- Built: 1910–1913
- In commission: 1911–1928
- Completed: 8
- Retired: 8

General characteristics
- Type: Destroyer
- Displacement: 510 t (500 long tons)
- Length: 70.5 m (231 ft 4 in) o.a.
- Beam: 6.6 m (21 ft 8 in)
- Draught: 2.8 m (9 ft 2 in)
- Installed power: 4 × Yarrow type boilers; 8,500 hp (6,300 kW)
- Propulsion: 2 × Krupp-Germania steam turbines; 2 × shafts
- Speed: 30 knots (56 km/h; 35 mph)
- Range: 2,360 nmi (4,370 km; 2,720 mi) at 8 kn (15 km/h; 9.2 mph); 670 nmi (1,240 km; 770 mi) at 20 kn (37 km/h; 23 mph)
- Complement: 83
- Armament: 4 × single 75 mm (3 in)/52-calibre guns; 4 × 7.92 mm (0.31 in)/80-calibre machine guns; 2 × single 450 mm (18 in) torpedo tubes

The Wolf- or Fret-class destroyers, also known as the Roofdier class, lit. "predator", (Note: From Dutch: roof, "robbery" and dier, "animal". See the Wiktionary article for more information.) were a class of eight destroyers that were built between 1910 and 1913 for the Royal Netherlands Navy to serve in the Dutch East Indies. They were the first Dutch destroyers built after a British design. The first six ships were built by Koninklijke Schelde Groep De Schelde shipyards in Vlissingen, and the last two by Fijenoord in Rotterdam. The ships were replaced at the end of the 1920s by the Admiralen class.

== Design ==
The ships displaced 510 tonnes (502 long tons) and measured 70.4 metres (231 ft 0 in) in length overall, 6.6 m (21 ft 8 in) in breadth, with a 2 m (6 ft 7 in) draught. They were powered by four Yarrow boilers installed creating steam that produced 8,500 horsepower (6,300 kW). They had two Krupp-Germania steam turbines that drove two shafts. The first four ships, Wolf, Fret, Bulhond, and Jakhals, each carried 120 t (120 long tons; 130 short tons) of coal, the last four, Lynx, Hermelijin, Vos, and Panter, carried an additional 12.5 t (12.3 long tons; 13.8 short tons) of fuel oil in addition to the 120 t of coal. This gave the last four ships an additional 340 nautical miles (630 km; 390 mi) of endurance.

The ships were armed with four 75-millimetre (3 in)/52-calibre guns, four 7.92 mm (0.31 in)/80-calibre machine guns, and two 450 mm (18 in) torpedo tubes.

== Ships ==
Name	Laid down	Launched	Completed	Builder	Fate
Wolf	1909	17 September 1910	1911	Koninklijke Maatschappij de Schelde, Flushing	Stricken 1924
Fret	1909	15 October 1910	1911	Koninklijke Maatschappij de Schelde, Flushing	Stricken 1922
Bulhond	1910	20 December 1911	August 1912	Koninklijke Maatschappij de Schelde, Flushing	Stricken 1927
Jakhals	1910	20 January 1912	July 1912	Koninklijke Maatschappij de Schelde, Flushing	Stricken 1928
Hermelijn	1911	22 February 1913	July 1913	Koninklijke Maatschappij de Schelde, Flushing	Stricken 1925
Lynx	1911	24 December 1912	July 1913	Koninklijke Maatschappij de Schelde, Flushing	Stricken 1928
Vos	1912	28 June 1913	February 1914	Feijenoord, Schiedam	Stricken 1928
Panter	1912	9 September 1913	March 1914	Feijenoord, Schiedam	Stricken 1934

They are named after mammals of the order Carnivora (Roofdieren is a synonym for carnivore in Dutch). Their names in English, in the sequence listed, mean: wolf, ferret, bulldog, jackal, ermine, lynx, fox and panther.

== See also ==
- List of destroyers of the Netherlands
