= HDMS Flora =

The following ships of the Royal Danish Navy have borne the name HDMS Flora:

- HDMS Flora (1826), a corvette in service 1826–1856
- HDMS Flora (1919) a submarine launched in 1920 and scrapped in 1952
- HDMS Flora (F346) a Triton-class corvette launched in 1955 and decommissioned in 1978
