= Arie Smit (shipbuilder) =

Arie Smit (businessman)
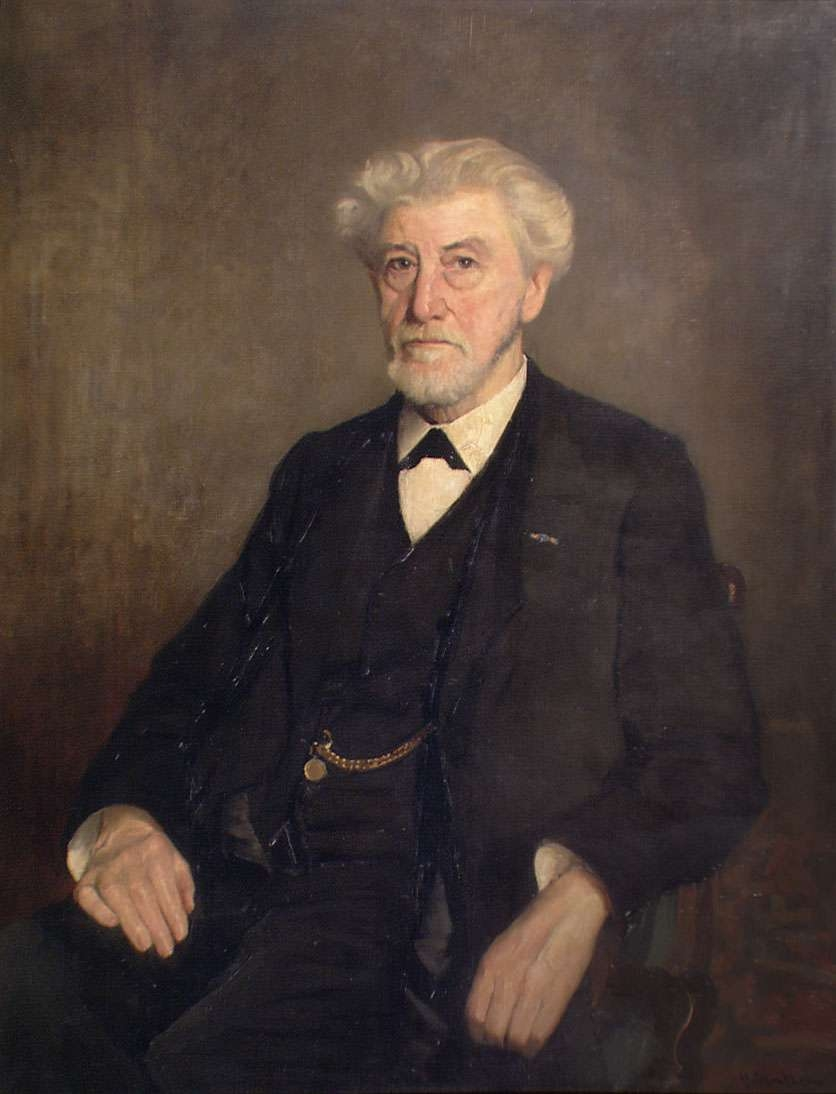
- Arie Smit painting in Zeeuws Maritiem muZEEum
- Born: May 1, 1845; Ridderkerk
- Died: May 10, 1935 (aged 90) 's-Gravenhage
- Occupations: Businessman, shipbuilder
- Known for: Founding Shipyard De Schelde (KMS)

Arie Smit (1 May 1845 – 10 May 1935) was a Dutch shipbuilder and politician.

== Early life and education ==
Arie Smit was part of the large and well-known Smit family of shipbuilders. He was a grandson of Fop Smit, who founded the shipyard L. Smit en Zoon. After primary school, Arie went to the boarding school Opstelten in Rhenen for four years. In 1860, the principal of the school advised his father to let Arie go to university, because he had scientific talent.

Arie's father Jan Smit had a shipyard in Slikkerveer. He called Arie home, and let him work on this shipyard while educating him in shipbuilding and business. On the Slikkerveer shipyard Arie designed the famous wooden clipper frigates Noach II till Noach VI. Some of these sailed from the Netherlands to Java in 65 days. Arie also had a part in the design of the even bigger De Voorlichter and De Liberaal.

Arie would become an enthusiastic sailor. He built several boats himself and even entered international events. Arie was also an avid hunter.

== In business ==
Jan Smit did not want all of his five sons on his own shipyard. Arie was therefore sent away to manage one of the family's companies, the Gasworks of Sliedrecht. Arie soon found that this was a hopeless affair, as the works were regularly flooded and the tubing could not handle frost, leading to huge gas losses.

Arie was involved in founding the Gorinchemse Bank. This had to do with Gorinchem's former mayor Cornelis van Andel being married to Arie's sister Pauline Jeanette. The Smit family were partners in the partnership Maatschap de Merode, which held a license for Salmon fishing near Kralingseveer. This was done with huge nets and was therefore technologically challenging, but also brought in huge profits.

In 1873 Arie visited Vlissingen to advise on a ship that was lying in Vlissingen Navy Drydock. While there, Arie observed the site of the former Navy shipyard Rijkswerf Vlissingen, part of Vlissingen Naval Base and abandoned in 1868. Arie then made plans for a small auxiliary shipyard there. However, the abandonement of the navy shipyard had ruined Vlissingen. Harbor works and the opening of the Roosendaal–Vlissingen railway in 1873 did not remedy this situation. Therefore, B.J. Tideman of Delft University and the Dutch navy got government orders to found a big shipyard and machine factory in Vlissingen. When Tideman learned of Arie's plans, he jumped at the opportunity, and the king went as far to personally ask Arie to found a shipyard in Vlissingen.

In 1875 Shipyard De Schelde was founded. Arie was very much involved in managing De Schelde, but did this as president of the supervisory board, not as chief executive. He continued as president till just before his 80th birthday. In Vlissingen Arie would also found a beer brewery.

== Politics ==
The time in Vlissingen started Arie's political career. He became mayor of Vlissingen in July 1879 and remained so till August 1888. From 1882 to 1886 Arie was in the Provincial Council of Zeeland. In 1886 the Liberal Arie was elected to the national House of Representatives by a majority of only 11 votes.

In the House Arie spoke primarily about technical and naval affairs, also about the main rivers. He even advised about the Dry dock for Tanjung Priok. The only notable affair of Arie in the house came during his first term, when he had a confrontation with W.M. Visser, director of Fijenoord shipyard. Visser had published a brochure "Proeve van een ontwerp voor een strijder onzer Zeemacht", in which he berated Arie for doing a bad job as representative because he lacked oratory skills and did not check the reports of his speeches. In December 1887 Arie then gave a speech that heavily criticized the way that successive navy ministers had protected the state shipyard Rijkswerf Amsterdam. Arie also criticized the construction of the Atjeh-class cruisers, calling them already obsolete when the 3rd or 4th of the class was laid down. However, what created the affair was a remark about the design published by Visser / Fijenoord shipyard. The heated debate that followed was in essence about Fijenoord accusing De Schelde of being a foreign company, and De Schelde complaining about Fijenoord getting subsidized by government orders. Arie defended his opinion in the brochure: Open brief aan den Heer W.M. Visser schrijver van de brochure Scheepsbouw voor 's lands vloot. Later in 1888 Arie was not re-elected by his Zeeland district.

After not getting re-elected to the House of Representatives in 1888, Arie moved to Rotterdam. In 1891 the Liberal party then put him on the list for Ridderkerk, home to the Smit clan. Now Arie was again elected, and continued in the House of Representatives till 1897.

After Arie left the House of Representatives in 1897, he went to live in Den Haag. Here he was a member of the municipal council from 1902 to 1908. He was involved with the municipal gas works and power station; the harbor of Scheveningen, and the city abattoir. He had to stop this work because of increased hearing loss. In 1908 Arie's career in society had practically ended.

== Legacy ==
In 2009 a search and rescue boat called Arie Smit was taken in use by the beach guards of Vlissingen municipality.

== Sources ==
- Van Sandick, R.A. (1925), "Arie Smit", De Ingenieur (17), Koninklijk Instituut van Ingenieurs
- Handelingen, Tweede Kamer der Staten-Generaal, 1888
- Dirkzwager, J.M. (1985), "Arie Smit", De Ingenieur (17), Huygens Instituut
- Jobse, Laurens (5 June 2009). "Nieuwe reddingsboot in gebruik genomen". HVZeeland.
