= HNLMS O 7 =

Military submarine

History

Netherlands
- Name: O 7
- Builder: Maatschappij Fijenoord, Rotterdam
- Laid down: 12 May 1914
- Launched: 22 July 1916
- Commissioned: 23 December 1916
- Decommissioned: 21 December 1939
- Fate: Scrapped

General characteristics
- Class & type: Unique submarine
- Displacement: 178.6 tons; 209.3 tons
- Length: 34.24 m (112 ft 4 in)
- Beam: 3.9 m (12 ft 10 in)
- Draught: 2.88 m (9 ft 5 in)
- Propulsion: 1 × 350 bhp (261 kW) diesel engine; 1 × 210 bhp (157 kW) electric motor
- Speed: 11.5 kn (21.3 km/h; 13.2 mph) surfaced; 8.5 kn (15.7 km/h; 9.8 mph) submerged
- Range: 750 nmi (1,390 km; 860 mi) at 10 kn (19 km/h; 12 mph) on the surface; 42 nmi (78 km; 48 mi) at 7 kn (13 km/h; 8.1 mph) submerged
- Complement: 15
- Armament: 2 × 18 inch bow torpedo tubes; 1 × 18 inch stern torpedo tube

HNLMS O 7 was a unique patrol submarine of the Royal Netherlands Navy for use in the home waters of Europe. The ship was built by the Maatschappij Fijenoord shipyard in Rotterdam. The submarines diving depth was 40 metres. O 6 was very similar to the O 7 and they are sometimes regarded as one class.

== Service history ==
The submarine was ordered on 8 May 1913. On 12 May 1914 the O 7 was laid down in Rotterdam at the shipyard of Maatschappij Fijenoord. The O 7's launching took place on 22 July 1916 and on 23 December 1916 the ship was commissioned into the Royal Netherlands Navy.

On the 18 May 1927 the O 7 and Swedish steamer Scania collided off the coast of Texel.

From 1935 onwards the ship was used only as a training vessel until 21 December 1939, when the O 7 was decommissioned.

=== World War II ===
In 1940 when the Germans invaded the Netherlands, the O 7 was captured intact at her moorings. It was considered by the Germans to be far too obsolete for it to be of any use in the war effort and thus the boat went mostly ignored. The O 7 sank on 2 May 1944 in Den Helder while it was moored there, she sank because of water leaking into the ship due to negligence. After the war she was raised and finally scrapped.
