= HNLMS O 6 =

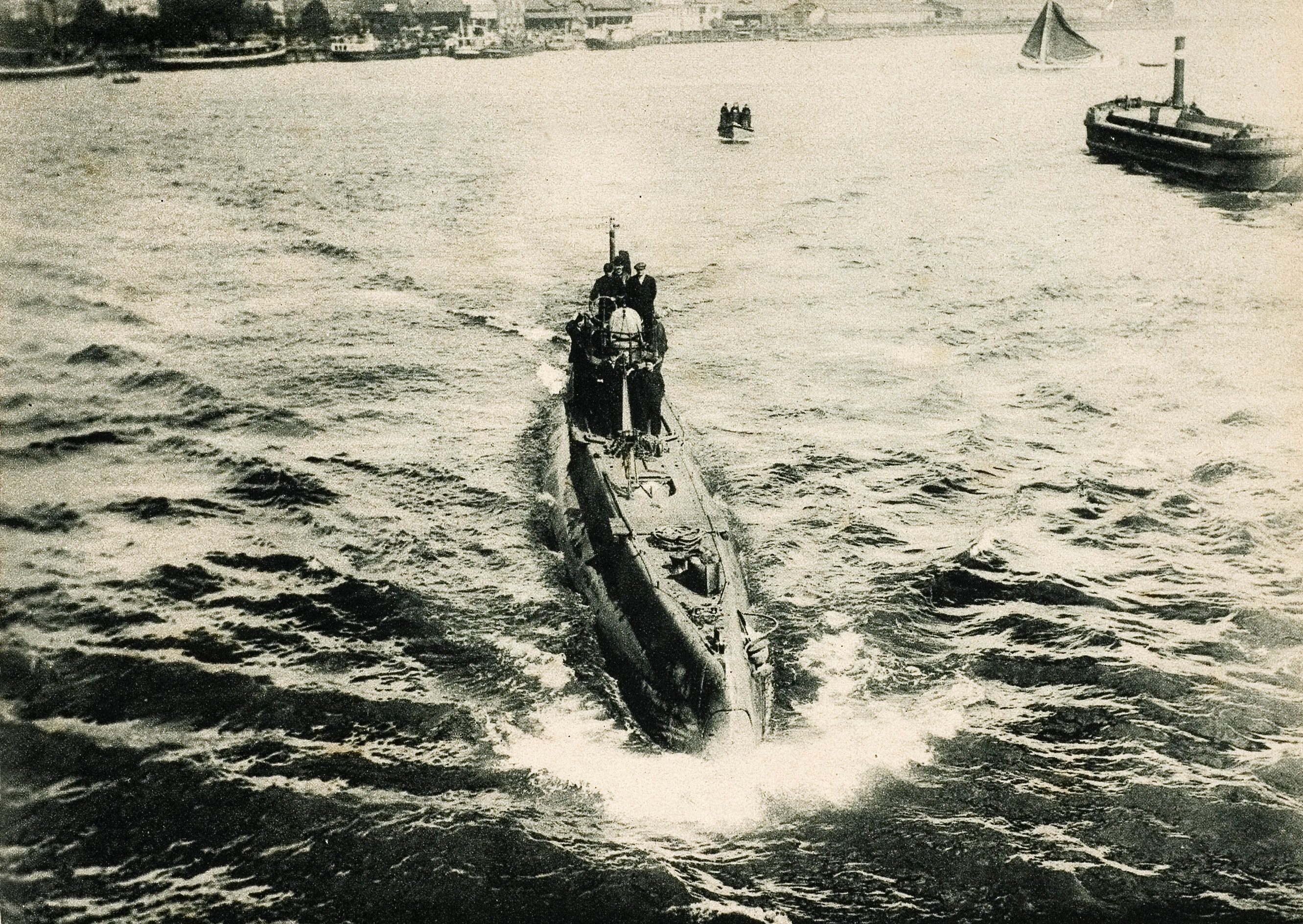
- O 6

History
- Name: O 6
- Builder: De Schelde, Flushing
- Laid down: 2 or 21 May 1914
- Launched: 10 June 1915
- Commissioned: 5 December 1916
- Decommissioned: November 1936
- Fate: Decommissioned 1936

General characteristics
- Class & type: Unique submarine
- Displacement: 192 tons; 233 tons
- Length: 35.69 m (117 ft 1 in)
- Beam: 4.13 m (13 ft 7 in)
- Draught: 3.05 m (10 ft 0 in)
- Propulsion: 1 × 375 bhp (280 kW) diesel engine; 1 × 210 bhp (157 kW) electric motor
- Speed: 12 kn (22 km/h; 14 mph) surfaced; 8.5 kn (15.7 km/h; 9.8 mph) submerged
- Range: 750 nmi (1,390 km; 860 mi) at 10 kn (19 km/h; 12 mph) on the surface; 42 nmi (78 km; 48 mi) at 7 kn (13 km/h; 8.1 mph) submerged
- Complement: 15
- Armament: 2 × 18 inch bow torpedo tubes; 1 × 18 inch stern torpedo tube

O 6 was a unique patrol submarine of the Royal Netherlands Navy for European home waters. The ship was built by De Schelde shipyard in Flushing. The submarines diving depth was 40 metres. O 7 was very similar to the O 6 and they are sometimes regarded as one class.

== Service history ==
The submarine was ordered on 8 May 1913 and in May 1914 the O 6 was laid down in Flushing at the shipyard of De Schelde. The launch took place on 10 June 1915.

On 5 December 1916 the ship was commissioned in the navy. During World War I the ship was based in Den Helder.

On 7 Jul 1920 the ship left the port of Flushing for a trip to Norway the ports of Odda, Bergen, Gudvangen among others are visited. The ship returned to Flushing in June 1920.

In June 1923 the O 6 was used by Professor F.A. Vening Meinesz for gravity measurements in the North Sea. In November 1936 O 6 was decommissioned.
