= HNLMS K I =

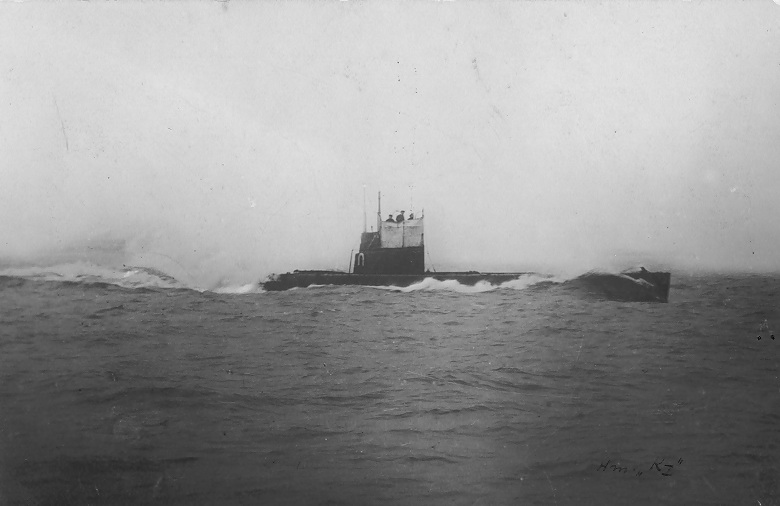
- K I

History

Netherlands
- Name: K I
- Builder: Koninklijke Maatschappij De Schelde, Vlissingen, the Netherlands
- Cost: 942.875 Dutch Guilders
- Yard number: 142
- Laid down: 16 September 1911
- Launched: 20 May 1913
- Commissioned: 12 July 1914
- Decommissioned: 1928
- Fate: Decommissioned 1928

General characteristics
- Class & type: K I
- Type: Unique patrol submarine
- Displacement: 333 tons surfaced; 385.9 tons submerged
- Length: 48.65 m (159 ft 7 in)
- Beam: 4.69 m (15 ft 5 in)
- Draught: 3.22 m (10 ft 7 in)
- Propulsion: 2 × 900 bhp (671 kW) diesel engines; 2 × 157 bhp (117 kW) electric motors
- Speed: 17 kn (31 km/h; 20 mph) surfaced; 10.5 kn (19.4 km/h; 12.1 mph) submerged
- Range: 3,500 nmi (6,500 km; 4,000 mi) at 11 kn (20 km/h; 13 mph) on the surface; 30 nmi (56 km; 35 mi) at 8 kn (15 km/h; 9.2 mph) submerged
- Test depth: 40 meters
- Complement: 17
- Armament: 2 × 18 inch bow torpedo tubes; 1 × 18 inch stern torpedo tube; 9 torpedoes

K I was a unique patrol submarine of the Royal Netherlands Navy. The ship was built by Koninklijke Maatschappij De Schelde shipyard in Vlissingen. The boat had a diving depth of 40 metres (130 ft). She was the first submarine in Southeast Asia.

== Background ==
The K I was the first Dutch submarine that was specially designed to serve in the Dutch East Indies and its tropical weather. To emphasize that the boat was intended for service in the Dutch colony, it was given a K in its name. The K refers to the Dutch word koloniaal or koloniën, which translates to colonial. Since K I would serve in the Dutch East Indies, it was the Dutch Ministry of Colonies who paid for the boat.

=== Construction ===
In December 1910 construction of the boat was approved. A month later, in January 1911, it was reported that the Dutch Ministry of Colonies and the Dutch shipyard Koninklijke Maatschappij De Schelde (KMS) had agreed to build the submarine for approximately 942.875 Dutch Guilders. That same year, on 16 September 1911, K I was laid down at the shipyard of KMS and assigned yard number 142. In February and April 1913 the diesel engines of the boat were tested under supervision of Dutch naval technicians, while representatives of the Imperial German Navy also attended. After these tests the submarine was launched on 20 May 1913. At the time the total cost of the K I, including torpedoes and the cost of sending the boat to the Dutch East Indies, was estimated at 1.150.000 Dutch Guilders. The construction of the submarine was supervised by Luitenant ter zee der 1ste klasse G. L. Schorer, who was also appointed as the first commander of the K I.

K I began its sea trials in October 1913 and passed these successfully. On the Dutch East Indies Budget for 2013 500.000 Dutch guilders were reserved which could be used to purchase two more submarines that were identical to the K I if that submarine successfully passed its sea trials. However, these two submarines were never ordered and K I was as a result the only submarine of its kind in the Royal Netherlands Navy. On 12 July 1914 K I was commissioned.

== Design ==
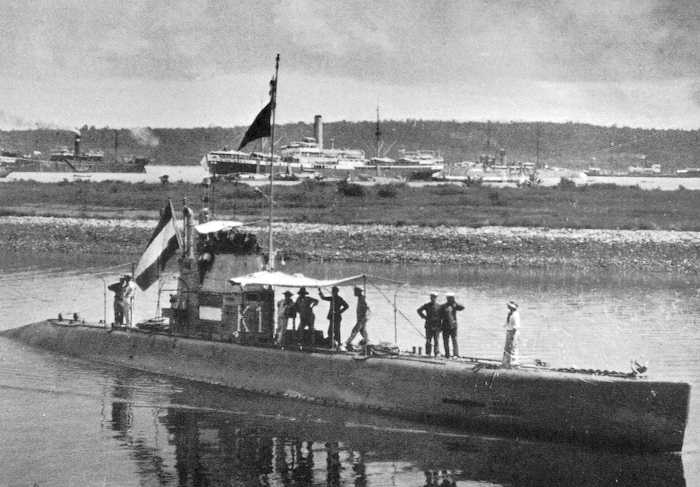
K I at Soerabaja in 1916.

The design of the K I was based on the Hay-Whitehead type that was developed by the Austro-Hungarian firm Whitehead & Co. of Fiume. She measured 48.65 meters in length, 4.69 meters in width and had a draught of 3.22 meters. When it came to weight, the boat had a surface displacement of 385.9 tons and a submerged displacement of 333 tons. The relative small difference in surfaced and submerged displacement of the K I had as effect that the buoyancy of the boat was considered low when it came to prolonged use in the open sea. K I had a diving depth of 40 meters.

=== Armament ===
The K I was armed with three 45 centimeter torpedo tubes of which two were located at the bow and one at the stern. Aboard the boat there was room for a total of nine torpedoes.

=== Propulsion ===
The K I was equipped with two 8-cylinder two-stroke MAN diesel engines that could each produce 900 (combined 1800) brake horsepower. While it was known that this type of diesel engine was inferior to the four-stroke diesel engines that were used by the submarines of the Imperial German Navy at the time, the Royal Netherlands Navy (RNLN) still opted for a two-stroke diesel engine. A possible explanation for this choice was that the RNLN deemed two-stroke diesel engines safer aboard a submarine than four-stroke diesel engines. The two 8-cylinder two-stroke MAN diesel engines could drive the two screws of the K I to a maximum surface speed of 17 knots. The boat had a range of 3500 nautical miles at 11 kn while using its diesel engines on the surface.

Besides the two diesel engines, the submarine also had two electric motors that each could produce 157 bhp and a 130 cells battery with a capacity of 3101 Ah. While using its battery the K I had a range of 30 nautical miles at 8 kn submerged. In order to parry the tropical heat for the vulnerable batteries, she had a large cooling system on board. Later on, an ingenious crew member connected the cooling installation to the ventilation system, which meant that the K I had an air conditioning system, even before it was officially invented.

=== Layout ===
The inside of the K I was not divided into multiple pressure-resistant compartments; only the engine room had a bulkhead which separated it from the rest of boat.

=== Modifications ===
Between 1923 and 1924 the K I got equipped with a new electrically moved aft periscope, new outside muffler flap charges with exhaust pipes to below the waterline and a new William Janney steering pump.

== Service history ==
In April 1915 the Dutch Minister of War and the Minister of the Navy went aboard the submarine for inspection.

12 September 1916 K I began her journey to the Dutch East Indies her theater of operations. For most of the journey she was towed by the tugboat Witte Zee. The route they took paused at The Downs, Vigo, Malta, the Suez Canal, Aden and Colombo arriving at Sabang on 6 November 1916. After arriving in Sabang, Dutch East Indies, the K I became the first, and at the time, only submarine in Southeast Asia. During its journey from the Netherlands to the Dutch East Indies the boat came under fire twice. The first incident took place near Ouessant when a French patrol ship fired at the K I. The second incident happened in the Mediterranean Sea when a British auxiliary cruiser fired at the boat until a French patrol boat notified the British vessel, after which it stopped firing. From Sabang to Batavia K I was escorted by the coastal defence ship Koningin Regentes.

In 1927 The K I was considered old and almost obsolete. As a result, the submarine was taken out of service that year. At the same time it was also decided that the boat would not be replaced. The following year, in 1928, K I was decommissioned.
