= Zeeuws Maritiem muZEEum =

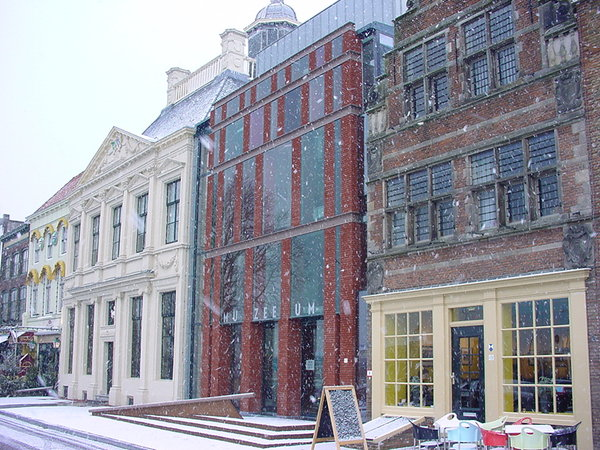
- Zeeuws Maritiem muZEEum
- Established: 2 April 2001
- Location: Vlissingen, Netherlands
- Coordinates: 51.441269°N 3.575425°E
- Type: Maritime History
- Director: Onno Bakker
- Website: http://www.muzeeum.nl/

The Zeeuws Maritime MuZEEum is a maritime museum in the Dutch city of Vlissingen, situated on the marina of the city. It is the successor of the Stedelijk Museum in Vlissingen. It is housed in a building once owned by the Lampsins family, prominent in the shipping business in the 17th century.

== Buildings ==
The muZEEum is housed in a building complex with buildings dating back to the 16th century, connected by modern architecture. One of the main parts of the complex is the Lampsinshuis. The Zeeland merchant Cornelis Lampsins had this house built in the then new style of Dutch Classicism in 1641 on the English Quay (now Nieuwendijk). He moved into it as a residence, but also established the office of the renowned trading house Lampsins which among other things employed Michiel de Ruyter, at the age of 12, as a rope-maker. Behind the Lampsinshuis are the original warehouses of the City Palace that are also this part of the complex. In 2002 the construction began of this complex, designed by RGD Architect Marc van Roosmalen.

In the "Lampsinshuis' the permanent collection is displayed in the Zeeland maritime history. It is organised in the structured layer way of looking at History developed by Fernand Braudel. On each floor can be found this classified theme. The four levels are also arranged thematically as Water, Work, Glory and Adventure.

== Collection ==
The museum's permanent collection consists of the city's historical artifacts and objects showing the maritime history of Zeeland. Inside, the sub-collections and study collections are classified according to the Museum Inventarisatie Project (MusIP).

=== Art ===
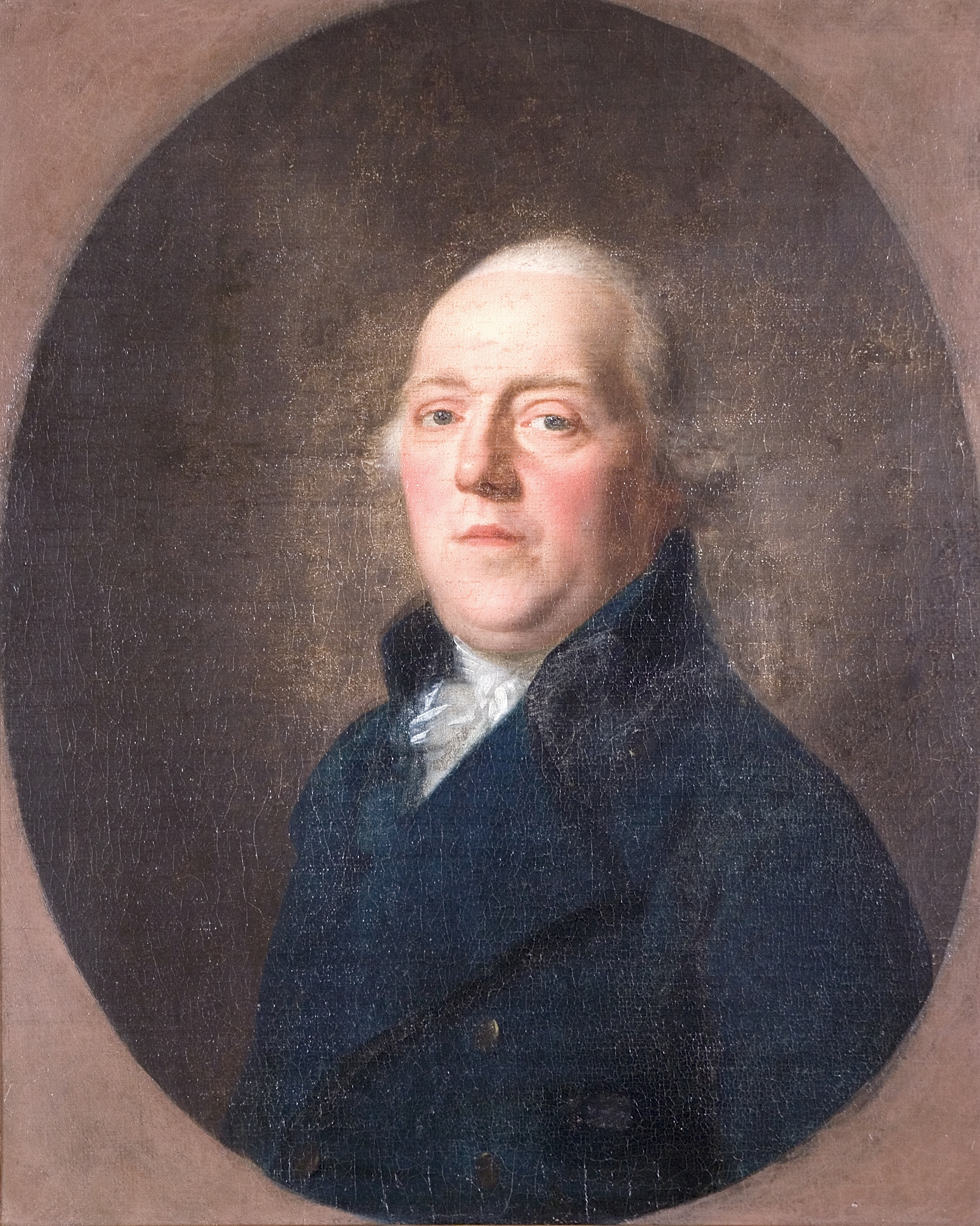
Apollonius Jan Cornelis; Baron Lampsins

In addition to the paintings by members of the Art Society of the South, the muZEEum owns work of several other artists, including:

- Philip van Dijk
- Charles Howard Hodges
- Anselmus van Hulle
- Maarten Krabbé
- Salomon Mesdach
- Jan Willem Pieneman
- Nicolaas Pieneman
- Jan Sanders
- Johannes Christiaan Schotel
- Johann Friedrich August Tischbein
- Pieter Christoffel Wonder

== Awards ==
In 2004, the muZEEum was nominated for the European Museum of the Year Award. In 2008 the museum won the Artifex Award in the category "Increasing visitor numbers". The award is presented by the Cultureel Organisatiebureau Artifex (Artifex Cultural Organisation) and the Platform voor Museale Ontvangsten (Platform for Curatorial Revenue and Events) Additionally muZEEum has received nominations for the Bouwfonds Award and the Schreuder Prize.
