= HNLMS Rotterdam (L800) =

Landing Platform Dock

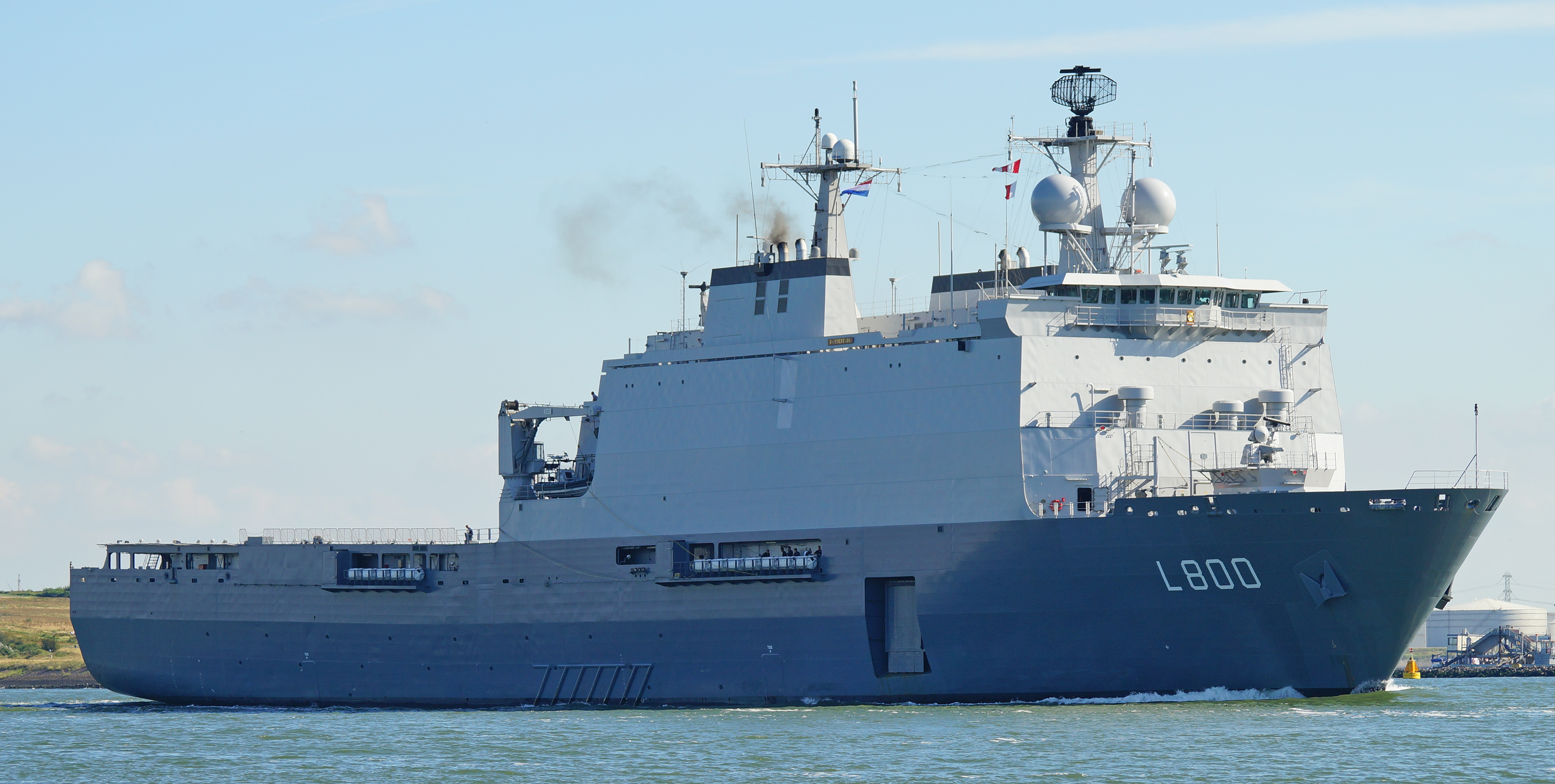
- HNLMS Rotterdam

History

Netherlands
- Name: Rotterdam
- Namesake: Rotterdam
- Operator: Royal Netherlands Navy
- Builder: Damen Schelde Naval Shipbuilding
- Cost: $140m
- Laid down: 23 February 1996
- Launched: 22 February 1997
- Commissioned: 18 April 1998
- Home port: Den Helder
- Identification: IMO number: 9109756; MMSI number: 244159000; Callsign: PARD; Deck code: RD
- Status: in active service
- Badge

General characteristics
- Type: Rotterdam-class landing platform dock
- Displacement: 12,750 t; 14,000 full load
- Length: 166 metres (545 ft)
- Beam: 27 metres (89 ft)
- Draft: 6 metres (20 ft)
- Propulsion: Diesel-electric system; 4 × Stork Wärtsilä 12SW28 diesel generators at 14.6 MW; 4 × Holec electric motor (two in tandem per shaft) at 12 MW; 2 shafts; bow thruster
- Speed: 19 knots (35 km/h; 22 mph)
- Range: 6,000 nautical miles (11,000 km; 6,900 mi) at 12 knots (22 km/h; 14 mph)
- Endurance: 6 weeks
- Boats & landing craft carried: 4 x LCVP
- Capacity: 90 armoured personnel carriers or 32 main battle tanks
- Troops: 611 marines
- Crew: 128
- Sensors & processing systems: Thales NS100 air / surface search; GateKeeper Electro-optical 360° surveillance system; SATCOM, Link 11, JMCIS
- Electronic warfare & decoys: 1 × AN/SLQ-25 Nixie torpedo decoy
- Armament: 2 × Goalkeeper CIWS guns; 8/10 × Browning 12.7 mm machine guns
- Aviation facilities: Hangar for 6 x AgustaWestland Lynx or 3 x NH90 NFH or H215M Cougar helicopter and stern helicopter flight deck

HNLMS Rotterdam (Dutch: Zr.Ms. Rotterdam) is the lead ship in the Rotterdam-class landing platform dock of the Royal Netherlands Navy. The ship is named after the Dutch city of Rotterdam.

== Design ==
HNLMS Rotterdam was the result of a joint project between the Netherlands and Spain, which resulted in the Enforcer design. The ship is equipped with a large helicopter deck for helicopter operations and a dock for large landing craft. The ship has a complete Echelon II hospital – a step above a first aid unit, but below a fully-functional hospital – including an operating theater and intensive care facilities. A surgical team can be stationed on board. The ship also has a desalination system enabling it to convert seawater into drinking water.

=== Modifications ===
In December 2014, the Netherlands Defence Materiel Organisation (DMO) announced the selection of Thales NS100 AESA radar to replace the DA08 air search radar. The new radar was installed on the redesigned foremast of the ship during her 2018 Major Refit Midlife Update Programme as executed by the RNLN Dockyards organisation DMI. She rejoined the fleet in mid-2019.

== History ==
HNLMS Rotterdam was built at the Damen Schelde Naval Shipbuilding in Vlissingen. The keel laying took place on 23 February 1996 and the launching on 22 February 1997. The ship was put into service on 18 April 1998.

The ship participated in an exercise called Floating Care in 1998. In December 1998 she transported Dutch troops to North Macedonia. In 1999 Rotterdam participated in the NATO operation Allied Harbour in Albania. She acted there as transport for Dutch marines and materials. Later that year she participated in the NATO exercise Bright Star off Egypt. In 2000 she would participate in the joint British-French-Dutch-American exercise called Deux Tricolores in the Caribbean. She later supported the Dutch-Canadian battalion for the UN mission UNMEE in Ethiopia and Eritrea. In 2001 she also participated in the NATO exercise Destined Glory off Spain. Rotterdam was sent to Liberia for the UN mission UNMIL in 2003.

In October 2012, while serving as the flagship for Operation Ocean Shield, Rotterdam sank a suspected Somali pirate ship off the east coast of Africa. Rotterdam came under sustained attack from shore based weapons while rescuing the crew of the sunken ship and sustained damage to one of her small boats.

In August 2013 Rotterdam departed for the west coast of Africa to participate in an exercise called African Winds. The ship participated in an exercise called Emerald Move held in the Mediterranean sea in 2016. That same year the Rotterdam, together with HNLMS Johan de Witt, also took part in the NATO exercise Cold Response in the Norwegian Fjords.

In 2017 Rotterdam escorted the Russian frigate Admiral Grigorovich in the North Sea.

In 2020 Rotterdam left the Netherlands for England for an exercise. That same year Rotterdam also participated in Baltic Breeze 2020 alongside other RNLN ships.

== Gallery ==
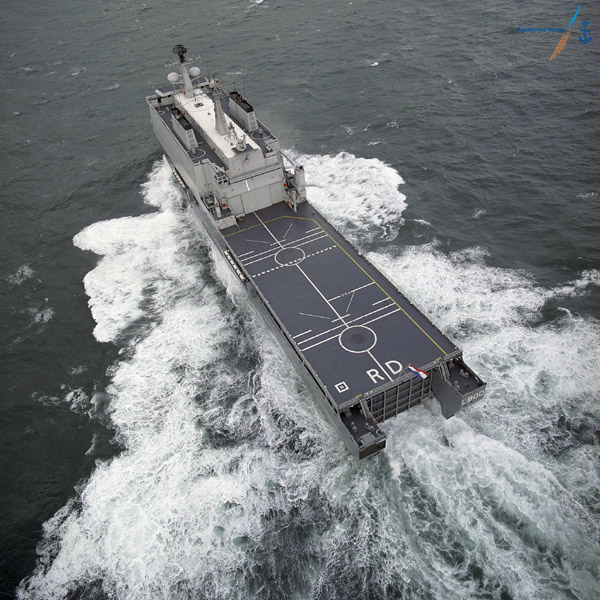
Rotterdam

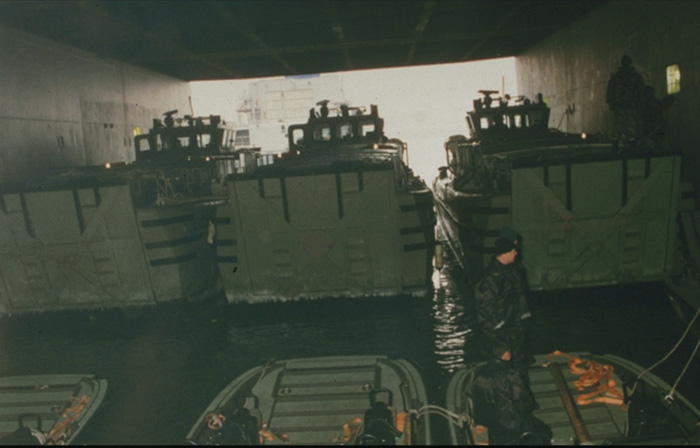
Rotterdam well deck with LCVPs and rigid raider boats

== See also ==
- Galicia-class landing platform dock
- HNLMS Johan de Witt (L801)
