= Albatros-class corvette =

Ship class

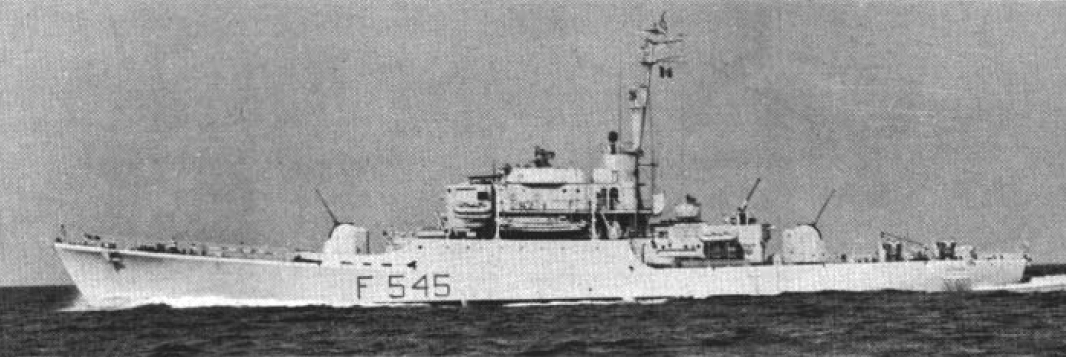

Class overview
- Name: Albatros class
- Operators: Italian Navy; Royal Danish Navy; Royal Netherlands Navy; Indonesian Navy
- Succeeded by: Pietro De Cristofaro class
- In commission: 1955–1991
- Completed: 8
- Retired: 8

General characteristics (As rebuilt)
- Type: Corvette
- Displacement: Standard: 800 t Full load: 950 t
- Length: 69.5 m (228 ft 0 in) pp 76.3 m (250 ft 4 in) oa
- Beam: 9.7 m (31 ft 10 in)
- Draught: 2.8 m (9 ft 2 in)
- Propulsion: 2 shaft, 4 × Fiat M 409 diesels 3,900 kW (5,200 bhp)
- Speed: 35 kilometres per hour; 22 miles per hour (19 kn)
- Range: 9,300 kilometres; 5,800 miles (5,000 nmi) at 33 kilometres per hour; 21 miles per hour (18 kn)
- Complement: 110
- Sensors & processing systems: MLN-1A air/surface search radar; QCU-2 High-frequency sonar
- Armament: 4 × 40 mm L/70 Bofors; 2 × Mark 32 triple 324 mm (13 in) torpedo tubes; 2 × Hedgehogs; 1 × depth charge rack

The Albatros class was a class of eight corvettes designed and built in Italy in the 1950s. Paid for by US funds, they were operated by Italy, Denmark, Indonesia and the Netherlands. The last ships of the class were retired from service in Italy in 1991.

== Design ==
In the early 1950s, the Italian shipyard Ansaldo designed a class of corvettes suitable for coastal escort duties. The design was selected for production in Italian shipyards for NATO navies using US funds under the Mutual Defense Assistance Program, with three ships built for Italy, four for Denmark and one for the Netherlands.

The design had a flush-decked hull, with no raised forecastle, and was powered by two diesel engine giving 3,900 kW (5,200 bhp) which drove two shafts and propelled the ships a speed of 19 knots (35 km/h; 22 mph).

As built, the ships were armed with two 76-millimetre (3 in) SMP 3 automatic cannon, with single turrets, one forward and one aft, and a single twin 40 mm Bofors mount. The SMP 3 was the first model of Italian automatic 76 mm guns, and could fire bursts of shells at 50 rounds per minute from a 14 round drum magazine, with 6-kilogram (13 lb) shells reaching a range of 16,000 m (17,000 yd). Anti-submarine armament consisted of two Hedgehog forward with depth charge projectors and racks aft.

== History ==
The lead ship in the class, Albatros, was completed in 1955, with deliveries continuing until 1957, when the last ship, Bellona, delivered to Denmark in 1957.

The Netherlands found Lynx to be unsuitable, and it was transferred to Italy in 1961, where it was renamed Aquila. In service, the SMP 3 guns proved to be a failure, being too complex and unreliable, (Lynx suffered an explosion in one of its SMP 3 guns during its brief service with the Netherlands Navy) and adversely affecting the ships' seaworthiness. As a result, Italy re-armed its ships in 1963, replacing the 76 mm guns with single 40 mm Bofors guns. Danish ships used U.S. pattern 3-inch guns which were retained for the entire ships service lives.

The Danish ship Diana was discarded in 1974, with Flora being stricken in 1978. The final two Danish ships, Bellona and Triton were discarded in 1981 as they were replaced by the Niels Juel-class corvettes. In 1961, Flora took part in the filming of the giant-monster movie Reptilicus, which became a legend of cheesy cinema and would eventually become an episode of Mystery Science Theater 3000 in 2017.

The Italian ships' anti-submarine armament was improved by replacing the depth charge launchers with two triple torpedo tubes for 324 mm (13 in) anti-submarine torpedoes. Albatros and Alcione were equipped for minesweeping, being fitted with paravanes and equipment davits at the expense of the torpedo tubes, although they retained their designation as corvettes

It had been intended to discard the Italian ships in 1982–83, but they were kept in service to meet a continuing need for coastal patrol vessels. Albatros was the first Italian ship to be discarded, being decommissioned in 1985, but used as an accommodation hulk until stricken in April 1989. The remaining three ships were discarded in 1991.

== Ships in class ==
Name	Number	Builder	Launched	Commissioned	Fate
Italy
Albatros	F 543	Navalmeccanica, Castellammare di Stabia	18 July 1954	1 June 1955	Hulked 30 April 1985 Stricken 30 April 1989
Alcione	F 544	Navalmeccanica, Castellammare di Stabia	19 September 1954	23 October 1955	Stricken 1991
Airone	F 545	Navalmeccanica, Castellammare di Stabia	21 November 1954	29 December 1955	Stricken 1991
Aquila	F 542	Breda Marghera Yard, Venice	Ex-Netherlands Lynx; Transferred to Italy 18 October 1961		Stricken 1991
Denmark
Bellona	F 344	Navalmeccanica, Castellammare di Stabia	9 January 1955	31 January 1957	Stricken 1981
Diana	F 345	Cantiere del Tirreno, Riva, Trigoso	19 December 1954	30 July 1955	Stricken 1974
Flora	F 346	Cantiere del Tirreno, Riva, Trigoso	25 June 1955	28 August 1956	Stricken 1978
Triton	F 347	Cantiere Navali di Taranto	12 September 1954	10 August 1955	Stricken 1981
Netherlands
Lynx	F 923	Breda Marghera Yard, Venice	31 July 1954	2 October 1956	Transferred to Italy 18 October 1961
Indonesia
Pattimura	257, later 371	Ansaldo, Livorno, Italy	1 July 1956	28 January 1958	Stricken 1985
Sultan Hasanudin	253, later 372	Ansaldo, Livorno, Italy	24 March 1957	8 March 1958	Stricken 1979
