= HNLMS K III =

Ship from 1920

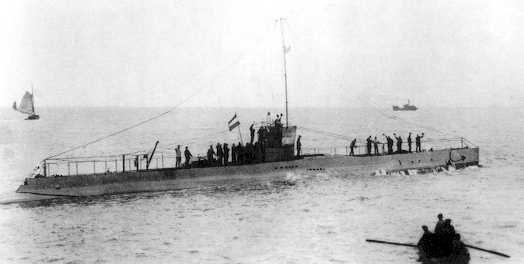
- K III

History

Netherlands
- Name: K III
- Builder: De Schelde, Flushing
- Laid down: 15 July 1915
- Launched: 12 August 1919
- Commissioned: 9 July 1920
- Decommissioned: 1934
- Fate: Decommissioned 1934

General characteristics
- Class & type: K III-class submarine
- Displacement: 583 tons surfaced; 721 tons submerged
- Length: 64.41 m (211 ft 4 in)
- Beam: 5.6 m (18 ft 4 in)
- Draught: 3.56 m (11 ft 8 in)
- Propulsion: 2 × 900 bhp (671 kW) diesel engines; 2 × 210 bhp (157 kW) electric motors
- Speed: 16.5 kn (30.6 km/h; 19.0 mph) surfaced; 8.5 kn (15.7 km/h; 9.8 mph) submerged
- Range: 3,500 nmi (6,500 km; 4,000 mi) at 11 kn (20 km/h; 13 mph) on the surface; 25 nmi (46 km; 29 mi) at 8.5 kn (15.7 km/h; 9.8 mph) submerged
- Complement: 29
- Armament: 2 × 18 inch bow torpedo tubes; 2 × 18 inch external-traversing torpedo tubes forward of the conning tower; 1 x 75 mm gun; 1 x 12.7 mm machine gun

K III was a K III-class patrol submarine of the Royal Netherlands Navy. The ship was built by De Schelde shipyard in Flushing.

== Service history ==
The submarine was ordered in 1915 and 15 July that year K III was laid down in Flushing at the shipyard of De Schelde. The launch took place on 12 August 1919. On 9 July 1920 the ship is commissioned in the Dutch navy.

On 4 September 1920 K III began her journey to the Dutch East Indies, her theater of operations. She was the first submarine of the navy to make the journey without an escort. The route she took paused in Ferrol, Algiers, Malta, the Suez Canal, Aden and Colombo arriving at Tanjung Priok on 18 December 1920.

In 1934 K III was decommissioned.
