= K III-class submarine =

Dutch class of submarines

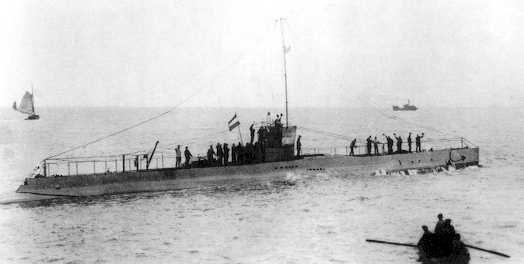
- K III

Class overview
- Name: K III class
- Builders: Koninklijke Maatschappij De Schelde, Vlissingen
- Operators: Royal Netherlands Navy
- Preceded by: K II
- Succeeded by: K V class
- Built: 1915-1921
- Completed: 2

General characteristics
- Type: Submarine
- Displacement: 583 tons surfaced (K III); 579 tons surfaced (K IV); 721 tons submerged
- Length: 64.41 m (211 ft 4 in)
- Beam: 5.6 m (18 ft 4 in)
- Draught: 3.56 m (11 ft 8 in)
- Propulsion: 2 × 900 bhp (671 kW) diesel engines (K III); 2 × 600 bhp (447 kW) diesel engines (K IV); 2 × 210 hp (157 kW) electric motors
- Speed: 16.5 kn (30.6 km/h; 19.0 mph) surfaced (K III); 15 kn (28 km/h; 17 mph) surfaced (K IV); 8.5 kn (15.7 km/h; 9.8 mph) submerged
- Range: 3,500 nmi (6,500 km; 4,000 mi) at 11 kn (20 km/h; 13 mph) on the surface; 25 nmi (46 km; 29 mi) at 8.5 kn (15.7 km/h; 9.8 mph) submerged
- Complement: 29
- Armament: 2 × 18 inch bow torpedo tubes; 2 × 18 inch external-traversing torpedo tubes forward of the conning tower; 1 x 75 mm gun; 1 x 12.7 mm machine gun

The K III class was a class of two patrol submarines, built by Koninklijke Maatschappij De Schelde in Vlissingen for the Royal Netherlands Navy. They were used for patrols in the Dutch colonial waters. The submarines' diving depth was 40 metres (130 ft). The design for the double-hulled boats came from the American Electric Boat Company.

== Construction ==
Name	Laid down	Launched	Commissioned	Decommissioned
K III	15 July 1915	12 August 1919	9 July 1920	1934
K IV	30 December 1915	2 July 1920	27 April 1921	1936
