= HNLMS K IV =

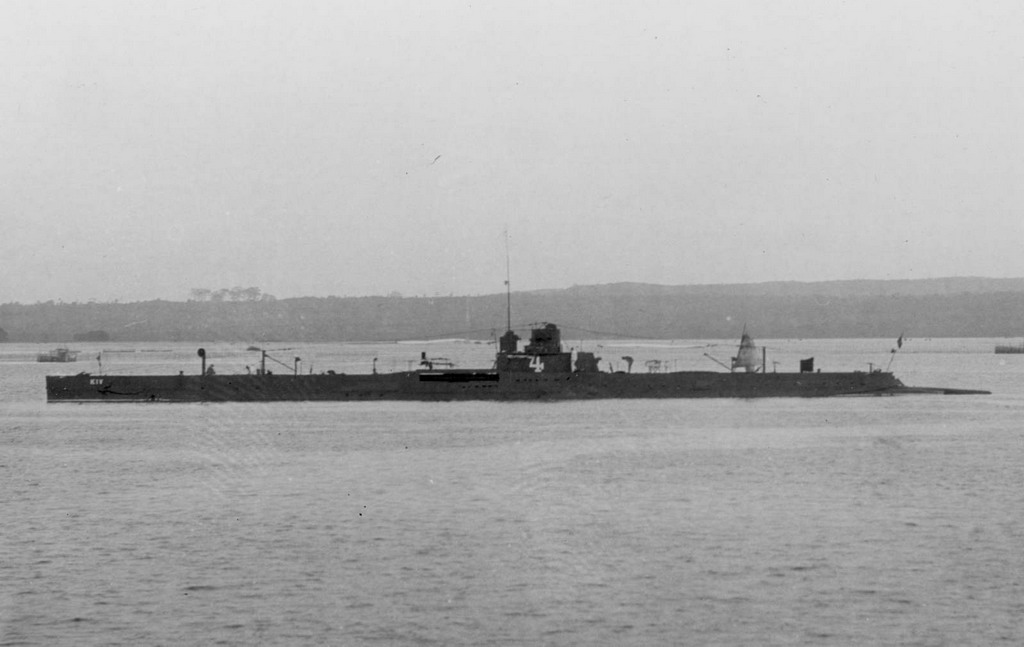
- K IV

History

Netherlands
- Name: K IV
- Builder: De Schelde, Flushing
- Laid down: 30 December 1915
- Launched: 2 July 1920
- Commissioned: 27 April 1921
- Decommissioned: 1936

General characteristics
- Class & type: K III-class submarine
- Displacement: 579 tons surfaced; 721 tons submerged
- Length: 64.41 m (211 ft 4 in)
- Beam: 5.6 m (18 ft 4 in)
- Draught: 3.56 m (11 ft 8 in)
- Propulsion: 2 × 600 bhp (447 kW) diesel engines; 2 × 210 bhp (157 kW) electric motors
- Speed: 15 kn (28 km/h; 17 mph) surfaced; 8.5 kn (15.7 km/h; 9.8 mph) submerged
- Range: 3,500 nmi (6,500 km; 4,000 mi) at 11 kn (20 km/h; 13 mph) on the surface; 25 nmi (46 km; 29 mi) at 8.5 kn (15.7 km/h; 9.8 mph) submerged
- Complement: 29
- Armament: 2 × 18 inch bow torpedo tubes; 2 × 18 inch external-traversing torpedo tubes forward of the conning tower; 1 x 75 mm gun; 1 x 12.7 mm machine gun

K IV was a K III-class patrol submarine of the Royal Netherlands Navy. The ship was built by De Schelde shipyard in Flushing.

== Service history ==
The submarine was ordered on 1 October 1915, and on 30 December that year K III was laid down in Flushing at the shipyard of De Schelde. The launch took place on 2 July 1920. On 27 April 1921 the ship is commissioned in the Dutch navy.

On 3 September 1921 K IV began her journey to the Dutch East Indies, her theater of operations. The route she took made stops in Algiers, the Suez Canal, Aden and Colombo arriving at Tanjung Priok on 23 December 1921. While in Colombo an explosion in the forward battery compartment occurred killing two men and wounding another.

In 1936 K IV was decommissioned.
