= HNLMS Lynx =

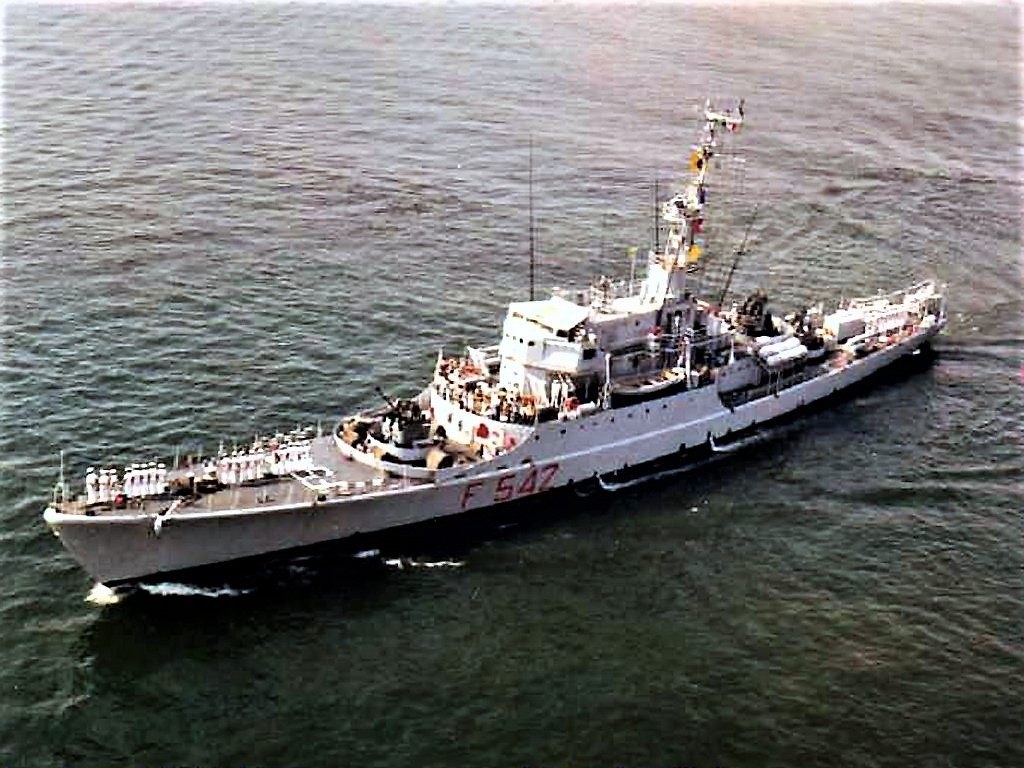
- Former HNLMS Lynx in Italian service as Aquila in 1978.

History

Netherlands
- Name: Lynx
- Builder: Breda Cantieri Navale S.B.A. Mestre, Venice, Italy
- Laid down: 25 July 1953
- Launched: 31 July 1954
- Commissioned: 2 October 1956
- Identification: F 823

Italy
- Name: Aquila
- Acquired: 1961

General characteristics
- Type: Frigate (1956-1961)
- Displacement: 800 t (790 long tons) standard; 950 t (930 long tons) full load
- Length: 76.29 m (250 ft 4 in)
- Beam: 9.60 m (31 ft 6 in)
- Draught: 2.54 m (8 ft 4 in)
- Propulsion: 2 shafts; 5,200 bhp (3,900 kW); 2 x Fiat diesel engines
- Speed: 20 knots (37 km/h; 23 mph)
- Crew: 99
- Sensors & processing systems: QCU-2 sonar
- Armament: 2 x 7.6 cm guns; 2 x 40 mm guns; 2 x hedgehogs; 1 x depth charge rack; 4 x depth charge throwers

HNLMS Lynx was a frigate that served between 1956 and 1961 in the Royal Netherlands Navy (RNLN). She was built in Italy at the Breda Cantieri Navale and based on the Albatros-class corvette. Lynx was transferred to the Netherlands in 1956 by the United States as part of the Mutual Defense Assistance Program (MDAP). On arrival she was initially added to the Roofdier class, however, as sole ship of its design Lynx was deemed unsuitable and eventually put in reserve. Five years later, in 1961, Lynx was transferred to Italy where she was renamed Aquila.

== Design ==
The design of Lynx was based on the Albatros-class corvette. She had a standard displacement of 800 tonnes (790 long tons) and a full load displacement of 950 tonnes (930 long tons). When it came to measurements Lynx had a length of 76.29 metres (250 ft 4 in), a beam of 9.60 metres (31 ft 6 in) and a draught of 2.54 metres (8 ft 4 in). The ship's complement was 99.

=== Armament and sensors ===
Lynx was armed with two 7.6-centimetre (3.0 in) naval guns and two 40-millimetre (1.6 in) guns. In addition, she was equipped with two hedgehogs, a single depth charge rack and four depth charge throwers. Furthermore, Lynx mounted a QCU-2 sonar.

=== Propulsion ===
Lynx was equipped with two Fiat diesel engines that could produce 5,200 brake horsepower (3,900 kW). This could drive the two shafts of Lynx to maximum speed of 20 knots (37 km/h; 23 mph). At a speed of 18 knots (33 km/h; 21 mph) she had a range of 2,400 nautical miles (4,400 km; 2,800 mi).

== Citations ==
=== Bibliography ===
- Gardiner, Robert; Chumbley, Stephen; Budzbon, Przemysław, eds. (1995). Conway's All the World's Fighting Ships 1947–1995. Annapolis: Naval Institute Press. ISBN 1-55750-132-7.
- Ministerie van Marine, ed. (1959). "Overzicht der oorlogsschepen". Jaarboek van de Koninklijke Marine, 1958 (in Dutch). The Hague: Staatsdrukkerij en uitgeverijbedrijf. pp. 246–267.
- Raven, G.J.A., ed. (1988). De kroon op het anker: 175 jaar Koninklijke Marine (in Dutch). Amsterdam: De Bataafsche Leeuw. ISBN 90-6707-200-1.
- Schoonoord, D.C.L. (2012). Pugno pro patria: de Koninklijke Marine tijdens de Koude Oorlog (in Dutch). Franeker: Van Wijnen. ISBN 978-90-5194-455-6.
- van Amstel, W.H.E. (1991). De schepen van de Koninklijke Marine vanaf 1945 (in Dutch). Alkmaar: De Alk. ISBN 90-6013-997-6.
