= List of frigates of the Hellenic Navy =

Ships in service with the Hellenic Navy currently include frigates of the Hydra and Elli classes. In the late twentieth century the navy also used Knox-class frigates. Going back to the early nineteenth century, sailing ships such as the Hellas were in service.

== Serving ==
=== Kimon (FDI HN) class ===
- F-601 Kimon (Κίμων)

=== Hydra (MEKO 200) class ===
- F-452 Hydra (Ύδρα)
- F-453 Spetsai (Σπέτσαι)
- F-454 Psara (Ψαρά)
- F-455 Salamis (Σαλαμίς)

=== Elli (Kortenaer/Standard) class ===
- F-450 Elli (Έλλη)
- F-451 Limnos (Λήμνος)
- F-459 Adrias (Αδριάς)
- F-460 Aigaion (Αιγαίον)
- F-461 Navarinon (Ναβαρίνον)
- F-462 Kountouriotis (Κουντουριώτης)
- F-464 Kanaris (Κανάρης)
- F-465 Themistoklis (Θεμιστοκλής)
- F-466 Nikiforos Fokas (Νικηφόρος Φωκάς)

== Historical ==
=== Sail ===
- Hellas (1826-1831)

=== Knox class ===
- Ipiros (F456) (1992-2002)
- Thraki (F457) (1992-2001)
- Macedonia (F458) (1992-1998)

=== Elli class ===
- F-463 Bouboulina (Μπουμπουλίνα) (2001-2013)
