= Greek ship Aigaion =

At least three ships of the Hellenic Navy have borne the name Aigaion (Greek: Αιγαίον, "Aegean"):

- Greek destroyer Aigaion (L95), a Hunt-class destroyer launched in 1941 as HMS Lauderdale and transferred to Greece and renamed in 1946. She was returned to the Royal Navy in 1959 and scrapped in 1960.
- Greek destroyer tender Aigaion (D03), a Rhein-class destroyer tender launched in 1960 as Weser for the German navy she was transferred to Greece in 1976 and renamed. She was stricken in 1991.
- Greek frigate Aigaion (F-460), an Elli-class frigate launched in 1978 as HNLMS Banckert she was transferred to Greece in 1993 and renamed.
