= HNLMS Abraham Crijnssen =

Two ships of the Royal Netherlands Navy have been named HNLMS Abraham Crijnssen, after the 17th century naval commander Abraham Crijnssen:

- HNLMS Abraham Crijnssen (1936), a Jan van Amstel-class minesweeper that entered service in 1937, operated by the Royal Australian Navy between 1942 and 1943, decommissioned in 1960, and preserved as a museum ship
- HNLMS Abraham Crijnssen (F816), a Kortenaer-class frigate that entered service in 1983, left service in 1997, and was sold to the United Arab Emirates
