= HNLMS Banckert =

HNLMS Banckert (Dutch: Hr.Ms. or Zr.Ms. Banckert) may refer to following ships of the Royal Netherlands Navy:

- HNLMS Banckert (1929), an Admiralen-class destroyer
- HNLMS Banckert (D801), previously HMS Quilliam, acquired in 1945 and scrapped in 1957
- HNLMS Banckert (F810), a Kortenaer-class frigate
