= Elli-class frigate =

Class of ships of the Hellenic Navy

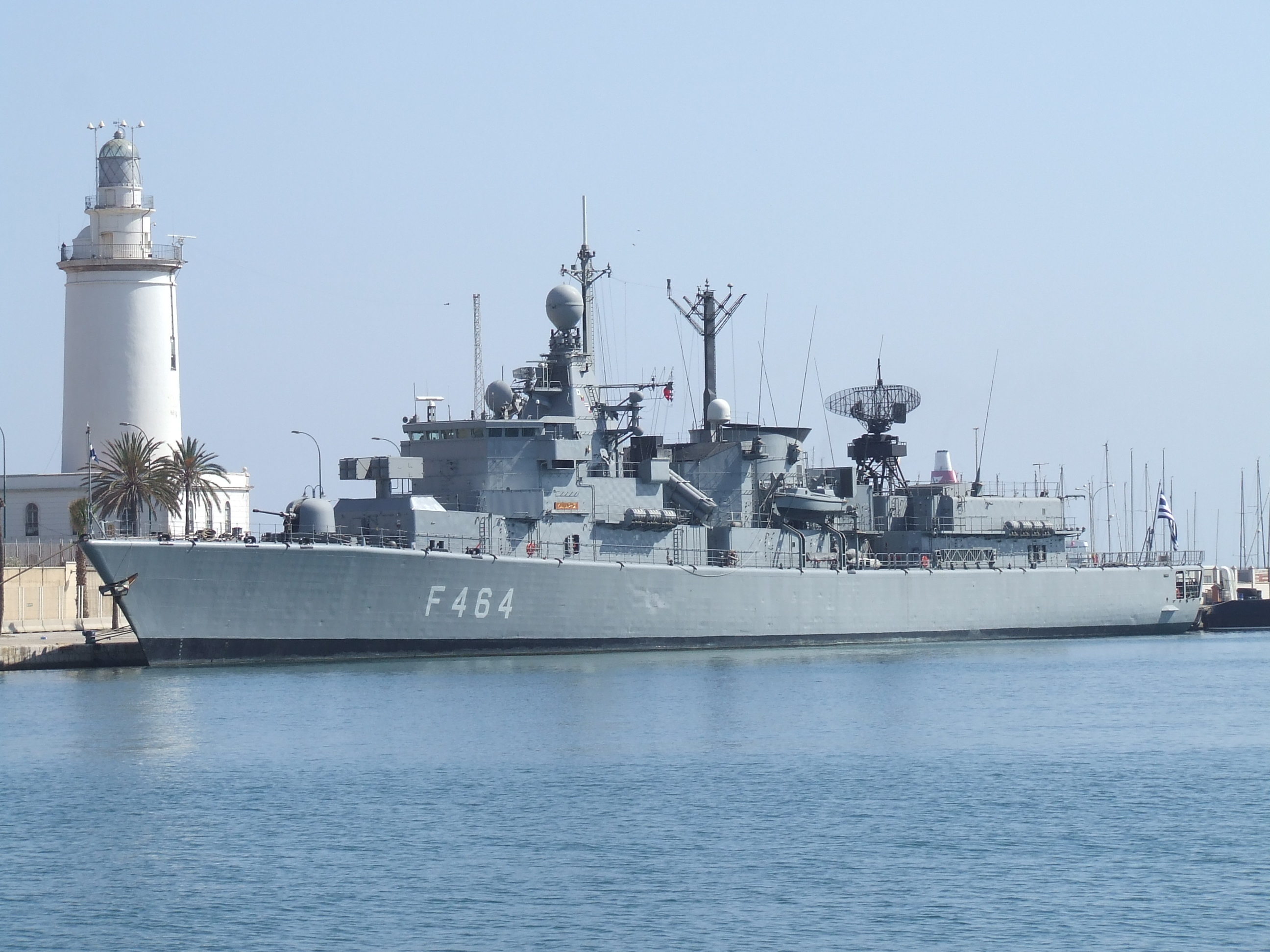
- HS Kanaris (ex HNLMS Jan Van Brakel)

Class overview
- Operators: Hellenic Navy
- Succeeded by: Kimon class
- Completed: 10
- Active: 8
- Retired: 2

General characteristics
- Type: Frigate
- Displacement: 3,500 tons standard; 3,800 tons max
- Length: 130 m (430 ft)
- Beam: 14.5 m (48 ft)
- Draft: 4.4 m (14 ft 5 in)
- Propulsion: combined gas or gas (COGOG) system; 2 Rolls-Royce Tyne RM1C gas turbines, 4,900 shp (3,700 kW) each; 2 Rolls-Royce Olympus TM3B gas turbines, 25,700 shp (19,200 kW) each (boost); 2 shafts
- Speed: 20 knots (37 km/h) cruising; 30 knots (56 km/h) maximum
- Range: 4,700 nmi (8,700 km) at 16 knots (30 km/h)
- Complement: 185-220 Officers and Petty Officers (depending on each ship)
- Armament: Elli-class S-frigate (Elli, Limnos): 2 × OTO-Melara Compatto 76 mm/62 cal. gun; 2 × 4 RGM-84 Harpoon SSM; 1 × 8 round RIM-7M Sea Sparrow SAM launcher (+ reloads); 2 × Mk32 × 2 324 mm Torpedo Tubes; 2 × CIWS Mk15 Phalanx CIWS 20 mm; ex-Dutch S-frigates in Greek service: 1 × OTO-Melara Compatto 76 mm/62 cal. gun; 2 × 4 RGM-84 Harpoon SSM; 1 × 8 round RIM-7M Sea Sparrow SAM launcher (+ reloads); 2 × Mk32 × 2 324 mm Torpedo Tubes; 1 × CIWS Mk15 Phalanx CIWS 20 mm
- Aircraft carried: 1-2 helicopters (1 SH-70B or 2 AB-212)

The Elli-class frigates are a series of frigates operated by the Hellenic Navy. The ships are of Dutch origin and are also known as Kortenaer-class or Standard-class or S-class frigates. The first two ships (Elli and Limnos), which have lengthened hangars and different armament were built specifically for the Hellenic Navy. The remaining ships are ex-Royal Netherlands Navy S-frigates of the Kortenaer class transferred to the Hellenic Navy in the 1990s and early 2000s. These robust and reliable ships constitute the backbone of the Hellenic Navy. Elli, for which the class is named, is itself named after two famous Greek cruisers, one of which was sunk during peacetime before the Greco-Italian War.

== Mid-life modernization project ==
There was a mid life modernization programme for six of the ten Greek ships which started in 2004 and was completed in 2009. The program was performed at Hellenic Shipyards and the upgraded frigates were the following: Kountouriotis (F-462), Adrias (F-459), Navarinon (F-461), Limnos (F-451), Elli (F-450), and Aegaeon (F-460).

The main modernization work included the following:

- Replacement of the combat management system with the Thales TACTICOS
- Installation of new sensors, like the Thales Mirador electro-optical target tracker
- Installation of Thales Scout MkII LPI navigation radar
- Overhaul and improvement of radars (WM25 and LW08 long range air-search radar)
- Installation of EDO (now part of Harris Corporation) CS-3701 ESM system
- Replacement of navigation systems and upgrade of communications systems
- Replacement of propulsion control system and of defined platform systems.

Bouboulina (F-463) was decommissioned on 18 February 2013. It will be used as a source for spare parts.

== Incidents at sea ==
On 2 November 2017 Kanaris ran aground near the islet Atalanti, southwest of Psyttaleia in the Saronic Gulf, on the way back to the Salamis Naval Base. There were no personnel injuries and no fuel leaks but there was serious hull damage which according to news reports affected the SONAR shell. After 8 months of absence for repairs the ship was again operational in July 2018 using the SONAR and dome from decommissioned Bouboulina (F-463).

== Ships ==
Ship	Namesake	Commissioning date into the Royal Netherlands Navy	Commissioning into the Hellenic Navy	Status
Aigaion (F-460) Φ/Γ Αιγαίον	Aegean Sea	29 October 1980	14 May 1993	In service
Adrias (F-459) Φ/Γ Αδρίας	Adriatic Sea	26 July 1979	30 June 1995	In service
Bouboulina (F-463) Φ/Γ Μπουμπουλίνα	Laskarina Bouboulina	11 October 1983	14 December 2001	Decommissioned (18 February 2013)
Elli (F-450) Φ/Γ Έλλη	Naval Battle of Elli		1982	In service
Kanaris (F-464) Φ/Γ Κανάρης	Konstantinos Kanaris	14 April 1983	29 November 2002	In service
Kountouriotis (F-462) Φ/Γ Κουντουριώτης	Pavlos Kountouriotis	26 October 1978	15 December 1997	In service
Limnos (F-451) Φ/Γ Λήμνος	Naval Battle of Lemnos		18 September 1982	In service
Navarinon (F-461) Φ/Γ Ναυαρίνον	Battle of Navarino	24 April 1980	1 March 1995	In service
Nikiforos Fokas (F-466) Φ/Γ Νικηφόρος Φωκάς	Nikephoros II	25 November 1982	2003	In service
Themistoklis (F-465) Φ/Γ Θεμιστοκλής -	Themistocles	2 December 1981	2003	Decommissioned (20 March 2026)

== Gallery ==
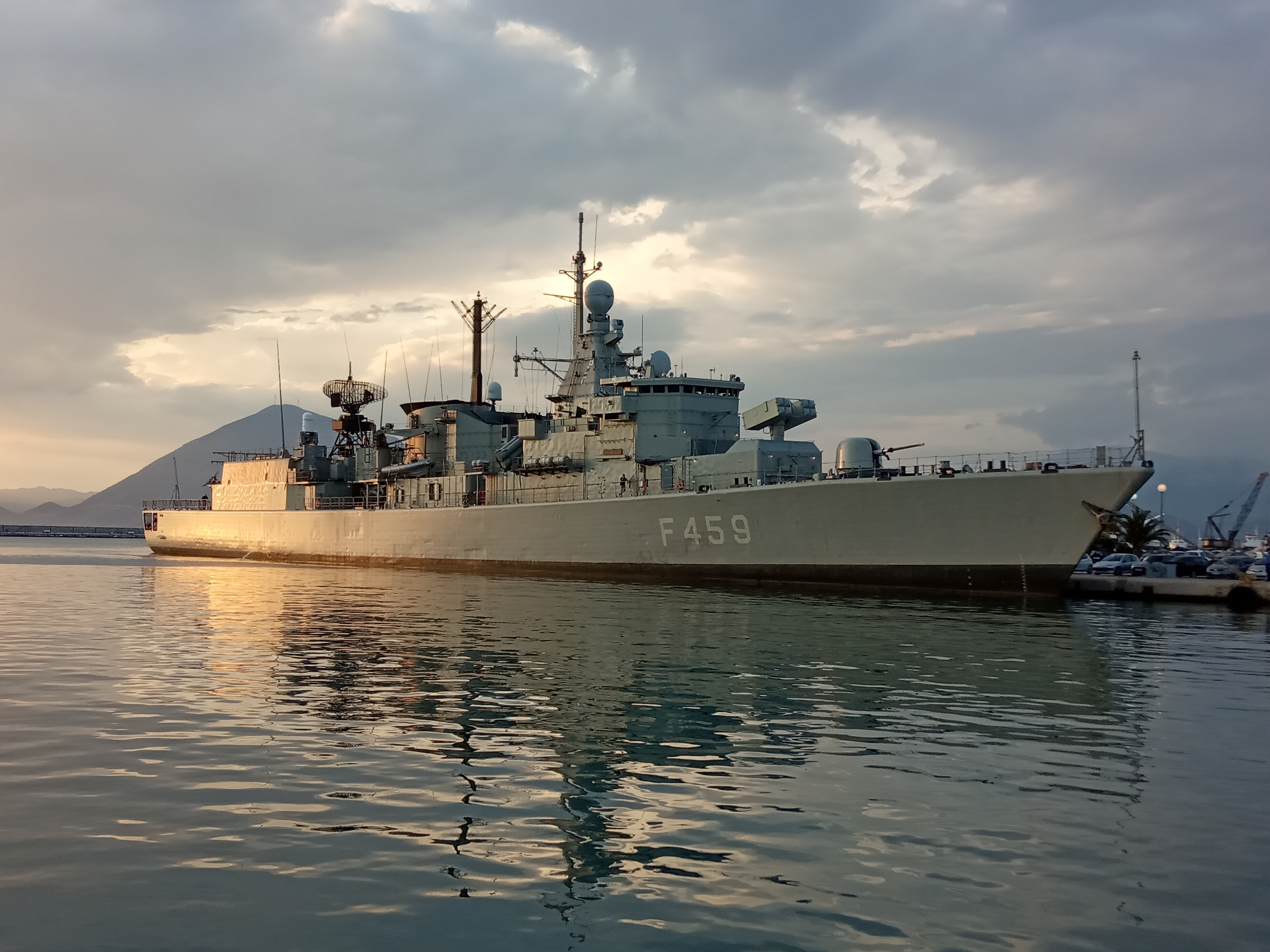
HS Adrias (F-459) anchored in the old (north) port of Patras, Greece (June 2020)

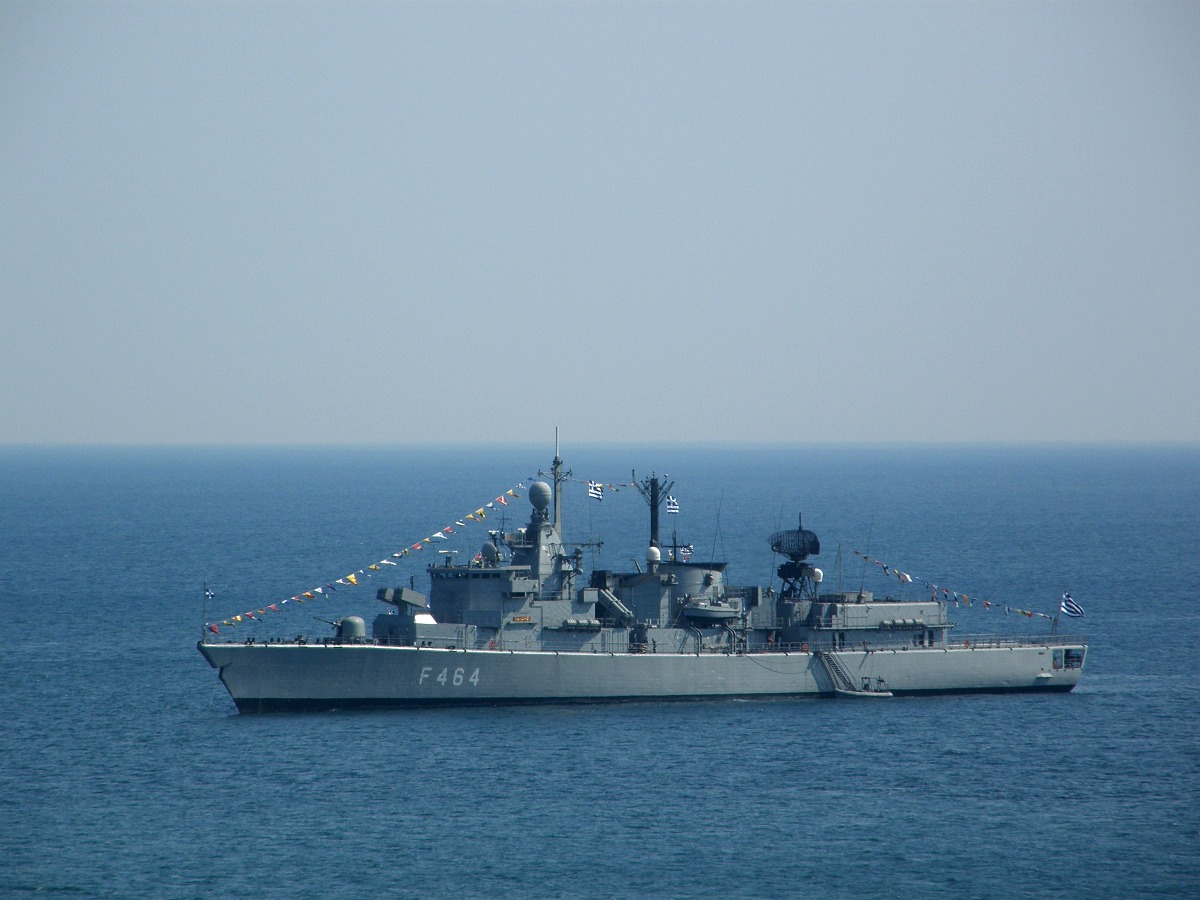
HS Kanaris (F-464)

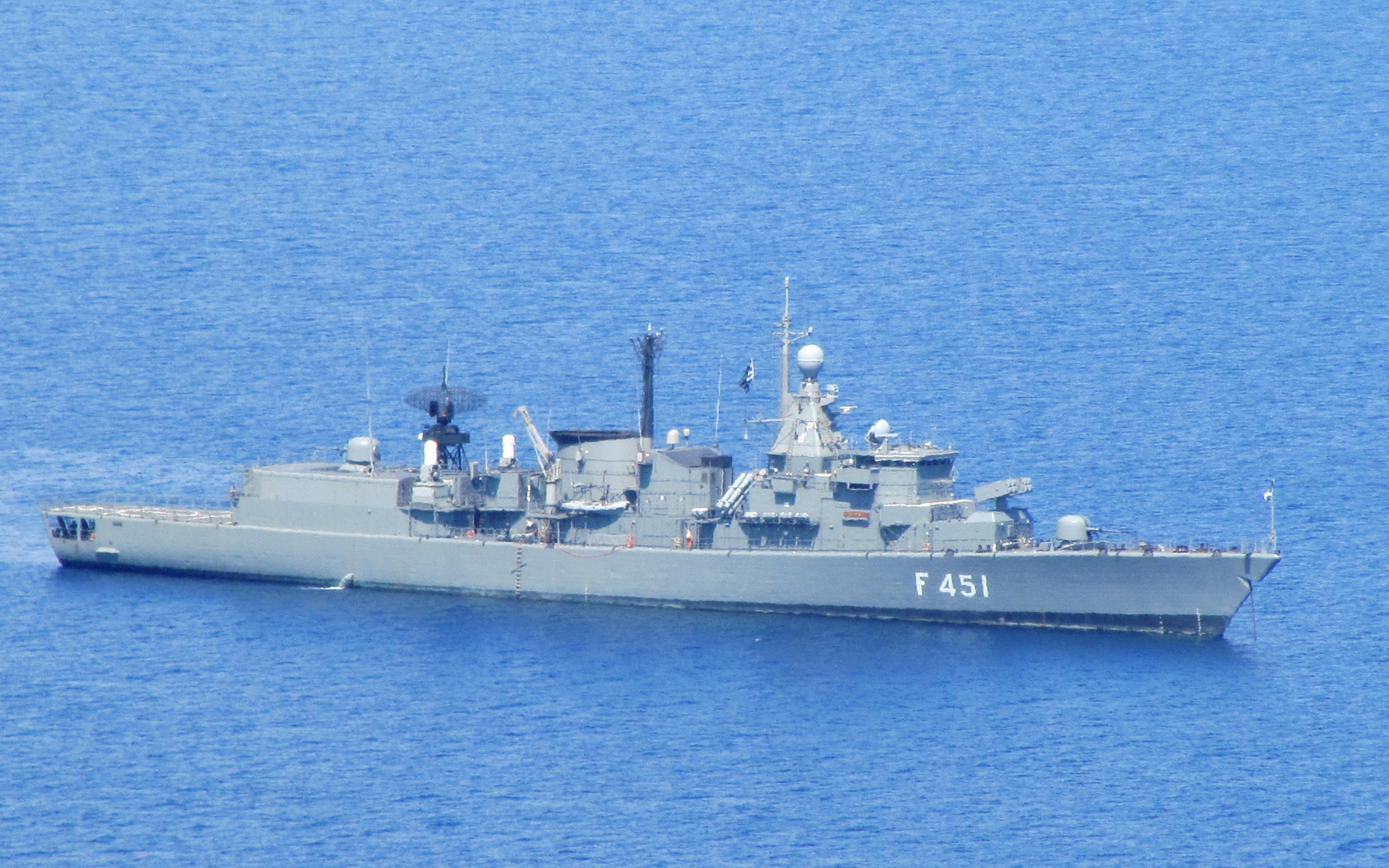
HS Limnos (F-451)

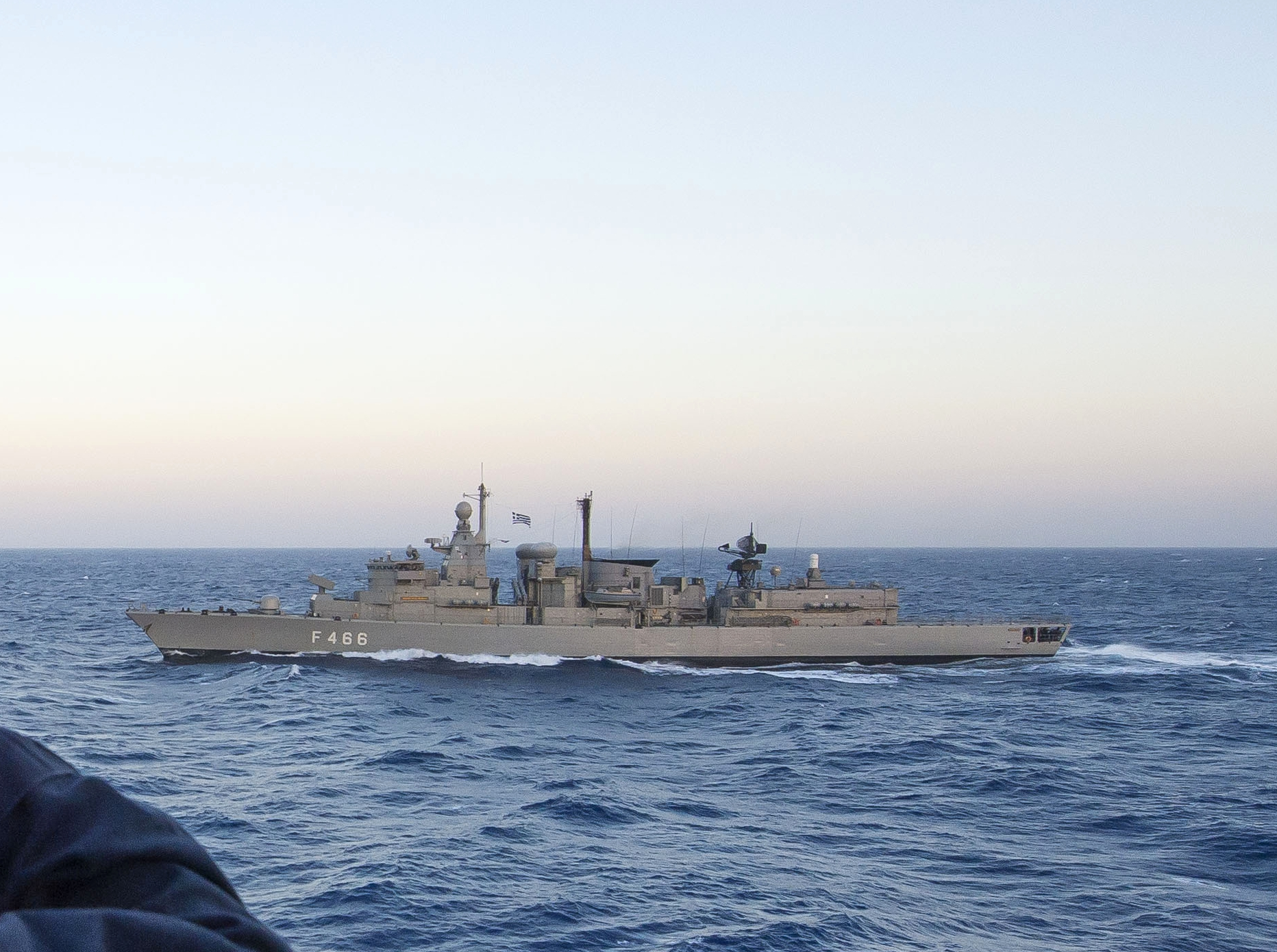
HS Nikiforos Fokas (F-466) at sea in August 2014

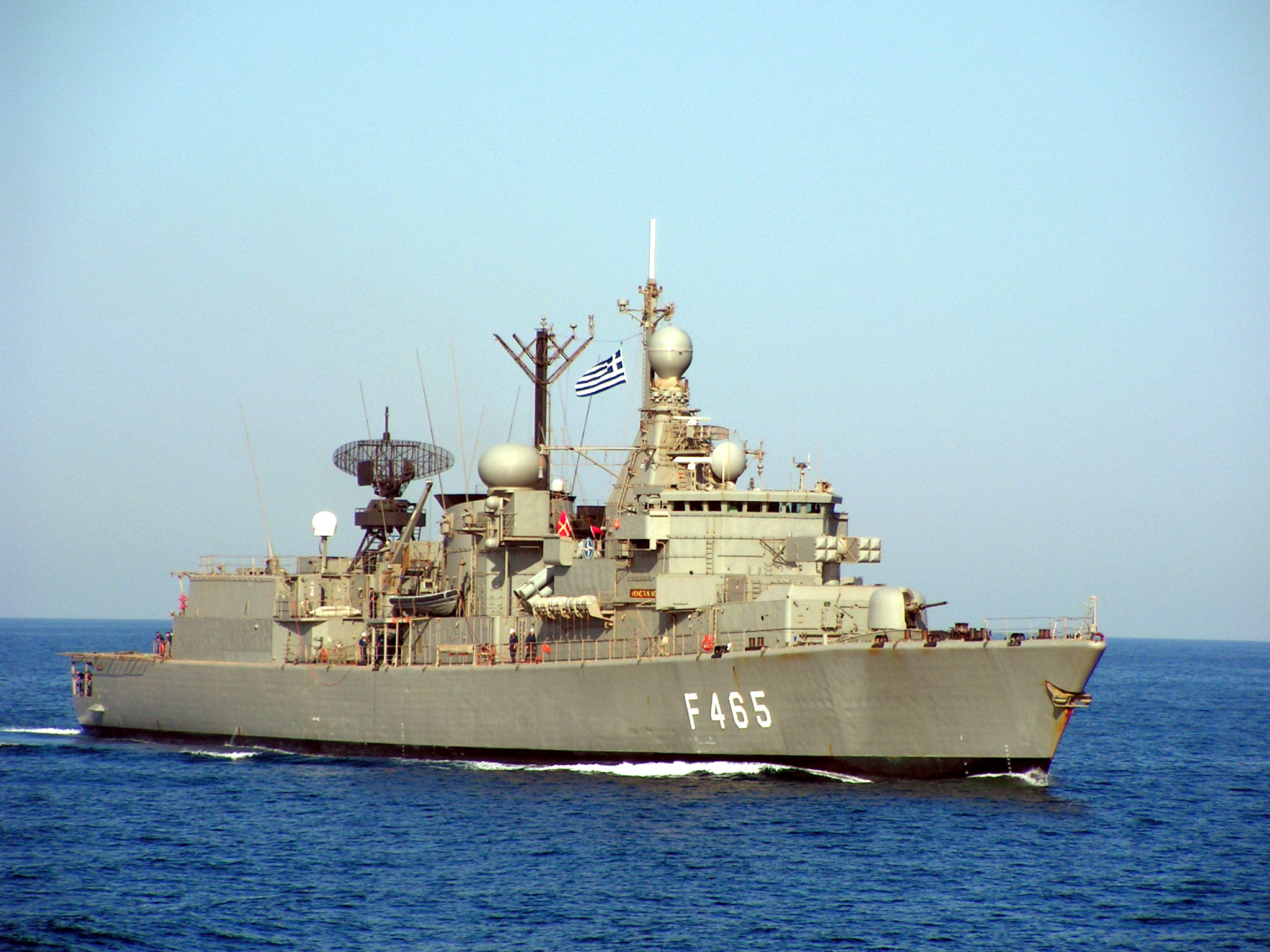
HS Themistocles (F-465)

== See also ==
- List of frigates of the Hellenic Navy
