= Banckert =

Banckert is a Dutch surname. Notable people with the name include:

- Adriaen Banckert (1615–1684), Dutch admiral
- Joost Banckert (1597–1647), Dutch vice admiral

== See also ==
- HNLMS Banckert, name of several ships in service with the Royal Netherlands Navy
- Bankert
