= HNLMS Piet Hein (F811) =

Dutch naval frigate (1981–1998)

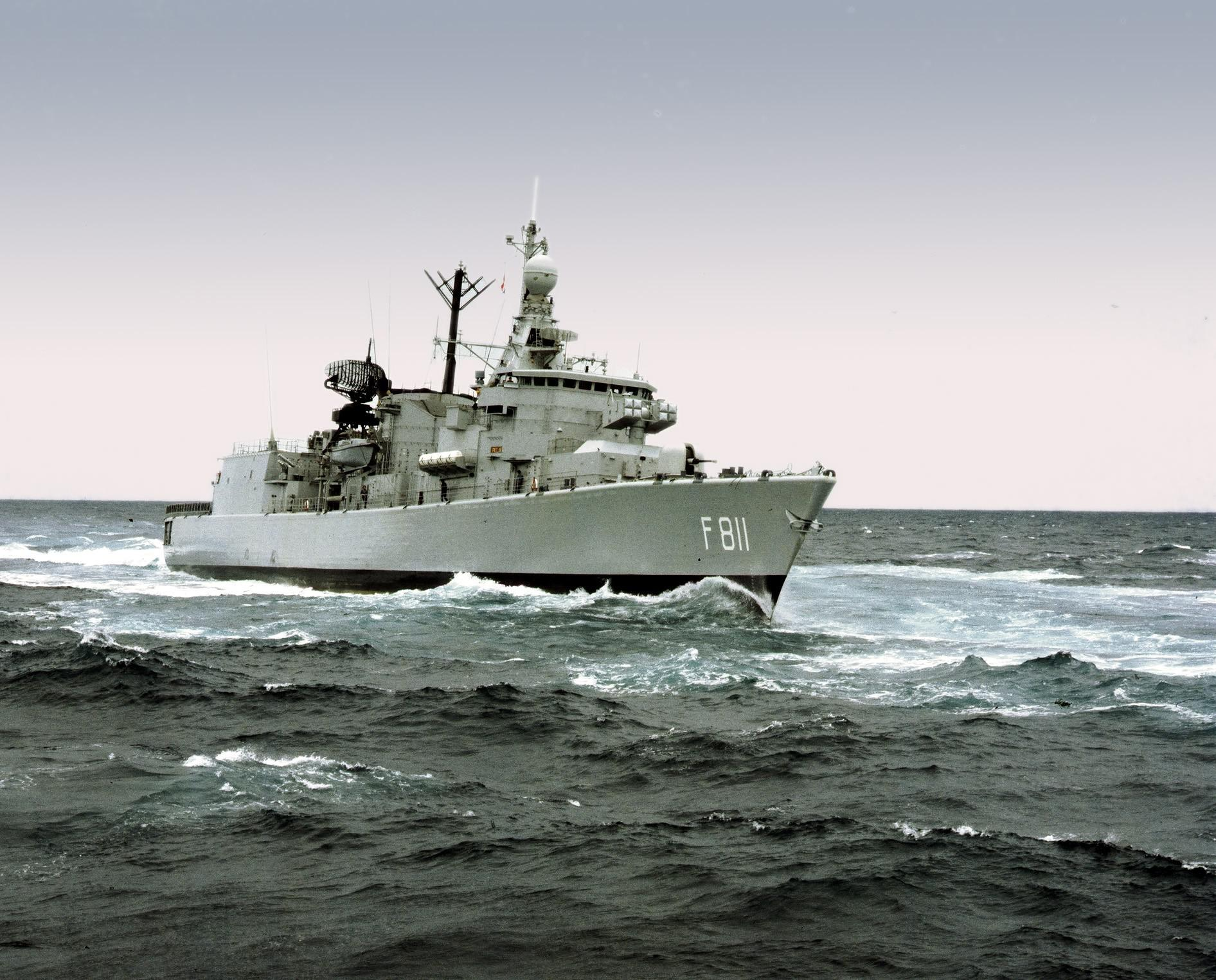
- Piet Hein at sea

History

Netherlands
- Name: Piet Hein
- Namesake: Piet Pieterszoon Hein
- Builder: KM de Schelde, Vlissingen
- Laid down: 28 April 1977
- Launched: 3 June 1978
- Commissioned: 14 April 1981
- Decommissioned: 1998
- Fate: Sold to United Arab Emirates

United Arab Emirates
- Name: Al Emirat
- Commissioned: 27 June 1998
- Decommissioned: 2008
- Identification: F02
- Fate: Rebuilt as yacht

United Arab Emirates
- Name: Yas
- Owner: Hamdan bin Zayed bin Sultan Al Nahyan
- Acquired: 2005
- Commissioned: 2015
- Identification: IMO number: 8652201; MMSI number: 319085200; Callsign: ZGFA9
- Status: in active service

General characteristics
- Class & type: Kortenaer-class frigate
- Displacement: 3,500 long tons (3,600 t) standard; 3,800 long tons (3,900 t) full load
- Length: 130 m (426 ft 6 in)
- Beam: 14.4 m (47 ft 3 in)
- Draft: 4.4 m (14 ft 5 in)
- Propulsion: Combined gas or gas (COGOG) system: 2 × Rolls-Royce Tyne RM1C gas turbines, 4,900 shp (3,700 kW) each; 2 × Rolls-Royce Olympus TM3B gas turbines, 25,700 shp (19,200 kW) each (boost); 2 shafts
- Speed: 20 knots (37 km/h; 23 mph) cruise; 30 knots (56 km/h; 35 mph) maximum
- Endurance: 4,700 nautical miles at 16 knots (8,700 km at 30 km/h)
- Complement: 176–196
- Armament: 2 × OTO-Melara Compatto 76 mm/62 cal. gun; 2 × twin Mk46 torpedo tubes; 2 × quad RGM-84 Harpoon anti-ship missile launchers; 1 × 8-cell Sea Sparrow anti-aircraft missile launchers; 1 × Goalkeeper in Dutch service
- Aircraft carried: 2 × Sea Lynx helicopters (1 in peacetime)

HNLMS Piet Hein (F811) (Dutch: Hr.Ms. Piet Hein) was a frigate of the Kortenaer class. The ship was in service with the Royal Netherlands Navy from 1981 to 1998. The frigate was named after Dutch naval hero Piet Pieterszoon Hein. The ship's radio call sign was "PAVM".

== Dutch service history ==
HNLMS Piet Hein was built at KM de Schelde in Vlissingen. The keel laying took place on 28 April 1977 and the launching on 3 June 1978. The ship was put into service on 14 April 1981.

On 8 February 1982, the ship, with the frigates Tromp, Callenburgh, Van Speijk, the destroyer Overijssel and the replenishment ship Zuiderkruis, departed from Den Helder for a trip to the United States to show the flag and for 200 years diplomatic relations. The ships returned to Den Helder on 19 May 1982.

In 1998 the vessel was decommissioned and was sold to the United Arab Emirates Navy.

== United Arab Emirates service history ==
The ship was commissioned on 27 June 1998 to the United Arab Emirates Navy where the vessel was renamed Al Emirat. Al Emirat was decommissioned in 2008.

== Conversion to yacht ==
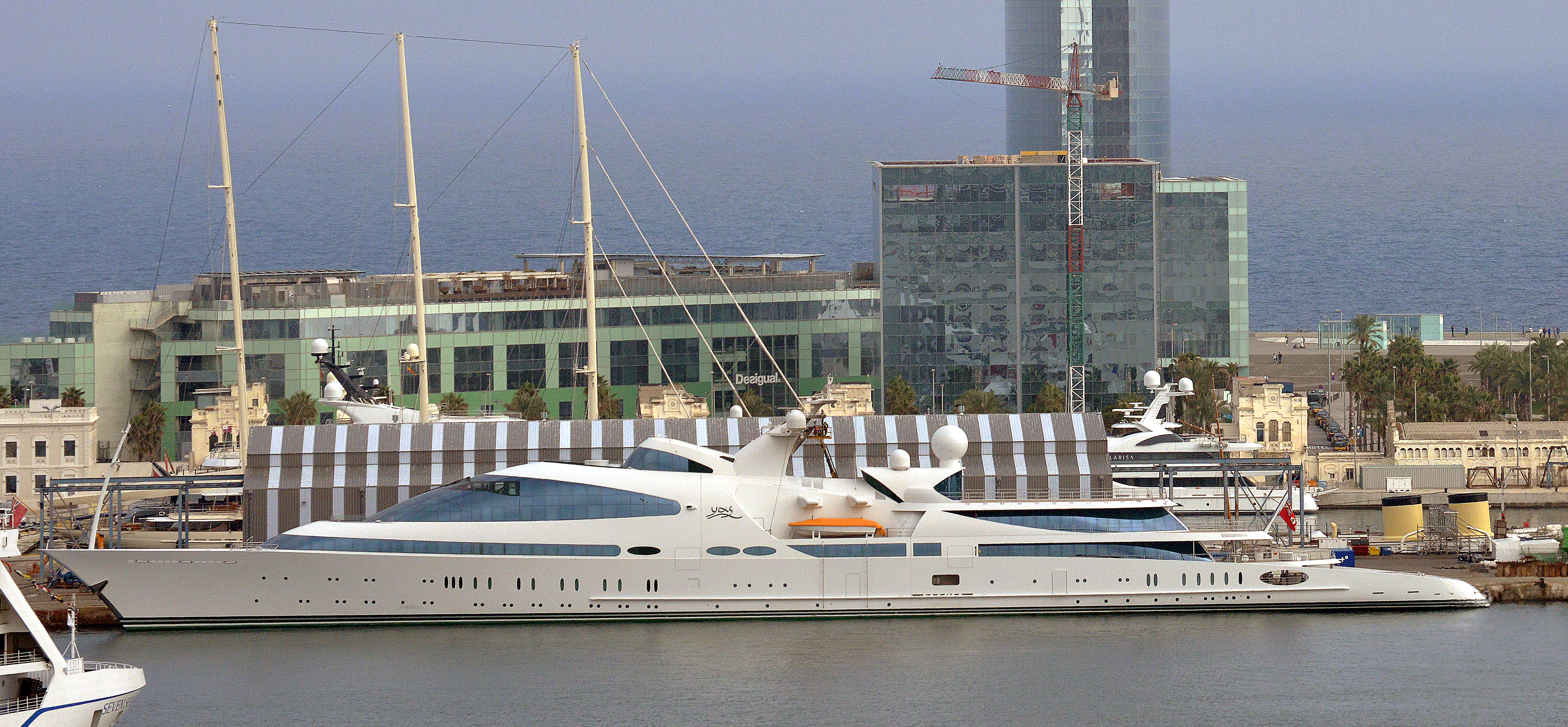
As Yas in Barcelona

Construction work started at ADMShipyards of Abu Dhabi in 2009 to rebuild the ship into a private superyacht named Yas. The ship was relaunched in 2011 and delivered in 2015. At 141 metres (463 ft) in length she is one of the largest motor yachts in the world.
