= Bankert =

Bankert is a surname. Notable people with the surname include:

- Judd Bankert (born 1949), American athlete
- Silvio Bankert (born 1985), German footballer

== See also ==
- Banckert
