= Greek frigate Limnos =

Greek Elli-class frigate

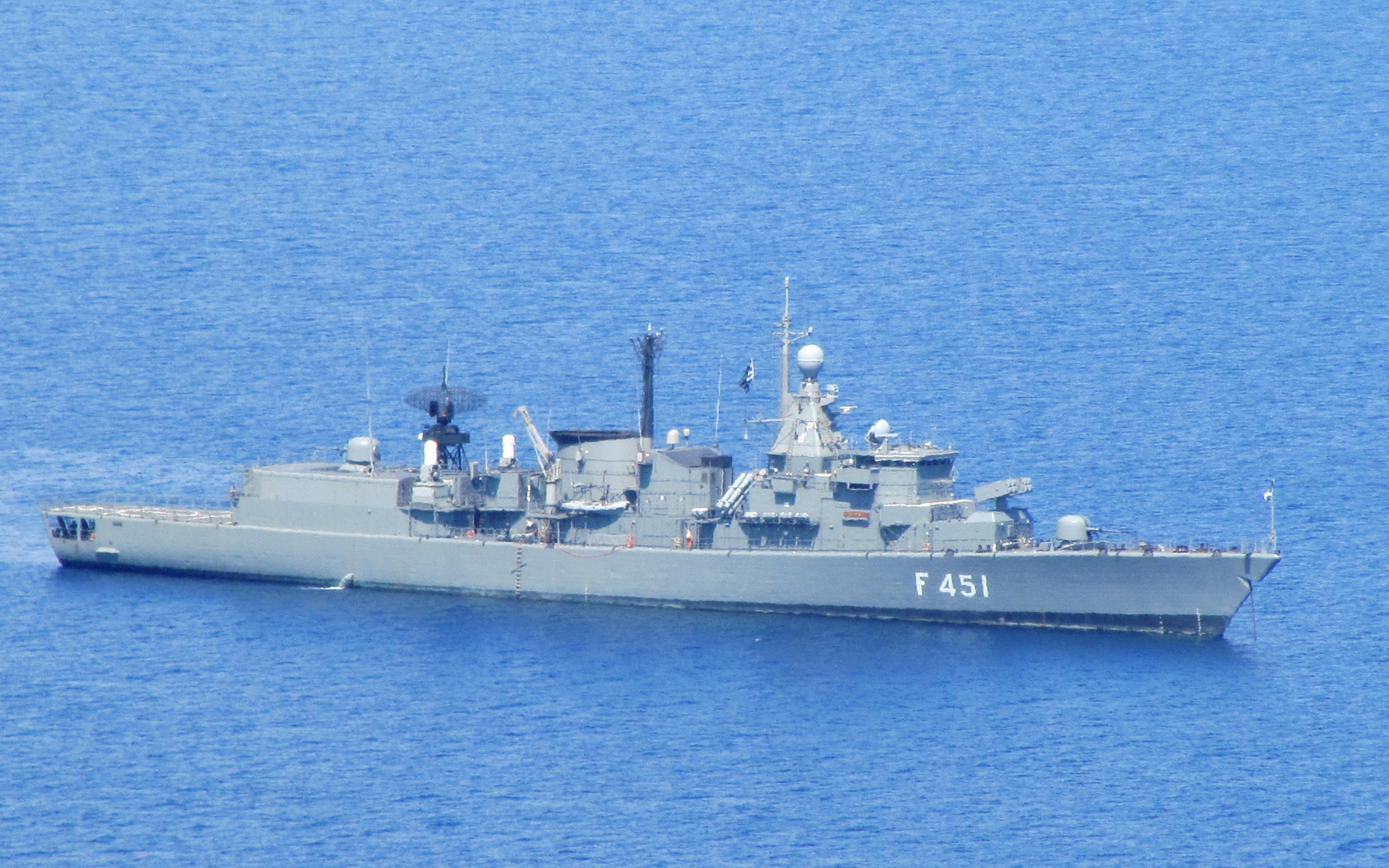

History

Greece
- Name: Limnos
- Namesake: Lemnos island and the Battle of Lemnos (1913)
- Laid down: 13 June 1978
- Launched: 27 October 1979
- Commissioned: 18 September 1982
- Status: In active service

General characteristics
- Class & type: Elli-class frigate
- Displacement: 3,500 tons (3,800 t max)
- Length: 130 m (426 ft 6 in)
- Beam: 14.6 m (47 ft 11 in)
- Draft: 6.2 m (20 ft 4 in)
- Propulsion: COGOG system: 2 Rolls-Royce Tyne RM1C gas turbines, 4,900 shp (3,700 kW) each; 2 Rolls-Royce Olympus TM3B gas turbines, 25,700 shp (19,200 kW) each (boost); 2 shafts
- Speed: 30 knots (56 km/h; 35 mph) maximum; 20 knots (37 km/h; 23 mph) cruise
- Complement: 196
- Armament: 2 × OTO Melara 76 mm/62 cal. gun; 2 × Mk15 Phalanx 20 mm CIWS; 2 Mk 141 4 × 8 Harpoon missile launchers; Mk 29 octuple launcher for 24 × RIM-7M SAMs; 2 Mk 32 2 × 324 mm torpedo tubes for Mk46 torpedoes
- Aircraft carried: 2 AB 212 ASW helicopter or 1 Sikorsky S-70B-6 Aegean Hawk

Limnos (F451) is an Elli-class frigate of the Hellenic Navy, and the third Greek warship to bear the name. The class is based on the Royal Netherlands Navy's Kortenaer class and was built in a Dutch shipyard; however, unlike later members of her class in the Hellenic Navy, she was not originally in Dutch service but was sold directly to Greece. Limnos was constructed in Vlissingen, Netherlands, along with her sister ship Elli. The contract for her construction was signed in Athens in July 1981, and her commissioning took place on 18 September 1982. After commissioning, Limnos joined the Hellenic Fleet on 5 November 1982, and, since then, she has actively participated in fleet operations.

== Service history ==
Limnos took part in several operations including Operation Desert Storm and Operation Desert Shield in 1990 and 1991. She was part of the security arrangements for the 2004 Summer Olympics in Athens as part of Operation Ifitos, and with Operation Ocean Shield, the NATO contribution to the anti-piracy initiative, in 2009. In 2011 she deployed with Operation Unified Protector, the NATO operation to enforce United Nations Security Council resolutions regarding the Libyan Civil War, and with Operation Active Endeavour, an anti-terrorism mission in the Mediterranean.

=== August 2020 collision with TCG Kemal Reis ===
On 13 August 2020, Turkish President Recep Tayyip Erdoğan announced that any attack on the Turkish research vessel Oruç Reis will incur a "high price" and suggested that Turkey had already acted on that warning. This came after unconfirmed reports that Limnos collided with the frigate Kemalreis, one of the ships of the Turkish Navy that were escorting Oruç Reis, which resumed drilling operations southeast of the Greek island of Kastellorizo on 10 August, after suspending its work in July.

On the following day, the Hellenic Ministry of National Defence released a date stamped photograph of Limnos conducting joint drills with four other Greek frigates and two units of the French Navy in that same area. According to unnamed "Greek defense sources", the Greek frigate manoeuvred to avoid a head-on collision, after Kemalreis attempted to "block" Limnos path and in the process its bow touched the rear of the Turkish frigate. Initially, the Turkish frigate's fate remained unconfirmed, despite reports that mentioned it was deemed non-operational due to propeller damage, requiring return to port for repairs. Later on the same day and in response however, the Turkish Ministry of Defense released a video of the ship in social media, declaring that Kemalreis was also fully operational and its condition was unchanged, normally continuing its original mission. As a response to the Turkish President's statements, the Greek Ministry of Foreign Affairs issued a statement, announcing that the Greek Foreign Minister would brief in detail his European counterparts on the operational and technical details of that incident.

On 19 August, Greek newspaper Kathimerini published a photograph depicting the damage sustained to the right side of the stern of the Turkish frigate during the collision. Several Turkish newspapers published a video showing Kemalreis was not damaged at the bow.

== Coat of arms ==
The coat of arms of the ship is a copy of the battleship Lemnos's coat of arms. It depicts the lyra of the ancient poet and kitharode Arion and dolphins in waves.
