= Greek frigate Elli =

Lead ship of the Elli-class frigates

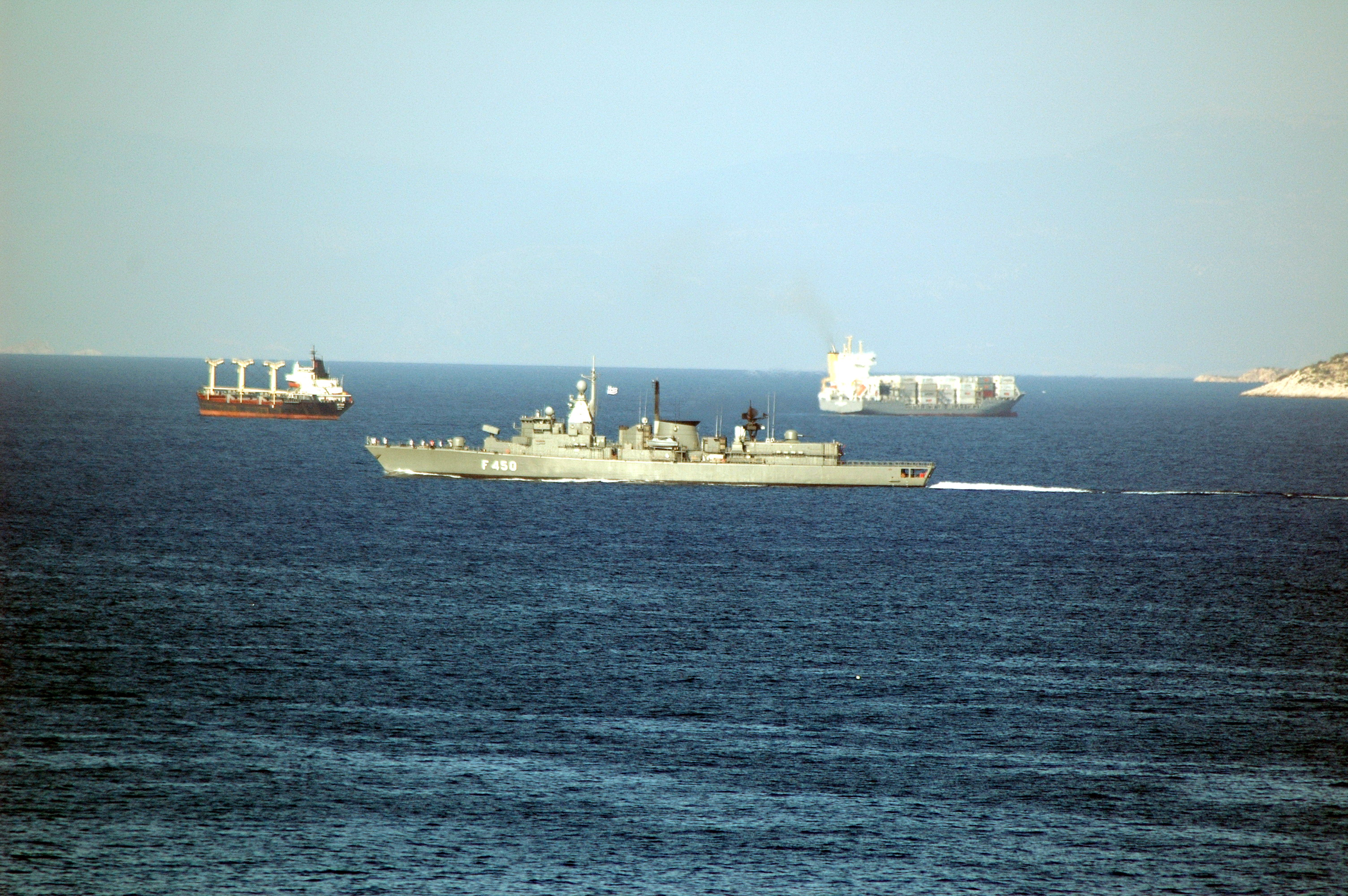
- Elli F-450

History

Greece
- Name: Elli
- Namesake: the Battle of Elli
- Builder: Koninklijke Maatschappij de Schelde, Vlissingen
- Launched: 10 October 1981
- Commissioned: 1982
- Status: in active service
- Notes: Official Hellenic Navy page

General characteristics
- Class & type: Elli-class frigate
- Displacement: 3,360 tons
- Length: 130.5 m (428 ft)
- Beam: 14.6 m (48 ft)
- Draft: 6.2 m (20 ft)
- Propulsion: COGOG system: 2 Rolls-Royce Tyne RM1C gas turbines, 4,900 shp each; 2 Rolls-Royce Olympus TM3B gas turbines, 25,700 shp each (boost); 2 shafts
- Speed: 30-knot (56 km/h) maximum; 20-knot (37 km/h) cruise
- Complement: 198
- Armament: 2 × OTO Melara 76 mm/62 cal., 2 × Mk15 Phalanx 20 mm CIWS, 2 Mk141 4 × 8 Harpoon missile launchers, Mk29 octuple launcher for 24 × RIM-7M SAMs, 2 Mk32 2 × 324mm T/T for Mk46 torpedoes
- Aircraft carried: 1 AB 212 ASW helicopter

Greek frigate Elli (F450) (Greek: Φ/Γ Έλλη) is the lead ship of the Greek Elli class of frigates, and the third Hellenic Navy ship by that name. It is named after the battle of Elli in which the hellenic navy defeated the Ottoman fleet. The class is based on the Royal Netherlands Navy's Kortenaer class and was built in a Dutch shipyard; however, unlike later members of its class in the Hellenic Navy, it was not originally in Dutch service but was sold directly to Greece.

The Elli was built at the Koninklijke Maatschappij de Schelde in Vlissingen, Holland, along with the frigate Limnos as part of a commission for the two ships from the Greek government. Her maiden voyage was on 10 October 1981 under her first captain, Grigoris Demestihas. She arrived in Greece on 15 November that year.

The Elli took part in the Persian Gulf War from 1990–91, enforcing the UN resolution on Iraq in the neighborhood of the Red Sea.

It was modernised in 2006.
