= HNLMS Abraham Crijnssen (F816) =

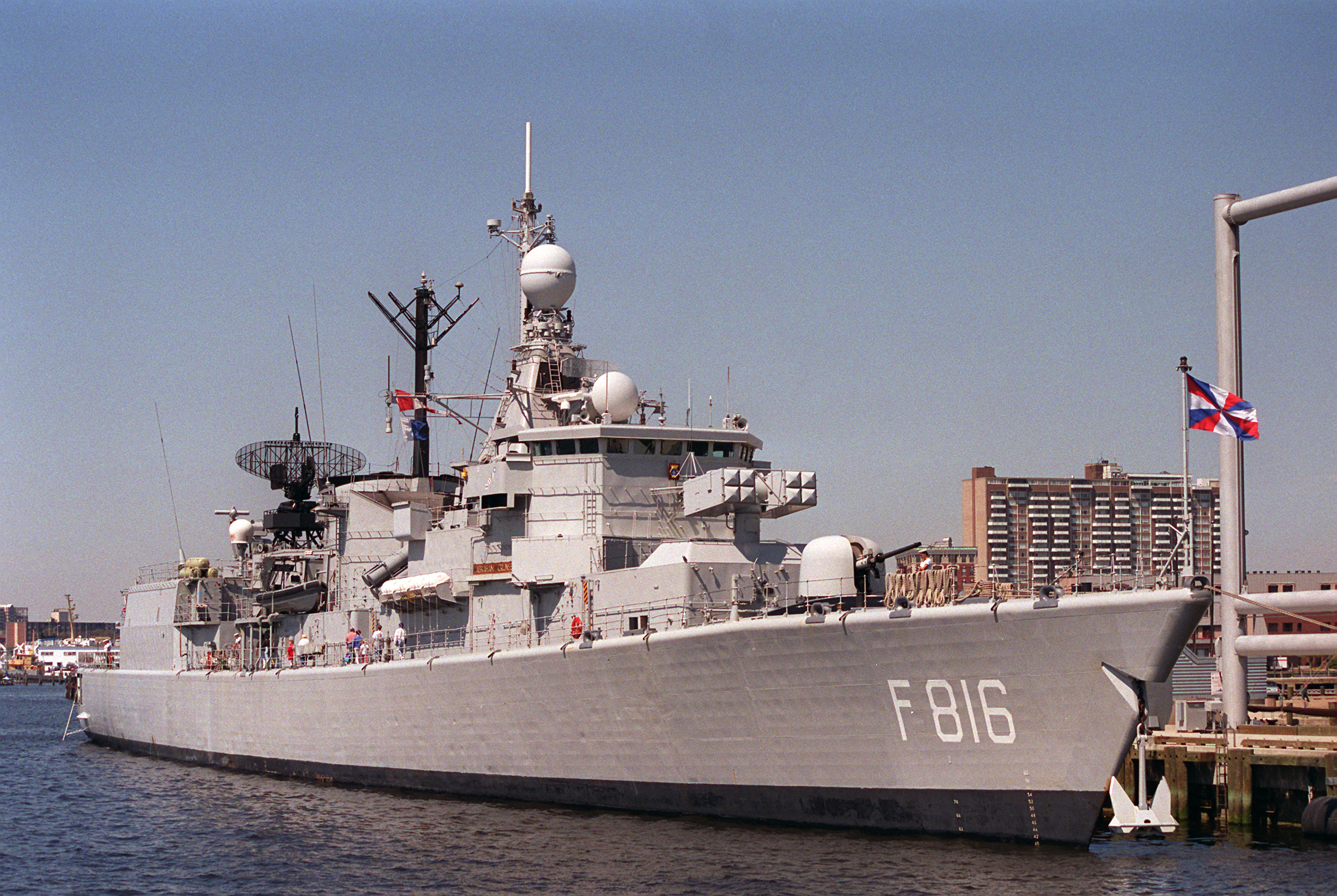
- Abraham Crijnssen

History

Netherlands
- Name: Abraham Crijnssen
- Namesake: Abraham Crijnssen
- Builder: KM de Schelde, Vlissingen
- Laid down: 25 October 1978
- Launched: 16 May 1981
- Commissioned: 6 January 1983
- Decommissioned: 1997
- Fate: Sold to the United Arab Emirates Navy

United Arab Emirates
- Name: Abu Dhabi
- Acquired: 31 October 1997
- Decommissioned: 2008
- Identification: F01

General characteristics
- Class & type: Kortenaer-class frigate
- Displacement: 3,500 long tons (3,600 t) standard; 3,800 long tons (3,900 t) full load
- Length: 130 m (426 ft 6 in)
- Beam: 14.4 m (47 ft 3 in)
- Draft: 4.4 m (14 ft 5 in)
- Propulsion: Combined gas or gas (COGOG) system: 2 × Rolls-Royce Tyne RM1C gas turbines, 4,900 shp (3,700 kW) each; 2 × Rolls-Royce Olympus TM3B gas turbines, 25,700 shp (19,200 kW) each (boost); 2 shafts
- Speed: 20 knots (37 km/h; 23 mph) cruise; 30 knots (56 km/h; 35 mph) maximum
- Endurance: 4,700 nautical miles at 16 knots (8,700 km at 30 km/h)
- Complement: 176–196
- Armament: 2 × OTO-Melara Compatto 76 mm/62 cal. gun; 2 × twin Mk46 torpedo tubes; 2 × quad RGM-84 Harpoon anti-ship missile launchers; 1 × 8-cell Sea Sparrow anti-aircraft missile launchers; 1 × Goalkeeper
- Aircraft carried: 2 × Sea Lynx helicopters (1 in peacetime)

HNLMS Abraham Crijnssen (F816) (Dutch: Hr.Ms. Abraham Crijnssen) was a frigate of the Kortenaer class. The ship was in service with the Royal Netherlands Navy from 1983 to 1997. The frigate was named after Dutch naval hero Abraham Crijnssen. The ship's radio call sign was "PAVX".

== Dutch service history ==
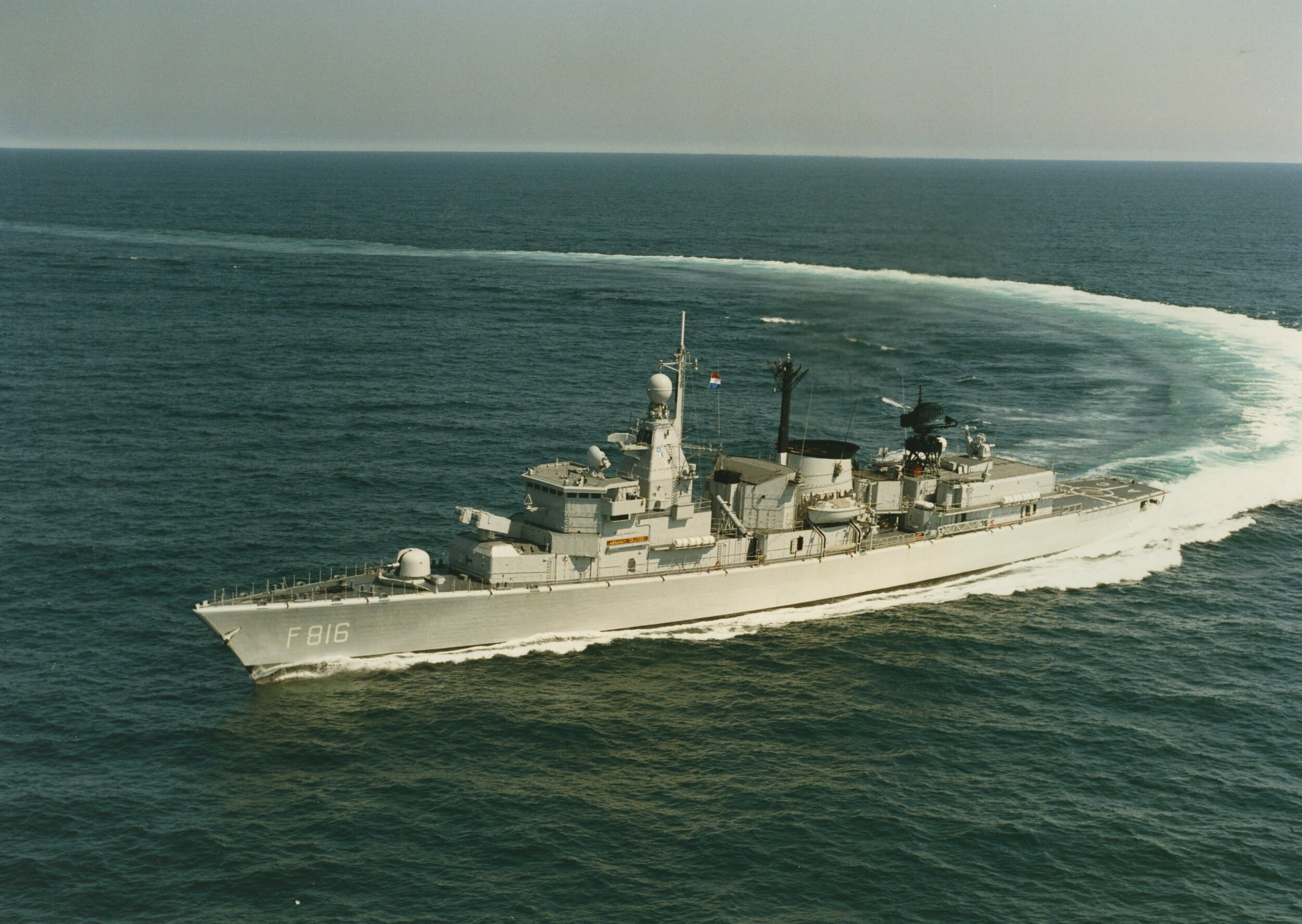
Abraham Crijnssen in 1989

HNLMS Abraham Crijnssen was built at KM de Schelde in Vlissingen. The keel laying took place on 25 October 1978 and the launching on 16 May 1981. The ship was put into service on 6 January 1983.

Abraham Crijnssen served as escort for the British aircraft carrier HMS Ark Royal during UNPROFOR in the Adriatic Sea in May 1993.

In June 1994 the ship participated in the BALTOPS 94 naval exercise with vessels from several other navies.

In 1997 the vessel was decommissioned and was sold to the United Arab Emirates Navy.

== United Arab Emirates service history ==
The ship was commissioned on 31 October 1997 to the United Arab Emirates Navy where the ship was renamed Abu Dhabi and decommissioned in 2008. Construction work started in 2009 to rebuild the ship into a yacht.
