= HNLMS Bloys van Treslong =

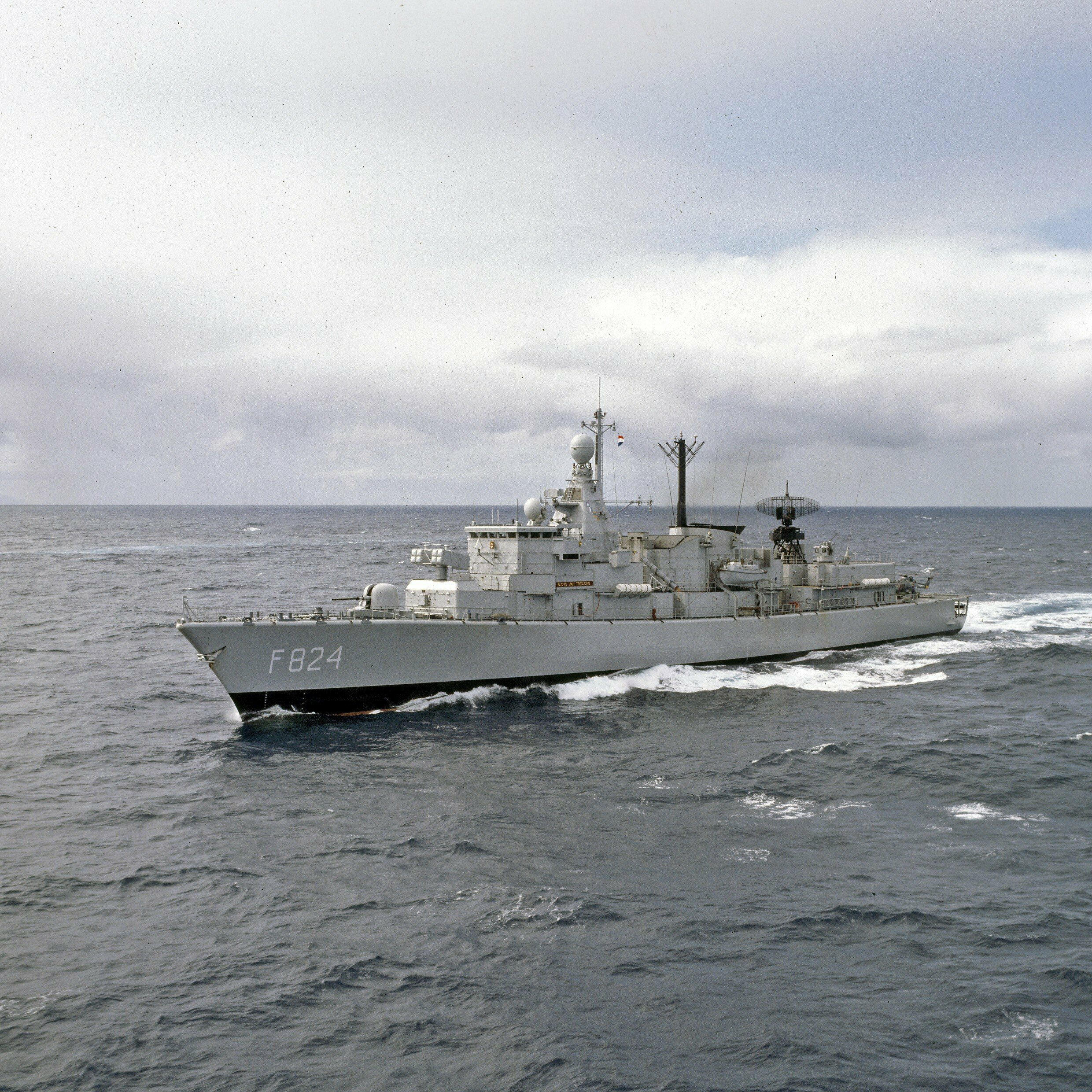
- HNLMS Bloys van Treslong

History

Netherlands
- Name: Bloys van Treslong
- Namesake: Willem Bloys van Treslong
- Builder: Wilton-Fijenoord, Schiedam
- Laid down: 5 May 1978
- Launched: 15 November 1980
- Commissioned: 25 November 1982
- Decommissioned: 2003
- Fate: Sold to the Hellenic Navy, 2003

Greece
- Name: Nikiforos Fokas
- Acquired: 2003
- Identification: F466
- Status: active service

General characteristics
- Class & type: Kortenaer-class frigate
- Displacement: 3,500 long tons (3,600 t) standard; 3,800 long tons (3,900 t) full load
- Length: 130 m (426 ft 6 in)
- Beam: 14.4 m (47 ft 3 in)
- Draft: 4.4 m (14 ft 5 in)
- Propulsion: Combined gas or gas (COGOG) system: 2 × Rolls-Royce Tyne RM1C gas turbines, 4,900 shp (3,700 kW) each; 2 × Rolls-Royce Olympus TM3B gas turbines, 25,700 shp (19,200 kW) each (boost); 2 shafts
- Speed: 20 knots (37 km/h; 23 mph) cruise; 30 knots (56 km/h; 35 mph) maximum
- Endurance: 4,700 nautical miles at 16 knots (8,700 km at 30 km/h)
- Complement: 176–196
- Armament: 2 × OTO-Melara Compatto 76 mm/62 cal. gun; 2 × twin Mk46 torpedo tubes; 2 × quad RGM-84 Harpoon anti-ship missile launchers; 1 × 8-cell Sea Sparrow anti-aircraft missile launchers; 1 × Goalkeeper in Dutch service; 1 × Phalanx in Greek service
- Aircraft carried: 2 × Sea Lynx helicopters (1 in peacetime)

HNLMS Bloys van Treslong (F824) (Dutch: Hr.Ms. Bloys van Treslong) was a frigate of the Kortenaer class. The ship was in service with the Royal Netherlands Navy from 1982-2003. She was named after Dutch naval hero Willem Bloys van Treslong, and the ship's radio call sign was "PADG".

== Dutch service history ==
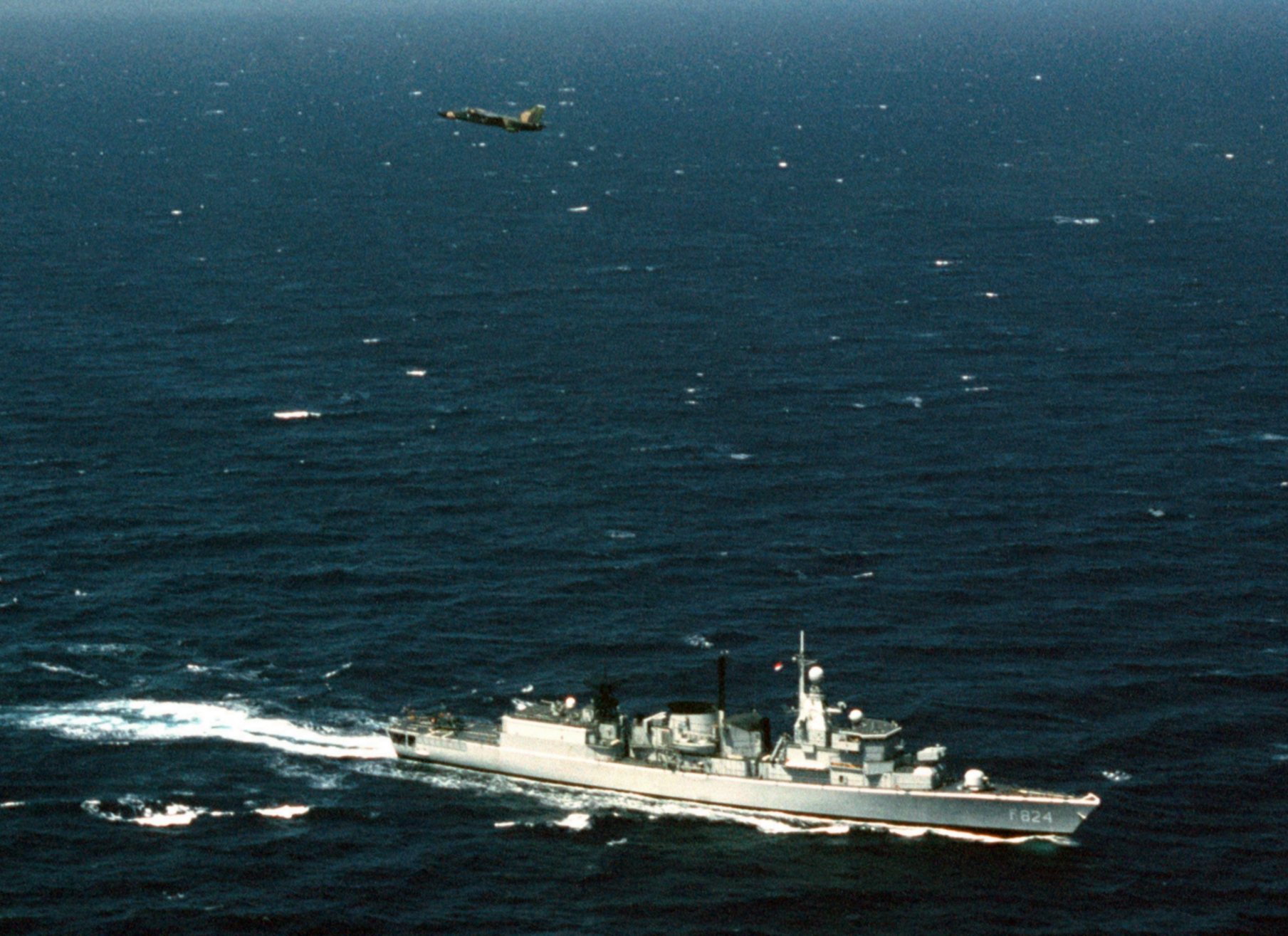
Bloys van Treslong off Gibraltar

HNLMS Bloys van Treslong was built at Wilton-Fijenoord in Schiedam. The keel laying took place on 5 May 1978, and she was launched on 15 November 1980. The ship was put into service on 25 November 1982.

In 1993, the ship served as station ship in the West Indies. During this period, she was sent to Haiti in support of the United Nations peace mission Support Democracy.

In 1996, she made a trip to Norway with the frigates Jacob van Heemskerck, Willem van der Zaan, Tromp, and the replenishment ship Amsterdam.

In 2003, the vessel was decommissioned and sold to the Hellenic Navy.

== Greek service history ==
The ship was transferred in 2003 to the Hellenic Navy where she was renamed Nikiforos Fokas using the radio call sign "SZCH".
