= Willem Bloys van Treslong =

Dutch nobleman (1529–1594)

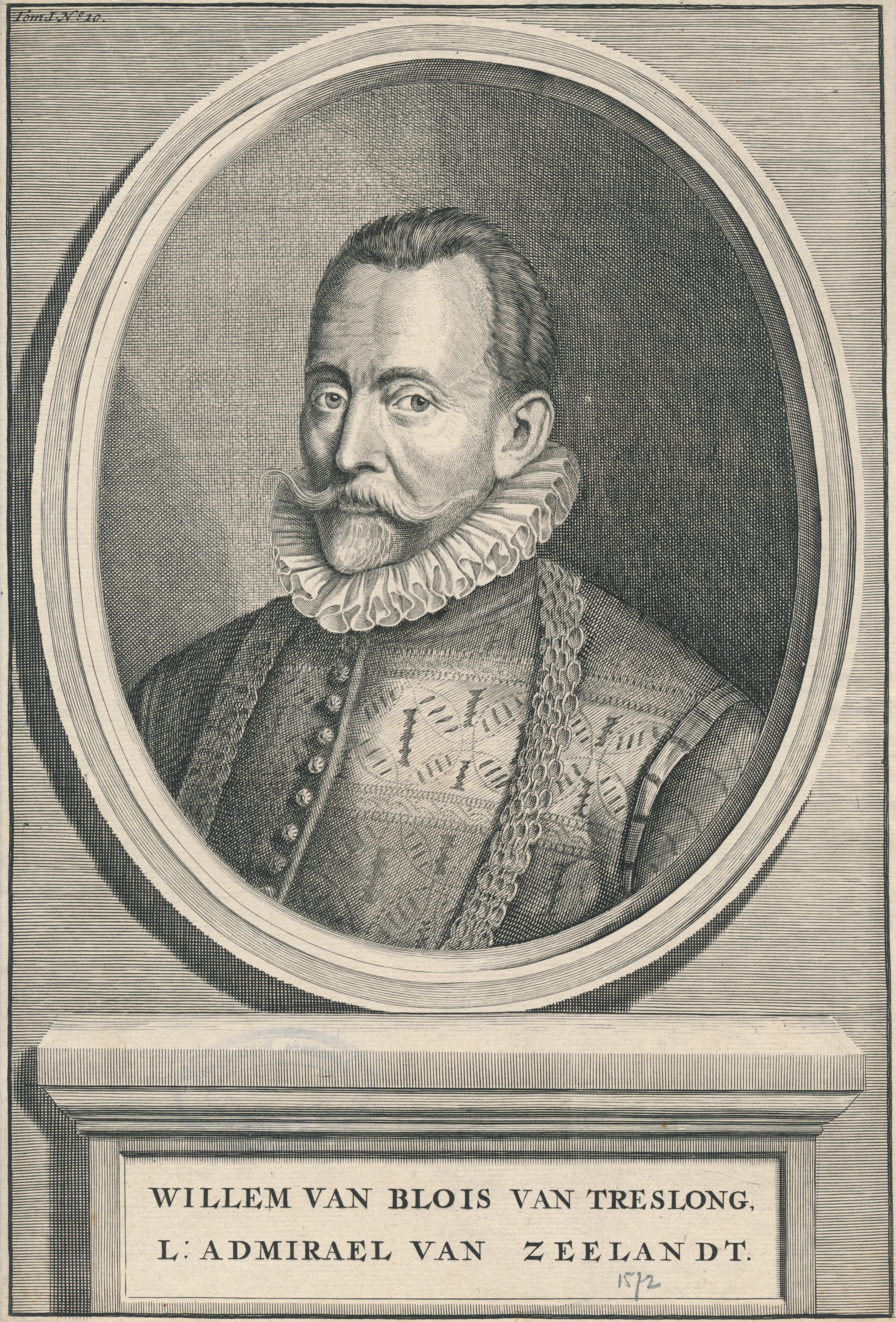
Willem van Blois van Treslong, l'admirael van Zeelandt

Willem Bloys van Treslong (1529 – 17 July 1594) was a nobleman from the Southern Netherlands and military leader during the Dutch war of Independence. He was best known as one of the leaders of the Sea Beggars who captured Den Briel on 1 April 1572.

== Biography ==
The Bloys van Treslong family owned land in Flanders, Hainaut and Holland. They were descended from John of Beaumont.

Bloys van Treslong left Spanish service in 1558. In 1567, he joined other high nobles of the Netherlands in refusing to pledge allegiance to Margaret of Parma, the governor of the Netherlands, and he was part of the Compromise of Nobles. He fought in the battle of Heiligerlee in 1568. In 1571, William the Silent provided him with letters of marque and equipped two ships to join the Sea Beggars.

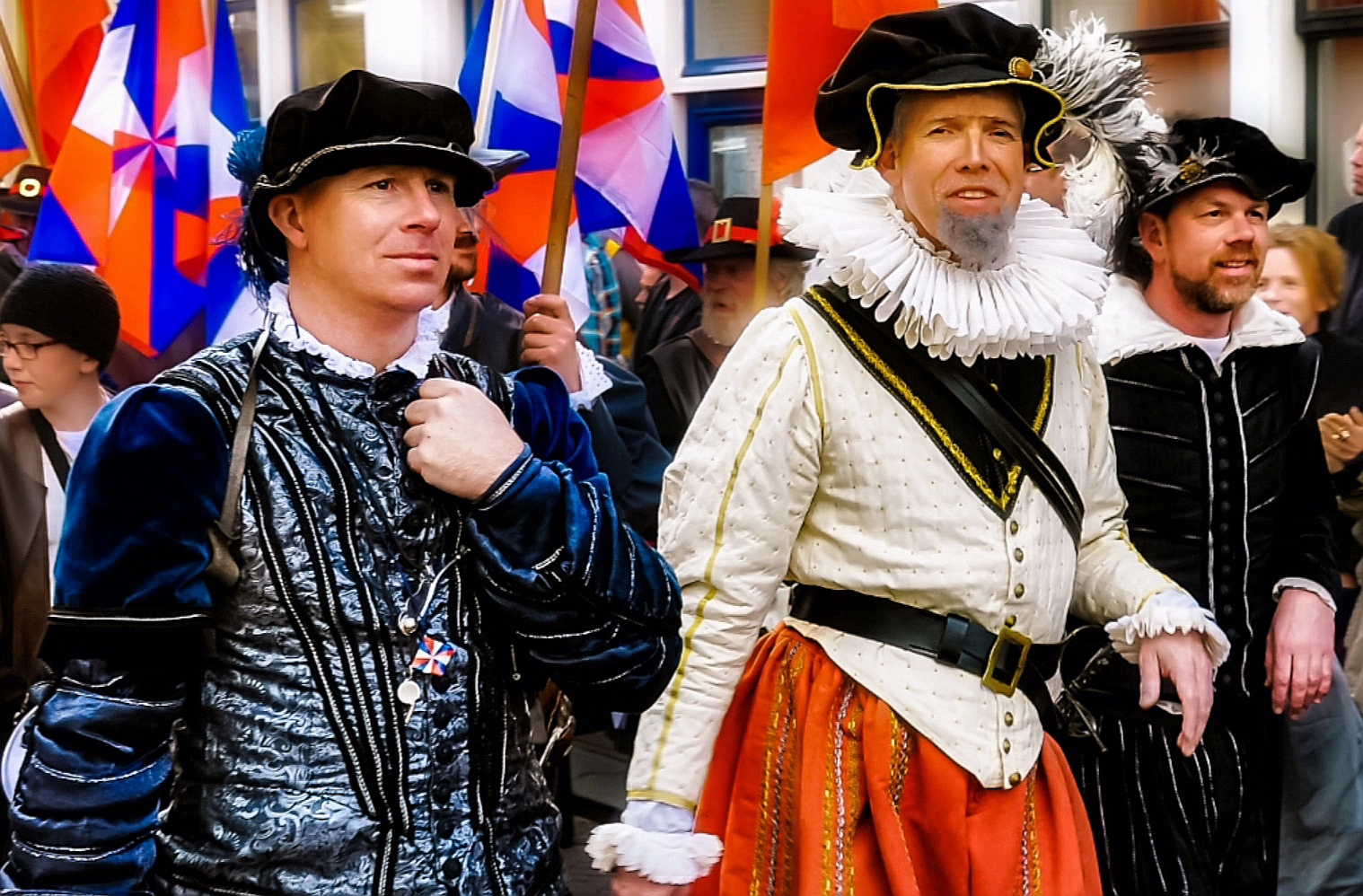
Historic parade in Den Briel to celebrate the 540th anniversary of the Capture of Brielle on April 1, 2012. The leaders of the sea beggars, William II de La Marck, Lord Lumey (middle), Willem Bloys van Treslong (left) and Lenaert Jansz de Graeff (right).

In March 1572, Bloys van Treslong's ships were trapped by ice at Wieringen and were attacked by four Spanish companies of infantry. Bloys escaped from the Spaniards, but lost his sword which at present hangs in the Michaëlskerk church in Oosterland. In April 1572, the Sea Beggars, under the command of William van der Marck, Lord of Lumey and his captains Lenaert Jansz de Graeff and Bloys van Treslong, captured Briel, which became a rebel base. Later that year, the rebels captured Flushing.

Bloys van Treslong was appointed Admiral of Holland in 1573, followed by his appointment as Admiral of Zealand in 1576. After a dispute over the strategy for the relief of Antwerp in 1585, he fell out of favour and ended up in jail, believed to have been under the custody of Count Steijn. In his last years, he became bailiff of Voorne and grand-falconer of Holland and lived in relative peace.

Bloys van Treslong was married to Adriana van Egmond and Wilhelmina Kaarl. By Adriana van Egmond, he had a son, Jasper.

The Dutch warship HNLMS Bloys van Treslong was named after him.
