= HNLMS Callenburgh =

1977 Kortenaer-class frigate

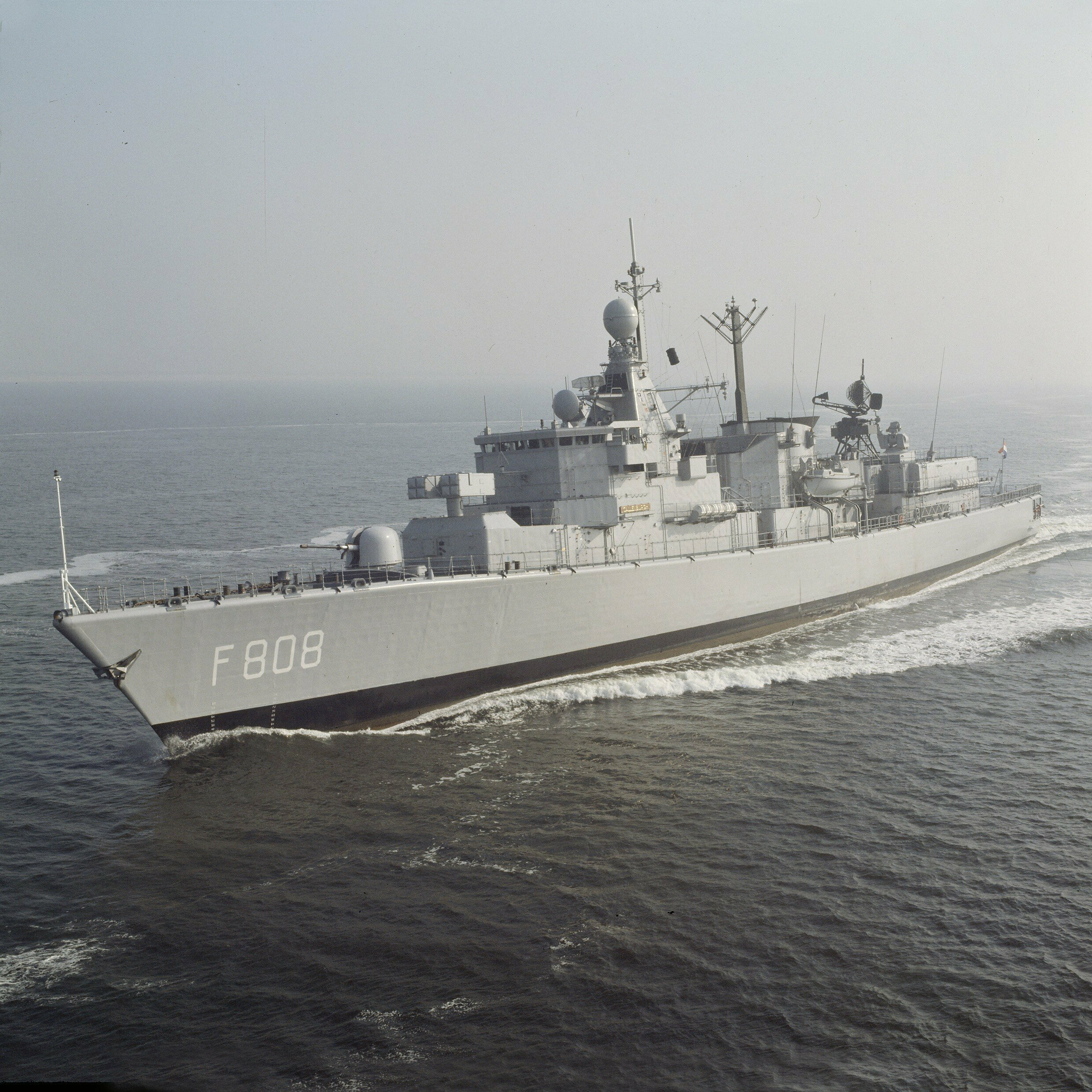

History

Netherlands
- Name: Callenburgh
- Namesake: Gerard Callenburgh
- Ordered: 1974
- Builder: KM de Schelde, Vlissingen
- Laid down: 30 June 1975
- Launched: 26 March 1977
- Commissioned: 26 July 1979
- Decommissioned: 1994
- Fate: Sold to the Hellenic Navy, 30 March 1994
- Notes: Pennant number F 808

Greece
- Name: Adrias
- Acquired: 30 March 1994
- Commissioned: 30 June 1995
- Identification: F 459
- Status: Active service

General characteristics
- Class & type: Kortenaer-class frigate
- Displacement: 3,500 long tons (3,600 t) standard; 3,800 long tons (3,900 t) full load
- Length: 130 m (426 ft 6 in)
- Beam: 14.4 m (47 ft 3 in)
- Draft: 4.4 m (14 ft 5 in)
- Propulsion: Combined gas or gas (COGOG) system: 2 × Rolls-Royce Tyne RM1C gas turbines, 4,900 shp (3,700 kW) each; 2 × Rolls-Royce Olympus TM3B gas turbines, 25,700 shp (19,200 kW) each (boost); 2 shafts
- Speed: 20 knots (37 km/h; 23 mph) cruise; 30 knots (56 km/h; 35 mph) maximum
- Endurance: 4,700 nautical miles at 16 knots (8,700 km at 30 km/h)
- Complement: 176–196
- Armament: 2 × OTO-Melara Compatto 76 mm/62 cal. gun; 2 × twin Mk46 torpedo tubes; 2 × quad RGM-84 Harpoon anti-ship missile launchers; 1 × 8-cell Sea Sparrow anti-aircraft missile launchers; 1 × Goalkeeper in Dutch service; 1 × Phalanx in Greek service
- Aircraft carried: 2 × Sea Lynx helicopters (1 in peacetime)

HNLMS Callenburgh (F808) (Dutch: Hr.Ms. Callenburgh) was a frigate of the Kortenaer class. The ship was in service with the Royal Netherlands Navy from 1979–1994. She was named after Dutch naval hero Gerard Callenburgh, and the ship's radio call sign was "PADB".

== Design and construction ==
In the early 1970s, the Royal Netherlands Navy developed a 'Standard' frigate design to replace the destroyers of the Holland- and Friesland classes. The 'Standard' design would have anti-submarine (the Kortenaer class) and anti-aircraft (the Jacob van Heemskerck-class) variants with different armaments on a common hull design. The first eight Kortenaers were ordered in 1974, with four more ordered in 1976, although two were sold to Greece while being built, and replaced to two of the anti-aircraft variant.

The Kortenaer's were 130.2 metres (427 ft 2 in) long overall and 121.8 metres (400 ft) between perpendiculars, with a beam) of 14.4 metres (47 ft 3 in) and a draft of 4.4 metres (14 ft 5 in). Displacement was 3,000 long tons (3,050 t) standard and 3,785 long tons (3,846 t) full load. The ship was powered by two 25,800 shaft horsepower (19,200 kW) Rolls-Royce Olympus TM 3B and two 4,900 shaft horsepower (3,700 kW) Rolls-Royce Tyne TM 1C gas turbines in a combined gas or gas (COGOG) arrangement, driving two propeller shafts. The Olympus engines gave a speed of 30 knots (35 mph; 56 km/h), and the Tyne cruise engines gave a speed of 20 knots (23 mph; 37 km/h).

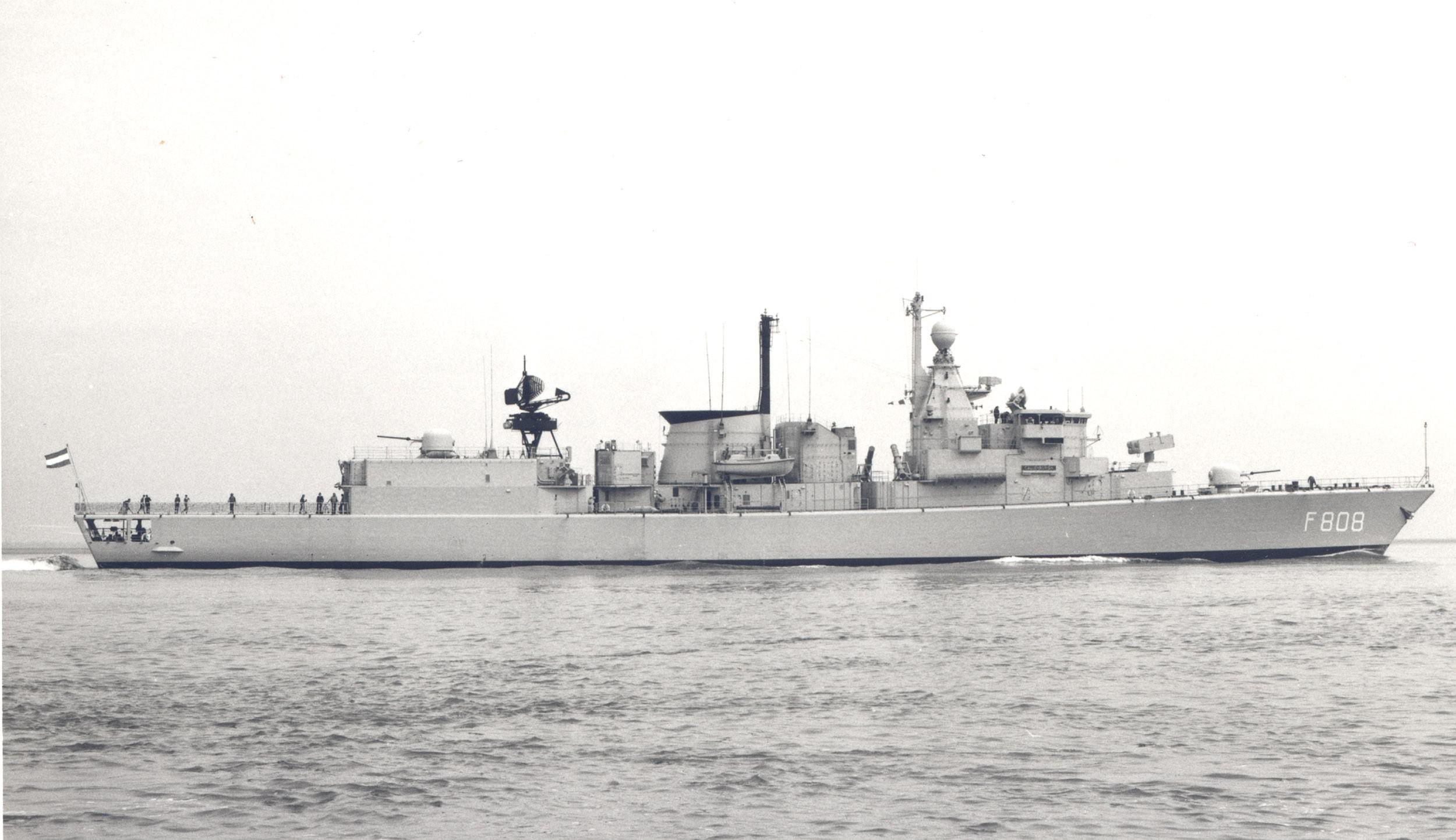
Callenburgh at sea

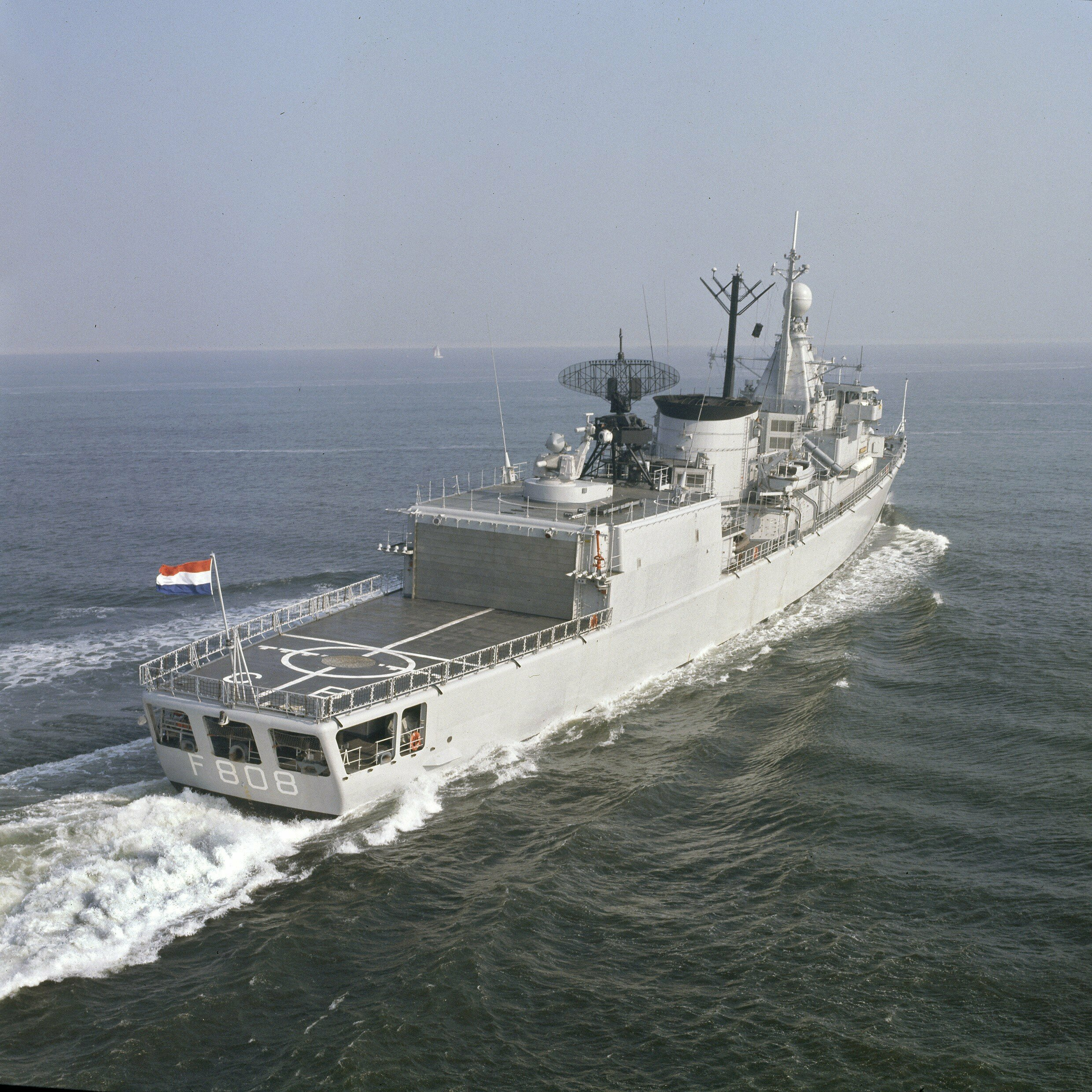
Callenburgh was equipped with a Goalkeeper CIWS station in 1984 which replaced her rear-moounted 76 mm gun.

Callenburgh's main anti-aircraft armament was an 8-round NATO Sea Sparrow surface-to-air missile launcher in front of the bridge. An OTO Melara 76 mm was fitted forward of the Sea Sparrow launcher, while a Goalkeeper CIWS was planned to be fitted aft, on the roof of the ship's hangar. Goalkeeper was not available when the ships were built, however, and Callenburgh was completed with a second Oto Melara 76 mm gun in its place. Eight Harpoon anti-ship missiles could be carried in two quadruple launchers, although two or four Harpoons was a more normal peacetime load-out. A hangar and fight deck were fitted to accommodate two Westland Lynx helicopters, although only one was normally carried. Close-in anti submarine armament was provided by four 324 mm tubes for US Mark 46 torpedoes. A Signaal LW-08 long-range air search radar was fitted, together with a ZW-06 surface-search radar, with WM-25 and STIR-180 fire control radars to direct the ship's armament. A Canadian SQS-505 hull-mounted sonar was fitted.

Callenburgh's aft Oto Melara 76 mm gun was replaced by a Bofors 40 mm anti-aircraft gun in 1982, and this, in turn, was replaced by a prototype Goalkeeper installation in September 1984. On transfer to Greece, the Goalkeeper was removed. Greece replaced it by an American Phalanx CIWS, while Agusta-Bell AB 212 helicopters replaced the Lynxes.

HNLMS Callenburgh was laid down at the Koninklijke Maatschappij De Schelde (KM de Schelde) shipyard in Vlissingen on 30 June 1975. She was launched on 26 March 1977 and commissioned into service on 26 July 1979 with the Pennant number F 808.

== Dutch service history ==
Callenburgh, with the frigates De Ruyter, Jan van Brakel, Van Kinsbergen, and the replenishment ship Poolster departed from Den Helder on 13 January 1986 for a trip to the Far East to show the flag and promote Dutch trade. The ships returned on 19 June.

On 8 February 1982, the ship, together with the frigates Tromp, Van Speijk, Piet Hein, the destroyer Overijssel, and the replenishment ship Zuiderkruis, departed from Den Helder for a trip to the United States to show the flag and to celebrate 200 years of diplomatic relations. The ships returned to Den Helder on 19 May 1982.

== Greek service history ==
The ship was sold to the Hellenic Navy on 30 March 1994, and commissioned under the name Adrias and with the pennant number F 459 on 30 June 1995. She was assigned the radio call sign "SZDT".

On 21 February 2021, USS Porter conducted an exercise with Adrias and 4 F-16s off southern Crete.
