= Kortenaer-class frigate =

Dutch naval ship class

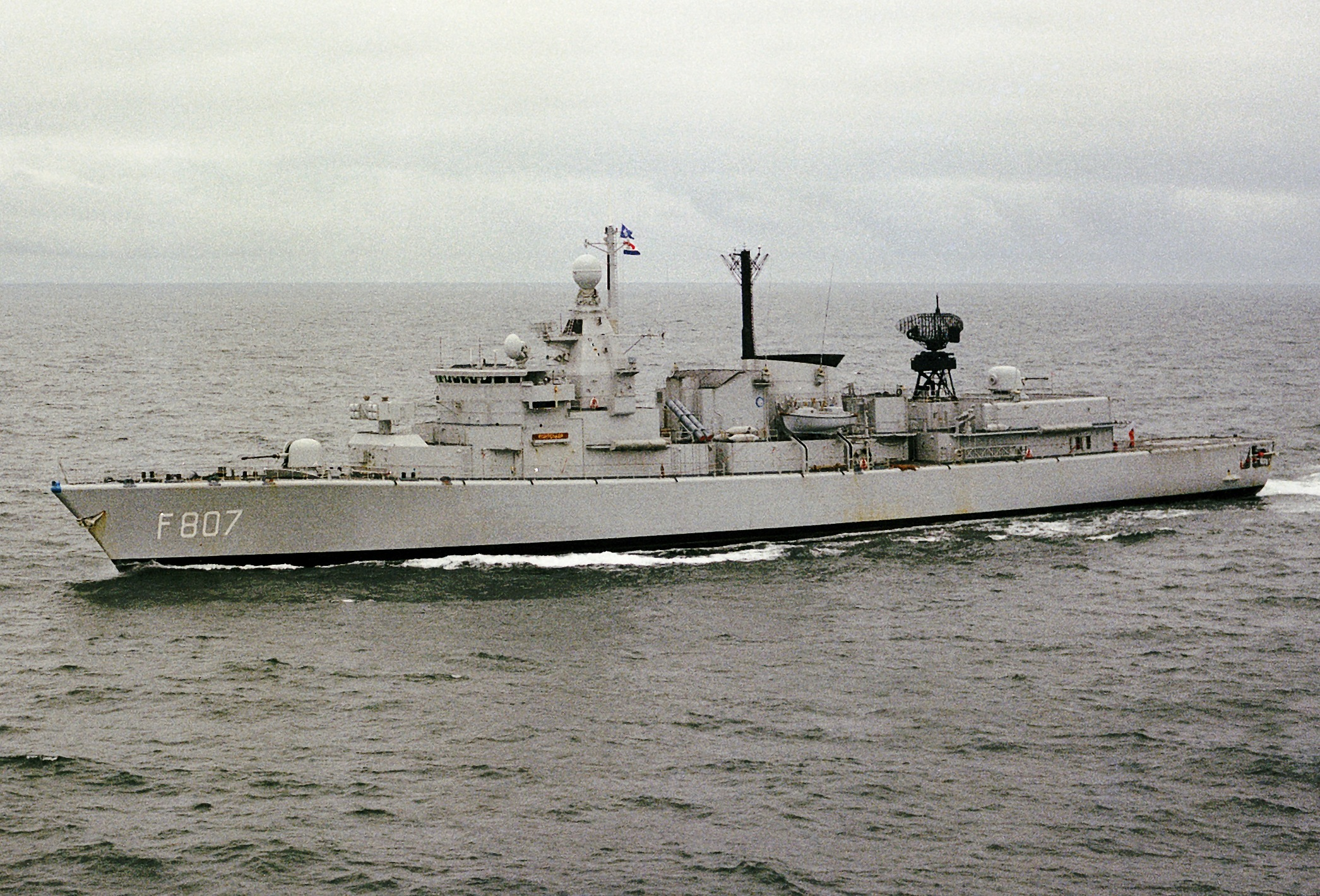
- Kortenaer

Class overview
- Name: Kortenaer class
- Operators: Royal Netherlands Navy; Hellenic Navy; United Arab Emirates Navy
- Preceded by: Holland class; Friesland class
- Succeeded by: Karel Doorman class
- Subclasses: Jacob van Heemskerck class; Elli class
- Built: 1975–1982
- In commission: 1978–present
- Planned: 12
- Completed: 12
- Active: 10
- Laid up: 1
- Retired: 1

General characteristics as built
- Type: Frigate
- Displacement: 3,100 t (3,050 long tons) standard; 3,690 t (3,630 long tons) full load
- Length: 130.5 m (428 ft 2 in)
- Beam: 14.6 m (47 ft 11 in)
- Draught: 4.3 m (14 ft 1 in)
- Propulsion: Combined gas or gas (COGOG) system: 2 × Rolls-Royce Tyne RM1C gas turbines, 4,900 shp (3,700 kW) each; 2 × Rolls-Royce Olympus TM3B gas turbines, 25,700 shp (19,200 kW) each (boost); 2 shafts
- Speed: 20 knots (37 km/h; 23 mph) cruise; 30 knots (56 km/h; 35 mph) maximum
- Endurance: 4,700 nautical miles at 16 knots (8,700 km; 5,400 mi at 30 km/h; 18 mph)
- Complement: 176–196
- Armament: 1 × OTO-Melara Compatto 76 mm/62 cal. gun; 1 × Bofors 40 mm gun; 2 × twin Mk46 torpedo tubes; 2 × quad RGM-84 Harpoon anti-ship missile launchers; 1 × 8-cell Sea Sparrow anti-aircraft missile launchers
- Aircraft carried: 2 × Sea Lynx helicopters

The Kortenaer class was a class of anti-submarine frigates of the Royal Netherlands Navy. Like other frigate types of the 1970s and 1980s, they featured a COGOG (combined gas or gas) propulsion system with separate cruise and sprint gas turbines. The Kortenaer-class frigates replaced the anti-submarine destroyers of the Holland and Friesland classes. Ten were built by De Schelde in Vlissingen and two by Wilton-Fijenoord in Schiedam between 1978 and 1982. Only ten served with the Royal Netherlands Navy: two were sold to Greece's Navy while still under construction and replaced by two Jacob van Heemskerck-class frigates which were an air defence variant of the Kortenaer class. The Greek frigates were renamed the Elli class. After service with the Dutch ended, eight of the frigates were sold to Greece in 1992 and the remaining two to the United Arab Emirates. Three of the ships have since been retired from active military service with one converted into the superyacht Yas.

== Background ==
The Kortenaer class was designed as an anti-submarine warfare (ASW) frigate intended to replace the two ASW classes (Holland and Friesland classes) already in service with the Royal Netherlands Navy. The Dutch planning committee intended for the class to have the maximum number of NATO compatible systems to other NATO frigate classes, even offering to enter in agreements with other navies, such as the British Royal Navy. These offers were rejected and instead the Dutch designed a standard platform, later referred to as the "Standard design", that would allow for ASW and anti-aircraft warfare (AAW) variants, while conforming to NATO standards.

== Design and description ==
The design's hull form was similar to contemporary French designs with continuous upper and main decks, a single rudder and a clipper bow. The frigates were designed to operate smoothly in seaways with reduced length-to-beam ratio than usual for ships of their size. Furthermore, the ships would have a higher degree of automation to reduce the engine room complement requirement and overall crew size, with the frigates being able to be operated and fought from the operations room. The Kortenaer class as built were 130.5 metres (428 ft 2 in) long overall with a beam of 14.6 m (47 ft 11 in) and a draught of 4.3 m (14 ft 1 in) at the hull and 6.2 m (20 ft 4 in) at the base of the propeller. As built the frigates had a standard displacement of 3,100 tonnes (3,050 long tons) and 3,690 t (3,630 long tons) at full load. With varying gun and radar compositions of the ships over their careers, the displacement would later differ among the class. Due to the high amount of automation within the ship, the complement was reduced from 196 to 176 officers and sailors.

The Kortenaer class sported 15 watertight bulkheads. The vessels were powered by a combined gas or gas (COGOG) system incorporating two Rolls-Royce Tyne RM1C gas turbines creating 3,700 kilowatts (4,900 shp) each and Rolls-Royce Olympus TM3B gas turbines creating 19,200 kW (25,700 shp) each. These drove two controllable pitch propellers giving the ships a maximum speed of 30 knots (56 km/h; 35 mph) and a cruising speed of 20 knots (37 km/h; 23 mph). The vessels had a range of 4,700 nautical miles (8,700 km; 5,400 mi) at 16 knots (30 km/h; 18 mph) while using a single Tyne turbine. Electricity was provided by four SEMT-Pielstick PA4 750 kW diesel generators. The vessels also had redundancy in their design, being equipped with two auxiliary boilers and evaporators. The engineering plant was spread over four compartments. Moving forward to aft the plant was situated as follows; auxiliaries, Olympus turbines, Tyne turbines and reduction gear, and auxiliaries. To increase stability, the vessels mounted a pair of Denny–Brown fin stabilizers.

The design originally called for the installation of two OTO Melara 76-millimetre (3 in)/62 calibre naval guns in single mounts, with one placed forward and one mounted atop the hangar aft. However, after the first four ships, the aft 76 mm gun was swapped out for a Bofors 40 mm (1.6 in)/L70 calibre anti-aircraft (AA) gun. The 76 mm guns could fire a 6 kg (13 lb) shell to a range of 8.6 nmi (15.9 km; 9.9 mi) at 85 degrees elevation. The aft guns were later replaced in all ships with a single-mounted, seven-barreled SGE-30 Goalkeeper 30 mm (1.2 in) close-in weapons system (CIWS) that had a range of 2 km (1.2 mi).

Each of the vessels were mounted with two quad launchers for Harpoon anti-ship missiles, each missile was capable of travelling 70 nmi (130 km; 81 mi) at Mach 0.9 carrying a 227 kg (500 lb) warhead. They were also armed with a Mark 29 octuple launcher for the Sea Sparrow AA missile and could carry up to 24 missiles. The Sea Sparrow had a range of 8 nmi (15 km; 9.2 mi) at a speed of Mach 2.5 with a 30 kg (66 lb) warhead. Additionally the frigates were equipped with two twin-mounted Mk 32 324 mm (13 in) torpedo tubes for Mk 46 Mod 5 torpedoes that had a range of 5.9 nmi (10.9 km; 6.8 mi) at 40 knots (74 km/h; 46 mph) with a 44 kg (97 lb) warhead.

The Kortenaer class was initially equipped with a Knebworth/Corvus rocket-launched chaff system, replaced by SRBOC six-tubed chaff launchers. They sported an ESM/ECM Ramses jammer and a SEWACO II action data system. They utilised LW 08 air search radar operating on the D band, ZW 06 surface search radar operating on the I band and STIR and WM 25 fire control radars operating on the I/J bands. For ASW purposes, the frigates had bow-mounted SQS-505, SQS-509 sonar or SQR-19 TACTASS towed sonar. The Kortenaer class had a flight deck and hangar at the stern of the ship that was initially capable of operating up to two Westland SH-14B Lynx helicopters, but normally carried only one during peacetime operations.

== Construction and service ==
The Dutch Government ordered the first batch of four ships on 31 August 1974. This was followed by a second batch of four on 28 November 1974 and a third batch of four on 29 December 1976. The first eight ships were all constructed by Royal Schelde. The ninth and tenth ships were built by Wilton-Fijenoord, and the final two ships were constructed by Royal Schelde. A contract was signed on 15 September 1980 with Greece for the sale of one the hulls under construction and the option for one more, which was taken up on 7 June 1981. These turned into hulls six and seven of the second batch (Peter Florisz and Witte de With). The remaining Kortenaer-class ships were initially used to patrol areas of the Atlantic Ocean until the 1990s, when their operations were shifted to the Mediterranean Sea and Strait of Hormuz. This was highlighted by NATO deployments in support of blockade operations during the Yugoslav Wars and operations in the Strait of Hormuz and Persian Gulf during the Gulf War. In 1993, Bloys van Treslong was sent west to the Caribbean Sea to enforce a United Nations blockade of Haiti. In 2001, the Kortenaers saw one last mission in Dutch service, with Philips van Almonde deploying to the Persian Gulf as part of Operation Enduring Freedom. However, budget cuts to the military began and forced the early retirement of the class from Dutch service.

On 9 November 1992, Greece signed an agreement to acquire more ships of the class, with the initial group totalling three. Banckert, Callenburgh and Van Kinsbergen were the first three to be sold. This was followed by Kortenaer, the second Peter Florisz, Jan van Brakel, Philips van Almonde and Bloys van Treslong. The remaining two frigates were transferred to the United Arab Emirates in a contract signed on 2 April 1996 following a refit at Royal Schelde.

== Ships in the class ==
The ships were named after Dutch captains and admirals:

Kortenaer class construction data
Ship	Pennant No.	Named after	Builder	Laid down	Launched	Commissioned	Decommissioned	Fate
Kortenaer	F807	Egbert Bartholomeusz Kortenaer	Royal Schelde	8 April 1975	18 December 1976	26 October 1978	1997	Sold to Greece
Callenburgh	F808	Gerard Callenburgh	Royal Schelde	2 September 1975	26 March 1977	26 July 1979	1994	Sold to Greece
Van Kinsbergen	F809	Jan Hendrik van Kinsbergen	Royal Schelde	2 September 1975	16 April 1977	24 April 1980	1995	Sold to Greece
Banckert	F810	Joost Banckert	Royal Schelde	25 February 1976	30 September 1978	29 October 1980	1993	Sold to Greece
Piet Hein	F811	Piet Pieterszoon Hein	Royal Schelde	28 April 1977	3 June 1978	14 April 1981	1998	Sold to United Arab Emirates
Peter Florisz	F812	Pieter Florisse	Royal Schelde	2 July 1977	15 December 1979	—N/a	—N/a	Sold to Greece in 1982
Witte de With	F813	Witte de With	Royal Schelde	13 June 1978	27 October 1979	—N/a	—N/a	Sold to Greece in 1982
Abraham Crijnssen	F816	Abraham Crijnssen	Royal Schelde	25 October 1978	16 May 1981	6 January 1983	1997	Sold to United Arab Emirates
Philips van Almonde	F823	Philips van Almonde	Wilton-Fijenoord	1 October 1977	11 August 1979	2 December 1981	2002	Sold to Greece
Bloys van Treslong	F824	Willem Bloys van Treslong	Wilton-Fijenoord	5 May 1978	15 November 1980	25 November 1982	2003	Sold to Greece
Jan van Brakel	F825	Jan van Brakel	Royal Schelde	16 November 1979	16 May 1981	14 April 1983	2001	Sold to Greece
Pieter Florisz (ex-Willem van der Zaan)	F826	Pieter Florisse	Royal Schelde	21 January 1981	8 May 1982	1 October 1983	2001	Sold to Greece

== Export ==
=== Greece ===
The first two frigates were acquired in 1980 and entered service with the Hellenic Navy in 1981 and 1982. Named Elli and Limnos construction of a third ship, to be built in Greece, was cancelled. On the initial Greek ships, the 40 mm gun was never installed and instead of the Goalkeeper CIWS, two American Phalanx Mk 15 20 mm (0.79 in) CIWS were installed instead, to either side of the aft 76 mm gun. Furthermore, the Hellenic Navy did not operate Lynx helicopters so the hangar was extended 2.2 m (7 ft 3 in) to accommodate two Agusta-Bell AB 212ASW helicopters. From 1993 to 1997 four more Kortenaer-class frigates entered service with the Hellenic Navy and underwent the same modifications as Elli and Limnos with the exception of the lengthened hangars. From 2001 to 2003, the final four ships entered Greek service and were also modified like the others taken over from Dutch service. Six of the ships underwent an electronics refit from 2003 to 2006. The first of the Greek frigates was taken out of service in 2013.

=== Iran ===
The Imperial Iranian Navy was preparing to place an order with Royal Schelde for eight ships but all military contracts were cancelled after the Iranian Revolution.

=== United Arab Emirates ===
Two ships were transferred to the United Arab Emirates military, entering service as Abu Dhabi and Al Emirat in December 1997 and May 1998 respectively. Based at Jebel Ali, the two frigates had additional air conditioning fitted, a new surface search radar (Signaal Scout using the I band) and operated two Eurocopter AS565 Panther helicopters. Al Emirat was later converted into a super luxury yacht known as Yas in 2015. There were plans to convert Abu Dhabi into a superyacht as well.

== See also ==
- List of frigates of the Netherlands

Equivalent frigates of the same era

- Bremen class
- Maestrale class
- Georges Leygues class
- Niterói class
- Krivak class
- Knox class

== Bibliography ==
- Couhat, Jean Labayle, ed. (1986). Combat Fleets of the World 1986/87. Annapolis, Maryland: Naval Institute Press. ISBN 0-85368-860-5.
- Jordan, John (1995). "Netherlands". In Gardiner, Robert; Chumbley, Stephen & Budzbon, Przemysław (eds.). Conway's All the World's Fighting Ships 1947–1995. Annapolis, Maryland: Naval Institute Press. ISBN 1-55750-132-7.
- Karreman, Jaime (16 August 2019). "Kortenaer klasse (S-) fregatten" [Kortenaer class (S) frigates]. Marineschepen (in Dutch).
- Moore, John, ed. (1984). Jane's Fighting Ships 1984–85. New York: Jane's Publishing Incorporated. ISBN 0-7106-0795-4.
- Saunders, Stephen, ed. (2004). Jane's Fighting Ships 2004–2005 (107 ed.). Alexandria, Virginia: Jane's Information Group Inc. ISBN 0-7106-2623-1.
- Sharpe, Richard, ed. (1991). Jane's Fighting Ships 1991–92 (94 ed.). Surrey, United Kingdom: Jane's Information Group. ISBN 0-7106-0960-4.
- Wertheim, Eric, ed. (2013). The Naval Institute Guide to Combat Fleets of the World (16th ed.). Annapolis, Maryland: Naval Institute Press. ISBN 9-7-815911-4954-5.
