= HNLMS Banckert (F810) =

Dutch frigate of the Kortenaer class

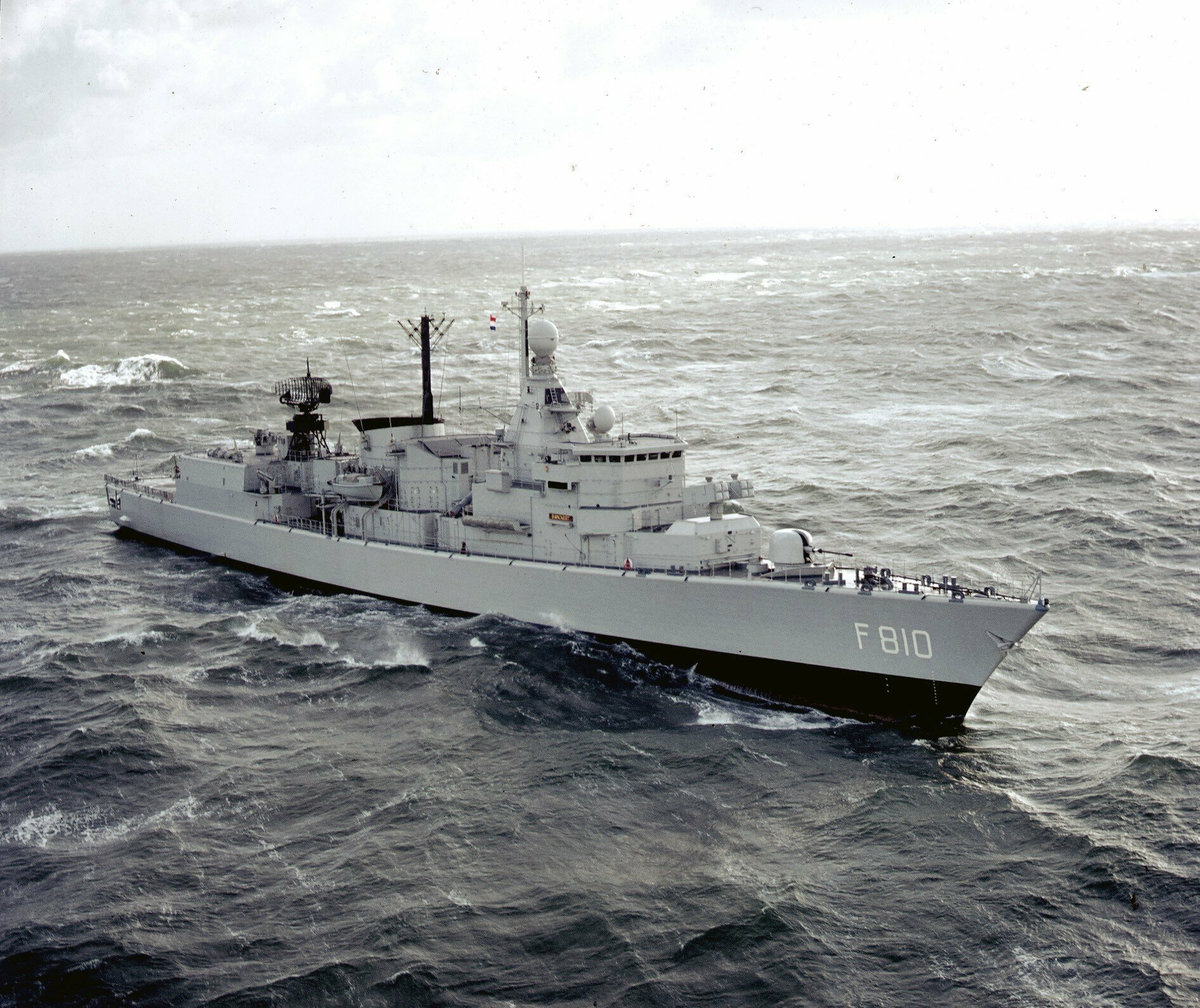
- HNLMS Banckert

History

Netherlands
- Name: Banckert
- Namesake: Joost Banckert
- Builder: KM de Schelde, Vlissingen
- Laid down: 25 February 1976
- Launched: 30 September 1978
- Commissioned: 29 October 1980
- Decommissioned: 14 May 1993
- Fate: Sold to the Hellenic Navy, 14 May 1993

Greece
- Name: Aigaion
- Acquired: 14 May 1993
- Commissioned: 14 May 1993
- Identification: F460
- Status: Active service

General characteristics
- Class & type: Kortenaer-class frigate
- Displacement: 3,500 long tons (3,600 t) standard; 3,800 long tons (3,900 t) full load
- Length: 130 m (426 ft 6 in)
- Beam: 14.4 m (47 ft 3 in)
- Draft: 4.4 m (14 ft 5 in)
- Propulsion: Combined gas or gas (COGOG) system: 2 × Rolls-Royce Tyne RM1C gas turbines, 4,900 shp (3,700 kW) each; 2 × Rolls-Royce Olympus TM3B gas turbines, 25,700 shp (19,200 kW) each (boost); 2 shafts
- Speed: 20 knots (37 km/h; 23 mph) cruise; 30 knots (56 km/h; 35 mph) maximum
- Endurance: 4,700 nautical miles at 16 knots (8,700 km at 30 km/h)
- Complement: 176–196
- Armament: 2 × OTO-Melara Compatto 76 mm/62 cal. gun; 2 × twin Mk46 torpedo tubes; 2 × quad RGM-84 Harpoon anti-ship missile launchers; 1 × 8-cell Sea Sparrow anti-aircraft missile launchers; 1 × Goalkeeper in Dutch service; 1 × Phalanx in Greek service
- Aircraft carried: 2 × Sea Lynx helicopters (1 in peacetime)

HNLMS Banckert (F810) (Dutch: Hr.Ms. Banckert) was a frigate of the Kortenaer class. The ship was in service with the Royal Netherlands Navy from 1980-2003. She was named after Dutch naval hero Joost Banckert, and her radio call sign was "PADD".

== Dutch service history ==
HNLMS Banckert was built at KM de Schelde in Vlissingen. The keel laying took place on 25 February 1976, and she was launched on 30 September 1978. The ship was put into service on 29 October 1980.

The ship was added to STANAVFORLANT on 7 January 1983 and met with the other ships on 20 January in Plymouth.

She left on 6 November where she served as station ship from 17 November 1989 until 19 May 1990.

On 14 May 1993, the vessel was decommissioned and sold to the Hellenic Navy.

== Greek service history ==
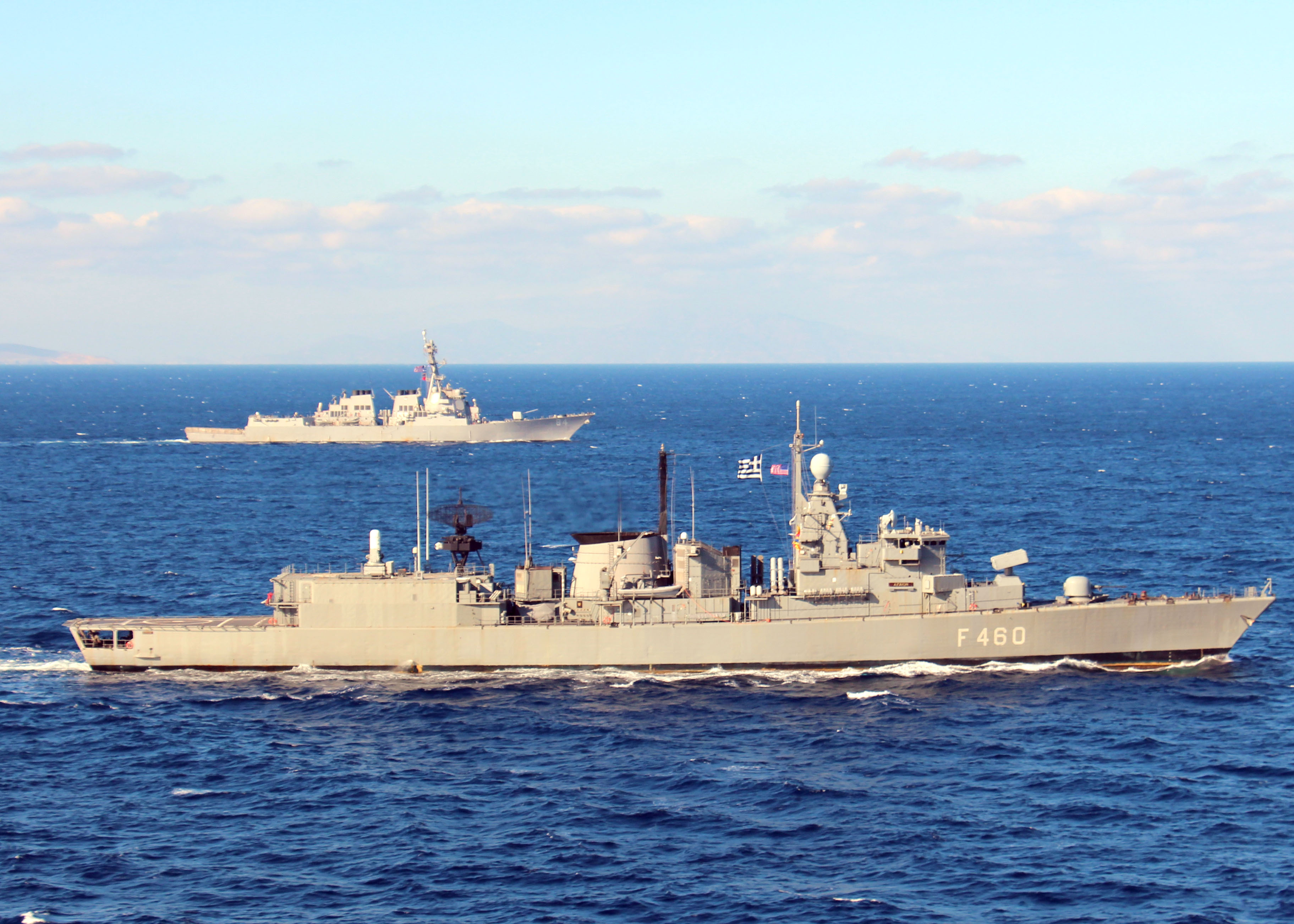
Aigaion transiting the Aegean Sea in 2015.

The ship was commissioned 14 May 1993 in the Hellenic Navy as part of the Elli class, where the ship was renamed Aigaion (Aegean) using the radio call sign "SZDR".
