= Combined gas or gas =

Marine propulsion system

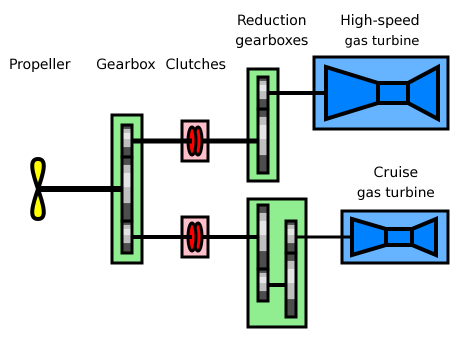
Principle of a COGOG propulsion system

Combined gas or gas (COGOG) is a propulsion system for ships using gas turbine engines.

== System ==
Combined marine propulsion

Combined diesel or gas (CODOG)
Combined diesel and gas (CODAG)
Combined diesel-electric and diesel (CODLAD)
Combined diesel–electric and gas (CODLAG)
Combined diesel and diesel (CODAD)
Combined steam and gas (COSAG)
Combined gas or gas (COGOG)
Combined gas and gas (COGAG)
Combined gas and steam (COGAS)
Combined nuclear and steam propulsion (CONAS)
Integrated electric propulsion (IEP or IFEP)

A high efficiency, low output turbine is used for cruising speeds with a high output turbine being used for high-speed operations. A clutch allows either turbine to be selected, but there is no gearbox to allow operation of both turbines at once. This has the advantage of not requiring heavy, expensive and potentially unreliable gearboxes. The reason that a smaller turbine is used for cruising is that a small turbine running at 100% power is more fuel efficient than a bigger turbine running at 50% power.

The system is currently used in the 2 ships of the Russian Navy's Slava-class cruisers, the Japanese Maritime Self-Defense Force's Hatsuyuki-class destroyers, and the Royal Netherlands Navy Kortenaer-class frigates (on which the Greek Navy Elli-class frigates are based). It was formerly used in the Royal Navy's Type 42 destroyer and Type 22 frigate, as well as the Royal Canadian Navy's Iroquois-class destroyer.

== Development ==
Having previously pioneered the combined diesel or gas (CODOG) system, in 1968 the Royal Navy converted an old frigate, HMS Exmouth, to COGOG propulsion as a test bed for use in later ships. Because developing a new gas turbine purely for marine use would be very expensive, it was decided to adapt a Rolls-Royce Olympus engine, which had been originally designed for the Avro Vulcan bomber and further developed for the Concorde supersonic airliner. Cruising power was provided by two Rolls-Royce Proteus gas turbines, originally designed for turboprop airliners, each rated at 3,250 shaft horsepower (2,420 kW). The Olympus had to be down-rated to 15,000 shaft horsepower (11,000 kW) to keep within the limits of the Exmouth's hull structure.

Even before the Exmouth trials had started, the Royal Navy had already ordered the first class of vessels to be designed from the start for COGOG propulsion, the Type 21 frigates, in which the Proteus turbines were replaced by a pair of Rolls-Royce Tyne engines. The Tynes were rated at 4,250 shaft horsepower (3,170 kW) each, giving a cruising speed 18 knots (33 km/h; 21 mph), while an Olympus rated at 25,000 shp gave a maximum speed of 32 knots (59 km/h; 37 mph). However, they were beaten into service by the Canadian Iroquois-class destroyers, which were powered by two Pratt & Whitney FT4A2 gas turbines creating 50,000 shaft horsepower (37,000 kW) and two Pratt & Whitney FT12AH3 cruising gas turbines creating 7,400 shp (5,500 kW), giving a maximum speed of 29 knots (54 km/h; 33 mph).

== Disadvantages ==
The operation of large gas turbines on ships produces a high volume of very hot exhaust gasses, which can hinder onboard helicopter operations, and also greatly increases a ship's infrared signature making it more conspicuous to enemy sensors and guided weapons. The ducting and filters required take up a considerable amount of space in a ship, and the volume of air being drawn in can exacerbate an internal fire. This was found to be a factor in the loss of HMS Antelope during the 1982 Falklands War. Many navies have now abandoned pure gas turbine propulsion in favour of combined diesel–electric and gas (CODLAG) systems.
