= West Indies Guard Ship (Netherlands) =

West Indies Guard Ship

- Stationsschip in de West
- Country: Netherlands
- Part of: Royal Netherlands Navy
- Headquarters: Parera Naval Base

Commanders
- Commander: Brigadier general Frank Boots

The West Indies Guard Ship (WIGS) is a ship of the Royal Netherlands Navy that rotates about every four to six months in support of the Dutch Caribbean Coast Guard. It can be a frigate but more commonly one of the navy's Holland-class offshore patrol vessels is deployed to the region. This vessel usually carries an NHIndustries NH90 helicopter for search and rescue tasks and pursuit of suspect vessels.

A special boarding team from the U.S. Coast Guard can be embarked on board the WIGS, authorized to carry out boardings beyond the territorial waters of the Dutch Caribbean islands. This cooperation between Aruba, Curaçao, the Netherlands, Sint Maarten, the United States, and other actors is formalized in the Joint Interagency Task Force South, situated in Key West, Florida, United States.

== Stationed ships ==
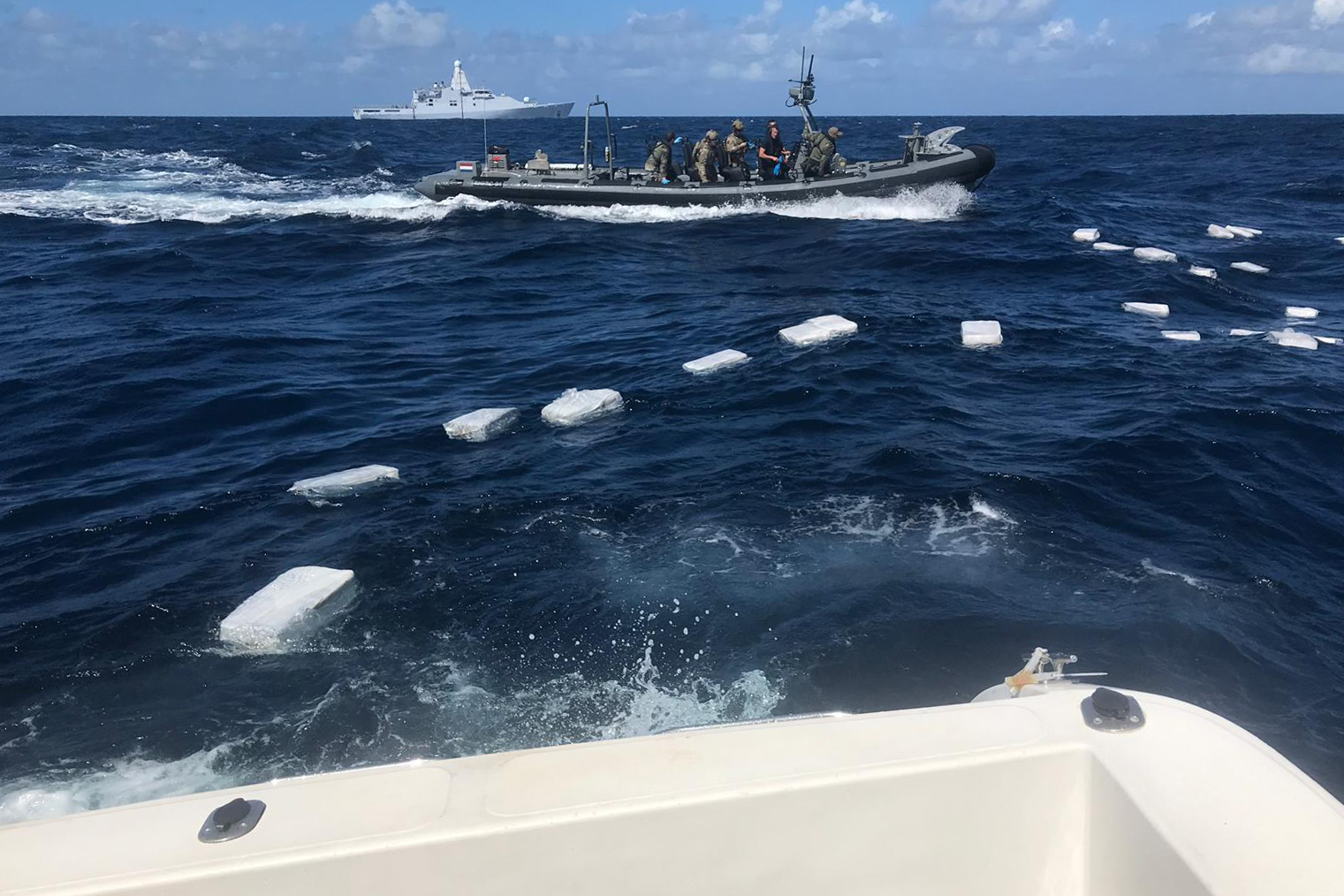
HNLMS Zeeland during a narcotics recovery operation

Current West Indies Guard Ship

Period served as WIGS	Ship	Note
September 2026- Present	HNLMS Friesland (P842)	
June 2026 – September 2026	HNLMS Groningen (P843)	
February 2026 – June 2026	HNLMS Friesland (P842)	
September 2025 – February 2026	HNLMS Groningen (P843)	
September 2025	HNLMS Van Amstel (F831)	
May 2025 – September 2025	HNLMS Friesland (P842)	
January 2025 – May 2025	HNLMS Groningen (P843)	
September 2024 – December 2024	HNLMS Holland (P840)	
March 2024 – August 2024	HNLMS Groningen (P843)	
June 2023 – March 2024	-Vacant-	
October 2022 – May 2023	HNLMS Holland (P840)	
April 2022 – October 2022	HNLMS Groningen (P843)	
January 2022 – April 2022	HNLMS Friesland (P842)	
May 2021 – January 2022	HNLMS Holland (P840)	
December 2020 – May 2021	-Vacant-	
July 2020 – December 2020	HNLMS Groningen (P843)	
April 2020 – July 2020	HNLMS Zeeland (P841)	
April 2019 – April 2020	HNLMS Groningen (P843)	
December 2018 – April 2019	HNLMS Zeeland (P841)	
July 2018 – December 2018	HNLMS Friesland (P842)	
April 2018 – July 2018	HNLMS Holland (P840)	
October 2017 – April 2018	HNLMS Van Speijk (F828)	
June 2017 – October 2017	HNLMS Zeeland (P841)	
March 2017 – June 2017	HNLMS Van Amstel (F831)	
October 2016 – March 2017	HNLMS Holland (P840)	
June 2016 – October 2016	HNLMS Groningen (P843)	
January 2016 – June 2016	HNLMS De Zeven Provinciën (F802)	
September 2015 – January 2016	HNLMS Friesland (P842)	
June 2015 – September 2015	HNLMS Van Amstel (F831)	
February 2015 – June 2015	HNLMS Zeeland (P841)	
August 2014 – February 2015	HNLMS Holland (P840)	
May 2014 – August 2014	HNLMS Groningen (P843)	
January 2014 – May 2014	HNLMS Zeeland (P841)	
August 2013 – January 2014	HNLMS Amsterdam (A836)	
May 2013 – August 2013	HNLMS Holland (P840)	
January 2013 – May 2013	HNLMS Friesland (P842)	

== See also ==
- West Indies Guard Ship, Royal Navy equivalent.
