= Operation Martillo =

Anti-drug effort in Central and South America since 2012

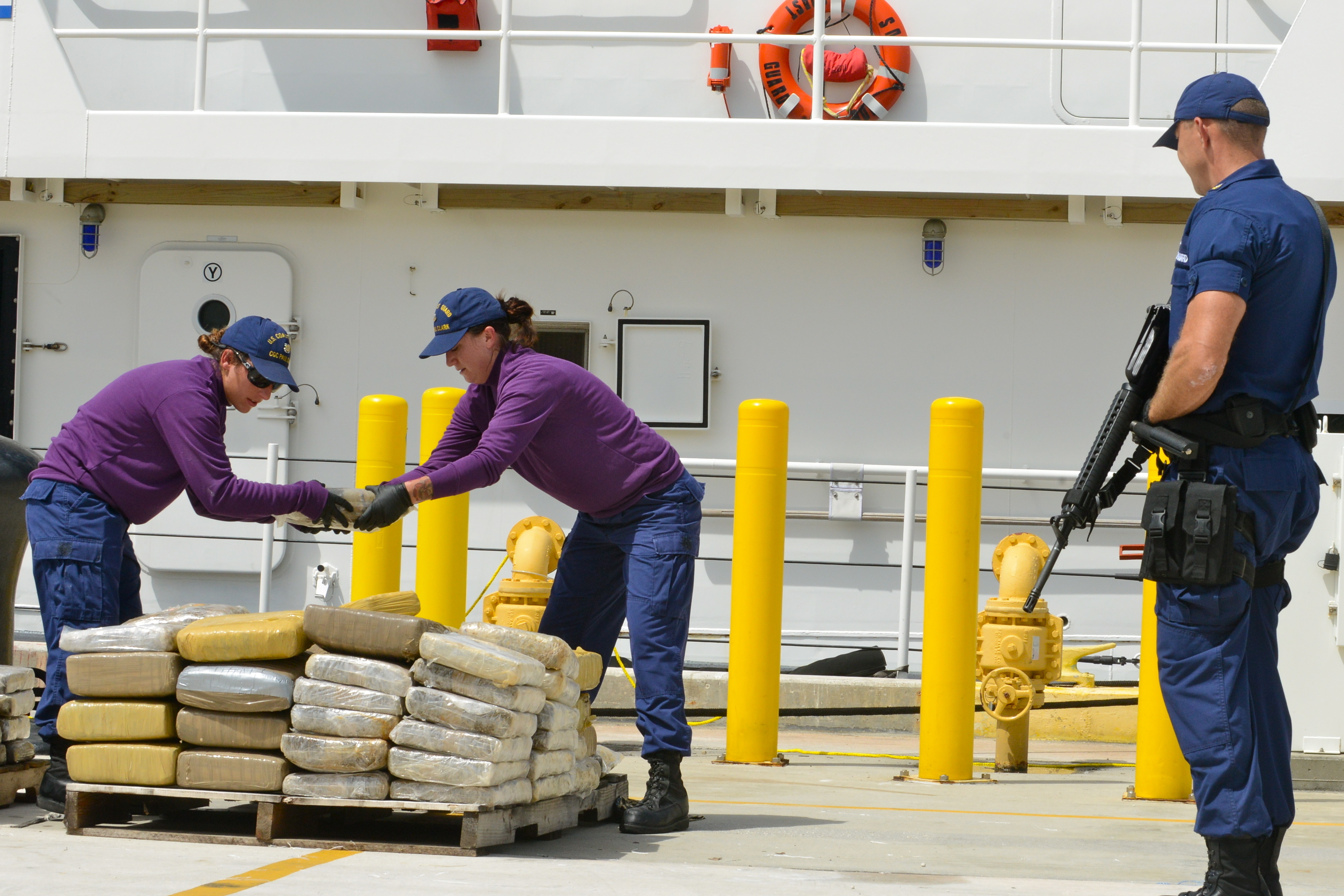
Coast Guard unloading captured drugs at Miami Beach, 2014

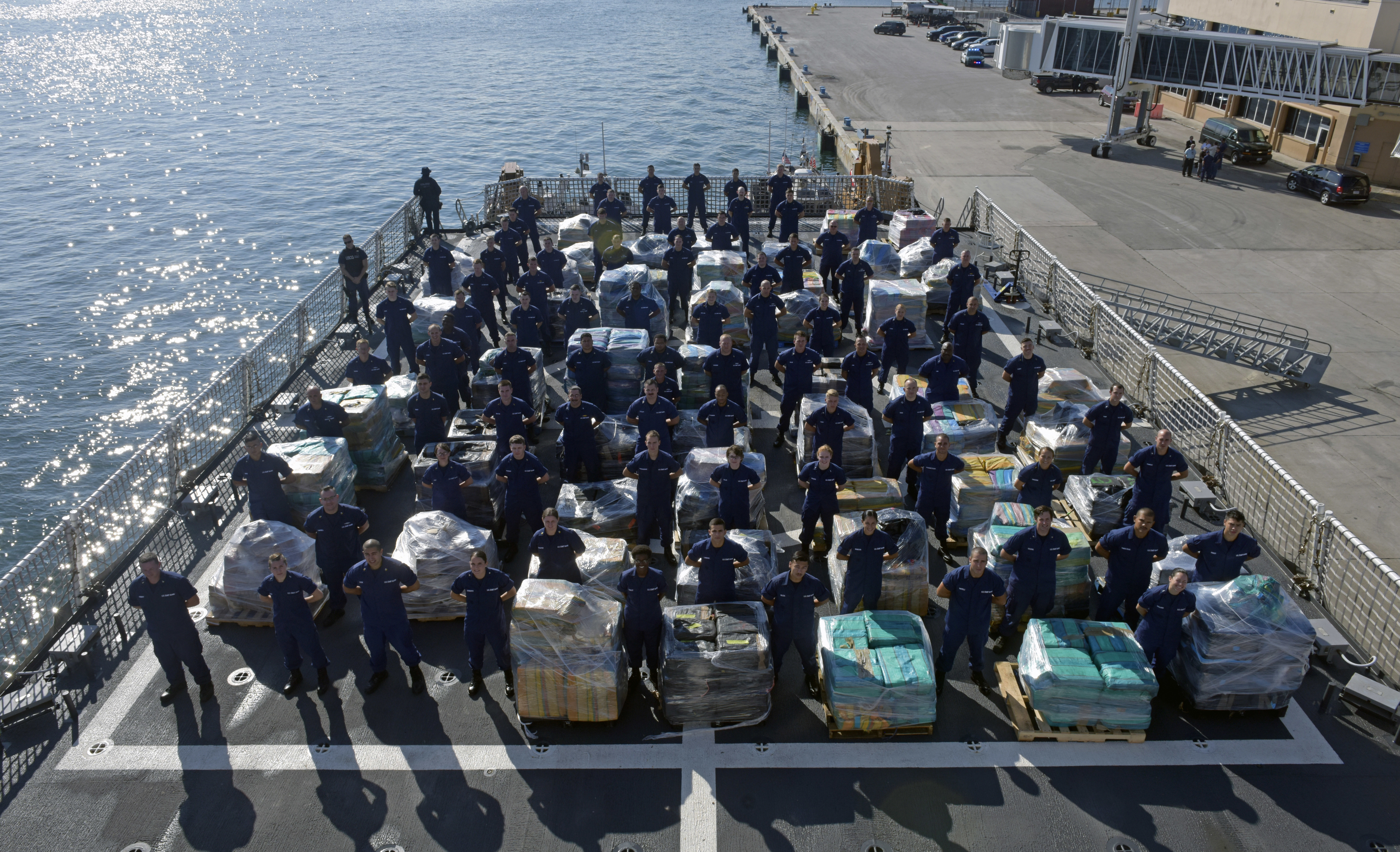
USCGC Hamilton crew next to 26.5 tons of cocaine, 2016

Operation Martillo is an ongoing multi-national anti-drug operation that began on 15 January 2012 which "aims to combat international drug trafficking, and promote peace, stability in Central and South America", according to the U.S. Southern Command. It is a defense project led by the United States Southern Command with help of multi-national forces from Latin American and European countries. News coverage of their activities and results began in 2012, which was mainly from defense-focused media.

== Command ==
The United States Southern Command's (SOUTHCOM) Joint Interagency Task Force South (JIATF-South), based in Key West, Florida

=== National forces ===
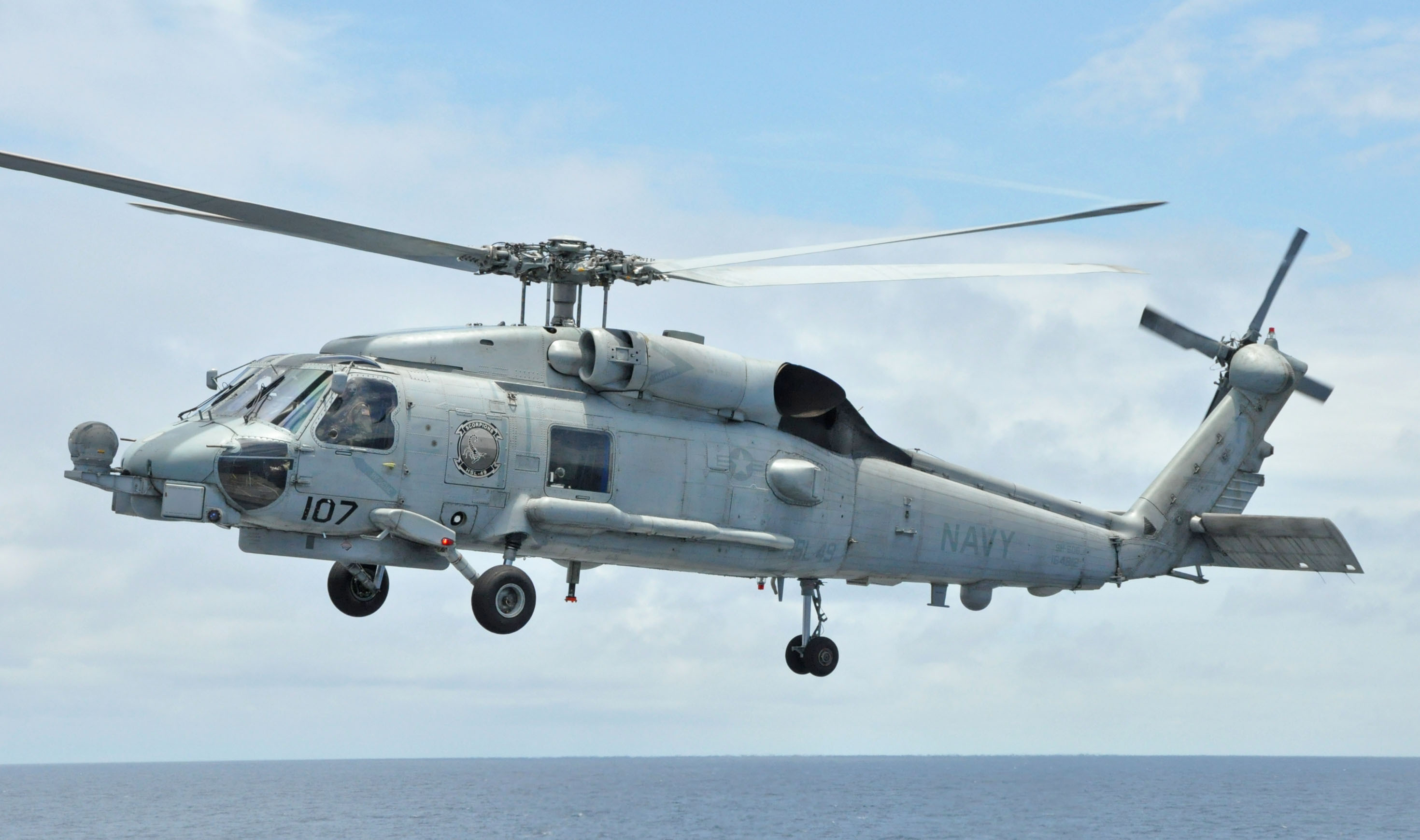
U.S. Navy SH-60B Seahawk helicopter takes off from USS Rentz

==== Belize ====
Land-based support by the Belize Defense Force and Police with additional support from Canada.

==== Canada ====
The Canadian participation in the operation, which began in 2006 has been given the code name Operation Caribbe given the object of eliminating illegal trafficking in the Caribbean Sea and the eastern Pacific Ocean by organized crime and includes air and sea forces deployed on a rotational basis.

==== Colombia ====
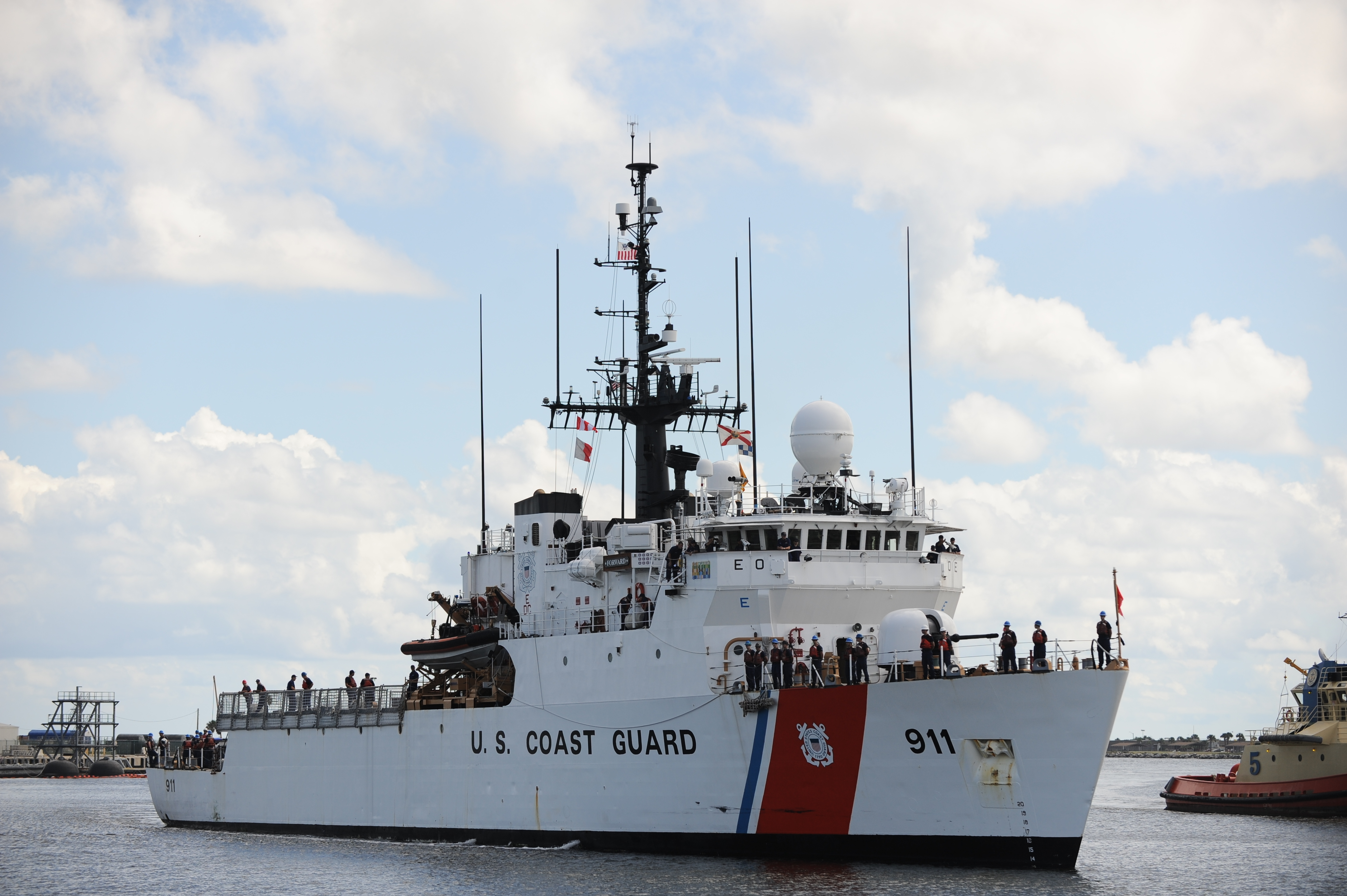
USCGC Forward approaches Naval Station Mayport, 2013

The world’s largest producer of cocaine. A DH-8 aircraft employed in Operation Martillo crashed in Colombia in October 2013, killing three Americans and one Panamanian operative.

In May 2015, Colombia announced it was stopping using a controversial herbicide to destroy plantations of coca following a warning by the World Health Organization (WHO) that glyphosate is "probably carcinogenic".

==== Costa Rica ====
A major conduit through which the cocaine traffic moves towards the United States with the Costa Rica Security Ministry predicting a huge increase to 1,700 tons moving through the country in 2016.

==== El Salvador ====
Granting permission for U.S. forces to use El Salvador as a base in the hunt for illegal drug shipments has allowed groups like Patrol Squadron 8 to fly missions from the country.

==== Guatemala ====
Land-based operations, with the country permitting US Marines to join in the fight against drugs. These operations extended into coastal littorals and involved multi-national partners.

==== Honduras ====
The Honduran Navy and US Coast Guard intercepted a sinking self-propelled semi-submersible vessel in March 2012.

==== Netherlands ====
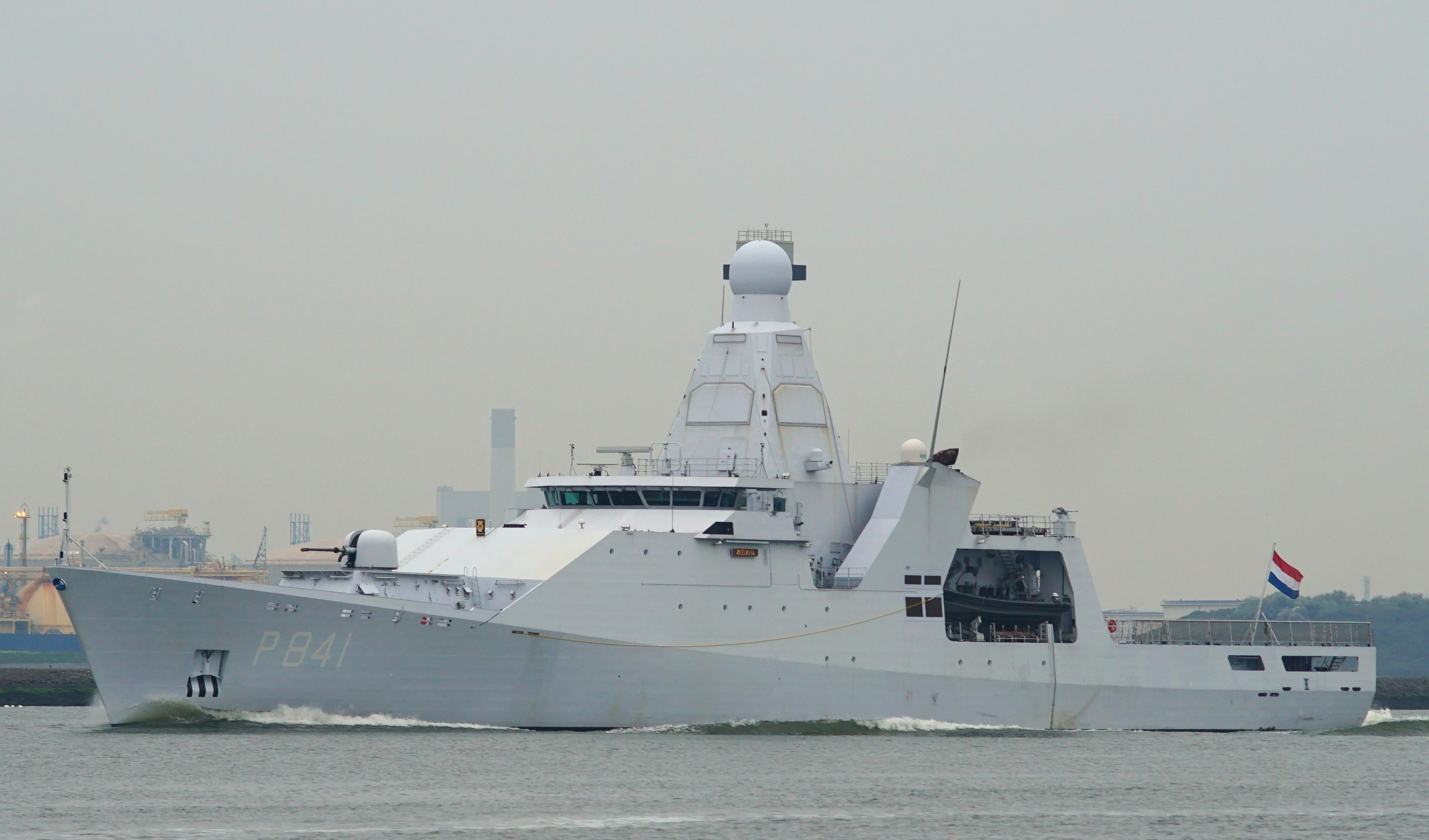
HNLMS Zeeland, 2014

The Royal Netherlands Navy deployed ships, with aircraft from the Dutch Caribbean Coast Guard. A parallel operation Operation Caribbean Venture under the command of the Netherlands Forces in the Caribbean works closely with JIATF-South and has the same objectives as Operation Martillo. HNLMS Friesland and HNLMS Zeeland have successfully participated in the operation.

==== Nicaragua ====
Nicaraguan army small craft, assisted by the US Coast Guard intercepted US $32 million worth of cocaine in June 2012, and a further 9.2 million in November 2014.

==== Panama ====
In 2012 Panama authorities seized 15.5 tons of drugs. In April 2013 a further US $242 million of cocaine was seized on a go-fast boat.

==== Spain ====
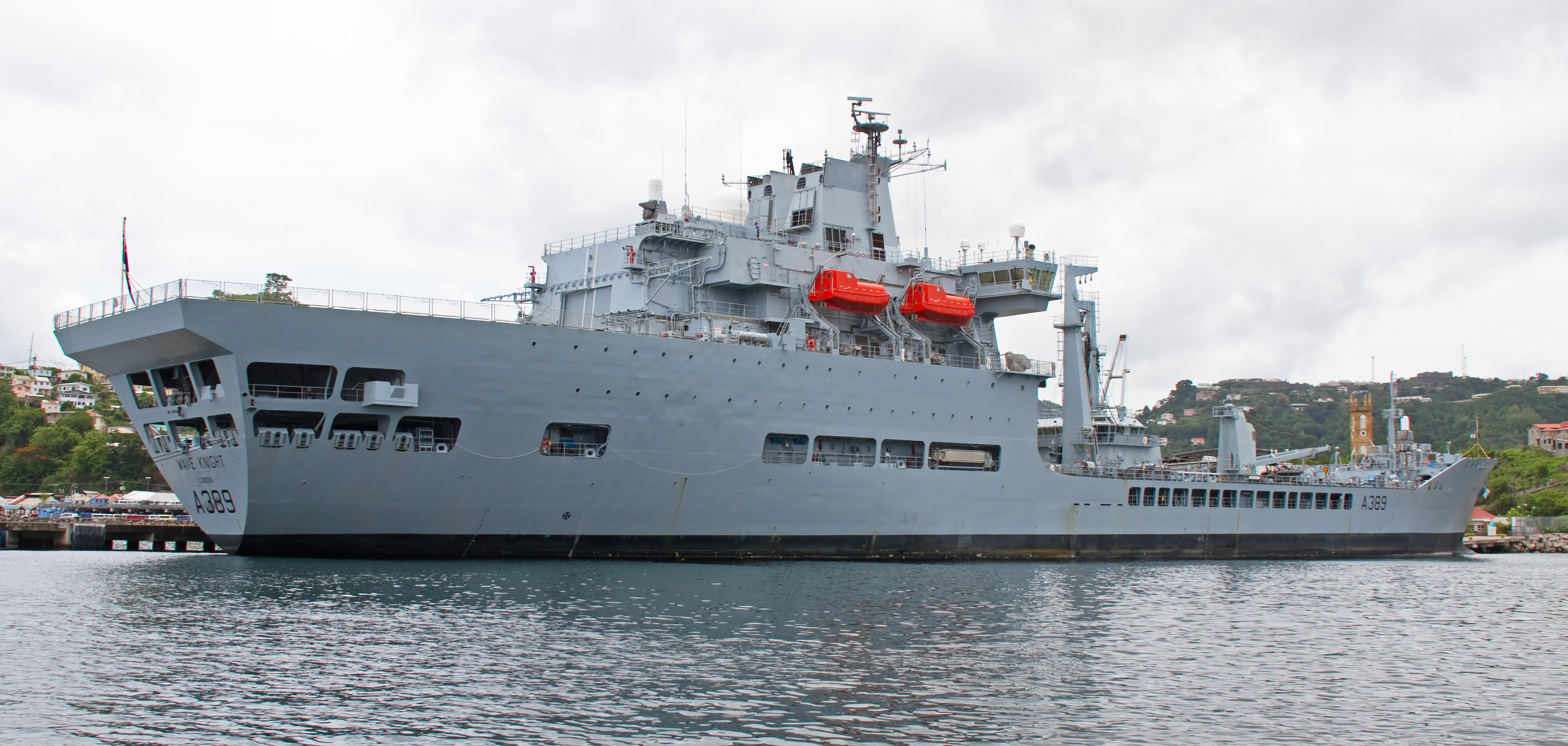
RFA Wave Knight, 2013

Spain provides ships, aircraft, and liaison officers.

==== United Kingdom ====
Royal Navy resources undertaking maritime security operations. Ships involved include HMS Argyll which seized US $128 million worth of drugs in 2013, and RFA Wave Knight which seized £60 million or 1.25 tons of cocaine with the US Coast Guard in 2014.

==== United States ====
In addition to SOUTHCOM, the United States Coast Guard, United States Navy, United States Marine Corps, and United States Air Forces all provide resources for the operation, as well as the Drug Enforcement Administration and various law enforcement agencies. In December 2022 the USNS Comfort arrived in Haiti.

== Results ==
Between January 2012 and April 2013, the operation intercepted 171 tons of cocaine and 28,000 pounds of marijuana; detained 411 criminal suspects; recovered US $7.4 million in laundered cash; and seized or destroyed 139 speedboats, fishing vessels, aircraft, pangas, and drug-trafficking Submersibles.

Between January 2012 and May 2015, 515 tons of cocaine and 117,754 pounds of marijuana have been seized, worth US $8 billion to drug organizations. It has also led to the arrest of at least 1,348 people.

Between January 2012 and February 2017, 693 tons of cocaine, US $25 million in cash, 581 vessels and aircraft were detained and 1,863 detainees were arrested.

Seizures have since 2017 become smaller, possibly a result of the previous successes. In 2019 a 62 day patrol, led to 7 interceptions and the discovery of 6 tons of cocaine worth around $377m. In 2020 a similar ships patrol discovered 2 tons worth $60m. 2021 saw Coast Guard Cutter Tampa detain cocaine with a value of $94m. In 2022 another ships 2 month deployment saw 3 tons worth $100m seized.

== Difficulties and solutions ==
In 2014, Southern Command Cmdr. Marine Gen. John Kelly said, "Because of asset shortfalls, we’re unable to get after 74 percent of suspected maritime drug smuggling." In 2015, there was a 50% increase in the number of US cutters as well as an increase in maritime aircraft patrols. In 2014, JIATF-South was only able to target 383 of the 1,426 maritime drug movements documented.

Between October 2014 and April 2015, 64% of all seizures and disruptions involved a non-US nation’s participation. Allied and Partner Nation's vessels and aircraft were often being used to spot, identify and monitor potential smugglers before passing the information to US intercepts.

The United Nations Office on Drugs and Crime (UNOCD) estimates the 2013 annual world production of cocaine to have been between 660 and 900 tons. Seizures in Operation Martillo rose from 78 tons in 2012 to 162 tons in 2013. In 2015, UNOCD indicated an increased production of cocaine in Columbia by 44%, and Costa Rica estimated a dramatic rise in world production in 2016.
