= Friesland (disambiguation) =

Friesland is a province of the Netherlands.

Friesland may also refer to:

== Geography ==
In Europe

- Frisia, a coastal North Sea region extending from the Netherlands to the German–Danish border region
- East Frisia (East Friesland), an area of northern Germany, in Lower Saxony
- Friesland (district), 1933–1977, 1980–ongoing: a Landkreis in the German state of Lower Saxony
- Lordship of Friesland, historical region, 1524–1795.
- Friesland Department, 1802–1810, Batavian Republic
- Frise (department), 1811–1814, French Empire
- Frisland, a mythical island in the 16th century and 17th century

Outside Europe

- Friesland, Paraguay, a village (mennonite colony) in Paraguay
- Friesland, Wisconsin, a village in south central Wisconsin
- Friesland, Minnesota, an unincorporated community in east central Minnesota
- Vriesland, Michigan, a village in Michigan settled by Frisian immigrants
- Friesland Ridge, a ridge in Tangra Mountains, Livingston Island, Antarctica;
- Mount Friesland, in the Friesland Ridge, Tangra Mountains, Livingston Island, Antarctica

== Military ==
- The German Air Force Regiment "Friesland"
- Friesland class destroyer
- HNLMS Friesland, several ships of the Dutch navy

== Other ==
- Friesland School
- Friesland Porzellan, a German porcelain manufacturer since 1958

== See also ==
- Frisia (disambiguation)
- West Friesland (disambiguation)
