= HNLMS Friesland =

HNLMS Friesland (Dutch: Hr.Ms. or Zr.Ms. Friesland) may refer to following ships of the Royal Netherlands Navy:

- HNLMS Friesland (1896), a Holland-class protected cruiser
- HNLMS Friesland (1953), a Friesland-class destroyer
- HNLMS Friesland (P842), a Holland-class offshore patrol vessel
