= 2014 Nuclear Security Summit =

- Host country: Netherlands
- Date: March 24–25, 2014
- Cities: The Hague
- Venues: World Forum
- Participants: 58 representatives
- Follows: 2012 Nuclear Security Summit
- Precedes: 2016 Nuclear Security Summit
- Website: nss2014.com

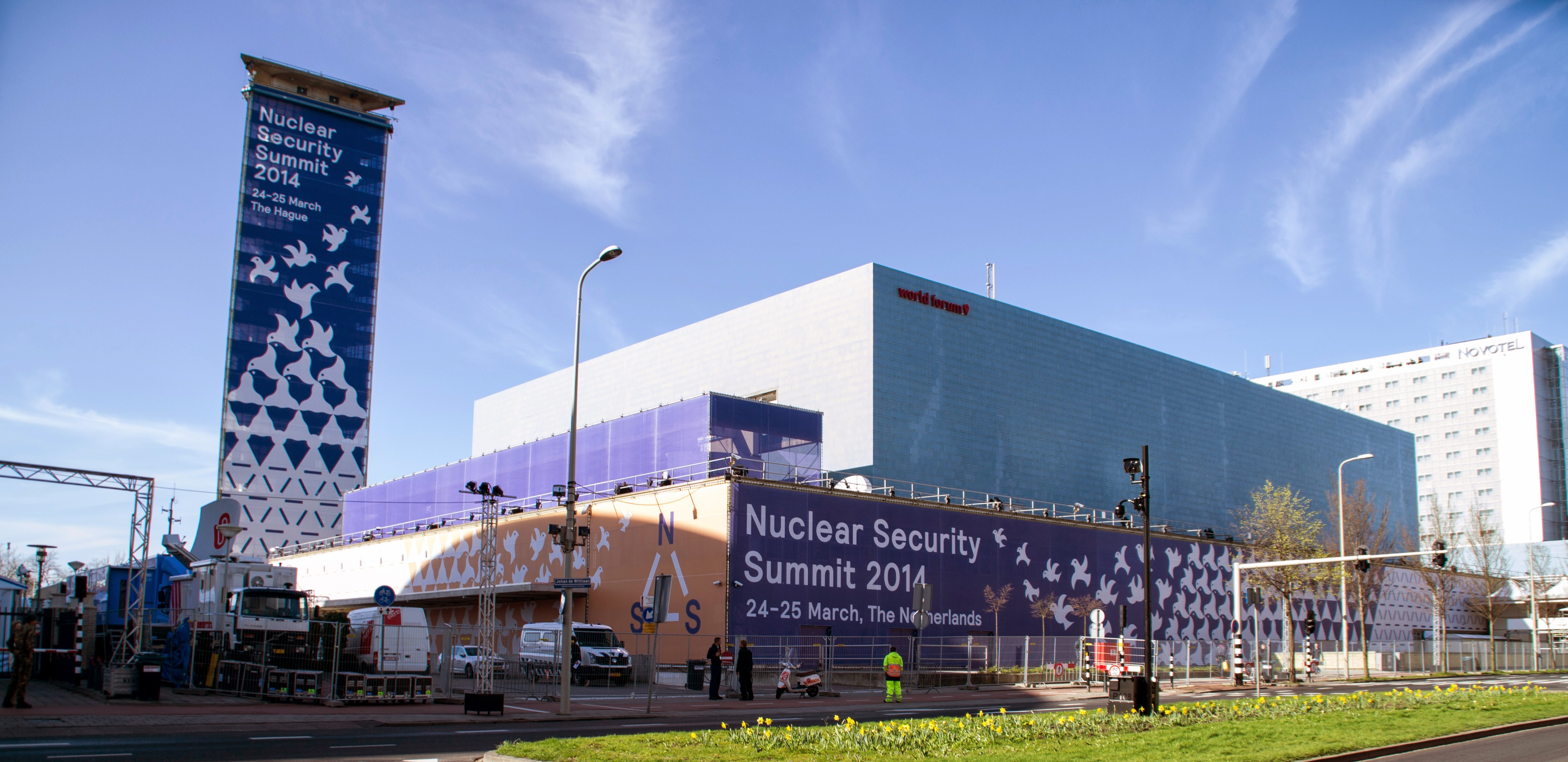
The World Forum in The Hague during the 2014 Nuclear Security Summit

The 2014 Nuclear Security Summit was a summit held in The Hague, the Netherlands, on March 24 and 25, 2014. It was the third edition of the conference, succeeding the 2012 Nuclear Security Summit. The 2014 summit was attended by 58 world leaders (5 of which from observing international organizations), some 5,000 delegates and some 3,000 journalists. The representatives attending the summit included US President Barack Obama and Chinese leader Xi Jinping.

The main goal of the conference was generally to improve international cooperation and more specifically to assess which of the objectives that were set at the previous summits in Washington, D.C., and Seoul had not been accomplished in the previous four years and proposing ways of achieving them.

The Nuclear Security Summit aimed to prevent nuclear terrorism by:

1. reducing the amount of dangerous nuclear material in the world – especially highly enriched uranium
2. improving the security of all nuclear material and radioactive sources
3. improving international cooperation

Countries that participated were interested in leading a certain security theme to a higher level. They could do so by offering a "gift basket", which is an extra initiative that can functioned as a role model for a specific security aspect (provided that it is supported by other countries). The Netherlands, for example, has been developing a gift basket that improves expertise and (international) cooperation regarding nuclear forensics with the help of the Netherlands Forensic Institute.

Although nuclear terrorism and its prevention to reduce and secure nuclear supplies are officially the main topic, the Ukraine crisis overshadowed the talks. The event formed the backdrop for an emergency meeting of G7 leaders on Russia's annexation of Crimea earlier in March 2014. Russian President Vladimir Putin did not attend, instead sending Foreign Minister Sergey Lavrov, who was expected to hold talks with US Secretary of State John Kerry and Rose Gottemoeller, the US Under Secretary of State for Arms Control and International Security. Notable absentees from the summit were North Korea and Iran, excluded by mutual consent.

== Background ==
Highly enriched uranium and plutonium can be used to manufacture nuclear weapons. However, highly enriched uranium is also used in research reactors and for medical isotope production. Plutonium is used by some countries as fuel for nuclear power plants. The leaders gathered at the Nuclear Security Summit aimed to minimize the use of these materials, the amount kept in storage and the number of storage locations, keeping in mind the uses that are beneficial to mankind.

In the 4 years since the Washington Nuclear Security Summit in March 2010, Nuclear Security Summit countries had taken steps to accomplish this goal, as outlined in their national progress reports.

Nuclear and other radioactive materials are used extensively in hospitals, industry, and universities. Some of these places with radioactive materials are open to the public. Better securing these materials is one of the main objectives of the Nuclear Security Summit meetings. In addition to better physical security, improving of sensitive information would also help to reduce the likelihood of a terrorist act with radiological or nuclear material, a dirty bomb.

Installing radiation detection equipment would increase the probability of getting caught when smuggling and this would decrease the likelihood of people trying to acquire the materials in the first place. In these areas the Nuclear Security Summit participants reported progress.

== Participants ==
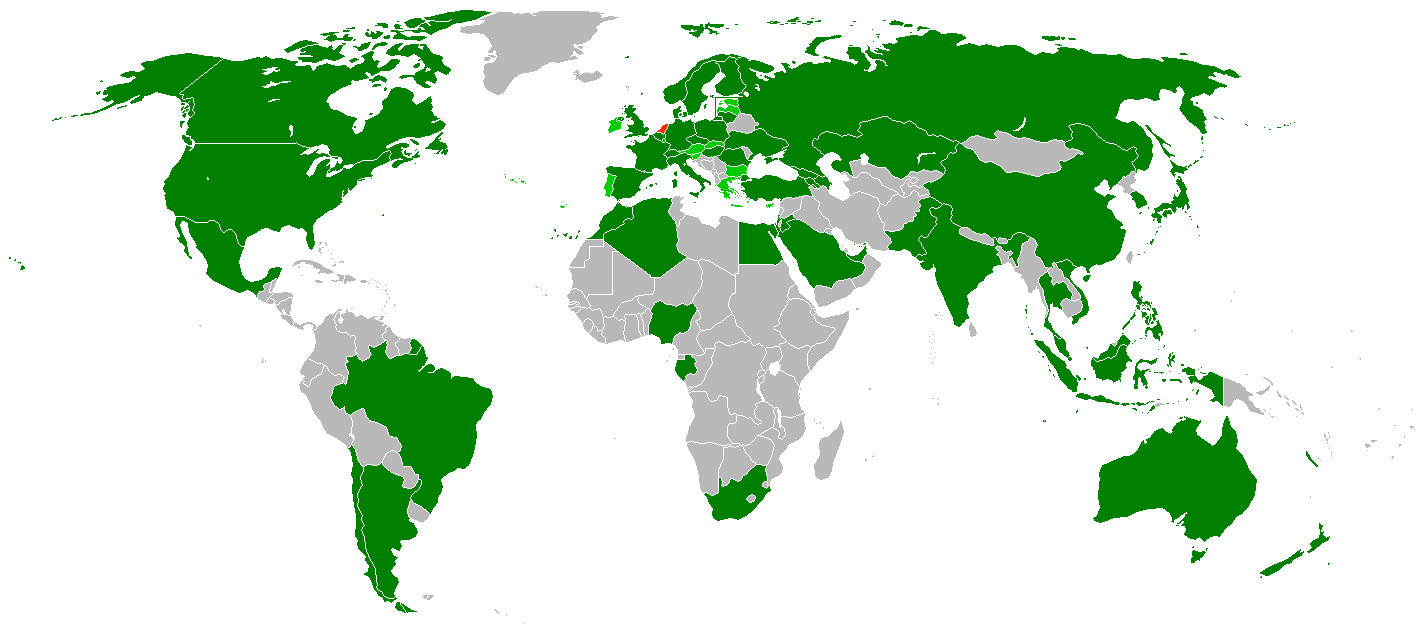
Host state (Netherlands) Participating states European Union states represented by the President of the European Council and the President of the European Commission only (as observer)

The 2014 Nuclear Security Summit was the largest conference ever held in the Netherlands at the time. The 53 participating countries and 4 observing organizations of the 2014 Nuclear Security Summit were:

2014 Nuclear Security Summit attendees
Country or organization	Representative(s)
Algeria	Youcef Yousfi (Prime Minister)
Argentina	Amado Boudou (Vice President)
Armenia	Serzh Sargsyan (President)
Australia	Julie Bishop (Minister for Foreign Affairs)
Azerbaijan	Ilham Aliyev (President)
Belgium	Elio Di Rupo (Prime Minister)
Brazil	Michel Temer (Vice President)
Canada	Stephen Harper (Prime Minister)
Chile	Heraldo Muñoz (Minister of Foreign Affairs)
China	Xi Jinping (CCP General Secretary and President)
Czech Republic	Pavel Bělobrádek (Deputy Prime Minister)
Denmark	Helle Thorning-Schmidt (Prime Minister)
Egypt	Hamdi Sanad Loza (Deputy Minister of Foreign Affairs)
European Union (observer)	Herman Van Rompuy (President of the European Council)
European Union (observer)	José Manuel Barroso (President of the European Commission)
Finland	Sauli Niinistö (President)
France	François Hollande (President)
Gabon	Ali Bongo Ondimba (President)
Georgia	Irakli Garibashvili (Prime Minister)
Germany	Angela Merkel (Chancellor)
Hungary	János Martonyi (Minister of Foreign Affairs)
India	Salman Khurshid (Minister of External Affairs)
Indonesia	Boediono (Vice President)
International Atomic Energy Agency (observer)	Yukiya Amano (Director General)
Interpol (observer)	Ronald Noble (Secretary-General)
Israel	Yuval Steinitz (Minister of Intelligence, International Relations, and Strategic Affairs)
Italy	Matteo Renzi (Prime Minister)
Japan	Shinzō Abe (Prime Minister)
Jordan	Abdullah II (King)
Kazakhstan	Nursultan Nazarbayev (President)
Lithuania	Dalia Grybauskaitė (President)
Malaysia	Muhyiddin Yassin (Deputy Prime Minister)
Mexico	Juan Manuel Gómez-Robledo (Deputy Minister for Multilateral Affairs and Human Rights)
Morocco	Salaheddine Mezouar (Minister of Foreign Affairs)
Netherlands (host)	Mark Rutte (Prime Minister)
New Zealand	John Key (Prime Minister)
Nigeria	Goodluck Jonathan (President)
Norway	Erna Solberg (Prime Minister)
Pakistan	Mian Nawaz Sharif (Prime Minister)
Philippines	Jejomar Binay (Vice President)
Poland	Radosław Sikorski (Minister of Foreign Affairs)
Romania	Traian Băsescu (President)
Russia	Sergey Lavrov (Minister of Foreign Affairs)
Saudi Arabia	Hashim Yamani (President of KACARE)
Singapore	Lee Hsien Loong (Prime Minister)
South Africa	Maite Nkoana-Mashabane (Minister of International Relations and Cooperation)
South Korea	Park Geun-hye (President)
Spain	Mariano Rajoy (Prime Minister)
Sweden	Fredrik Reinfeldt (Prime Minister)
Switzerland	Didier Burkhalter (President)
Thailand	Sihasak Phuangketkeow (Special Envoy of the Prime Minister)
Turkey	Abdullah Gül (President)
Ukraine	Arseniy Yatsenyuk (Prime Minister)
United Arab Emirates	Mohammed bin Zayed Al Nahyan (Crown Prince of Abu Dhabi)
United Kingdom	David Cameron (Prime Minister)
United Nations (observer)	Ban Ki-moon (Secretary-General)
United States	Barack Obama (President)
Vietnam	Nguyễn Tấn Dũng (Prime Minister)

== Reported results ==
According to the submitted National Progress Reports of the participated states, 26 of the 28 Nuclear Security Summit countries that had at least 1 kg of highly enriched uranium at the time of the Washington Summit indicated that they have taken action to reduce the amount of dangerous nuclear material. Since the Seoul Summit, at least 15 metric tons of highly enriched uranium had been down-blended to low-enriched uranium, which will be used as fuel for nuclear power plants. This would be the equivalent to approximately 500 nuclear weapons.

Since 2009, 12 countries worldwide (Austria, Chile, Czechia, Hungary, Libya, Mexico, Romania, Serbia, Taiwan, Turkey, Ukraine and Vietnam) had removed all highly enriched uranium from their territory. 15 Nuclear Security Summit countries reported that they had repatriated highly enriched uranium or plutonium or were in the process of doing so. Some countries were also assisting other countries in efforts to repatriate highly enriched uranium or plutonium.

During the summit, 13 countries had subscribed to the highly enriched uranium-free joint statement. They underlined the importance of highly enriched uranium minimisation and called upon all countries in a position to do so to eliminate all highly enriched uranium from their territories in advance of the Nuclear Security Summit in 2016.

17 countries had converted or were in the process of converting at least 32 of their own research reactors of medical isotope production facilities. Nuclear Security Summit countries also assist other countries in converting their reactors. Nine countries reported that they were researching and developing techniques that use low-enriched uranium instead of highly enriched uranium.

Almost all Nuclear Security Summit countries stated that they had updated or were currently reviewing, updating or revising nuclear security-related legislation, such as that relating to physical protection, transportation and handling of radioactive sources, to comply with international guidelines and best practices.

During the summit, 30 countries supported development of a National Legislation Implementation Kit on Nuclear Security that countries could use as building blocks to incorporate the various guidelines into binding national regulations

== Schedule and agenda ==
=== March 24 ===
The schedule for the first day of the summit was as follows:

- From 1:30 pm (CET) prime minister Mark Rutte receives the heads of delegation at the World Forum Convention Centre in The Hague.
- The session is opened at 3:00 pm (CET).
- The conference continues at 3:30 pm (CET) behind closed doors. Press briefings and bilateral meetings are also held.
- King Willem-Alexander receives the heads of delegation at Huis ten Bosch for a joint dinner from 7:00 pm (CET).

Additionally, an emergency meeting of the G7 took place at 6:30 pm (CET) at the Catshuis (the official residence of the prime minister) to discuss the annexation of Ukrainian Crimea by Russia. Prior to the meeting, British prime minister David Cameron announced that the upcoming G8 meeting in June that was planned to be held in Russia will not occur in that country due to its annexation of Crimea.

=== March 25 ===
The summit continued the next day with the following events:

- The days starts with informal discussion on the future of the Nuclear Security Summit process at 10:00 am (CET).
- From 10:10 am (CET) press briefings and bilateral meetings will be held.
- The official group photo with the heads of delegation is taken at 12:15 pm (CET).
- At 3:15 pm (CET) the session will be closed.
- Final press conferences will follow starting at 4:00 pm (CET).

== Summit consequences ==
=== Japanese turnover of nuclear material ===
Japan welcomed the opening of the summit with the pledge that it agreed to transfer to the US a (relatively small) part of its nuclear material: more than 700 pounds of weapons-grade plutonium and a large quantity of highly enriched uranium, a decades-old research stockpile allegedly of American and British origin, said to be large enough "to build dozens of nuclear weapons", according to American and Japanese officials. The amount of highly enriched uranium had not been announced, but was estimated in the press at 450 pounds.

This announcement was considered the biggest single success in the five-year-long push of US President Obama to secure the most dangerous materials. Since he began the meetings with world leaders, 13 states had eliminated their caches of nuclear materials and many more improved the security measures around their storage facilities, to prevent theft by potential terrorists.

For years, Japan's stockpiles of weapons-grade material were not a secret, but its security of its stockpiles was criticized, and Iran had cited Japan's stockpiles of bomb-ready material as "evidence of a double standard" about which states could be trusted. In February 2014, China began denouncing Japan's supply, in apparent warning that a nationalistic turn in Japanese politics could result in the country seeking its own weapons.

At various moments right-wing politicians in Japan had referred to the stockpile as a deterrent, suggesting that it was useful to have material so that the world knows the country could easily fashion it into weapons.

=== Agreements ===
In The Hague Nuclear Security Summit Communiqué, the attending leaders raised the bar by committing to minimise their stockpiles of plutonium, in addition to minimising highly enriched uranium.

Leaders of 35 countries have agreed to adopt the Nuclear Security Guidelines, including Algeria, Armenia, Australia, Belgium, Canada, Chile, Czechia, Denmark, Finland, France, Georgia, Germany, Hungary, Israel, Italy, Japan, Kazakhstan, Lithuania, Mexico, Morocco, the Netherlands, New Zealand, Norway, the Philippines, Poland, Romania, South Korea, Spain, Sweden, Turkey, Ukraine, United Arab Emirates, the United Kingdom, the United States, and Vietnam. The leaders of the remaining 18 countries have refused to adopt the Nuclear Security Guidelines, namely China, Russia, Brazil, India, Indonesia, Saudi Arabia, Switzerland, Argentina, Thailand, South Africa, Malaysia, Nigeria, Singapore, Egypt, Pakistan, Azerbaijan, Jordan, and Gabon.

== 2016 Summit ==
The next Nuclear Security Summit was in 2016, hosted by the United States. During the summit in The Hague, both Washington and Chicago were mentioned as locations.

== Security ==
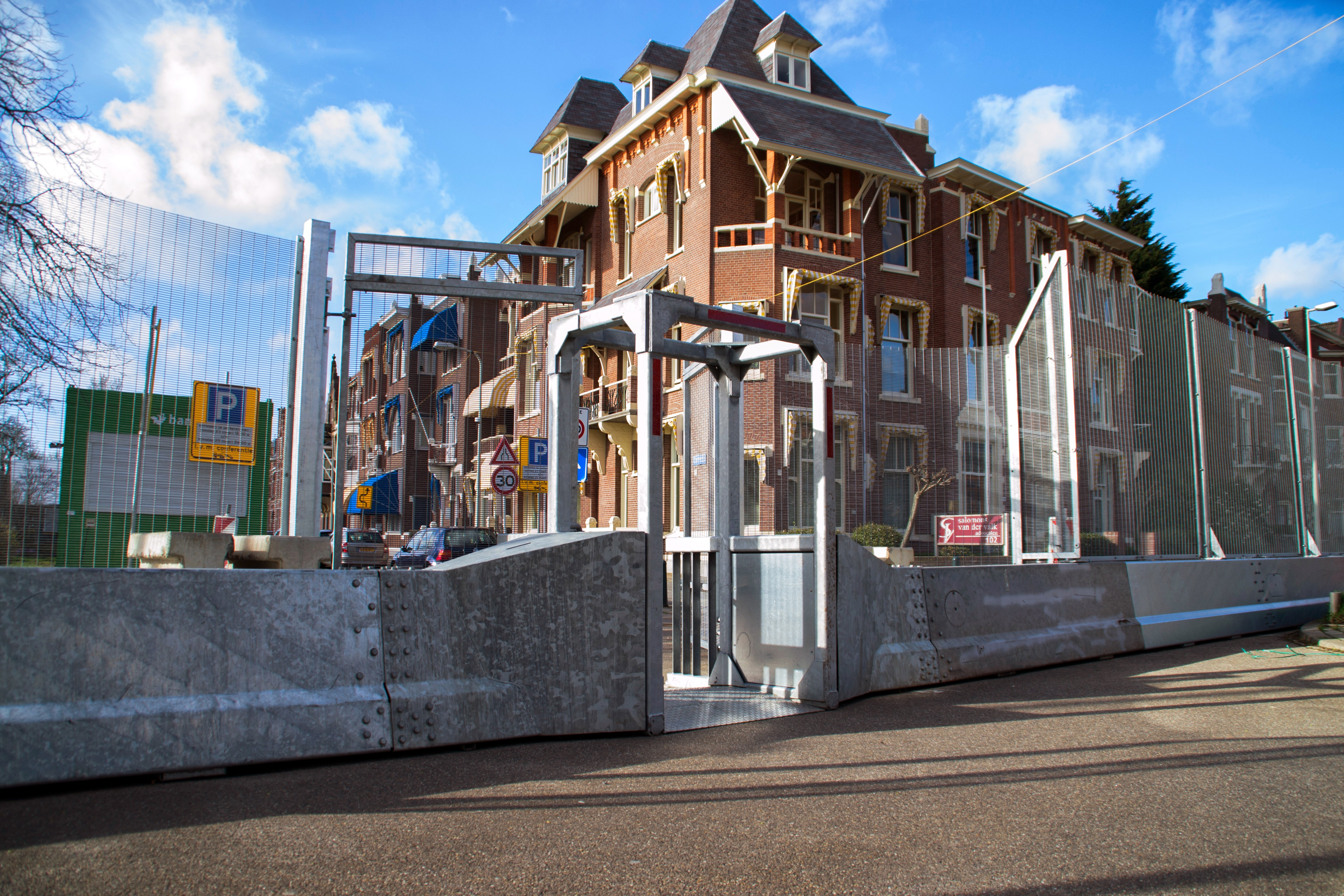
A gate in the security fence that surrounds the World Forum Convention Centre

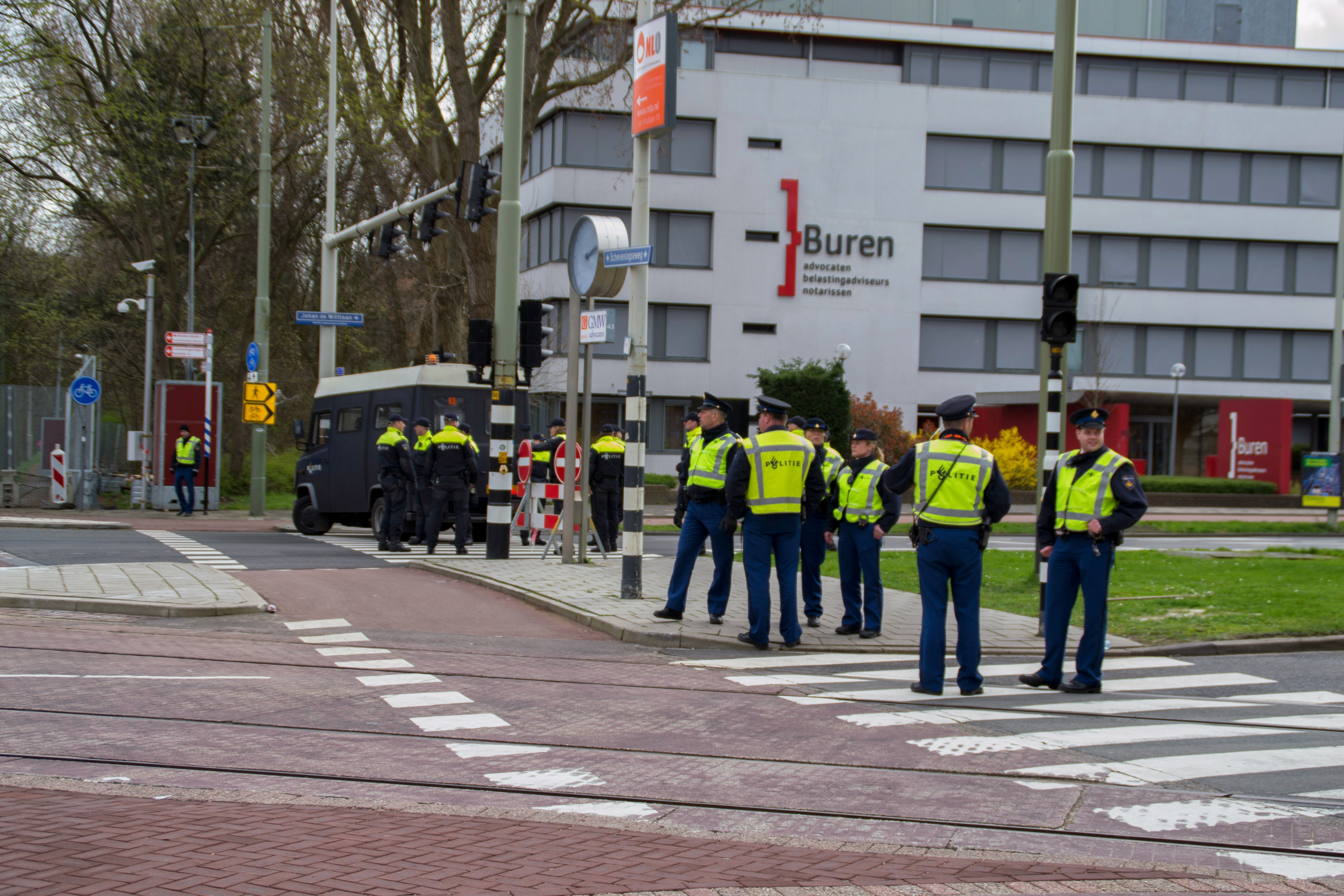
Police officers guarding an access way to the World Forum

With the gathering of 58 high officials, security was an absolute priority. As a result, the security measures taken during the summit were unprecedented for the Netherlands. Around 13,000 police officers (four times the amount as during the royal succession in 2013), 4,000 gendarmes, and 4,000 military personnel were deployed. Several NASAMS air-defence systems were placed at various spots around The Hague and two F-16 fighter jets were permanently patrolling The Hague airspace. More F-16s were on stand-by for interception tasks and came into action on March 24 when a cargo plane unintentionally entered Dutch airspace without permission. Apache helicopters were on stand-by as well, and Cougar and Chinook helicopters were available for transportation needs. Police helicopters were also patrolling the airspace. The offshore patrol vessels HNLMS Holland and HNLMS Friesland guarded the coastline from Hook of Holland to IJmuiden and the Dutch air defence and command frigate HNLMS De Zeven Provinciën guarded airspace. NATO assisted the Dutch military with AWACS airplanes.

The area directly around the World Forum Convention Centre, where the summit was held, was completely closed off with fences borrowed from the UK which were previously used at the 2012 Summer Olympics in London. Because of the heavy security precautions, a number of roads around the World Forum and some major motorways between Schiphol Airport and The Hague were partially or completely closed for regular traffic. It was feared that these measures would lead to severe traffic jams in the busy Randstad metropolitan area, but the amount of traffic was less than expected on the first day of the summit and major problems did not occur, presumably due to the government's advice for commuters to avoid the densely populated Randstad region or to make use of public transport instead.

Even though no major security incidents took place during the duration of the summit, it was reported that two students managed to get access to the final press conference by disguising themselves as journalists. The students came as close as five metres from President Barack Obama and Prime Minister Mark Rutte. The Dutch Organisation of Journalists (Dutch: Nederlandse Vereniging van Journalisten) admitted a mistake was made and that it would evaluate and improve the process of obtaining a student press pass. According to a spokesperson of the Ministry of Foreign Affairs the breach was not a serious security risk and the security of President Barack Obama was optimal.

== See also ==
- Global Initiative to Combat Nuclear Terrorism
- Nuclear disarmament
  - New START
- Nuclear proliferation
- Proliferation Security Initiative
