= HNLMS Van Amstel (F831) =

Frigate of the Royal Netherlands Navy

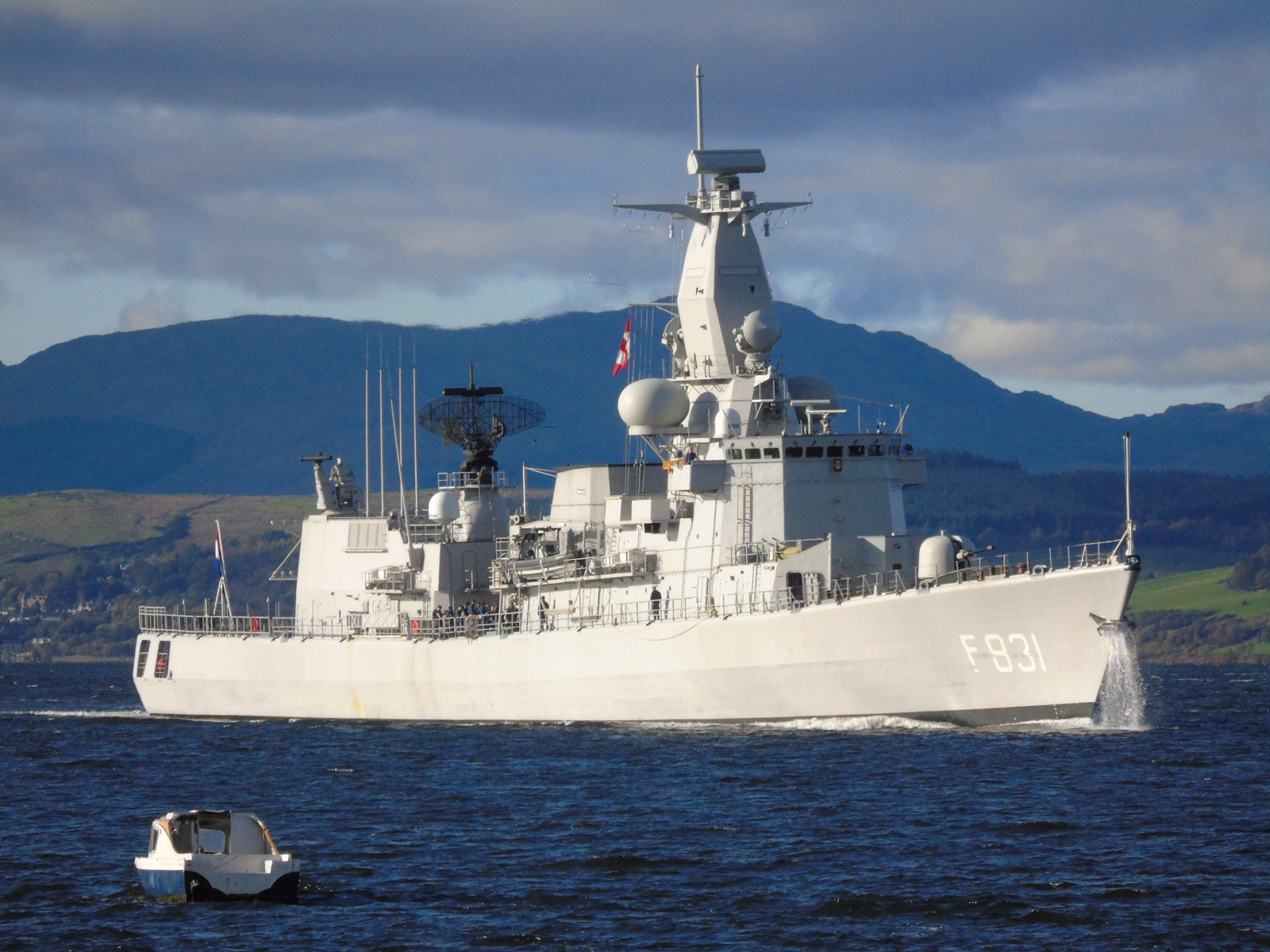

History

Netherlands
- Name: HNLMS Van Amstel
- Namesake: Jan van Amstel
- Builder: Koninklijke Schelde Groep, Vlissingen
- Laid down: 3 May 1987
- Launched: 19 May 1990
- Commissioned: 27 May 1993
- Identification: MMSI number: 245965000; Callsign: PAME
- Status: in active service
- Badge

General characteristics
- Class & type: Karel Doorman-class frigate
- Displacement: 3,300 tons
- Length: 122 m (400 ft 3 in)
- Beam: 14.4 m (47 ft 3 in)
- Draught: 6.2 m (20 ft 4 in)
- Propulsion: 2 Rolls-Royce (Spey 1A) 12,500 kW (16,700 hp) gas turbines; 2 Stork-Werkspoor 3,650 kW (4,895 hp) diesel engines
- Speed: 29 knots (54 km/h; 33 mph) (gas turbines); 21 knots (39 km/h; 24 mph) (diesels)
- Range: 5,000 nmi (9,300 km; 5,800 mi) at 18 kn (33 km/h; 21 mph)
- Endurance: 30 days
- Complement: 154
- Sensors & processing systems: Thales Nederland LW-08 early warning radar; Thales Nederland SMART-S 3-D air-search; SeaWatcher 100 active phased array surface detection and tracking radar; Thales Gatekeeper; Staring Electro-Optic Ship Security System; Thales Scout surface search radar; 2 × Thales STIR-18 fire control radar; Decca 1609/9 navigation radar; PHS-36 active bow sonar
- Electronic warfare & decoys: Thales Vigile APX Radar Electronic Support Measures
- Armament: 1 × Oto Melara 76 mm anti-air/anti-surface gun; 16-cell Mark 48 Vertical Launch System (VLS) - 16 Sea Sparrow missile; 8 × Harpoon anti-ship missiles; 1 × Goalkeeper CIWS (point defence gun); 4 × Mk 32 324 mm torpedo tubes, Mark 46 torpedoes
- Aircraft carried: NH90 NFH (as of 2013) helicopter

HNLMS Van Amstel (F831) is a ship of the Karel Doorman-class of multi-purpose frigates (also known as "M-fregat" class) of the Royal Netherlands Navy. Built by the shipyard Koninklijke Schelde Groep in Vlissingen. The ship is named after the Dutch Captain Jan van Amstel.

== History ==
=== 1990s ===
In 1995 the ship assisted in the response after Hurricane Luis at the island of Sint Maarten in the Netherlands Antilles.

=== 2000s ===
The ship was deployed in a multinational force in the Oman Sea in 2001/2002 in Operation Enduring Freedom.

In September 2005 the ship assisted in the Dutch response to Hurricane Katrina by sending its sailors ashore to southern Mississippi to distribute aid supplies to hurricane victims in conjunction with Mexican marines, U.S. Navy sailors, and U.S. Marines.

=== 2010s ===
On 11 May 2012, Van Amstel apprehended 11 Somali pirates after the ship's Lynx helicopter sighted a suspicious fishing dhow towing two skiffs, 400 nautical miles (740 km; 460 mi) off the Somali coast. When the ship's boarding team approached the dhow, the team found 11 suspected pirates of Somali origin and a total of 17 hostages on board. After taking the suspected pirates to the Van Amstel, the boarding team found significant evidence that linked the 11 men to an armed attack on the motor tanker Super Lady a few days prior. The 17 hostages were freed. They were Iranian fishermen.

In 2016, Van Amstel joined Standing NATO Maritime Group 2 (SNMG2). That same year Van Amstel also rescued migrants in the Mediterranean Sea.

In April 2017, Van Amstel seized nearly 700 kilograms (1,500 lb) of cocaine in two separate drug busts. The busts happened in waters between Curaçao and Colombia.

From 26 June to 6 July 2018, Van Amstel participated in Exercise Dynamic Mongoose 2018 along with units from other nations.

=== 2020s ===
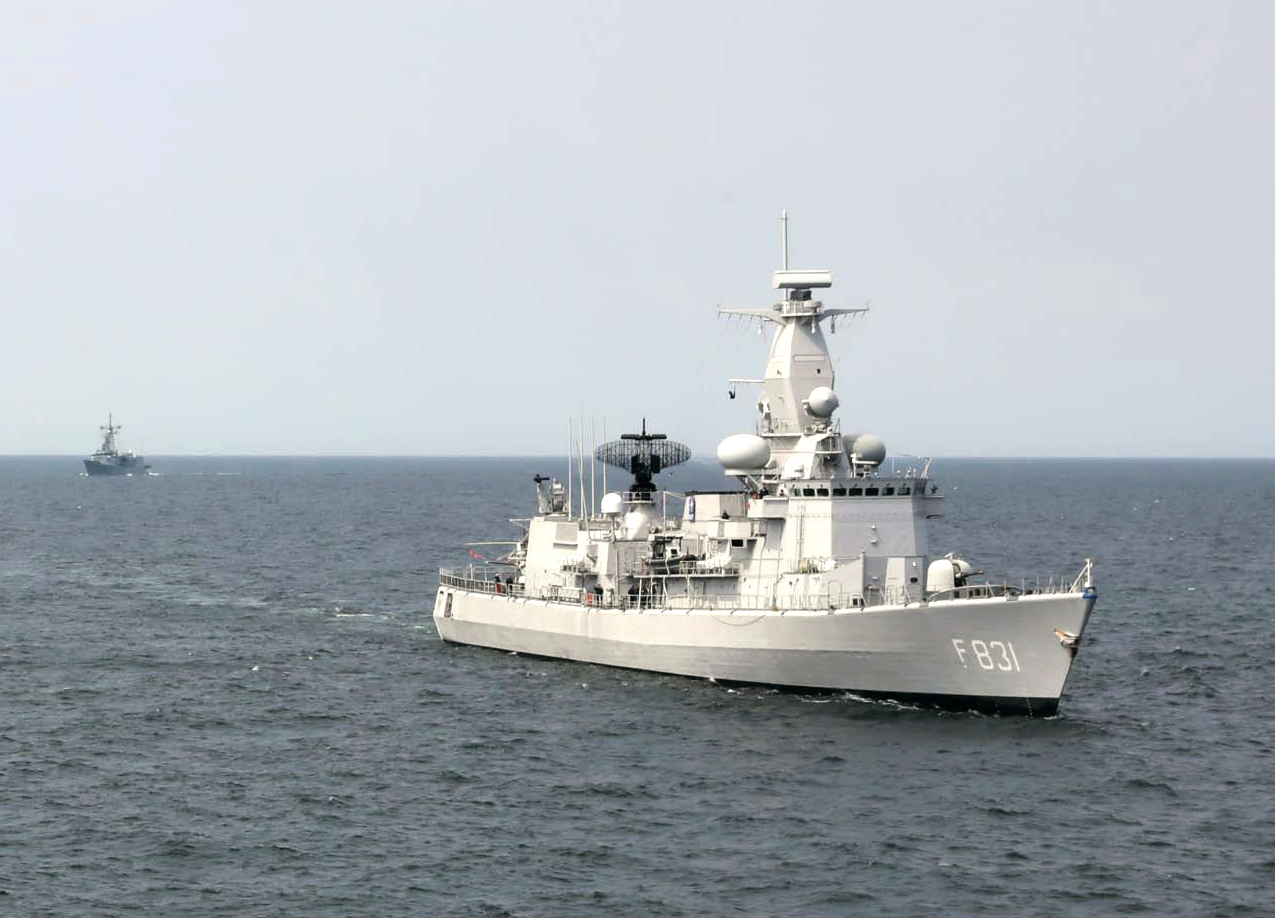
Van Amstel on 23 May 2023

In May 2022, Van Amstel participated in the Mjølner exercise off Andøy Island, Norway.

On 9 October 2022, Van Amstel along with HNLMS De Zeven Provinciën deployed to conduct drills with the aircraft carrier USS Gerald R. Ford.

In June 2025 Van Amstel, together with HNLMS De Ruyter, participated in the maritime combat exercise Polaris. Two months later, in August 2025, Van Amstel departed Den Helder for the Dutch Caribbean. During her time there she operated as temporary guard ship. At the end of September Van Amstel left the Caribbean for the Netherlands after she was replaced by Groningen as guard ship.

On 10 November 2025 Van Amstel replaced Johan de Witt as flagship of Standing NATO Maritime Group One (SNMG1). That same month she took, as flagship, part in the anti-submarine warfare exercise Playbook Merlin 2025. During that exercise Van Amstel hunted on German and Swedish submarines. She also patrolled, together with the German frigate Hamburg and HMCS St. John's, the waters between Svalbard and Norway.

In May 2026 Van Amstel took part in the anti-submarine warfare exercise Riptide near Stavanger. She will also take part in exercise Dynamic Mongoose, while being part of SNMG1. On 17 July 2026 Van Amstel returned to Den Helder.
