= Friesland, Wisconsin =

- Village
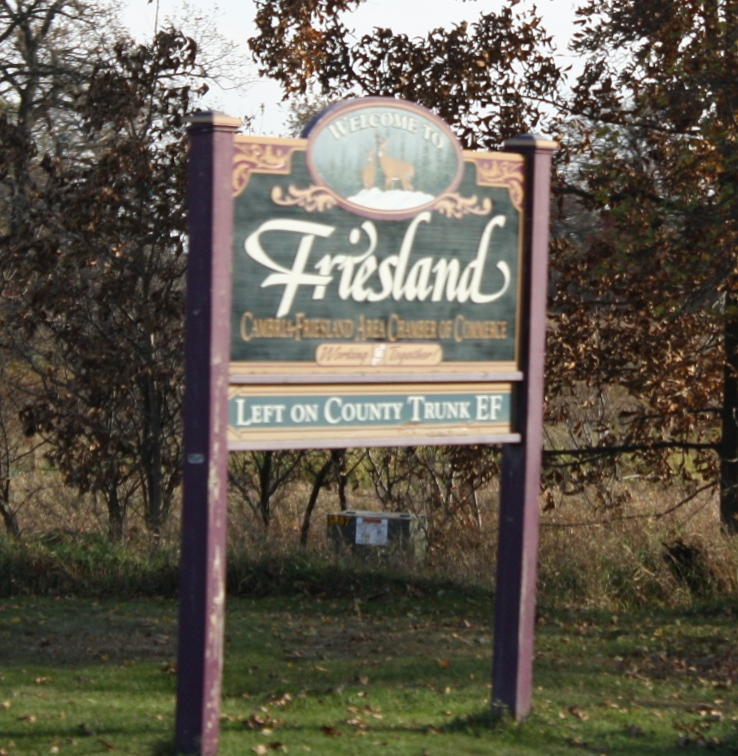

- Location of Friesland in Columbia County, Wisconsin
- Coordinates: 43°35′20″N 89°4′4″W
- Country: United States
- State: Wisconsin
- County: Columbia

Area
  - Total: 1.01 sq mi (2.62 km^{2})
  - Land: 1.00 sq mi (2.59 km^{2})
  - Water: 0.012 sq mi (0.03 km^{2})
- Elevation: 1,007 ft (307 m)

Population (2020)
  - Total: 320
  - Density: 345/sq mi (133.2/km^{2})
- Time zone: UTC-6 (Central (CST))
  - Summer (DST): UTC-5 (CDT)
- FIPS code: 55-28000
- GNIS feature ID: 1565337
- Website: Village of Friesland

Friesland is a village in Columbia County, Wisconsin, United States. The population was 320 at the 2020 census. It is part of the Madison Metropolitan Statistical Area, and was named after Friesland, one of the twelve provinces of the Netherlands.

== Geography ==
Friesland is located at 43°35′20″N 89°4′4″W (43.588986, -89.067871).

According to the United States Census Bureau, the village has a total area of 1.03 square miles (2.67 km^{2}), of which 1.02 square miles (2.64 km^{2}) is land and 0.01 square miles (0.03 km^{2}) is water.

== Demographics ==
Historical population
Census	Pop.	Note	%±
1950	311		—
1960	308		−1.0%
1970	301		−2.3%
1980	267		−11.3%
1990	271		1.5%
2000	298		10.0%
2010	356		19.5%
2020	320		−10.1%
U.S. Decennial Census

=== 2010 census ===
As of the census of 2010, there were 356 people, 131 households, and 95 families living in the village. The population density was 349 inhabitants per square mile (134.7/km^{2}). There were 141 housing units at an average density of 138.2 per square mile (53.4/km^{2}). The racial makeup of the village was 96.3% White, 1.4% African American, 0.6% Native American, 0.3% Asian, and 1.4% from two or more races. Hispanic or Latino people of any race were 4.2% of the population.

There were 131 households, of which 34.4% had children under the age of 18 living with them, 64.9% were married couples living together, 4.6% had a female householder with no husband present, 3.1% had a male householder with no wife present, and 27.5% were non-families. 22.1% of all households were made up of individuals, and 13.7% had someone living alone who was 65 years of age or older. The average household size was 2.72 and the average family size was 3.19.

The median age in the village was 35.2 years. 26.4% of residents were under the age of 18; 9% were between the ages of 18 and 24; 25.9% were from 25 to 44; 24.7% were from 45 to 64; and 14% were 65 years of age or older. The gender makeup of the village was 48.6% male and 51.4% female.

=== 2000 census ===
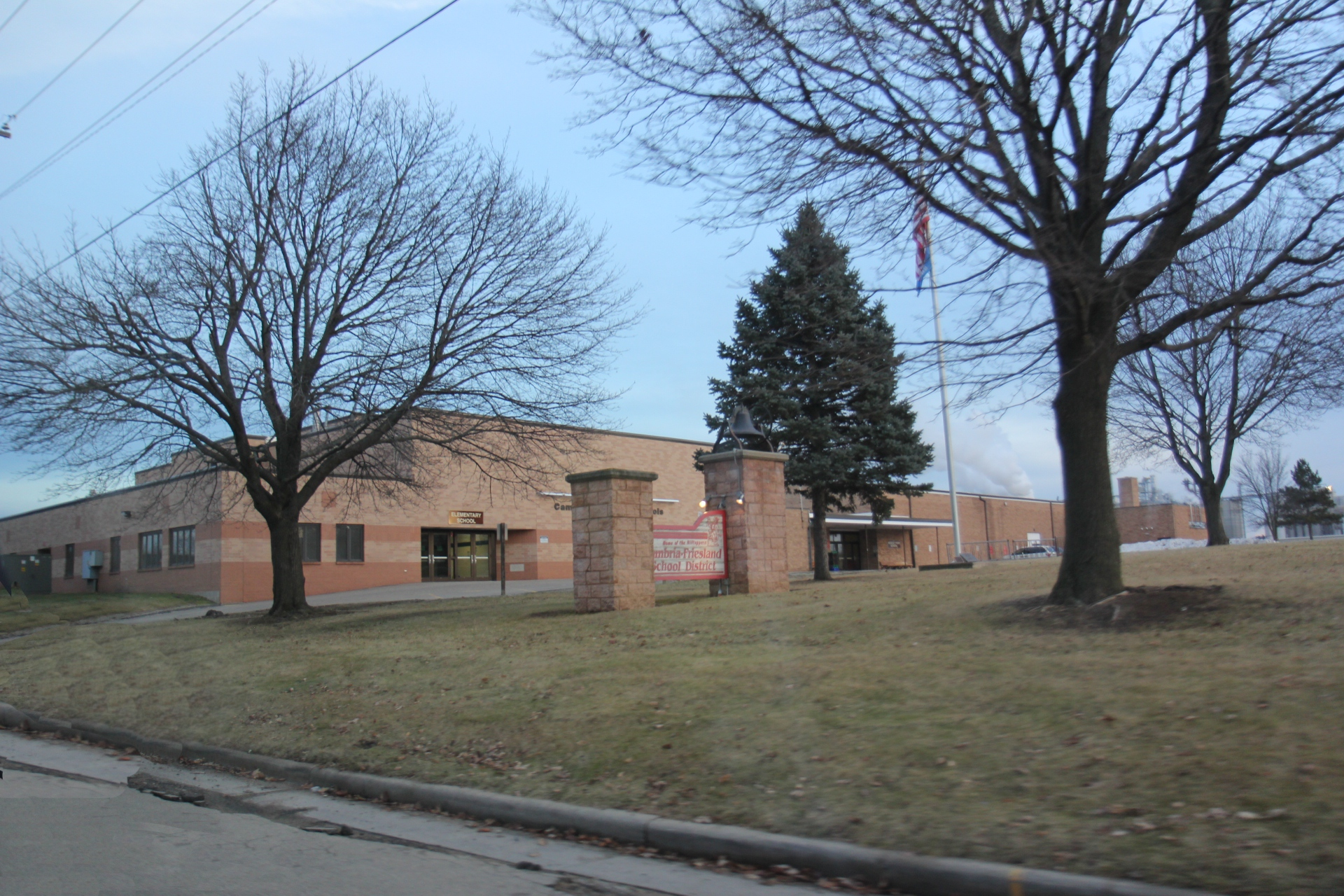
Cambria / Friesland School

As of the census of 2000, there were 298 people, 109 households, and 89 families living in the village. The population density was 290.1 people per square mile (111.7/km^{2}). There were 114 housing units at an average density of 111 per square mile (42.7/km^{2}). The racial makeup of the village was 98.66% White, 0.34% Asian, and 1.01% from two or more races. Hispanic or Latino people of any race were 1.01% of the population.

There were 109 households, out of which 36.7% had children under the age of 18 living with them, 75.2% were married couples living together, 5.5% had a female householder with no husband present, and 18.3% were non-families. 17.4% of all households were made up of individuals, and 9.2% had someone living alone who was 65 years of age or older. The average household size was 2.73 and the average family size was 3.09.

In the village, the population was spread out, with 28.5% under the age of 18, 7.4% from 18 to 24, 27.5% from 25 to 44, 19.8% from 45 to 64, and 16.8% who were 65 years of age or older. The median age was 38 years. For every 100 females, there were 88.6 males. For every 100 females age 18 and over, there were 99.1 males.

The median income for a household in the village was $42,500, and the median income for a family was $45,000. Males had a median income of $34,063 versus $20,000 for females. The per capita income for the village was $17,035. About 1% of families and 1.5% of the population were below the poverty line, including no people under age 18 and 5.5% of those 65 or over.

== See also ==
- Friesland
