= Freesia (disambiguation) =

Freesia is a plant genus in the family Iridaceae.

Freesia may also refer to:

- Freesia (manga), a Japanese manga series
- Freesia alba, a species of the plant genus Freesia
- Freesia laxa, a species of the plant genus Freesia

== See also ==
- Frisia (disambiguation)
- Phreesia, a healthcare software company
