= HNLMS Holland (P840) =

Offshore patrol vessel

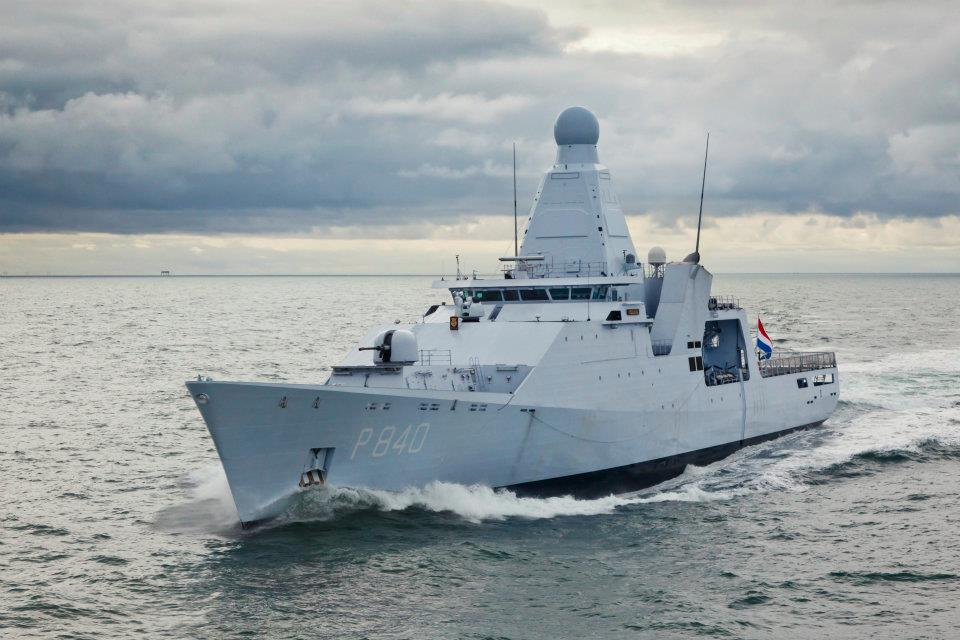
- HNLMS Holland (Min. of Defence)

History

Netherlands
- Name: Holland
- Namesake: Holland
- Builder: Damen Group
- Laid down: 8 December 2008
- Launched: 2 February 2010
- Commissioned: 6 July 2012
- Status: In maintenance
- Badge

General characteristics
- Class & type: Holland-class offshore patrol vessel
- Displacement: approx. 3,750 tons full load
- Length: 108.4 m (355 ft 8 in)
- Beam: 16 m (52 ft 6 in)
- Draught: 4.55 m (14 ft 11 in)
- Propulsion: RENK CODELOD; 2x MAN 12V28/33D diesel engines (5460KW each)
- Speed: 21.5 knots (39.8 km/h; 24.7 mph)
- Range: 5,000 nautical miles (9,300 km; 5,800 mi) at 15 knots (28 km/h; 17 mph)
- Endurance: 21 days
- Boats & landing craft carried: 1 × Fast Rescue Boat (FRB); 2 × Fast Raiding Interception and Special Forces Craft (FRISC)
- Complement: 54 (+ additional space for 40)
- Sensors & processing systems: Thales Integrated Mast; SeaMaster 400 SMILE non-rotating air warning radar; SeaWatcher 100 active phased array surface detection and tracking radar; GateKeeper Electro-optical 360° surveillance system
- Armament: Guns: 1 × 76 mm Oto Melara Super Rapid; 1 × 30 mm Oto Melara Marlin WS; 2 × 12.7 mm Oto Melara Hitrole NT; 6 × 7.62 mm FN MAG machine guns
- Aircraft carried: 1 x NH90 NFH helicopter
- Aviation facilities: fully equipped hangar and flight deck for one medium-sized helicopter

HNLMS Holland is the first ship of the Holland-class offshore patrol vessels of the Royal Netherlands Navy. The ship was originally designed to fulfill patrol and intervention tasks against lightly armed opponents, such as pirates and smugglers. However, it also has very advanced electronic and radar surveillance capabilities which are used for military stabilization and security roles, short of outright war. Without sonar or long range weapons, it utilizes the surveillance capabilities of the Thales integrated mast, which integrates communication systems and two 4-faced phased arrays for air and surface search.

== Service history ==
Holland was the first ship of the Holland-class offshore patrol vessels to enter service. The ship fulfilled its first task before it had actually entered service when on 15 March 2012 it returned a mirror that had been taken from Royal Charles after the Raid on the Medway.

In 2013 Holland successfully intercepted two illegal drug transports in the Dutch Caribbean. One of the cargoholds contained more than 2,000 pounds (910 kg) of cocaine.

During the Nuclear Security Summit in 2014, Holland and Friesland secured the coastal areas between IJmuiden and Hook of Holland.

On 10 October 2016, Holland was deployed around Haiti, to help after the impact of Hurricane Mathew.

In July 2018, the crew of HNLMS Holland ended a three-month drug patrol in the Dutch Caribbean with a visit to New York. While in the Caribbean Sea, Holland also performed coast guard duties. Holland's sister ship Friesland replaced the vessel in the Caribbean.

In August 2021, Holland was deployed to Haiti once more to support an EU Civil Protection Mechanism mission in response to the 2021 Haiti earthquake and subsequent Tropical depression, providing intelligence-gathering, safety, helicopter, and security support including an armed team.

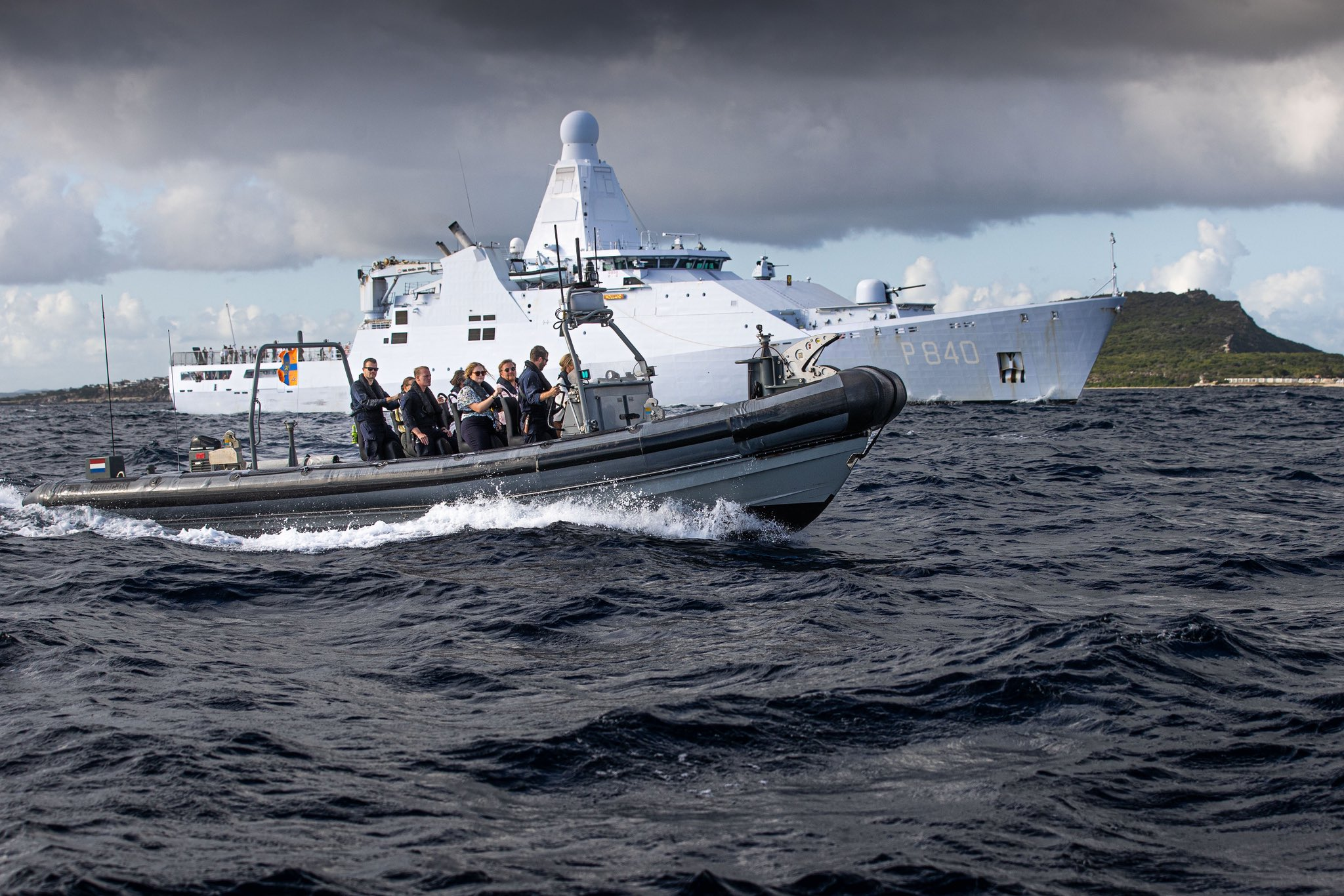
The Royal Family on a FRISC with HNLMS Holland in the background

In February 2023 the Holland was used to ferry King Willem-Alexander, Queen Maxima and Princess of Orange Catharina-Amalia from Aruba to Curaçao during a state visit to the Dutch Caribbean. During the transfer the Royal Family also went for a ride onboard one of the Hollands FRISCS.

On 8 September 2025 Holland arrived at Royal IHC to undergo her midlife upgrade, which will include renewal of all paint and preservation systems as well as several upgrades to enhance the capabilities of the ship. It is expected that she will be operational again in 2027.

== See also ==
- HNLMS Zeeland (P841)
- HNLMS Friesland (P842)
- HNLMS Groningen (P843)
