= Frisia (disambiguation) =

Frisia is a coastal region in northwest Europe.

Frisia may also refer to: States and regions

- County of East Frisia, a state of the Holy Roman Empire
- East Frisia, a historic region in Germany
- Friesland, a province of the Netherlands
- Frisian freedom, an autonomous region of the Holy Roman Empire
- Kingdom of Frisia, a medieval kingdom between 600 and 734
- North Frisia, a region in Germany
- Seignory of Frisia, a feudal domain in the Netherlands
- Tota Frisia or Seven Frisian Sea-lands, a semi-legendary concept referring to a loose confederation of Frisian territories during the early medieval period
- West Frisia, a region in the Netherlands

Other

- Donato Frisia (1883–1953), an Italian painter
- Frisia Museum or Scheringa Museum of Realist Art, a former museum in the Netherlands
- Frisia Tree or Robinia pseudoacacia, a species of the tree genus Robinia

== See also ==
- Freesia (disambiguation)
- Friesland (disambiguation)
