= Holland-class patrol vessel =

Four ocean-going patrol vessels constructed for the Royal Netherlands Navy

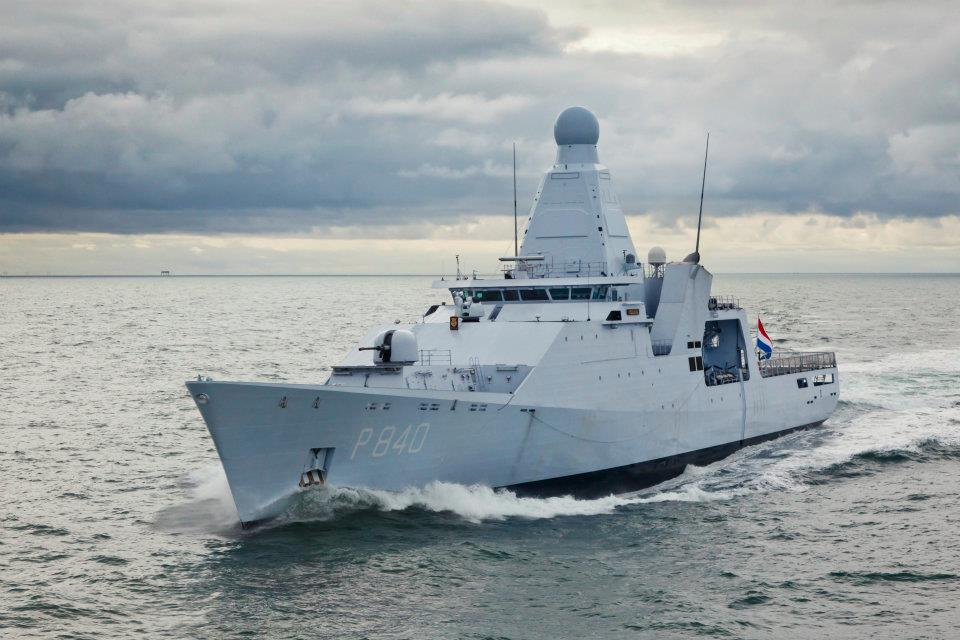
- HNLMS Holland

Class overview
- Builders: Damen Shipyards Galați, Romania; Damen Schelde Naval Shipbuilding, Netherlands (fitting out)
- Operators: Royal Netherlands Navy
- Succeeded by: ATS class
- Cost: €467.8 million (2007) for 4 units; €116.95 million (2007) per unit
- In commission: 2012–present
- Completed: 4
- Active: 3
- Laid up: 1

General characteristics
- Type: Ocean-going patrol vessel
- Displacement: approx. 3,750 tons full load
- Length: 108.4 m (355 ft 8 in)
- Beam: 16 m (52 ft 6 in)
- Draught: 4.55 m (14 ft 11 in)
- Propulsion: RENK CODELOD; 2x MAN 12V28/33D diesel engines (5460KW each)
- Speed: 21.5 knots (39.8 km/h; 24.7 mph)
- Range: 5,000 nmi (9,300 km; 5,800 mi) at 15 knots (28 km/h; 17 mph)
- Endurance: 21 days
- Boats & landing craft carried: 1 × Fast Rescue Boat (FRB); 2 × Fast Raiding Interception and Special Forces Craft (FRISC)
- Complement: 54 (+ additional space for 40)
- Sensors & processing systems: Thales Integrated Mast; SeaMaster 400 SMILE non-rotating air warning radar; SeaWatcher 100 active phased array surface detection and tracking radar; GateKeeper Electro-optical 360° surveillance system
- Armament: Guns: 1 × 76 mm Oto Melara Super Rapid; 1 × 30 mm Oto Melara Marlin WS; 2 × 12.7 mm Oto Melara Hitrole NT; 6 × 7.62 mm FN MAG machine guns
- Aircraft carried: 1 x NH90 NFH helicopter
- Aviation facilities: fully equipped hangar and flight deck for one medium-sized helicopter

The Holland-class ocean-going patrol vessels are a class of four ocean-going patrol vessels constructed for the Royal Netherlands Navy. They are designed to fulfill patrol and intervention tasks against lightly armed opponents, such as pirates and smugglers, but have much higher level electronic and radar surveillance capabilities which are used for military stabilization and security roles, short of outright war. Without sonar or long range weapons, they utilize the surveillance capabilities of the Thales integrated mast, which integrates communication systems and two four-faced phased arrays for air and surface search.

== History ==
A contract between the Royal Netherlands Navy and Damen Schelde Naval Shipbuilding in Vlissingen, the Netherlands was signed in 2007 for the construction of four vessels at a total cost of €467.8 million.

The vessels resulted from the Dutch Ministry of Defence's Marinestudie. The study proposes the sale of four existing Karel Doorman-class frigates, and using the proceeds and savings of the sale to commission four dedicated patrol vessels, allow the building of a more capable joint support ship to replace the auxiliary replenishment ship HNLMS Zuiderkruis, and reintroducing a mine-sweeping capability to the Dutch Navy.

The vessels are designed for global use, in particular to be deployed to the Caribbean region, the South China Sea and the North Sea. When deployed to the Caribbean, they operate in conjunction with the Dutch Caribbean Coast Guard. The ships have the capability to carry out missions such as anti-piracy and blockade duties, and also can be used for emergency transport. They are constructed with heavier mild steel and armour, which results in a more robust ship of greater weight, than the previous M class frigates.

== Armament ==
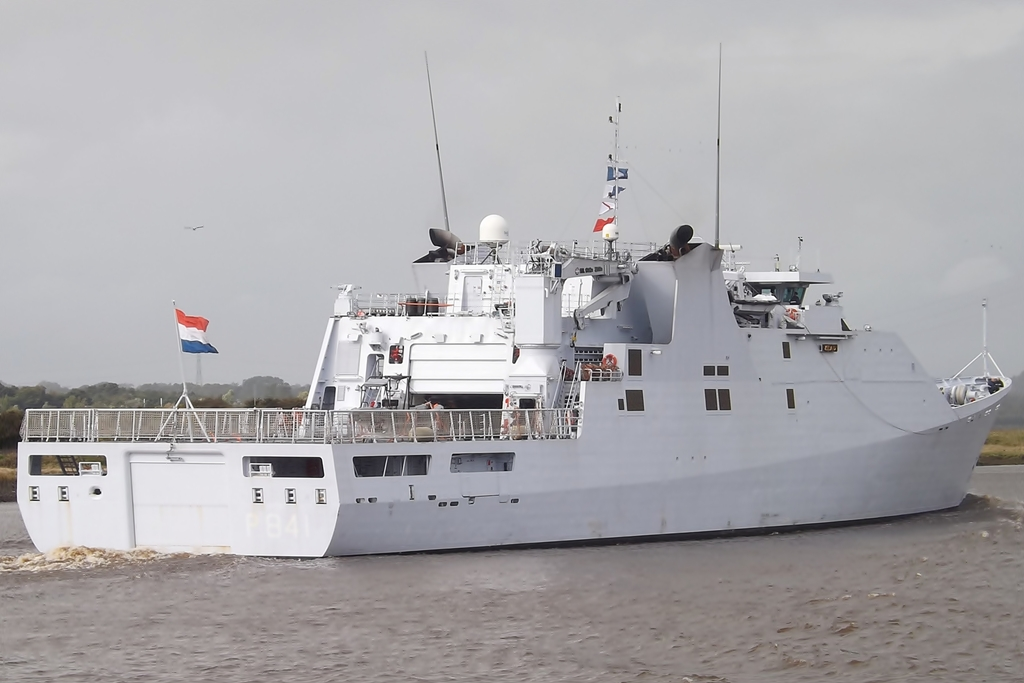
HNLMS Zeeland

Due to their size and sensor suite, the OPVs can be compared to corvettes and frigates. However, their relatively light armament does not fit with that qualification. The Holland class' main armament is a 76 mm (3.0 in) Oto Melara Super Rapid gun with a firing rate of 120 rounds per minute and a maximum range of 16 km (9.9 mi).

The cannon is adequate for deployment against smuggling vessels (such as interception of drug transports with fast speed boats in the Caribbean). Secondary armament is provided by a 30 mm (1.2 in) Oto Melara Marlin WS autocannon, two 12.7 mm (0.50 in) Oto Melara Hitrole NTs and two 12.7 mm M2HB machine guns. All can be remotely operated. Two water cannon are used for non-lethal protection and fire fighting. In addition, there are six stations for hand-operated FN MAG-7.62 mm machine guns.

For the interception of fast speedboats (which after all are faster than the OPV), two FRISC's (Fast Raiding Interception Special forces Craft) are transported, capable of reaching speeds greater than 40 knots. One of them is carried in davits, the other in a small dock (a slipway) on the stern (below the helideck). The ships also received a Combat Management System (CMS) from CAMS-Force Vision.

== Sensor suite ==
The ships are able to monitor to 250 km (160 mi) range air, missile and UAV targets, and to 70 km (43 mi) range surface targets using a Thales Integrated Sensor and Communication Systems (ISCS), comprising a SeaMaster 400 air warning radar, a Watcher 100 active phased-array surface detection and tracking radar (claimed to be able to detect small objects such as mines and periscopes on the sea surface at 40 km (25 mi) range). It has link 11 & 16 data links a mine detection sonar and an infra-red Gatekeeper/electro-optical (EO) warning system.

The sensor systems are housed in an integrated mast, also provided by Thales, called the I-Mast 400. Thales also built the satellite communications system for the ships.

== Propulsion ==
The Holland class is fitted with a combined electric or diesel (CODELOD) propulsion system. The gears manufactured by RENK combine one MAN 12V28/33D diesel rated at 5,460 kW (7,320 hp) and a 400 kW (540 hp) electric motor driving a controllable-pitch propeller on each of the two shafts. The electric motor is used mainly for low-speed operations.

== Specifications ==
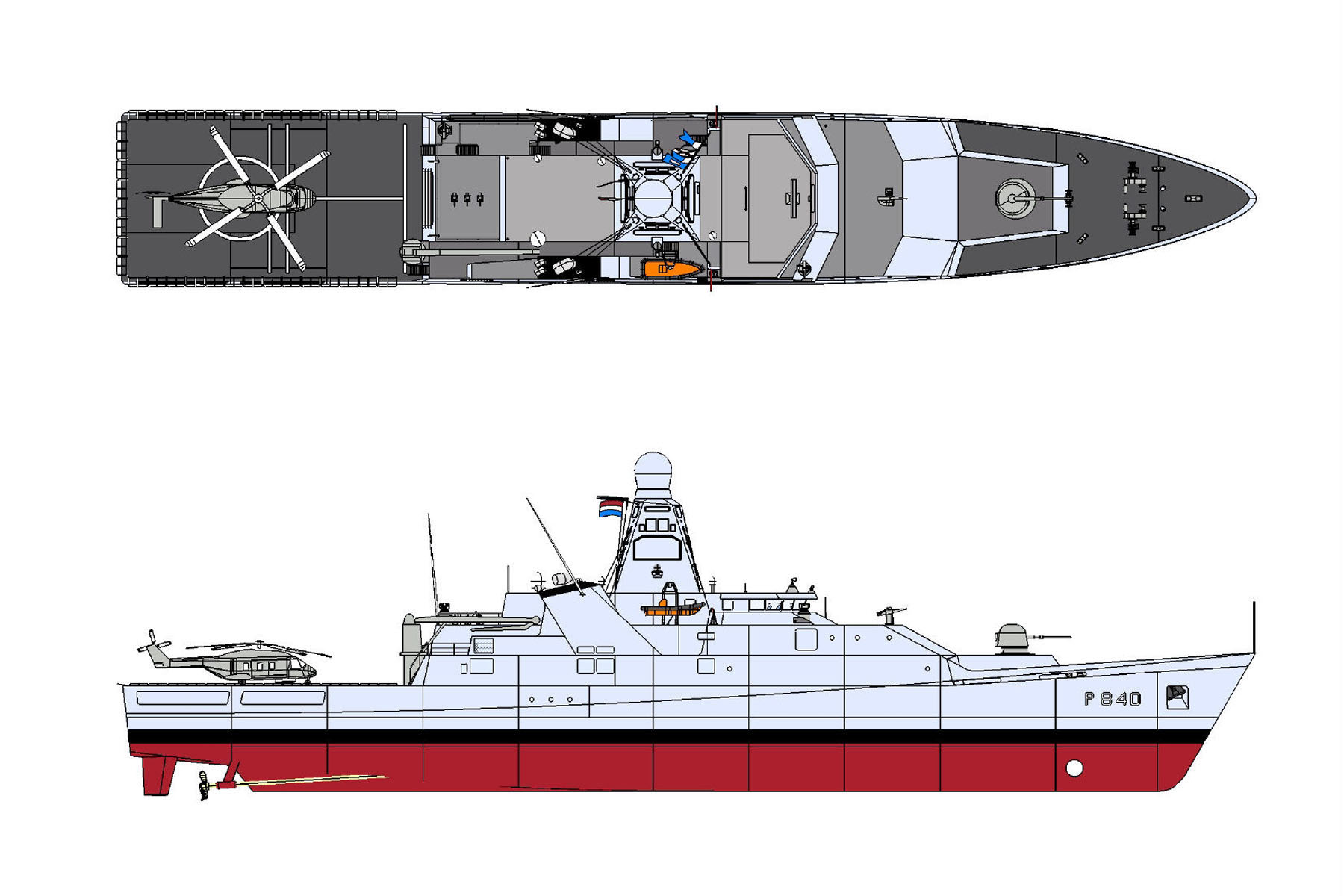
Layout of the Holland-class OPV

Holland-class ships have a tonnage of 3,750 tons, are 108.4 metres (355 ft 8 in) in length, 16 metres (52 ft 6 in) in beam and have a draft of 4.55 metres (14 ft 11 in). The ships have a speed of 21.5 knots (39.8 km/h; 24.7 mph) and a range of 5,000 nautical miles (9,300 km; 5,800 mi) at 15 knots (28 km/h; 17 mph). The ship's complement is 52, as well as up to 39 people for duties such as helicopter or medical crew.

=== Other characteristics ===
The ships are built to a design that is intended to reduce the ability of radar to detect them, as well improving seakeeping by locating the superstructure unusually far aft. The ships are painted a new light blue-gray color, which supposedly has a better camouflage-effect than the standard light-grey paint used by other RNLN ships. The ships have a hangar and flightdeck for an NH90 NFH helicopter and also carry two Fast Raiding Interception Special forces Craft (FRISC), with a speed of more than 40 knots (74 km/h; 46 mph).

Beside these special forces crafts, the Holland class has an improved internal communication infrastructure and is more resistant to the use of resources that are characteristic for asymmetric warfare.

== Ships in class ==
On 20 December 2007, the contract was signed with Dutch-based Damen Schelde Naval Shipbuilding for four ships at a cost of around €467.8 million.

While the first two vessels were built at the Vlissingen shipyard in the Netherlands, to save cost and speed up completion the remainder of the class were assembled at Damen Schelde's shipyard in Galati in Romania. The Thales I-mast is a separate, air-tight module which was built separately from the rest of the ships and then bolted on once complete. Friesland was actually commissioned before her mast was installed.

The ships were named after Dutch provinces of historical maritime importance.

Pennant number	Ship	Laid down	Launched	Commissioned
P840	Holland	8 December 2008	2 February 2010	6 July 2012
P841	Zeeland	5 October 2009	20 November 2010	23 August 2013
P842	Friesland	26 November 2009	4 November 2010	22 January 2013
P843	Groningen	9 April 2010	21 April 2011	29 November 2013

=== Holland ===
Holland was laid down on 8 December 2008, launched on 2 February 2010 and commissioned on 12 May 2011. She was built at the Damen Schelde shipyard in Vlissingen. On 16 November 2011, she was the first ship in her class to receive the Thales Integrated Mast IM-400. The ship entered service during the 2012 Dutch navy days in Den Helder.

=== Zeeland ===
Zeeland was laid down on 5 October 2009 and launched on 20 November 2010. She began sea trials on 31 August 2011. She was built at the Damen Schelde shipyard in Vlissingen. Zeeland was delivered on 20 October 2011, and received her Thales Integrated Mast IM-400 in December 2012. To enter service after final fitting out and finishing trials. Zeeland was commissioned on 23 August 2013 at Vlissingen. In July 2022 Zeeland suffered a fire that caused significant damage. The ship is currently laid up in Den Helder awaiting repairs.

=== Friesland ===
Friesland was laid down on 26 November 2009 and launched on 4 November 2010. She began sea trials on 27 September 2011, and she was delivered to the Defense Material Organisation (DMO) on 11 April 2012. She was built at the Damen Schelde shipyard in Galați. On 26 April 2012, she assisted in the rescue of a sail training vessel off Iona while participating in an international exercise. In January 2013 Friesland became the first of the Holland-class to deploy to the Dutch Caribbean as West Indies Guard Ship.

=== Groningen ===
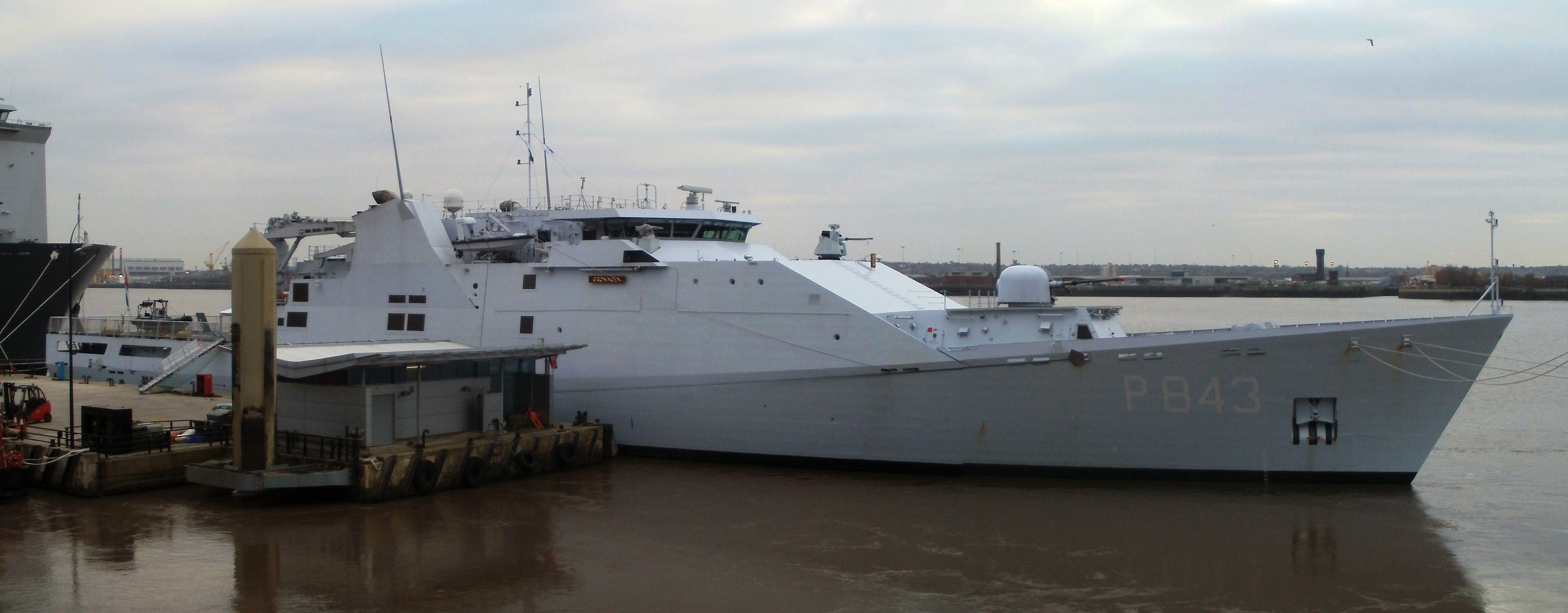
HNLMS Groningen

Groningen was laid down on 9 April 2010 and launched on 21 April 2011. She was built at the Damen Schelde shipyard in Galați.

== Replacement ==
In March 2024, the Dutch Ministry of Defence announced plans to replace the Holland class offshore patrol vessel. In a letter to the Tweede Kamer the State Secretary for Defence stated that the Holland-class, together with the LPDs Rotterdam and Johan de Witt, will be replaced by a single class of six amphibious transport ships. The costs of these six new ships was estimated to be between 1 and 2.5 billion euros. The new ships were expected to enter service starting in 2032, with the last entering service in 2037. This approach was subsequently revised to incorporate the acquisition of four ATS-class amphibious warfare ships, to be procured in cooperation with the United Kingdom.
