= HNLMS Groningen (P843) =

Offshore patrol vessel

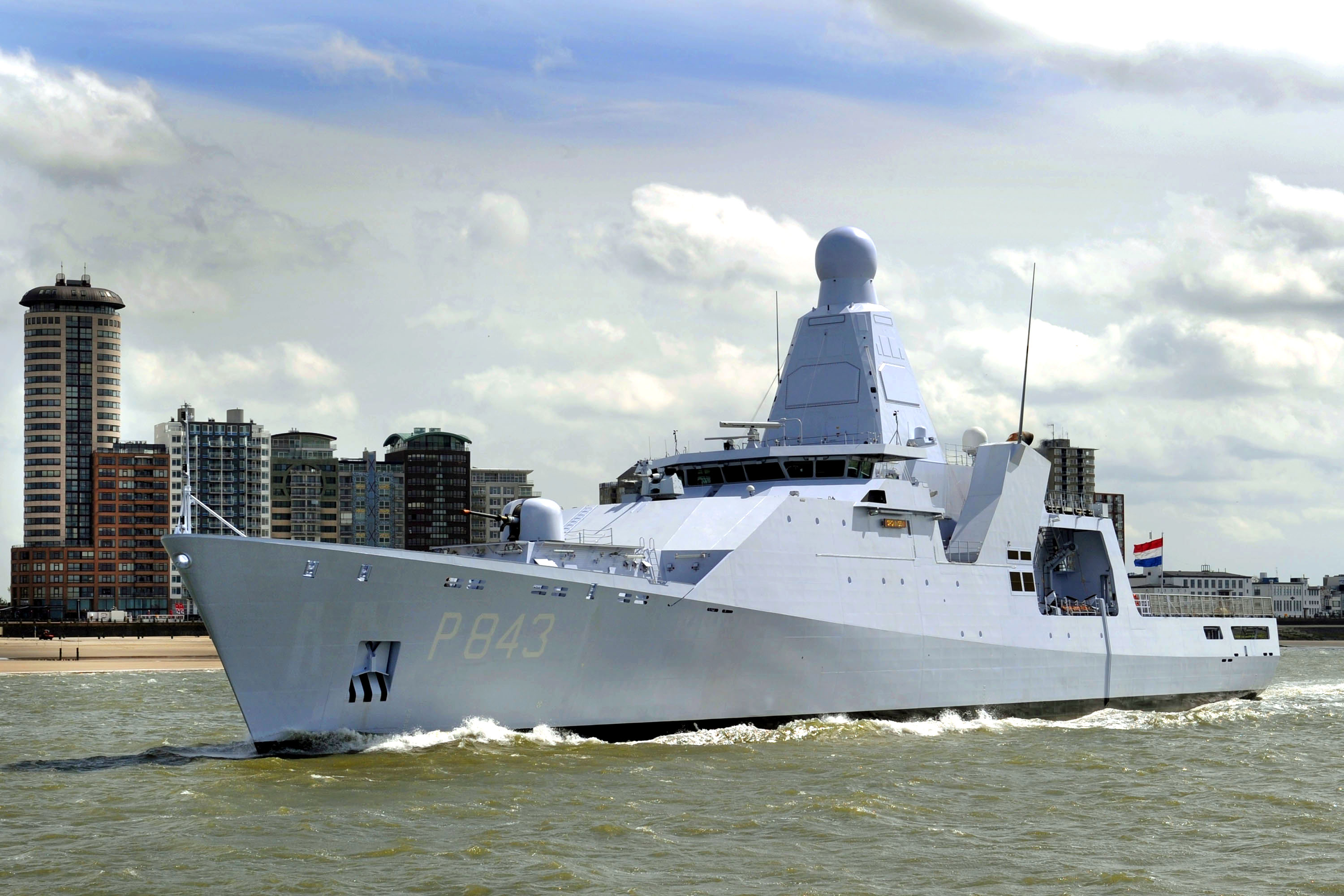
- HNLMS Groningen

History

Netherlands
- Name: Groningen
- Operator: Royal Netherlands Navy
- Builder: Damen Group
- Laid down: 9 April 2010
- Launched: 21 April 2011
- Commissioned: 29 November 2013
- Identification: MMSI number: 245846000; Callsign: PAVD
- Status: Active
- Badge

General characteristics
- Class & type: Holland-class offshore patrol vessel
- Displacement: 3,750 tons
- Length: 108.4 m (355 ft 8 in)
- Beam: 16 m (52 ft 6 in)
- Draught: 4.55 m (14 ft 11 in)
- Propulsion: RENK CODELOD; 2x MAN 12V28/33D diesel engines (5400KW each)
- Speed: 20 knots (37 km/h; 23 mph)
- Range: 5,000 nautical miles (9,300 km; 5,800 mi) at 15 knots (28 km/h; 17 mph)
- Endurance: 21 days
- Boats & landing craft carried: 1 × Fast Rescue Boat (FRB); 2 × Fast Raiding Interception and Special Forces Craft (FRISC)
- Complement: 54 (+ additional space for 40)
- Sensors & processing systems: Thales Integrated Mast; SeaMaster 400 SMILE non-rotating air warning radar; SeaWatcher 100 active phased array surface detection and tracking radar; GateKeeper Electro-optical 360° surveillance system
- Armament: Guns: 1 × 76 mm Oto Melara Super Rapid; 1 × 30 mm Oto Melara Marlin WS; 2 × 12.7 mm Oto Melara Hitrole NT; 6 × 7.62 mm FN MAG machine guns
- Aircraft carried: 1 x NH90 NFH helicopter
- Aviation facilities: fully equipped hangar and flight deck for one medium-sized helicopter

HNLMS Groningen is a Holland-class offshore patrol vessel operated by the Royal Netherlands Navy.

The vessel was built in the Romanian shipyards in Galati, by the Dutch firm Damen Group.

== Integrated mast module ==
The integrated mast module (IMM) has been built to an innovative concept. The mast houses all systems which form the "eyes and ears" of the ship. The ship can efficiently detect pirate and smuggling boats while keeping an eye on the skies as well. For the first time camera, radar and communications antenna systems are merged into one mast structure. This allows the ship to see flying and floating objects. The means of communication in the mast making it possible to carry out worldwide operations in conjunction with aircraft and ships.

== Service history ==
=== 2012 ===
In late 2012 Groningen was exercising with HNLMS Friesland when Baltic Ace sank after a collision with another ship. Both Holland-class offshore patrol vessels assisted in the search for survivors.

=== 2014 ===
On 28 April, Groningen departed Den Helder for deployment to the Caribbean on counter-drug operations and coast guard duties. On her way to the Caribbean she completed multiple exercises with six other European navies (MAOC-N).

In early June Groningen received an overnight notification from the US Coast Guard. A patrol plane saw a boat, a so-called go-fast, heading north at high speed. A US helicopter on board the ship took off immediately. Groningen itself headed to the specified location off the coast of Panama. When the smugglers heard the helicopter, they jettisoned their cargo. Groningen arrived moments later. The crew managed to retrieve multiple packages of drugs from the water. They recovered about half of the estimated 300 kilograms (660 lb).

The three smugglers were arrested and transferred to the Coast Guard. She returned home to Vlissingen on 5 September for a short maintenance period.

On 29 December two Russian navy vessels, the destroyer Vice-Admiral Kulakov and a tug from the Sliva-class sailed along the Dutch coast being escorted by Groningen.

=== 2015 ===
On 9 August Groningen departed Den Helder for a four-month deployment off the coast of Somalia, as part of the EU anti-piracy mission Atalanta. On 11 December she sailed back into her homeport.

=== 2016 ===
In 2016 Groningen was deployed to the Caribbean on counter-drug operations and coast guard duties.

=== 2018 ===
In December 2018, the Royal Netherlands Navy (RNLN) was reported to be planning to trial a new crewing concept for its Holland-class offshore patrol vessels (OPVs) and selected Groningen for this two-year long pilot project. The main purpose of the project is to provide clarity for crews to know when they are deployed and when they are back home.

=== 2020 ===
On 19 July, the ship's NH90 NFH helicopter crashed off the coast of Aruba, killing two crew members and injuring two passengers. The Dutch Ministry of Defence launched an investigation, grounding all of the country's NH90s until more is known.

=== 2023 ===
In 2023 HNLMS Groningen was fitted with a Hull Vane, which led to a 16% fuel reduction at 17.5 knots and 10% across the full usage profile.

=== 2026 ===
In 2026 HNLMS Groningen was deployed from Curaçao to Venezuela to provide relief after the double earthquake that Venezuela experienced on 24 June 2026.

According to the Dutch Ministry of Defence, the naval ship was loaded with food, water, and relief supplies, among other things, and was equipped with a water purification system that could also be used.

== See also ==
- HNLMS Holland (P840)
- HNLMS Zeeland (P841)
- HNLMS Friesland (P842)
