= West Friesland =

West Friesland or Westfriesland can refer to the following:

- West Friesland (region), a contemporary region in the province of North Holland, Netherlands
- The same region as the State of West Friesland in the Dutch Republic
- Occasionally, the region where the West Frisian language is spoken, i.e., mostly the province of Friesland in the Netherlands
- West Frisia, the western part of the historical region of Frisia
- Westfriesland, a Dutch ship of the line of 78/80 guns of the Admiralty of the Noorderkwartier, built in c. 1666
- Westfriesland, a Dutch ship of the line of 90 guns of the Admiralty of the Noorderkwartier, built in 1682
