= HNLMS Zeeland (P841) =

Offshore patrol vessel

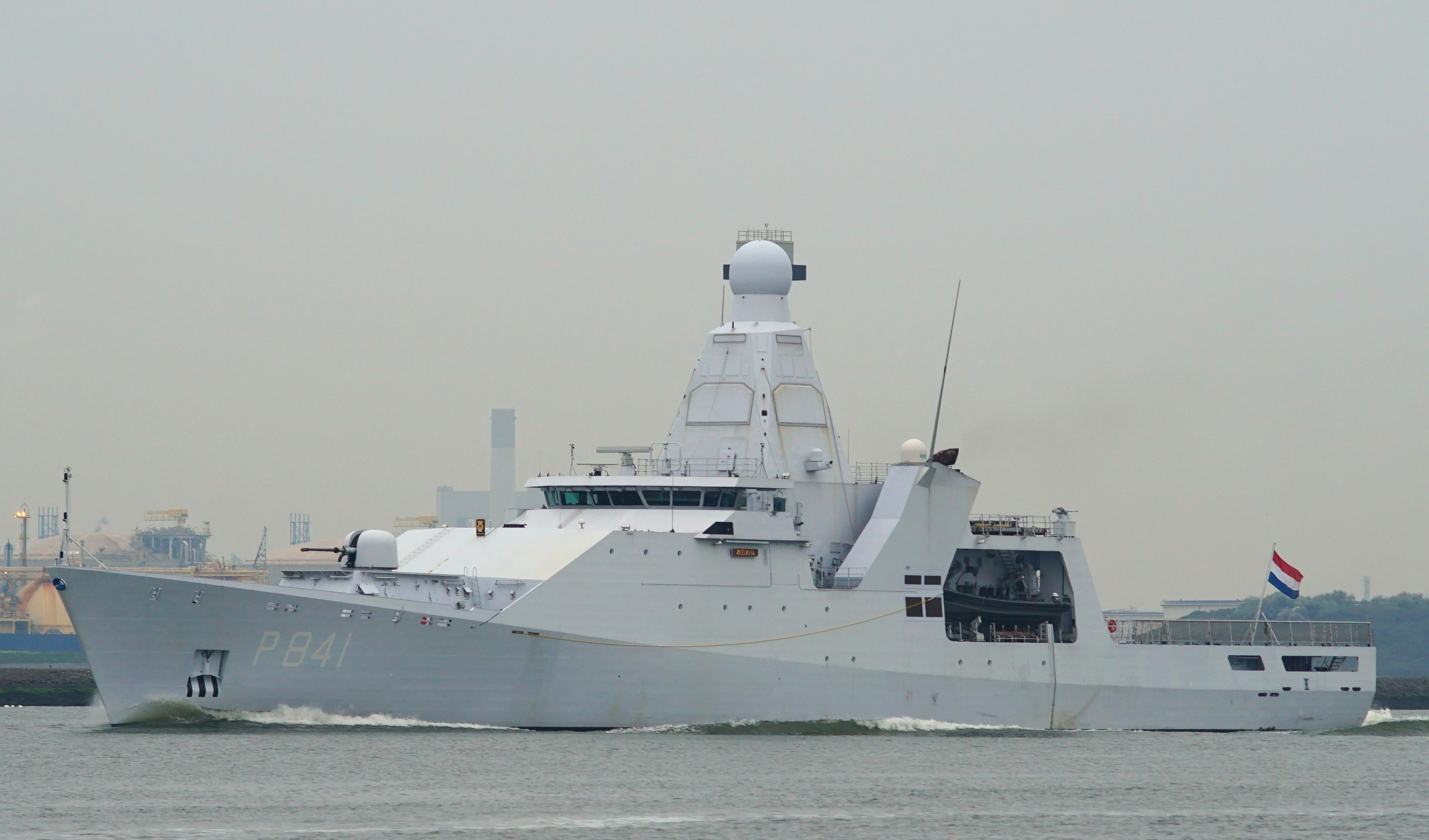
- HNLMS Zeeland in Rotterdam at the 2014 World Port Days

History

Netherlands
- Name: Zeeland
- Namesake: Zeeland
- Builder: Damen Group
- Laid down: 8 December 2008
- Launched: 2 February 2010
- Commissioned: 23 August 2013
- Status: Inactive. Awaiting repairs due to a large fire
- Badge

General characteristics
- Class & type: Holland-class offshore patrol vessel
- Displacement: approx. 3,750 tonnes (3,690 long tons; 4,130 short tons) full load
- Length: 108.4 m (355 ft 8 in)
- Beam: 16 m (52 ft 6 in)
- Draught: 4.55 m (14 ft 11 in)
- Propulsion: RENK CODELOD; 2x MAN 12V28/33D diesel engines (5460KW each)
- Speed: 21.5 knots (39.8 km/h; 24.7 mph)
- Range: 5,000 nautical miles (9,300 km; 5,800 mi) at 15 knots (28 km/h; 17 mph)
- Endurance: 21 days
- Boats & landing craft carried: 1 × Fast Rescue Boat (FRB); 2 × Fast Raiding Interception and Special Forces Craft (FRISC)
- Complement: 54 (+ additional space for 40)
- Sensors & processing systems: Thales Integrated Mast; SeaMaster 400 SMILE non-rotating air warning radar; SeaWatcher 100 active phased array surface detection and tracking radar; GateKeeper Electro-optical 360° surveillance system
- Armament: Guns: 1 × 76 mm (3.0 in) Oto Melara Super Rapid; 1 × 30 mm (1.2 in) Oto Melara Marlin WS; 2 × 12.7 mm (0.50 in) Oto Melara Hitrole NT; 6 × 7.62 mm (0.300 in) FN MAG machine guns
- Aircraft carried: 1 x NH90 NFH helicopter
- Aviation facilities: fully equipped hangar and flight deck for one medium-sized helicopter

HNLMS Zeeland is the second ship of the Holland-class offshore patrol vessels of the Royal Netherlands Navy. The ship entered service on 29 November 2013 and is named after the Dutch province of Zeeland.

== Design ==
The ship was originally designed to fulfill patrol and intervention tasks against lightly armed opponents, such as pirates and smugglers. However, she also has very advanced electronic and radar surveillance capabilities which are used for military stabilisation and security roles, short of outright war. Without sonar or long range weapons, it utilizes the surveillance capabilities of the Thales integrated mast, which integrates communication systems and two 4-faced phased arrays for air and surface search.

It was planned that Zeeland would be the first ship of the Royal Netherlands Navy to be equipped with a Hull Vane. However, later it was decided that the Groningen would be the first ship to be equipped with a Hull Vane.

=== Integrated mast module ===
The integrated mast module (IMM) has been built to an innovative concept. The mast houses all systems which form the "eyes and ears" of the ship. The ship can efficiently detect pirate and smuggling boats while keeping an eye on the skies as well. For the first time camera, radar and communications antenna systems are merged into one mast structure. This allows the ship to see flying and floating objects. The means of communication in the mast making it possible to carry out worldwide operations in conjunction with aircraft and ships.

== Service history ==
On 6 February 2014, Zeeland rescued seven of the eleven passengers of an overturned boat while it was on its way to the Dutch Caribbean to fulfill patrol duties. Three of the eleven passengers died before Zeeland spotted the boat, one of the passengers was missing.

On 21 January 2015 Zeeland left for the Dutch Caribbean to perform coast guard and law enforcement duties.

Zeeland and Pelikaan had an important role in the emergency assistance to Sint Maarten, St Eustatius and Saba after hurricane Irma had hit the island in September 2017.

=== Fire ===
Around 01:30 on the night of 4 July 2022 a fire broke out in an electrical room while undergoing maintenance in drydock at de Nieuwe Haven Naval Base. The fire was extinguished after burning for one and a half hours. No one was injured. An investigation into the cause and damage will be carried out in the near future. The ship suffered significant damage.

== See also ==
- HNLMS Holland (P840)
- HNLMS Friesland (P842)
- HNLMS Groningen (P843)
