= HNLMS Friesland (P842) =

Offshore patrol vessel

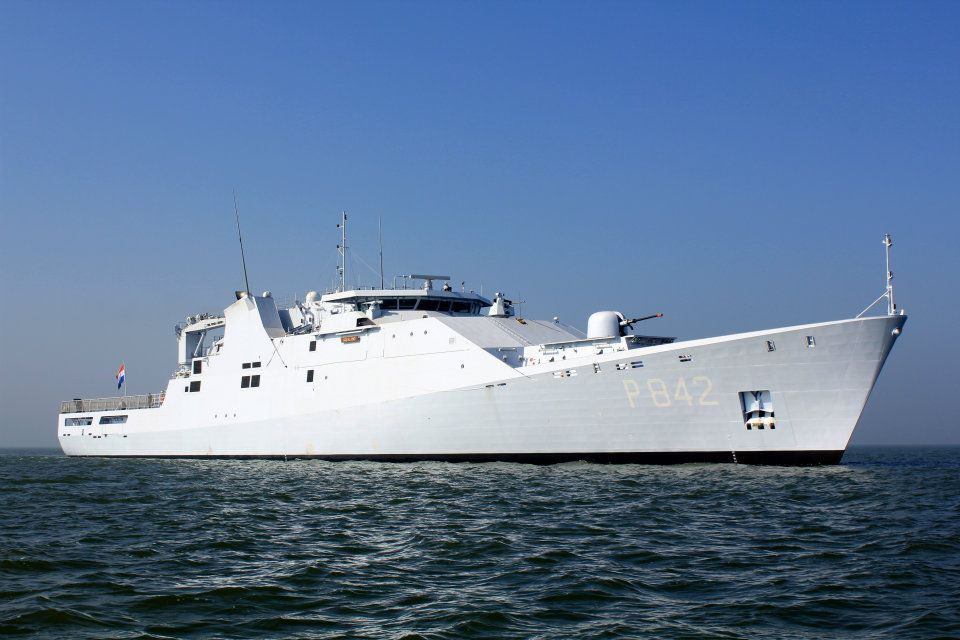
- HNLMS Friesland without I-Mast 400 (Min. of Defence)

History

Netherlands
- Name: Friesland
- Namesake: Friesland
- Builder: Damen Group
- Laid down: 26 November 2009
- Launched: 4 November 2010
- Commissioned: 22 January 2013
- Identification: MMSI number: 245838000; Callsign: PAVC
- Status: Active
- Badge

General characteristics
- Class & type: Holland-class offshore patrol vessel
- Displacement: approx. 3,750 tons full load
- Length: 108.4 m (355 ft 8 in)
- Beam: 16 m (52 ft 6 in)
- Draught: 4.55 m (14 ft 11 in)
- Propulsion: RENK CODELOD; 2x MAN 12V28/33D diesel engines (5460KW each)
- Speed: 21.5 knots (39.8 km/h; 24.7 mph)
- Range: 5,000 nautical miles (9,300 km; 5,800 mi) at 15 knots (28 km/h; 17 mph)
- Endurance: 21 days
- Boats & landing craft carried: 1 × Fast Rescue Boat (FRB); 2 × Fast Raiding Interception and Special Forces Craft (FRISC)
- Complement: 54 (+ additional space for 40)
- Sensors & processing systems: Thales Integrated Mast; SeaMaster 400 SMILE non-rotating air warning radar; SeaWatcher 100 active phased array surface detection and tracking radar; GateKeeper Electro-optical 360° surveillance system
- Armament: Guns: 1 × 76 mm Oto Melara Super Rapid; 1 × 30 mm Oto Melara Marlin WS; 2 × 12.7 mm Oto Melara Hitrole NT; 6 × 7.62 mm FN MAG machine guns
- Aircraft carried: 1 x NH90 NFH helicopter
- Aviation facilities: fully equipped hangar and flight deck for one medium-sized helicopter

HNLMS Friesland is a Holland-class offshore patrol vessel operated by the Royal Netherlands Navy. The ship entered service on 22 January 2013 and is named after the Dutch province of Friesland.

== History ==
The vessel was built in the Romanian shipyards, in Galati, by the Dutch firm Damen Group. The keel laying took place on 26 November 2009 and the launching on 4 November 2010. The ship was put into service on 22 January 2013.

On 26 April 2012, Friesland assisted in the rescue of a sail training vessel off Iona while participating in an international exercise.

In November 2015 Friesland, and elements of the United States Coast Guard, cooperated in the seizure of $17 million of cocaine. The operation was part of Operation Caribbean Venture, under the overall command of the Royal Netherlands Navy. In March 2016, the ship shadowed the Russian destroyer Vice-Admiral Kulakov as the destroyer neared Dutch waters.

On 20 September 2018 Friesland intercepted a go-fast with its NH90 NFH. The cargohold of the go-fast contained 900 kg of cocaine. The passengers of the boat were delivered to the United States Coast Guard. That same year Friesland also visited Havana.

In September 2023 it was reported that Friesland had become the first vessel to utilize the high-capacity shore power supply at Damen Shiprepair Vlissingen, after docking at the yard for maintenance.

In January 2025 Friesland shadowed the Russian Kilo-class submarine Novorossiysk and the Russian corvette Boikiy while they were passing through the Dutch exclusive economic zone of the North Sea.

== See also ==
- HNLMS Holland (P840)
- HNLMS Zeeland (P841)
- HNLMS Groningen (P843)
