= Hitrole =

Italian remote weapon station

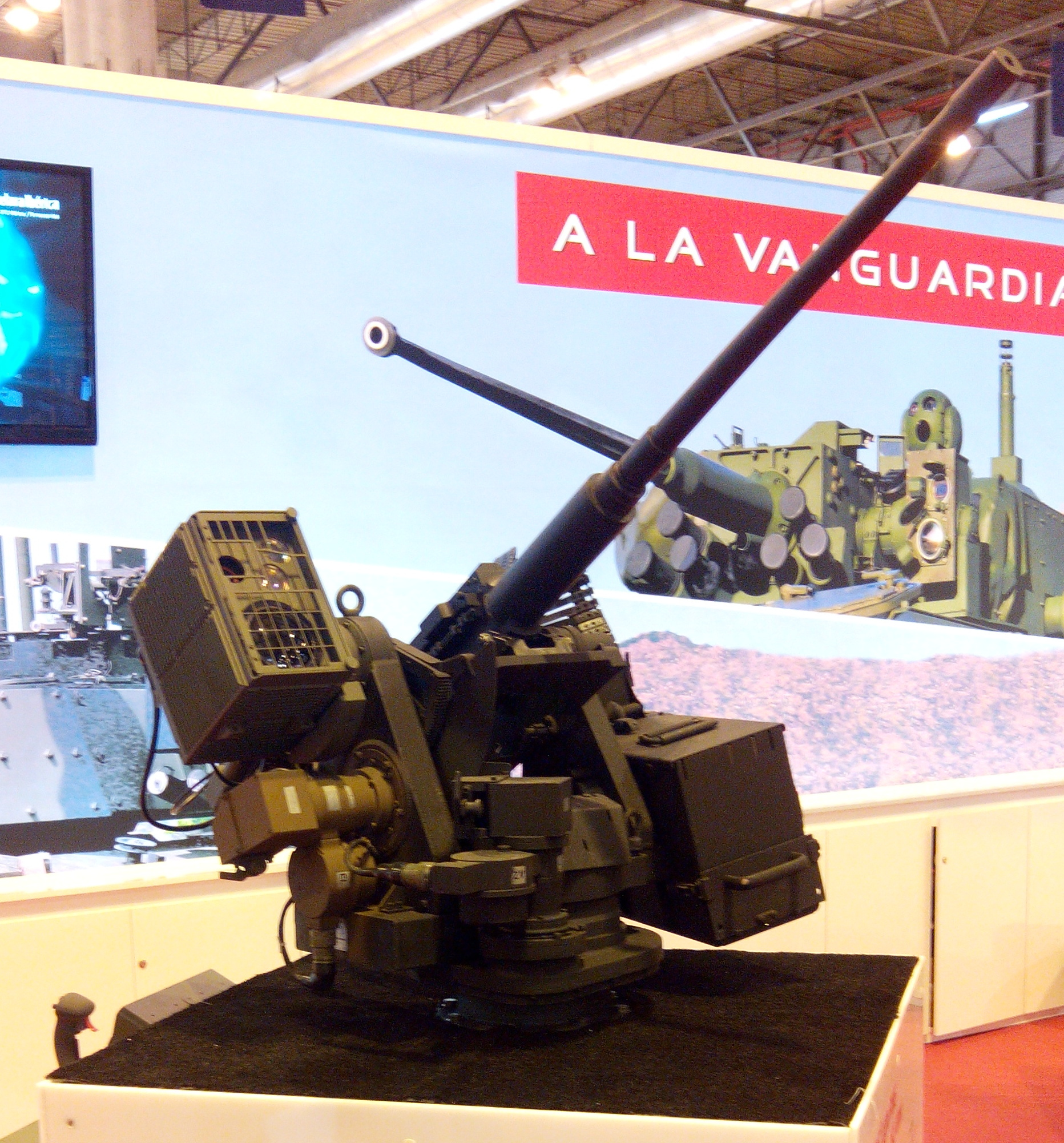

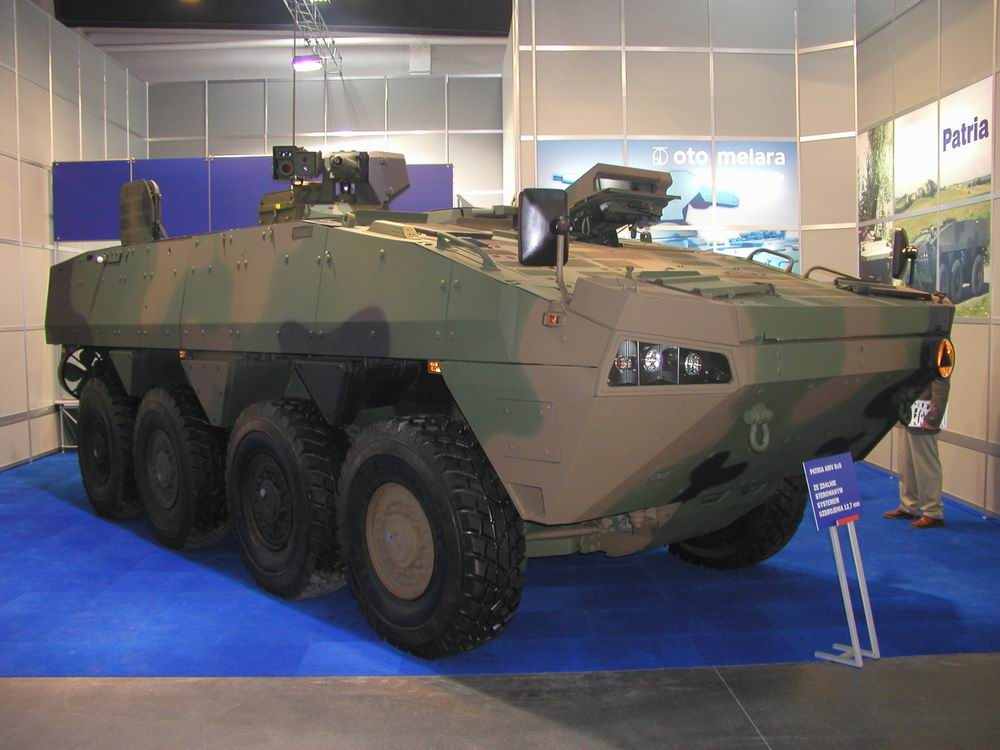
Hitrole 12.7 mm on a Rosomak 8×8

The Hitrole is a remote weapons station manufactured by Italian arms company Oto Melara (merged into Leonardo S.p.A., previously Finmeccanica since 2016). The "role" portion of the name is short for "Remotely Operated, Light Electrical".

The turret can mount a variety of lighter automatic weapons, including 5.56 mm (0.219 in), 7.62 mm (0.300 in), and 12.7 mm (0.50 in) machine guns, and 40 mm (1.6 in) automatic grenade launchers.

Leonardo recently presented the new line of Lionfish remote-controlled small-caliber systems, which consists of four models: the Ultralight, the Inner Reloading and the Top with a 12.7 mm caliber, and the 20 model with a 20 mm caliber.

The weapon is gyroscopically stabilized. The turret weighs 210–260 kilograms (460–570 lb), depending on the weapon fitted. The gunner's remote optics add an infrared camera and laser range finder to a regular visible light camera.

The gunner is assisted with a fire control computer. The fire control computer can help the gunner track moving targets.

In 2009 the Italian Army ordered 81 turrets to equip its Iveco Lince vehicles in Afghanistan.

According to Jane's Navy International the Singapore Navy ordered Hitrole turrets in August 2013. A total of 16 turrets were ordered for Singapore's eight Littoral Mission Vessels.

== Versions ==
- Hitrole-N
- Hitrole-L
- Hitrole-NT (since 2008)
- Hitrole-G (since 2012)
- Hitrole-20 (since 2014)

== Operators ==
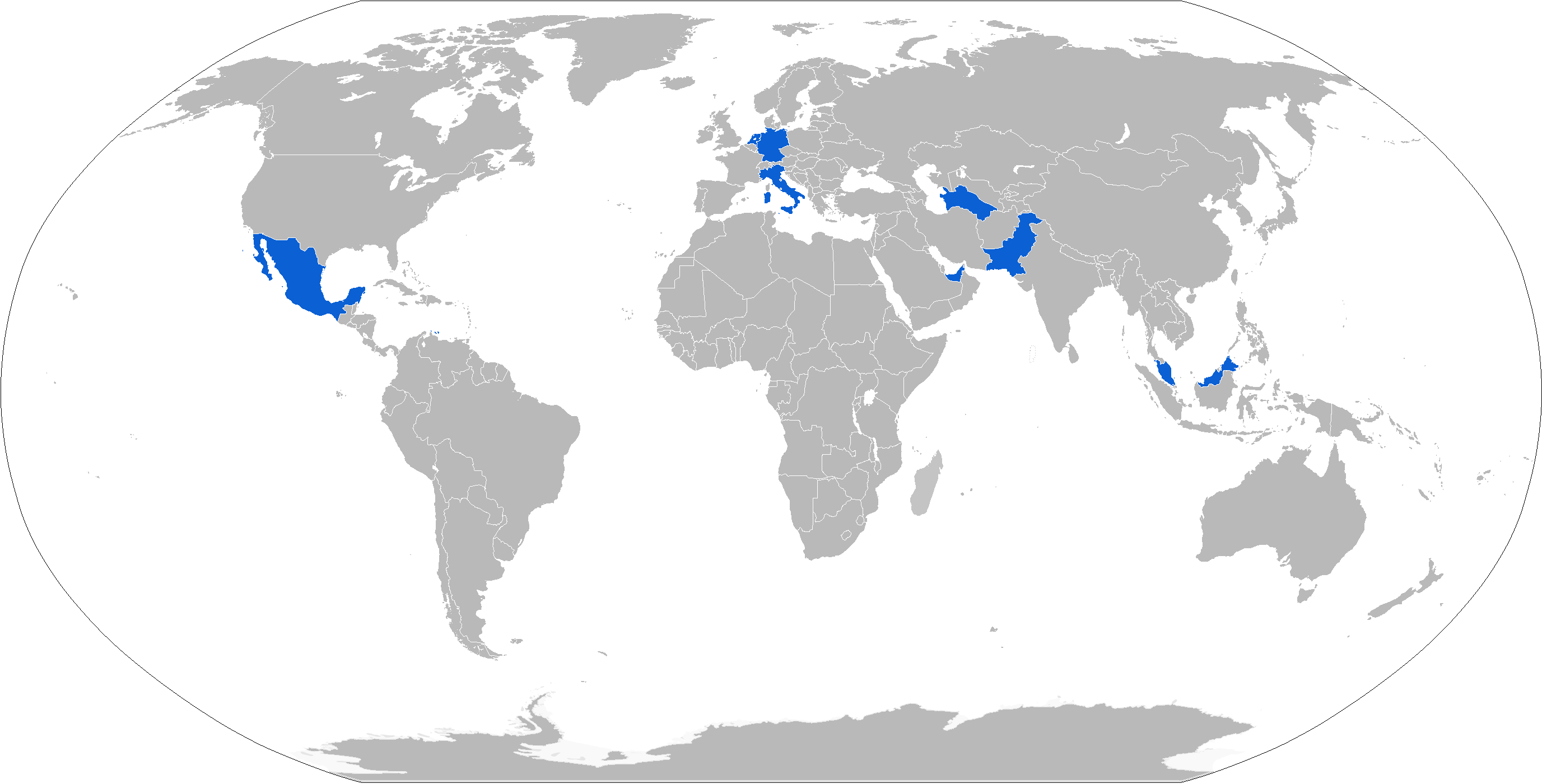
Map with Hitrole operators in blue

Platforms using the Oto-Melara Hitrole include:

=== Current operators ===
United Arab Emirates

- Falaj 2 class United Arab Emirates Navy patrol boats (4 Hitrole-G)
- Ghannatha class United Arab Emirates Navy patrol boats (24 Hitrole-G)

Germany

- F-125 class Germany Navy fregate (21 Hitrole-NT)

Italy

- Corrubia Guardia di Finanza patrol boat (13 Hitrole-N)
- Puma (AFV) Italian Army Armoured fighting vehicle (19 Hitrole)
- Iveco VTLM Lince Italian Army (100 Hitrole-L)
- Iveco VTMM Orso Italian Army (40 Hitrole-L)

Malaysia

- MRTP 16 class Malaysian Coast Guard patrol boat (18 x Hitrole-N)

Mexico

- Oaxaca-class Mexican Navy OPV (8 Hitrole-N)
- (12 Hitrole-N)

Netherlands

- Holland class Royal Netherlands Navy OPV (2x Hitrole-NT each)
- HNLMS Karel Doorman joint support ship Royal Netherlands Navy (4x Hitrole-NT)

Pakistan

- (2 Hitrole-N)

Singapore

- Littoral Mission Vessels Singapore Navy patrol boat (16 Hitrole-G)
- naval base land defence (10 Hitrole-G)

Turkmenistan

- (Hitrole-N)
