= Border and Immigration Agency =

Former executive agency in the UK

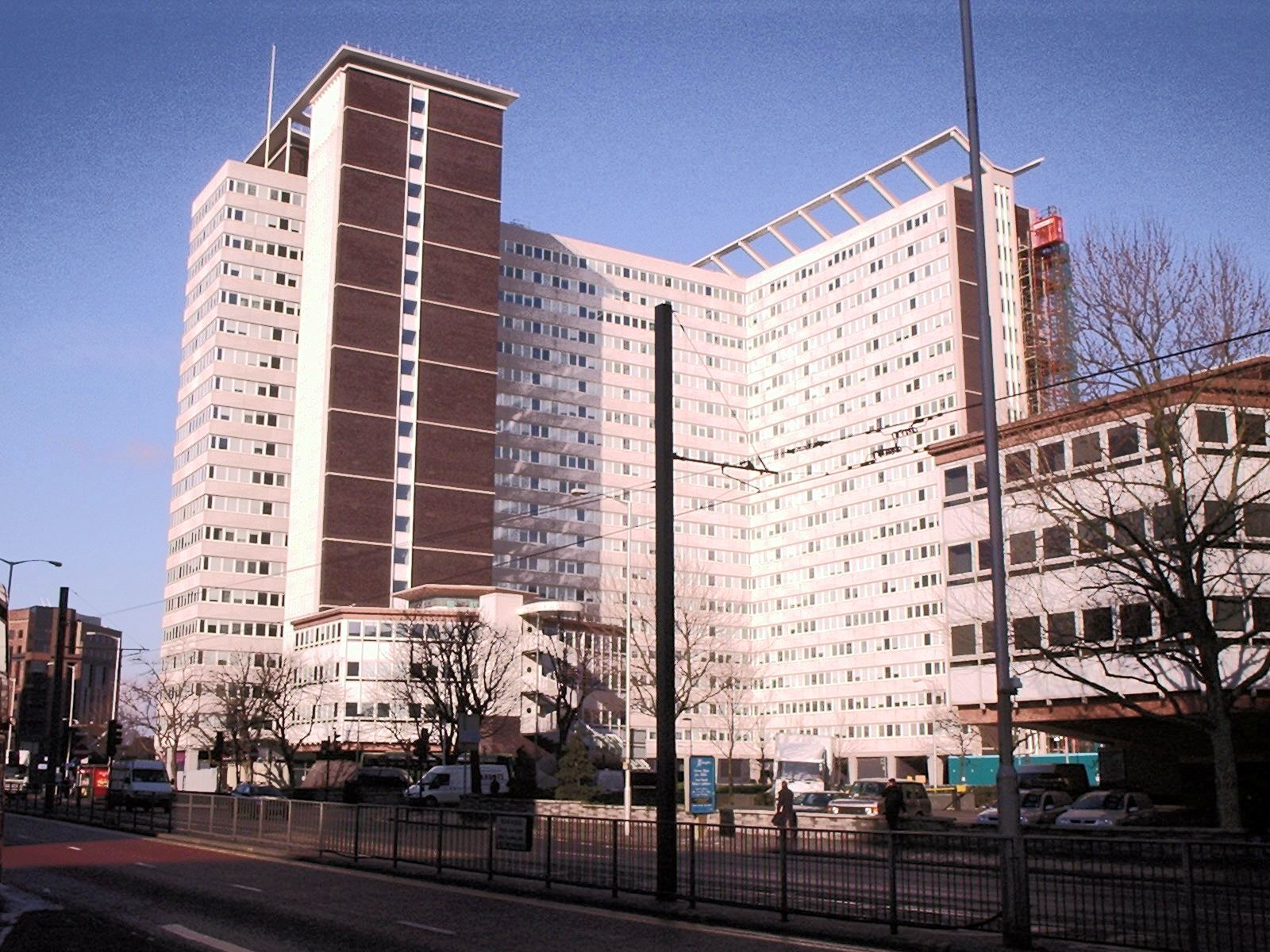
Lunar House which housed the headquarters of the Home Office Border and Immigration Agency

The Border and Immigration Agency (BIA) was an executive agency of the British Home Office, created on 1 April 2007 and replaced on 1 April 2008. The agency replaced the Immigration and Nationality Directorate, assuming its responsibilities for managing immigration control in the United Kingdom. The BIA also considered applications for visas to enter the UK, permission to remain, citizenship, asylum and in-country enforcement of immigration law. The headquarters were located in Croydon.

The BIA was responsible for delivering the e-border programme, a modernised border control system proposed by the UK Government, and a new programme of biometrically controlled identity documents for foreign nationals.

On 1 April 2008, the BIA merged with UKVisas and the port of entry functions of HM Revenue and Customs to form the UK Border Agency. Then, in 2012 and 2013, the UK Border Agency was split into three new organisations: Border Force, responsible for front-line border control, UK Visas and Immigration, responsible for the UK visa system, and Immigration Enforcement, responsible for enforcing immigration law.

== See also ==
- UK Visas and Immigration
