= Manzie =

Manzie is a surname. Notable people with the surname include:

- Andrew Manzie (1863–1943), Australian rules football club administrator
- Daryl Manzie (born 1946), Australian politician
- Gordon Manzie (1930–2014), British civil servant
- Jimmy Manzie, Australian musician
- John Manzie (born 1947), Australian rules footballer
- Stella Manzie (born 1960), British civil servant
