= NBTC =

NBTC may refer to:

- National Basketball Training Center, Philippines
- National Border Targeting Centre, a government immigration centre in the United Kingdom
- National Broadcasting and Telecommunications Commission, a Thai regulatory agency
- National Building Trades Council, an American federation of labor unions
- New Brunswick Teachers' College, Canada
- Newport Beach Tennis Club, a tennis club in California, US
