= Rajiv Dabhadkar =

Indian author and columnist

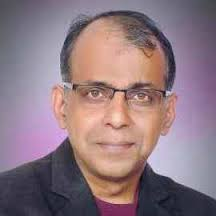
Rajiv Dabhadkar

Dabhadkar Rajiv is an Indian technocrat, author, columnist and CEO & Founder of "National Organization for Software and Technology Professionals".

== Activism ==
The initial goal of Dabhadkar was to alter the public's perception of Indian knowledge workers employed abroad, particularly in the US. His commissioned media initiatives have primarily focused on communicating the issues of wage discrimination and abuse of the rights of guest workers.

His research work has been cited by the UK Border Agency as well as the US Homeland Security.

Rajiv Dabhadkar returned to India, after staying more than a decade in the United States of America, and founded The National Organization for Software and Technology Professionals (NOSTOPS) in April 2004. He joined hands with Bright Future Jobs as an American lobbying partner to end the xenophobic anti-guest worker sentiments.

Dabhadkar is also a columnist on few notable websites such as The Times of India, Moneycontrol and Medium.

== Bibliography ==
- Green Carrot – Americas Work Visa Crisis, 2014, p:204, ISBN 978-1-5009-2910-7
- "Americanisms – The Guide for Indian BPO Industry", 2005, p:157
- American Work Permit - Official Rules and Regulations of the American Work Visa, 2004
