= Autoclaved aerated concrete =

Lightweight, precast building material

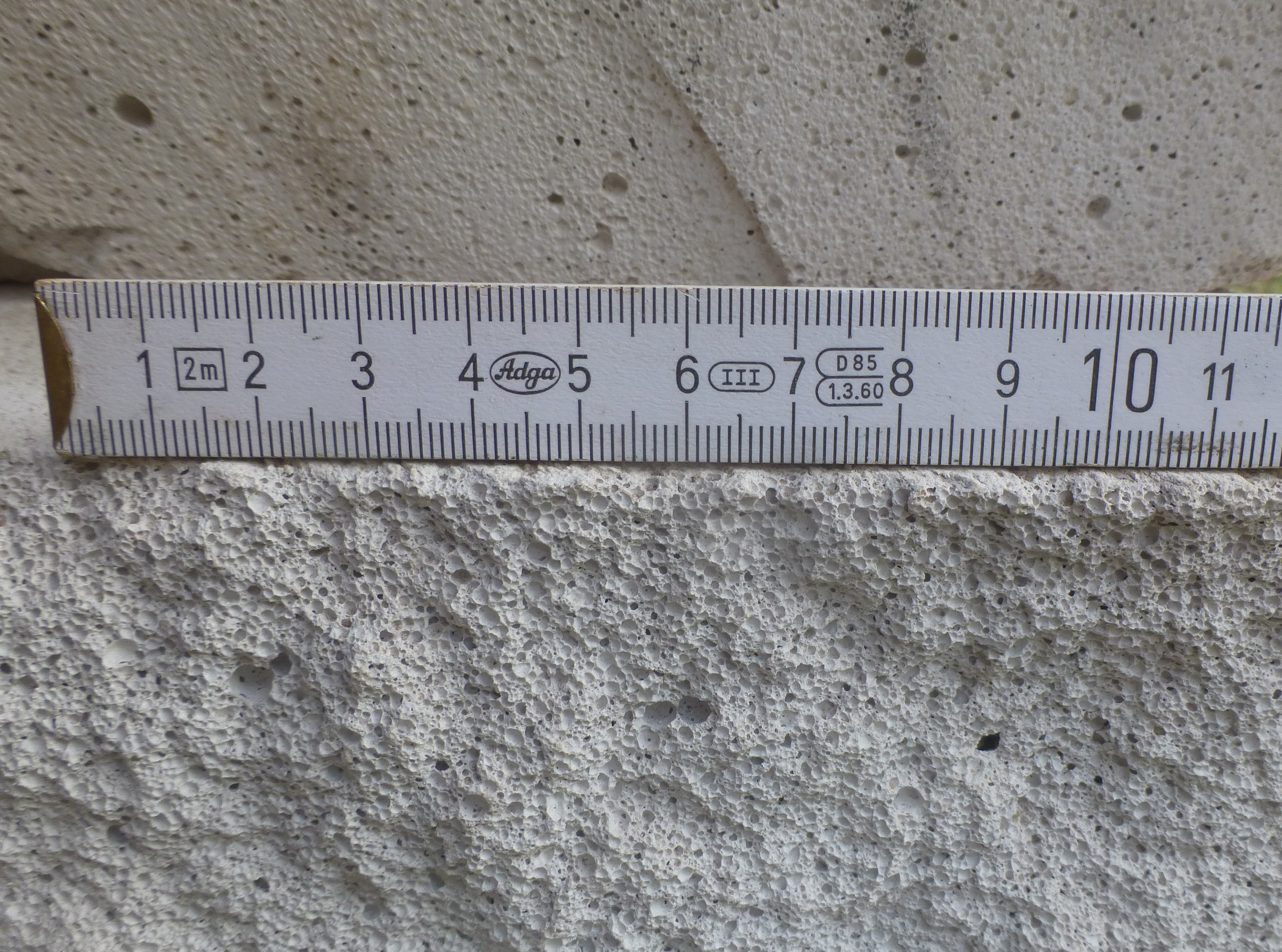
Sectional view of AAC.

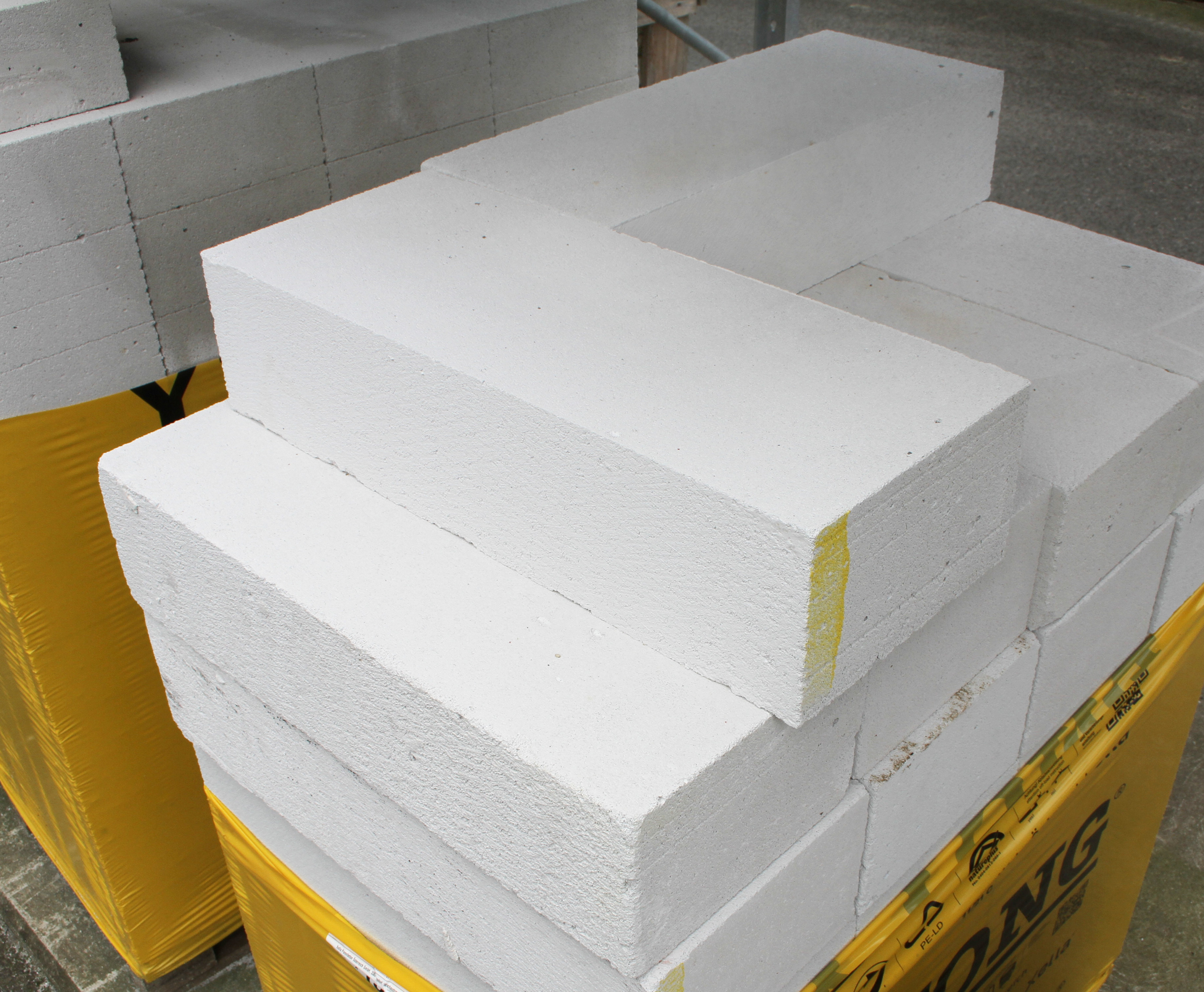
Pallet stacked AAC blocks.

Autoclaved aerated concrete (AAC), also known as autoclaved cellular concrete or autoclaved concrete, is a lightweight, precast building material that is used as an alternative to traditional concrete blocks and clay bricks. It was developed in the mid-1920s by Johan Axel Eriksson. Unlike cellular concrete, which is typically mixed and poured on-site, AAC products are manufactured in a factory under controlled conditions.

The composition of AAC includes a mixture of quartz sand, gypsum, lime, Portland cement, water, fly ash and aluminium powder. Following partial curing in a mould, the AAC mixture undergoes additional curing under heat and pressure in an autoclave. AAC is used in various forms including blocks, wall panels and lintels.

Shaping and cutting AAC can be done with a handsaw. When used externally, AAC products need a protective finish to prevent water absorption and damage.

== History ==
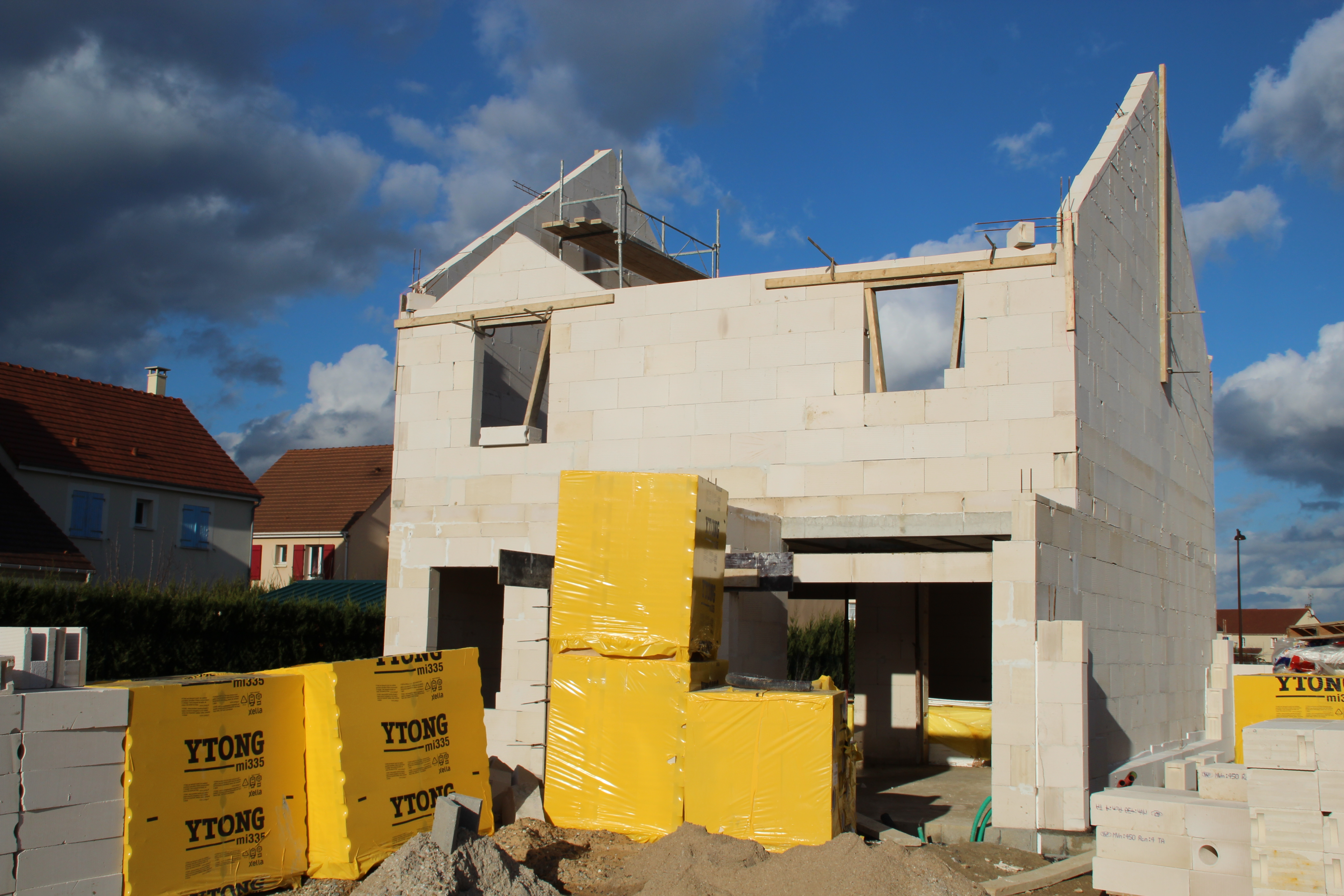
House construction site using AAC blocks in Ablis, France.

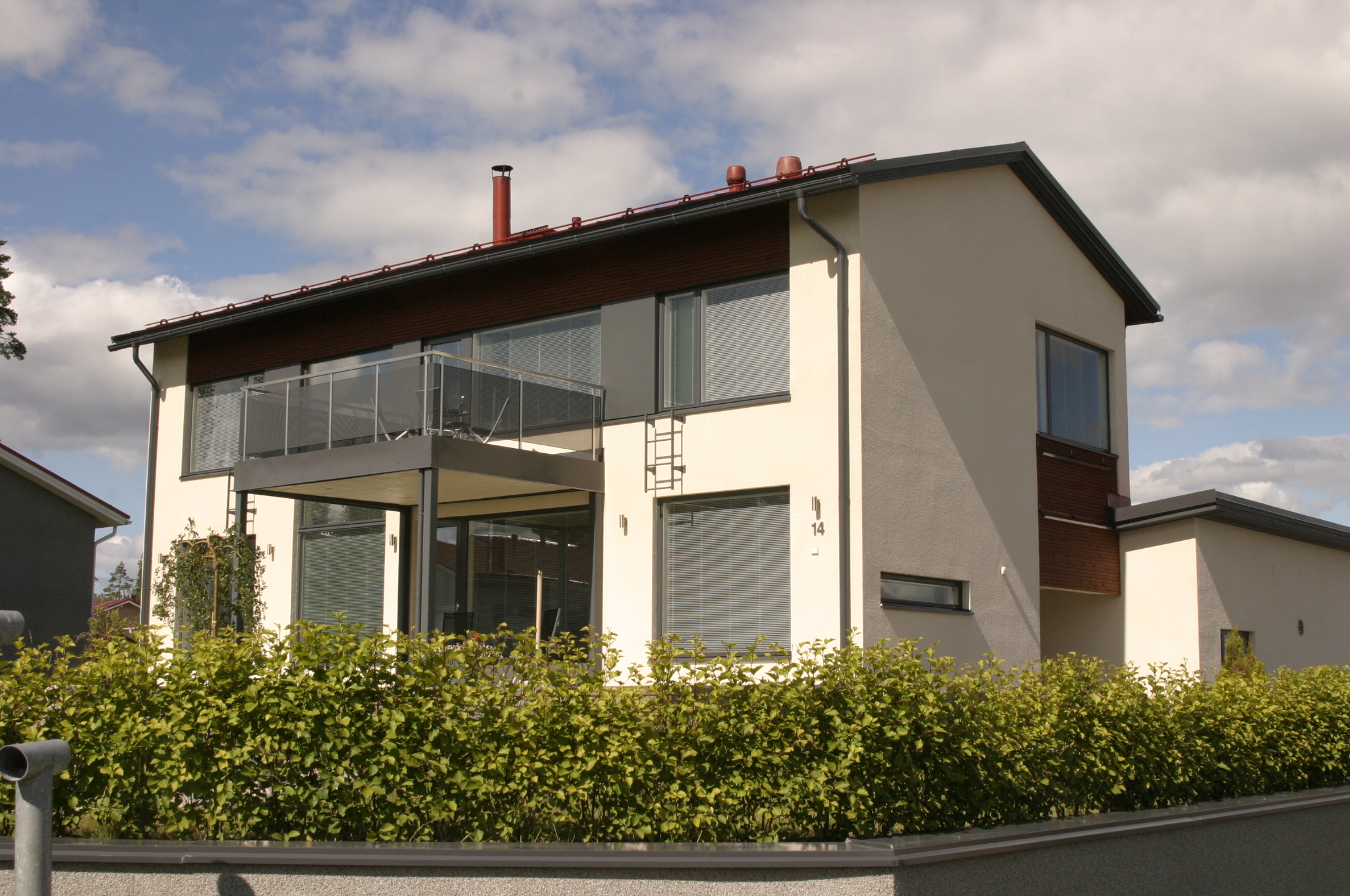
Residential house constructed of AAC blocks in Kuopio, Finland.

AAC was first created in the mid-1920s by the Swedish architect and inventor Johan Axel Eriksson (1888–1961), along with Henrik Kreüger at the Royal Institute of Technology. The process was patented in 1924. In 1929, production started in Sweden in the city of Yxhult as "Yxhults Ånghärdade Gasbetong" which roughly translates to "steam hardened concrete from Yxhult", and later became the world's first registered building material brand Ytong. Another brand, Siporex, was established in Sweden in 1939. This was followed by the establishment of another cellular concrete brand, Hebel, which opened their first plant in Memmingen, Germany, in 1943.

Ytong AAC was originally produced in Sweden using alum shale, which contained combustible carbon beneficial to the production process. However, these deposits were found to contain natural uranium, which presented a hazard as it underwent radioactive decay over time that accumulated as radon gas. In 1972 this problem was raised by the Swedish Radiation Safety Authority, and by 1975 Ytong had started using a new formulation that did not use alum shale.

In 1978, Siporex Sweden opened a factory in Saudi Arabia, establishing the Lightweight Construction Company (LCC), supplying Gulf Cooperation Council countries with aerated blocks and panels. Since 1980, there has been a worldwide increase in the use of AAC materials. The use of AAC has expanded globally, particularly in regions experiencing rapid urban development.

AAC Blocks were introduced in India in the early 1990s. One of the first manufacturers in the country was Biltech Building Elements Limited, which began AAC production in 1993 at its Palwal, Haryana facility. In 2017, Biltech acquired the AAC manufacturing units of Siporex India.

Today, the manufacturing of autoclaved aerated concrete (AAC) is centred in Europe and Asia, with some limited production facilities in the Americas, and at least one plant in Egypt. While growth in the European market has slowed, AAC production in parts of Asia has expanded, particularly in response to urban development demands. As of 2025, China remains the world's largest autoclaved aerated concrete market, hosting over 2,000 manufacturing plants and producing approximately 190 million cubic meters of AAC annually.

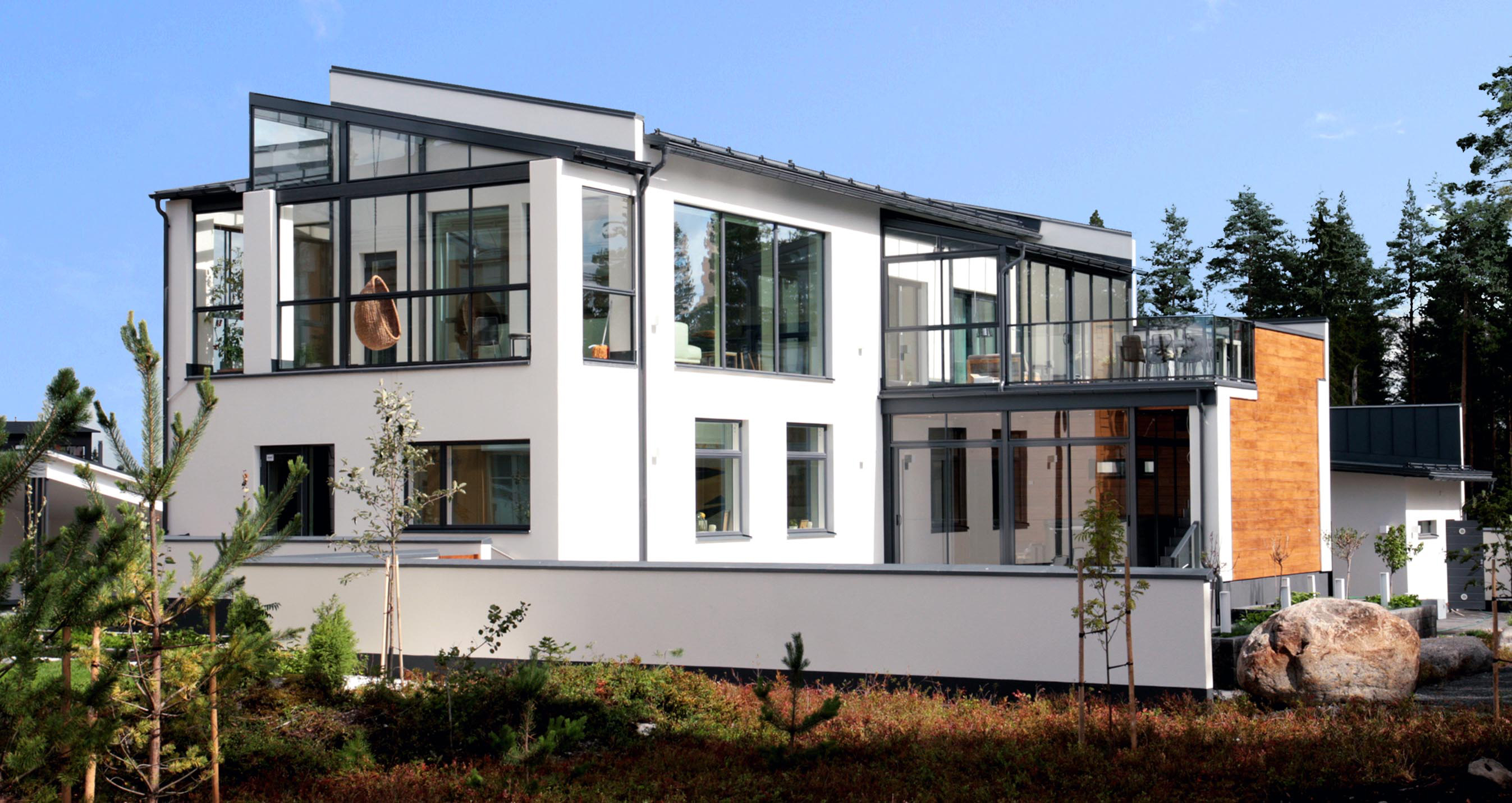
Residential house constructed at the Finnish Seinäjoki Housing Fair in 2016 using AAC blocks.

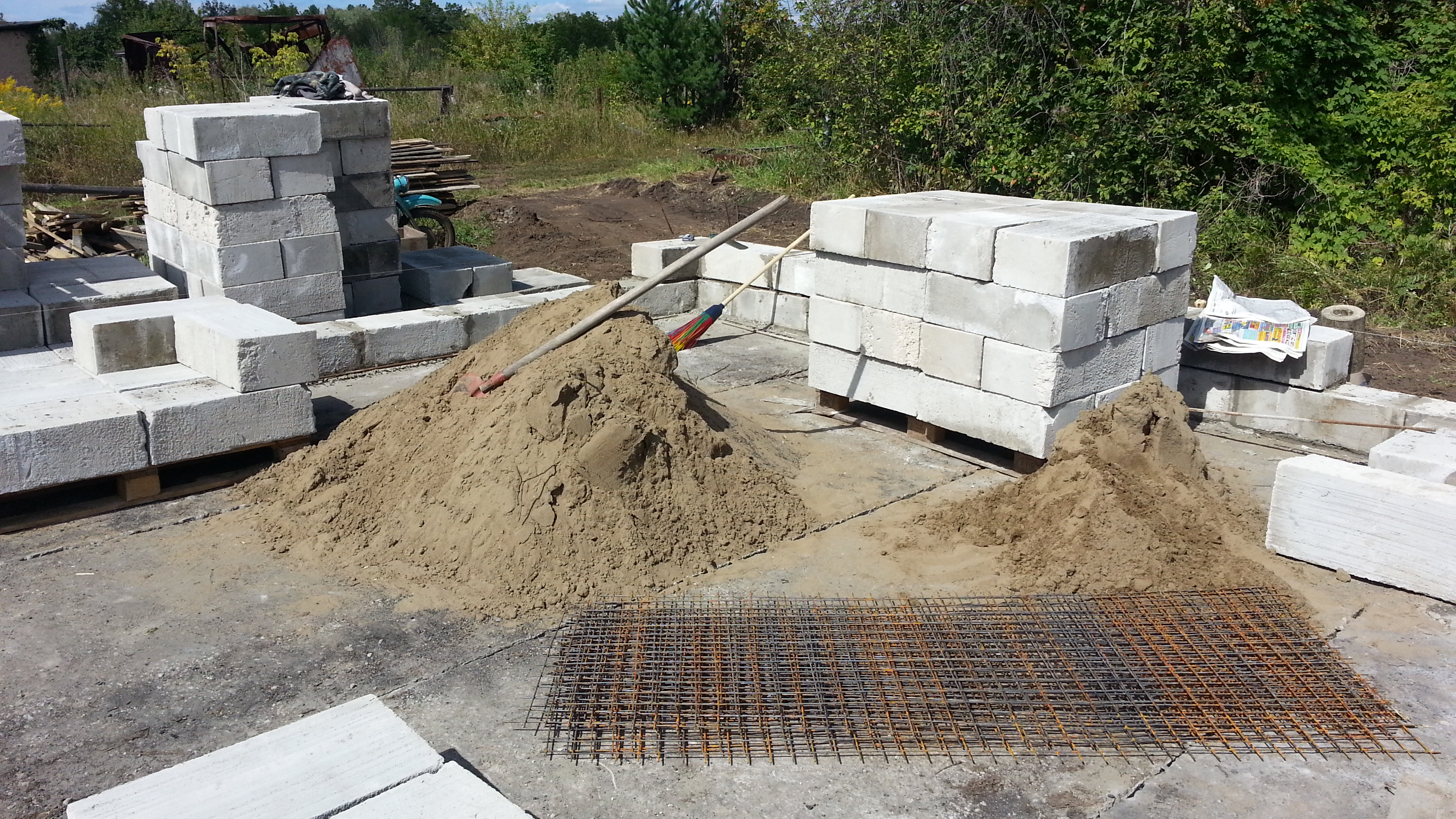
AAC blocks on a residential house construction site in Russia.

== Uses ==
AAC is used for both exterior and interior construction. It is used in high-rise construction projects and areas with frequent temperature fluctuation. Due to its lower density, AAC can reduce a building's structural load, potentially decreasing the amount of steel reinforcement and conventional concrete needed. Similarly, less material is required for rendering because AAC can be shaped before installation. Although regular cement mortar is compatible with AAC, many buildings employing its components utilize thin bed mortar, typically around 3.2 millimetres (1/8 in) thick, in accordance with specific national building codes.

== Manufacturing ==
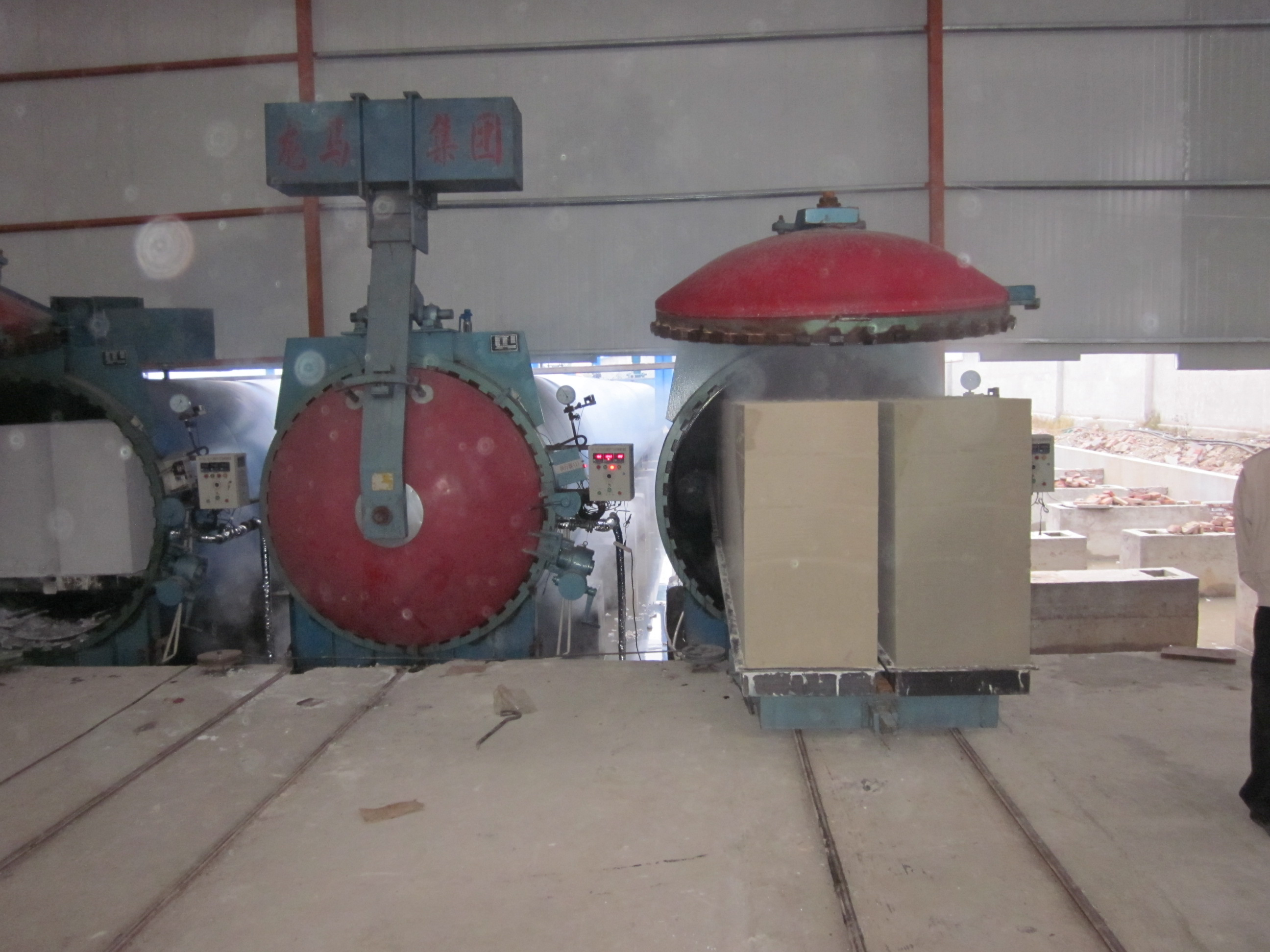
Uncured AAC blocks (on the right) ready to be fed into an autoclave to be rapidly cured into a finished product under heat and pressure; AAC production site in China.

The aggregate used in AAC typically consists of finely ground sand or fly ash, depending on regional availability. Binding agents include quartz sand, lime, calcined gypsum, cement, and water. Aluminium powder constitutes 0.05–0.08% by volume. Some countries (such as India and China) use fly ash from coal-fired power plants (50–65% silica) as the aggregate.

When AAC is mixed and cast, aluminium powder reacts with calcium hydroxide and water to form hydrogen. The hydrogen gas is dispersed through the AAC mix, creating a foam, doubling the volume of the raw mix. This process can create gas bubbles up to 3 millimetres (1/8 in) in diameter. At the end of the foaming process, the hydrogen escapes into the atmosphere and is replaced by air, resulting in a product weighing approximately 20% of the weight of conventional concrete.

Upon removal of the mold in which the AAC is cast, the material is solidified but remains soft. It is then cut into the desired shape (either blocks or panels), and placed in an autoclave chamber for 12 hours. During this steam pressure hardening process, temperatures reach 190 °C (374 °F) and the pressure reaches 800 to 1,200 kPa (8.0 to 12.0 bar; 120 to 170 psi). Under these conditions, quartz sand reacts with calcium hydroxide to form calcium silicate hydrate, which gives AAC its high strength and other properties. Because of the relatively low temperature used, AAC blocks are not considered to be a type of fired brick but rather a lightweight concrete masonry unit. After the autoclaving process, the material is stored and shipped to construction sites for use. Depending on its density, up to 80% of the volume of an AAC block is air. AAC's low density also accounts for its low structural compression strength. It can carry loads of up to 8,000 kPa (1,200 psi); approximately 50% of the compressive strength of regular concrete.

== Reinforced autoclaved aerated concrete ==
Reinforced autoclaved aerated concrete (RAAC) is a reinforced version of autoclaved aerated concrete, commonly used in roofing and wall construction. The first structural reinforced roof and floor panels were manufactured in Sweden, and production of the first autoclaved aerated concrete blocks began there in 1929. However, following the Second World War, Belgian and German technologies became market leaders for RAAC elements.

In Europe, RAAC gained popularity in the mid-1950s as a cheaper and more lightweight alternative to conventional reinforced concrete, with documented widespread use in several European countries, as well as Japan, and former territories of the British Empire.

RAAC was used in roof, floor, and wall construction due to its lighter weight and lower cost compared to traditional concrete. Additionally, RAAC was also used due to its fire resistance properties. The material does not require plastering to achieve fire resistance, and fire does not cause spalls. RAAC elements have also been used in Japan as walling units, due to their properties under seismic movement.

However, RAAC has also been shown to have limited structural reinforcement bar (rebar) integrity in 40 to 50-year-old roof panels. This was first observed in the 1990s, where the material was susceptible to failure without any visible signs of deterioration. This is often caused by RAAC's high susceptibility to water infiltration due to its porous nature, which causes corrosion of internal reinforcements in ways that are hard to detect externally. This places increased tensile stress on the bond between the reinforcement and concrete, lowering the material's service life. Due to this, detailed risk analyses are required on a structure-by-structure basis to identify areas in need of maintenance and lower the chance of catastrophic failure.

Public concerns around these weaknesses were first raised by engineers in the United Kingdom in 1995, following inspections of cracked units in British school roofs. Action was subsequently taken in 2022 when the Government Property Agency declared the material to be life-expired, and in 2023 when multiple buildings were found to have issues with their RAAC construction. This resulted in the partial or total closure of 174 schools at risk of a roofing collapse. These incidents caused an increase in apprehension among the public, as members of the public discovered that their buildings had been made using RAAC. This also raised alarm around the development of similar problems in other countries as RAAC saw widespread use.

In Toronto, Canada, the Ontario Science Centre (OSC), a major museum, permanently closed its original site on June 21, 2024, following a report indicating that deteriorated RAAC roof panels dating back to its opening in 1969 posed a safety risk. Draft documents were later obtained, suggesting that the report originally recommended routine repairs, but was revised to support the provincial government's preference to close the facility. Approximately 400 other public buildings in Ontario were understood to contain the material and were said to be under review at the time of the OSC closure, though no others were expected to be ordered vacated.

== Sustainability ==
The higher resource efficiency of autoclaved aerated concrete allows AAC to have a lower environmental impact than conventional concrete, from raw material processing to the disposal of aerated concrete waste. The production of aerated concrete blocks requires relatively little raw materials per cubic meter of product and material cost can be as low as a fifth of the production of other building materials. There is little loss of raw materials in the production process, and all production waste is returned to the production cycle. Production of aerated concrete requires less energy than for all other masonry products, thereby reducing the use of fossil fuels and associated carbon dioxide (CO_{2}) emissions. The curing process is also energy-efficient as steam curing occurs at relatively low temperatures, and the hot steam generated in the autoclaves is reused for subsequent batches.

== Advantages ==
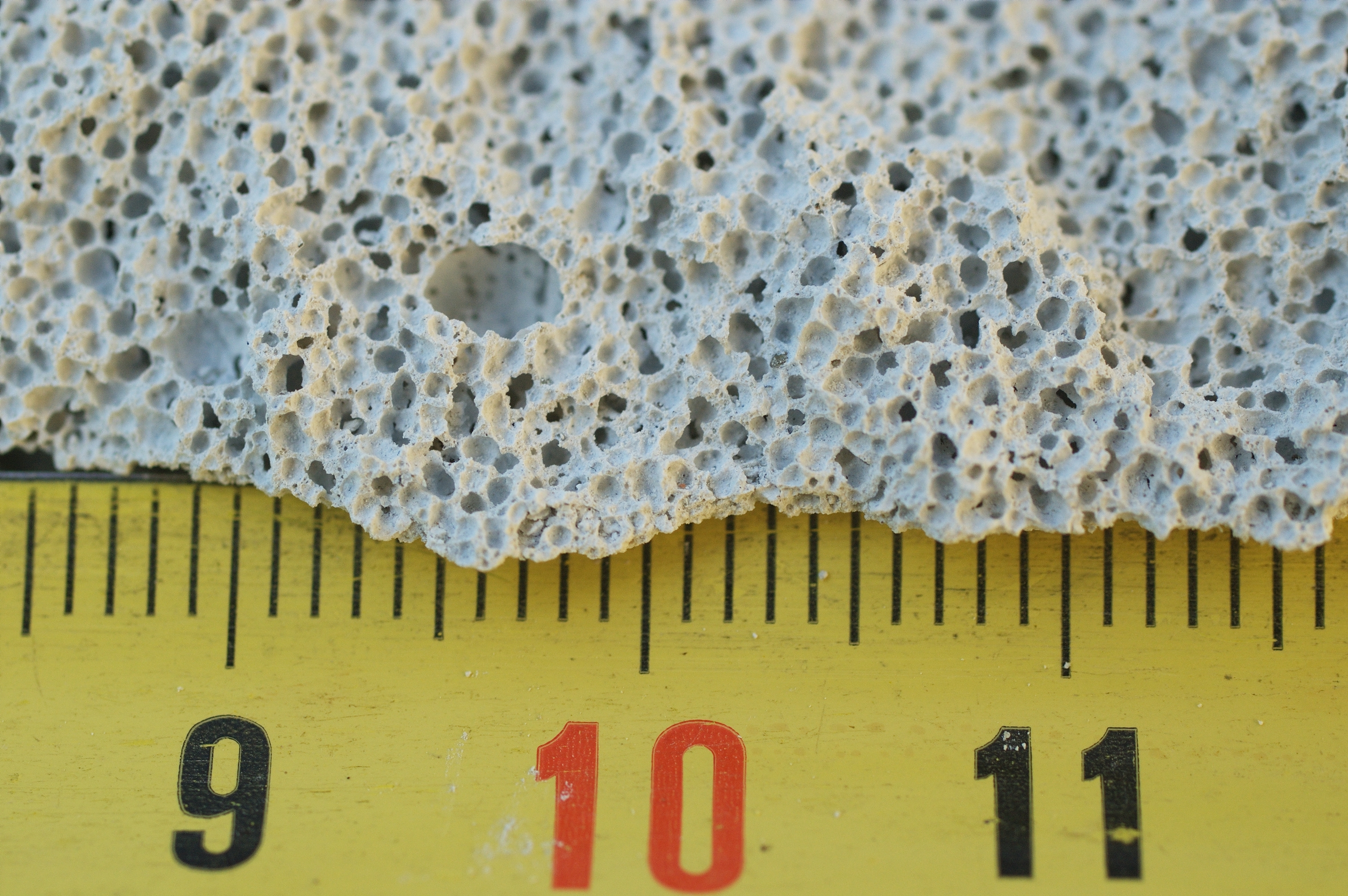
Closeup of structure

Autoclaved aerated concrete (AAC) has been used in construction since the early 20th century and is valued for its lightweight and insulating properties.

AAC possesses several characteristics that make it suitable for specific construction applications:

- Energy efficiency: Due to its cellular structure, AAC offers thermal resistance that may help reduce heating and cooling loads in buildings.
- Fire resistance: AAC exhibits good fire resistance; its mineral composition and porous structure can provide extended fire ratings under standard testing conditions.
- Workability: AAC can be cut and shaped using standard tools, allowing for precise fitting and reducing material waste on construction sites.
- Environmental profile: AAC generally has a lower embodied energy and environmental footprint compared to traditional concrete. In some contexts, it may contribute to achieving points in green building certification systems such as LEED.
- Low density: The material is significantly lighter than conventional concrete, which can simplify manual handling, reduce transportation demands, and may lower structural loads in seismic design scenarios.
- Construction efficiency: AAC blocks and panels are often available in larger dimensions than traditional masonry units, potentially reducing installation time and labour. However, the overall impact on construction schedules depends on site-specific logistics and integration with other systems.
- Moisture regulation: The vapor-permeable nature of AAC allows for limited water vapor diffusion, which can help moderate indoor humidity and mitigate moisture accumulation or condensation-related issues.
- Dimensional accuracy: Factory production techniques yield blocks and panels with tight tolerances, which can reduce the need for on-site trimming and minimize the use of finishing materials such as mortar or plaster.
- Durability: AAC is resistant to pests, mould, and typical climate variations. It maintains its structural and thermal performance over time under normal conditions, although its long-term durability may depend on design detailing and exposure environments.

== Disadvantages ==
Autoclaved aerated concrete (AAC) also presents several limitations, particularly in regions with construction practices that differ from monolithic masonry, such as the United Kingdom, where cavity wall systems are common.

- Specialized training: Installation of AAC requires construction techniques that may differ from those used with traditional masonry. As a result, builders may need targeted training to handle, cut and assemble AAC components effectively
- Shrinkage cracks: Non-structural shrinkage cracks may develop in AAC installations, particularly under humid conditions or after rainfall. This phenomenon is more frequently observed in low-quality blocks or those that have not undergone adequate steam-curing during production.
- Brittleness: AAC is more brittle than conventional clay bricks or dense concrete blocks. This characteristic necessitates careful handling during transport and installation to minimize breakage.
- Fixings and fasteners: Due to its porous and brittle composition, AAC requires specialized fasteners for securing fixtures such as cabinets or shelves. Long screws and wall anchors designed for AAC, gypsum board, or lightweight masonry are typically used. Conventional plastic wall plugs and masonry drill bits are generally unsuitable. In high-load applications, certified anchors may be required and drilling should be performed using high-speed steel (HSS) drill bits without hammer action to avoid cracking.
- Insulation limitations: AAC blocks manufactured at lower densities (e.g., 400 kg/m³ under European Standard B2.5) may require substantial wall thicknesses—often exceeding 500 mm—to meet thermal insulation standards in colder climates such as Northern Europe. This can offset space and cost benefits in some applications.
- Water sensitivity: The aerated structure of AAC contains fine air voids, which can absorb moisture. In freeze–thaw environments, absorbed water may expand upon freezing and cause damage to the block structure. Protective finishes and proper detailing are typically recommended in such conditions.
