= OISC =

OISC may refer to:

- Office of the Immigration Services Commissioner in the United Kingdom
- Oisc of Kent, an early king of Kent
- One-instruction set computer
