= Parliamentary Under-Secretary of State for Migration and Citizenship =

Ministerial position in the Government of the United Kingdom

United Kingdom Parliamentary Under-Secretary of State for Migration and Citizenship
- Royal Arms of His Majesty's Government

- Flag of the United Kingdom

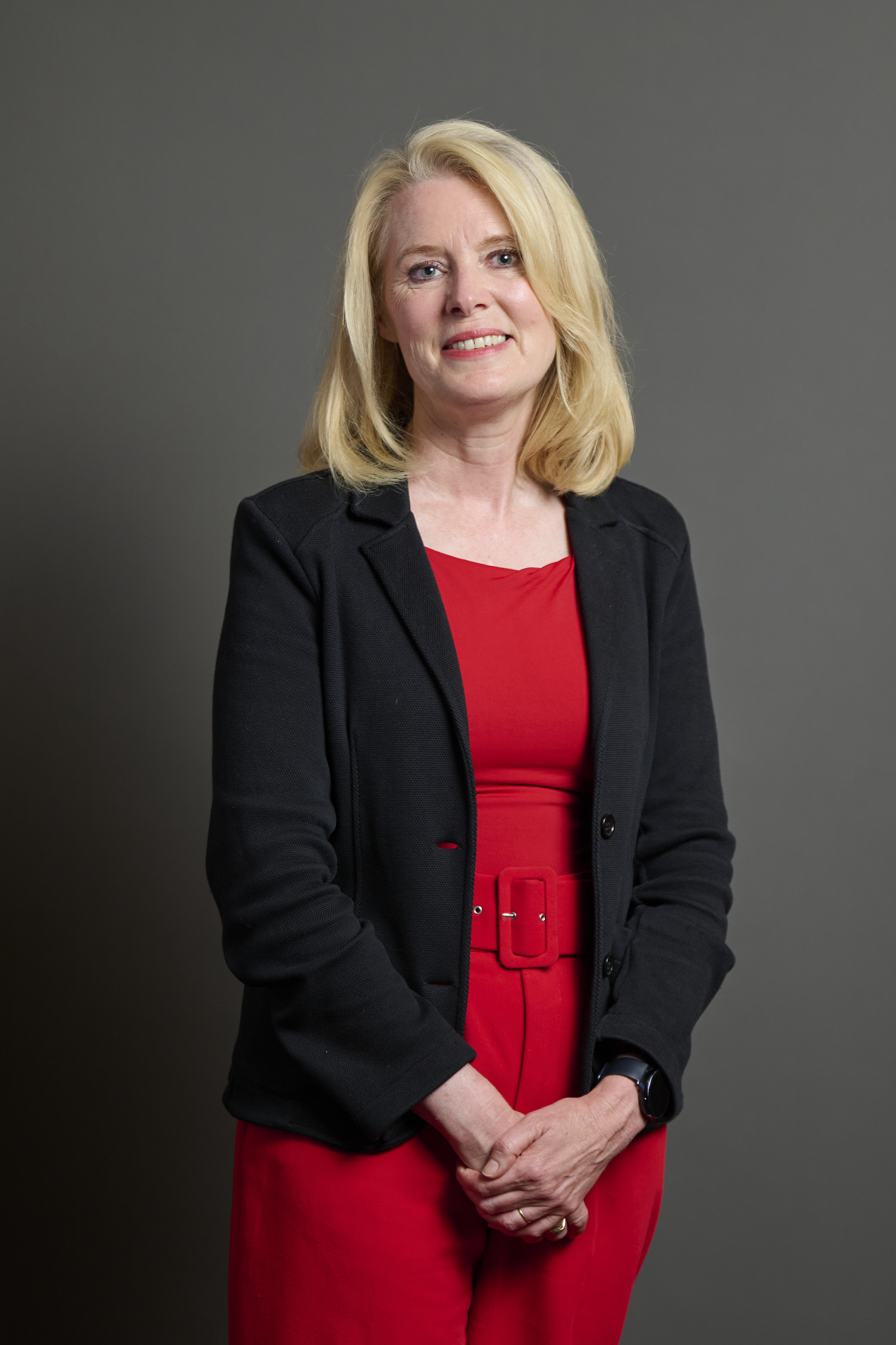
- Incumbent; Jo White since 22 July 2026
- Home Office; UK Visas and Immigration; HM Passport Office
- Style: Migration Minister (informal); The Right Honourable (within the UK and Commonwealth)
- Type: Minister of the Crown
- Status: Minister of State
- Member of: His Majesty's Government
- Reports to: Prime Minister of the United Kingdom; Home Secretary
- Seat: Westminster
- Nominator: Prime Minister
- Appointer: The Monarch; (on the advice of the Prime Minister)
- Term length: At His Majesty's pleasure
- Formation: 6 May 1979
- First holder: Tim Raison
- Salary: £115,824 per annum (2022) (including £86,584 MP salary)
- Website: Official website

The parliamentary under-secretary of state for migration and citizenship is a ministerial position in the Home Office of the Government of the United Kingdom.

From June 2017 to July 2019 and October 2022 to December 2023, the minister attended cabinet meetings as Minister of State for Immigration and was seen as one of the most senior minister of state positions in the Government.

The role was known as Parliamentary Under-Secretary of State for Future Borders and Immigration from 2020 to 2021 and Parliamentary Under-Secretary of State for Safe and Legal Migration from 2021 to 2022.

Following the resignation of Robert Jenrick in December 2023, the position was split into two roles: Minister of State for Countering Illegal Migration and Minister of State for Legal Migration and the Border.

== Responsibilities ==
As of 2022 the minister has responsibility for legal migration, illegal migration and asylum, including:

- UK points-based system
- Simplifying the immigration system and immigration rules
- Current and future visa system
- Asylum
- Net migration
- EU Settlement Scheme
- Nationality
- Windrush
- Modern slavery

== List of ministers ==
Name	Portrait	Term of office		Political party	Prime Minister	Notes
Minister of State for the Home Office
Tim Raison		6 May 1979	6 January 1983	Conservative	Margaret Thatcher	Minister of State with responsibility for the Immigration and Nationality Department
David Waddington		6 January 1983	13 June 1987	Conservative	Margaret Thatcher	Minister of State with responsibility for the Immigration and Nationality Department
Tim Renton		13 June 1987	25 July 1989	Conservative	Margaret Thatcher	Minister of State with responsibility for the Immigration and Nationality Department
Parliamentary Under-Secretary of State for the Home Office
Peter Lloyd		25 July 1989	28 November 1990	Conservative	Margaret Thatcher	Parliamentary Under-Secretary of State with responsibility for the Immigration and Nationality Department
Peter Lloyd		28 November 1990	15 April 1992	Conservative	John Major	Parliamentary Under-Secretary of State with responsibility for the Immigration and Nationality Department
Charles Wardle		15 April 1992	20 July 1994	Conservative	John Major	Parliamentary Under-Secretary of State with responsibility for the Immigration and Nationality Department
Minister of State for the Home Office
Emily Blatch, Baroness Blatch		20 July 1994	2 May 1997	Conservative	John Major	Minister of State with responsibility for the Immigration and Nationality Department
Parliamentary Under-Secretary of State for Immigration
Michael O'Brien		5 May 1997	8 June 2001	Labour	Tony Blair	
Minister of State for Asylum and Immigration
Barbara Roche		28 July 1999	11 June 2001	Labour	Tony Blair	
Jeff Rooker, Baron Rooker		11 June 2001	29 May 2002	Labour	Tony Blair	
Minister of State for Citizenship, Immigration and Community Cohesion
Beverley Hughes		29 May 2002	13 June 2003	Labour	Tony Blair	
Minister of State for Citizenship, Immigration and Counter-Terrorism
Beverley Hughes		13 June 2003	1 April 2004	Labour	Tony Blair	Resigned over illegal immigration visa scandal
Minister of State for Immigration, Citizenship and Nationality
Des Browne		1 April 2004	6 May 2005	Labour	Tony Blair	
Tony McNulty		16 May 2005	23 May 2006	Labour	Tony Blair	
Minister of State for Citizenship, Immigration and Nationality
Liam Byrne		23 May 2006	27 June 2007	Labour	Tony Blair	
Minister of State for Borders and Immigration
Liam Byrne		27 June 2007	3 October 2008	Labour	Gordon Brown	
Phil Woolas		3 October 2008	11 May 2010	Labour	Gordon Brown	
Minister of State for Immigration
Damian Green		13 May 2010	4 September 2012	Conservative	David Cameron	
Mark Harper		4 September 2012	8 February 2014	Conservative	David Cameron	
Minister of State for Security and Immigration
James Brokenshire		8 February 2014	14 July 2016	Conservative	David Cameron	
Minister of State for Immigration
Robert Goodwill		16 July 2016	11 June 2017	Conservative	Theresa May	
Brandon Lewis		11 June 2017	8 January 2018	Conservative	Theresa May	Attended meetings of the Cabinet
Caroline Nokes		8 January 2018	24 July 2019	Conservative	Theresa May	Attended meetings of the Cabinet
Parliamentary Under-Secretary of State for Immigration
Seema Kennedy		26 July 2019	16 December 2019	Conservative	Boris Johnson	
Kevin Foster		16 December 2019	14 February 2020	Conservative	Boris Johnson	
Parliamentary Under-Secretary of State for Future Borders and Immigration (Until December 2021) Parliamentary Under-Secretary of State for Safe and Legal Migration (From December 2021)
Kevin Foster		14 February 2020	7 September 2022	Conservative	Boris Johnson	
Minister of State for Immigration
Tom Pursglove		7 September 2022	25 October 2022	Conservative	Liz Truss	
Robert Jenrick		25 October 2022	6 December 2023	Conservative	Rishi Sunak	Attended meetings of the Cabinet
Role split with new Minister of State for Countering Illegal Migration Minister of State for Legal Migration and the Border
Tom Pursglove		7 December 2023	5 July 2024	Conservative	Rishi Sunak	
Parliamentary Under-Secretary of State for Migration and Citizenship
Seema Malhotra		9 July 2024	6 September 2025	Labour	Keir Starmer	
Mike Tapp		6 September 2025	22 July 2026	Labour	Keir Starmer	
Jo White		22 July 2026	Incumbent	Labour	Andy Burnham	
