= Apollo House =

Apollo House may refer to:

- Apollo House (Croydon): London, England
- Apollo House, Dublin; a derelict building in Dublin, Ireland which was occupied by activists and the homeless in December 2016
- Het Apollohuis: Eindhoven, Netherlands
