= National Border Targeting Centre =

The National Border Targeting Centre (NBTC) is a division and site of the Border Force in the United Kingdom, that collates and processes data on people entering and leaving the UK. It is the information-processing site that keeps track of migration into the UK. It operates 24 hours a day.

== History ==
It was opened on Thursday 11 March 2010 by the UK Border Agency (UKBA). The e-Borders systems had been launched in May 2009, with Project Semaphore running as a prototype from 2004. It replaced the Joint Border Operations Centre (JBOC) at Heathrow, a much smaller site.

== Structure ==
The site is run by the Home Office. It has around 200 staff in Wythenshawe, Manchester.

== Function ==
Passengers on flights entering and leaving the UK are screened by the NBTC. The airlines pass data (passenger name record, or PNR) on each passenger to the NBTC, including date of birth. The NBTC tracks former flights taken by each individual going back up to a decade, and determines whether an individual's flight history could be suspicious. Each individual is checked against criminal record databases. Exit checks are conducted at ferry ports connecting to European ports by the ferry operators.

It looks at the e-Borders Semaphore system for suspects. It tracks around 250 million passenger movements per year. It operates the Pre-Departure Checks Scheme.

== See also ==
- Academic Technology Approval Scheme
- Connect (computer system), HMRC system to detect black market employment in the UK
- Office of Biometric Identity Management
- Centaur, the information database held by HMRC
- Timatic, international travel database
- UK Visas and Immigration, partly headquartered in central Liverpool
