= Immigration and Nationality Directorate =

Defunct British government department

The Immigration and Nationality Directorate (IND) was part of the Home Office, a department of the United Kingdom government. The department had its headquarters in Croydon, South London, where it occupied thirteen buildings. The IND was responsible for inward migration to the United Kingdom, asylum applications and the recognition of refugees, nationality and citizenship and the removal and deportation of immigration offenders. The Immigration and Nationality Directorate was replaced by the Border and Immigration Agency on 1 April 2007, which was in turn subsumed into the UK Border Agency on 1 April 2008 and replaced by UK Visas and Immigration in 2013.

== Directorates ==
The IND was split into directorates with responsibility for different areas of its work. Some of those directorates were:

- The Nationality Directorate had its main offices in Croydon and was responsible for the consideration of applications for British nationality and for the issue of certificates of entitlement to the right of abode.
- The UK Immigration Service had its headquarters in Croydon and was responsible for controlling entry to the United Kingdom. It had two directorates:
  - The Border Control Directorate controlled ports of entry.
  - The Enforcement and Removals Directorate was responsible for the identification, monitoring, and removal or deportation of immigration offenders.
- The Managed Migration Directorate, with offices in Croydon, Liverpool and Sheffield, had responsibility for considering applications for permission to remain in the United Kingdom from those who had valid leave to enter or remain and from European nationals and their families.
- Work Permits UK, based in Sheffield, dealt with the issuing of work permits.

== Reorganisation ==
On 19 July 2006, the Home Secretary, John Reid confirmed that the IND would be hived off as an executive agency after a major reorganisation of the Home Office.. From April 2007 it became the Border and Immigration Agency (BIA). On 1 April 2008, the Border and Immigration Agency was incorporated into the new UK Border Agency.

== List of directors general ==
- 1995 to 1998: Timothy Walker
- 2002 to 2005: Bill Jeffrey
- 2005 to 2008: Lin Homer

2008 to 2013: Rob Whiteman
