= Government Property Agency =

Government Property Agency refers to:

- Government Property Agency (Hong Kong)
- Government Property Agency (United Kingdom)
