= Geoffrey Wardale =

Sir Geoffrey Charles Wardale, KCB (29 November 1919 – 18 December 2017) was a British civil servant.

Born on 29 November 1919, he was educated at Altrincham Grammar School and Queens' College, Cambridge, and served in the Army from 1940 to 1941. He then entered HM Civil Service as a temporary official in the Ministry of War Transport, being appointed to a permanent role by 1946. He subsequently served in the Ministry of Transport and the Department of the Environment, where he was promoted to Deputy Secretary in 1972 and then Second Permanent Secretary in 1978, serving until 1980. Wardale was appointed a Companion of the Order of the Bath in the 1974 New Year Honours and promoted to Knight Commander in the 1979 Birthday Honours.

After retiring, Wardale was called upon to carry out two inquiries. In 1981, he published the Wardale Report on the civil service's open structure. In 1983, he issued another report, this time on fraud in the Property Services Agency (PSA). This was critical of the PSA, concluding that the organisational culture was complacent around fraud. This occurred after the businessman Montague Alfred's appointment in 1982 by the minister Michael Heseltine as chief executive and second permanent secretary of the PSA (without open competition); when Alfred was asked about the report's allegations by members of parliament, he pointed out that only 0.005% of the PSA's budget was likely lost to fraud and that it would be impossible to completely stamp it out. Soon after, Alfred resigned over these statements as they were perceived to have clashed with the government's statements in response to Wardale's findings.

Wardale died on 18 December 2017.
