= Immigration Advice Authority =

The Immigration Advice Authority is the United Kingdom regulator of the immigration advice industry whose powers stem from the Immigration and Asylum Act 1999 as amended. It was called the Office of the Immigration Services Commissioner (OISC) until January 2025.

Although guidance notes and numerous online resources are available to help people applying to immigrate to the United Kingdom, some may also seek professional legal advice. In contrast to most areas of legal advice in the United Kingdom, immigration advice services are regulated. Unless an immigration adviser is regulated by another approved regulator (for example a solicitor, a barrister or a legal executive), they must be regulated by the OISC if they are providing advice from the United Kingdom. All those in the UK providing immigration advice and services must comply with the OISC's Code of Standards. "Immigration advice" is advice given relating to a specific application to enter or remain in the UK. "Immigration services" are those given when representing someone in relation to an immigration matter, for example, to the United Kingdom Visas & Immigration (UKVI) or a court or tribunal.

== Responsibilities ==
The OISC is responsible for:

- Admitting immigration advisers into its Regulatory Scheme,
- Maintaining and publishing the register of advisers,
- Prosecuting those that operate illegally outside of the Scheme,
- Regulating immigration advisers in accordance with the Commissioner’s Code of Standards,
- Receiving complaints about immigration advisers irrespective of whether or not they are regulated by the OISC, and
- Promoting good practice in the immigration advice sector.

The OISC maintains and publishes a register of those advisers that it has found fit and competent to provide immigration advice and services.

Legal advisers regulated by the OISC must complete a detailed regulation process. They can be regulated at 3 levels of competence:

- Level 1 – Initial advice
- Level 2 – Casework
- Level 3 – Advocacy and representation

The Commissioner may refuse or withdraw permission to practice if they believe that an adviser is not fit and competent to provide immigration advice and services. The Commissioner may also take other disciplinary action against advisers found in breach of the OISC Code of Standards. These decisions may be appealed to the First-tier Tribunal Immigration Services. Legal advisers making applications for people to come to or remain in the UK are required to provide their full details along with their OISC registration number with each application to the UKVI.

== Immigration Services Commissioners ==
The posts of Immigration Services Commissioner and Deputy Immigration Services Commissioner are Ministerial appointments, and the Commissioner is a corporation sole.

- John Scampion (October 2000–May 2005)
- Suzanne McCarthy (appointed to 2 consecutive 5 year terms 5 September 2005 – 4 September 2015)
- John Tuckett (2019–2025)
- Gaon Hart (12 December 2025–present)
