= Johan Axel Eriksson =

Swedish architect and inventor (1888–1961)

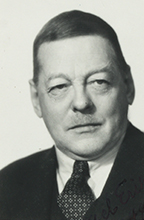
Johan Axel Eriksson

Johan Axel Eriksson (July 24, 1888 - June 6, 1961) a Swedish architect and inventor of autoclaved aerated concrete (AAC), was born in Österfärnebo and died in Stockholm. He was assistant to Henrik Kreüger at the KTH Royal Institute of Technology construction engineering section in Stockholm, researching building material thermal insulation, and graduated in 1916. Eriksson's experiments mixed calcined shale or burnt shale limestone, and aluminum powder in water, and upon almost accidentally exposing this to high temperature and pressure in an autoclave to speed up the curing process, obtained an insulating, light, compact gas concrete, or autoclaved lightweight concrete material. In the heat and pressure of the steam curing, the silica and lime components fused into a synthetic form of the natural volcanic rock tobermorite, a calcium silicate hydrate crystal. It was later sold as a "hardened aerated concrete" in 1929. In 1941 Eriksson became a member of the Royal Swedish Academy of Engineering Sciences. He obtained his title of engineer at KTH in 1942 with a doctoral thesis, "Building technology heating economy" ("Byggnadsteknisk värmeekonomi") on the containment of thermal losses in buildings. In the 1940s, the "Ytong" trade name was used and was produced with alum shale, which contained beneficial combustible carbon, but this formulation ceased in 1975 due to high radon gas emission from the finished material. Axel was production plant director from 1930-1954. Licenses, later acquired by outside companies, were sold to other countries and benefits from the invention were lost. The Ytong company became insolvent in 2004.

== AAC Development ==
Although the initial "air-cured gas concrete" walls were good at insulating and light, Eriksson attempted to solve the problem of cracking due to shrinkage by applying an autoclave's pressurized steam to the partially cured concrete mix. Experiments eventually led a process for curing lime, metal powder and a silica containing substance obtained from residues of oil shale pyrolysis. The result could be produced economically with high strength and fire resistance, was dimensionally stable, and as easy to work as wood, and in 1924 he patented it. In 1928 Eriksson licensed Carl August Carlén to produce AAC. Together, they produced in the Yxhult plant the first AAC blocks sold under the brand name Ytong (Yxhult combined with Swedish "betong" for concrete).

== See also ==
- Autoclaved aerated concrete
