= Property Services Agency =

Agency of the United Kingdom government

The Property Services Agency (PSA) was an agency of the United Kingdom government, in existence from 1972 to 1993. Its role was to "provide, manage, maintain, and furnish the property used by the government, including defence establishments, offices, courts, research laboratories, training centres and land".

== Early history ==
The PSA had its antecedents in the Ministry of Works and earlier departments dating back to the Office of Works. It was created as an autonomous agency in 1972 after the Ministry of Works had been absorbed into the Department of the Environment.

== First decade, 1972-1981 ==
The agency had the job of providing, equipping and maintaining a wide range of buildings and installations for government departments, and the armed services, as well as other bodies. It held and managed much of the government's civil estate, including government offices and establishments all over the United Kingdom as well as the diplomatic estate abroad. It managed Ministry of Defence property on its behalf, both at home and overseas. Within the agency was PSA Supplies, which provided furniture, transport and other services and operated on a trading fund basis. The clients it served were mainly government departments, but it had certain other clients, the most important of which was the Post Office, for which it provided services on repayment. In 1976, PSA Supplies was rebranded as The Crown Suppliers (TCS), becoming a self-funding business under the auspices of the PSA.

In 1977 the staff of the agency was about 50,000, of whom about 30,000 were industrial workers, including about 7,000 locally engaged staff overseas. Of the 20,000 non-industrials, more than half were specialist staff—architects, civil, mechanical and electrical engineers, quantity surveyors, building surveyors, estate surveyors, technicians and drawing office staff.

The agency undertook all types of construction work—from houses and barracks for the Services to offices, research facilities, airfields, dockyards and telephone exchanges for the Post Office. In 1977 it had about 1,500 major new works projects in various stages of design, and about 1,000 under construction. During that year the Agency's expenditure on new works were £400 million.

For the first decade of its existence the PSA was a centralised organisation which controlled all building and estates management works for government departments and the armed services. The PSA was the central budget holder for all such works, and let contracts with the private construction industry on behalf of its clients. This put the PSA in a monopoly position, and meant that client departments often had little control over their own estate management. In 1981 the recently elected Conservative government ruled that 70% of work should be contracted out to private consultants, with the PSA still retaining overall control.

== Corruption problems in the 1980s, and eventual privatisation ==
Evidence of corruption in PSA District Works Offices came to light in the early 1980s, and as a result the government appointed Sir Geoffrey Wardale to carry out an inquiry. The Wardale Report was published in October 1983. The PSA's then chief executive, Montague Alfred, was removed from his post because the Secretary of State concluded that Alfred's evidence to the committee was "contrary to government policy".

These problems, combined with the government's intention to pursue a programme of privatisation of public organisations, led in 1988 to the PSA being put on a commercial footing, and obliged to bid for project work in open competition with the private construction industry. In 1990, The Property Services Agency and Crown Suppliers Act paved the way for privatisation. Then on 1 April 1990 the PSA was split into two separate organisations:

- Property Holdings, which remained within government and managed the portfolio of civil estates.
- PSA Services, which operated as a commercial entity bidding for new building work from public sector organisations; equally, PSA Services was free to seek work in markets outside the public sector.

The progress towards full commercialisation was completed in 1992, when PSA Services was itself further split into three organisations:

- PSA Projects (the branch which dealt with new building projects), which was offered for sale to the private sector, and purchased by Tarmac in 1992. (Although nominally a sale, the transaction was eventually estimated by the National Audit Office to have cost the government £81.3 million). From October 1993 it traded as TBV Consult, later being renamed TPS Consult in 1997, and becoming part of Carillion in a demerger in 1999.
- PSA Building Management (the branch which maintained the existing estate) was divided into five regional businesses to be sold individually.
- PSA International (which looked after the overseas diplomatic and military estates) which was closed down in 1993.
- The Crown Suppliers (formerly PSA Supplies) was subject to a separate but abortive privatisation in 1991. The bulk of the business was closed with the exception of its Liverpool Office which remained trading within the public sector as The Buying Agency (TBA).

After the break-up of the PSA many government departments took back responsibility for their estates management, and set up their own property management departments. The largest of these is the Defence Infrastructure Organisation, looking after the military sites and land operated by the Ministry of Defence.

In 2018 a new centralised property management agency was set up, the Government Property Agency.

== Organisation and location ==
The headquarters of the PSA were in Croydon, Greater London, occupying space in several 1960s office blocks including the Whitgift Centre, Lunar House and Apollo House. The PSA also had offices in central London, and a regional network of offices throughout the UK.

The headquarters organisation consisted of various offices and Directorates, including the Directorate of Architectural Services (DAS), the Directorate of Post Office Services (DPOS), the Directorate of Civil Engineering Services (DCES), and the Directorate of Building and Quantity Surveying Services (DBQSS). The PSA also provided building and engineering services to the armed forces, such as the services provided by the Directorate of Works (Air) (DW(AIR)) for the RAF. The purpose of the Directorates was to set policy and draft the technical standards and specifications to be used in building works. The headquarters organisation also had direct control of flagship construction projects such as the Queen Elizabeth II Conference Centre in London.

Also located in Croydon was the PSA's central facility for training architectural and engineering draughtsmen, the Drawing Office Training Centre (DOTC), in 'C' Block in the Whitgift Centre in the 1970s, moving to Quest House in 1977.

The accounts section of the PSA was located in Ashdown House, Hastings which was originally built in 1966. Also located at Ashdown House, was the Directorate of Information Technology and Management Operating Systems (DITMOS), charged with providing IT procurement and database systems for the PSA. In 1985, 1,500 civil servants were employed at Ashdown House.

There was a UK regional network for the rest of the PSA's building and estates management work. There were offices for Scotland and Wales, and offices in the English regions (in London, Leeds, Cambridge, Hastings, Reading, Bristol, Birmingham and Manchester; the Manchester office included Northern Ireland in its territory). Under the regional offices were Area Works Offices, and then at a further sub-level operated the District Works Offices (DWOs). The main function of the DWOs was to carry out maintenance and small building projects. The DWOs were mostly situated in urban centres where there were a number of government buildings to maintain, or on military installations.

== Chief Executive ==
The Chief Executive of the PSA had the status of Second Permanent Secretary in the Civil Service structure, and was accountable to the Secretary of State for the Environment.

- 1972–1974: John Cuckney (later Baron Cuckney)
- 1974–1981: W R (Sir Robert) Cox
- 1982–1984: Montague Alfred
- 1984–1990: Sir Gordon Manzie
- 1990–1991: Patrick Brown (later Sir)
- 1991–1993: Sir Geoffrey Chipperfield
- 1993–1994: Philip Fletcher

== See also ==
- Government Property Agency (United Kingdom)
