= Rob Whiteman =

Retired public sector leader

Rob Whiteman CBE is a retired public sector leader, most latterly the Chief Executive of the Chartered Institute of Public Finance and Accountancy (CIPFA), from September 2013 to June 2024.

Before moving to CIPFA, Whiteman was a senior civil servant in the British Civil Service working as the Chief Executive of the UK Border Agency.

Prior to this role he was the managing director of the local government Improvement & Development Agency (IDeA), a job he had been appointed to in 2010. Between 2005 and 2010 he worked in local government as the Chief Executive of the London Borough of Barking and Dagenham Council. A qualified Chartered Public Finance Accountant (CPFA), previously he was the Director of Resources at the London Borough of Lewisham.

As a non-executive, since October 2025 he has served as Chair of the NHS Cluster of NHS Dorset, NHS Somerset and NHS Bath & North East Somerset, Swindon and Wiltshire. He was appointed Lead NED of MoJ in May 2026. From 2022 to 2025 he was Chair of University Hospitals Dorset NHS Foundation Trust, having held several other NHS appointments. Rob was appointed Chair of NHS Dorset in April 2025, NHS Dorset is the Integrated Care Board for the Dorset region. He is also a non-executive at National Highways.

Rob has served as a technical advisor to the Board of the International Federation of Accounts (IFAC), with previous roles including Chair of Audit and Board Member at the UK’s Department of Energy and Climate Change (DECC)
