= Apollo House (Croydon) =

High rise building in Croydon, London, England

Coordinates: 51.3771°N 0.0982°W

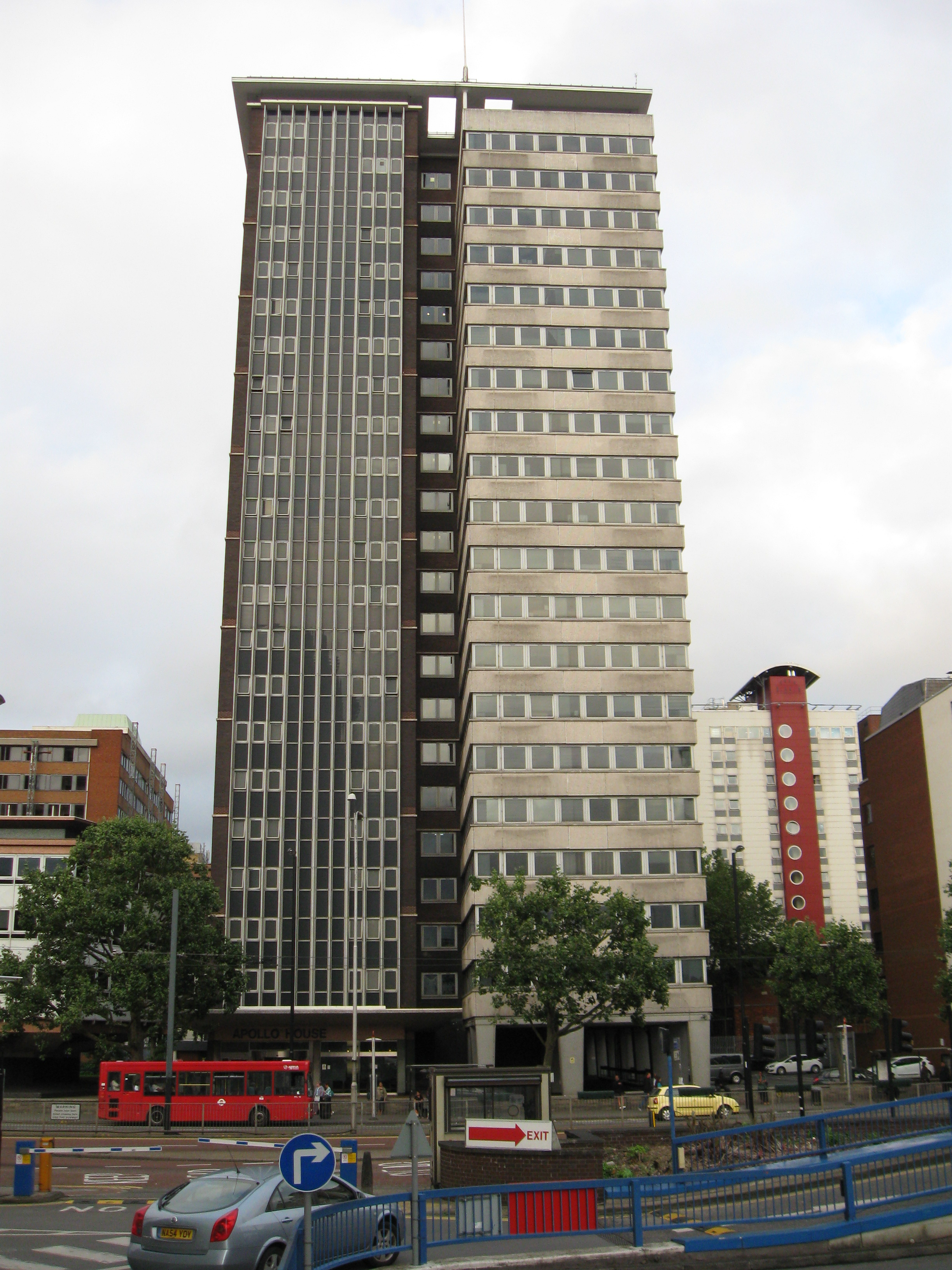
- Apollo House
- Interactive map of the Apollo House area

General information
- Location: 36 Wellesley Road, Croydon, United Kingdom
- Construction started: 1967
- Completed: 1970

Height
- Height: 64 m (210 ft)

Technical details
- Floor count: 22

Design and construction
- Architects: Denis Crump & Partners

References
- http://www.skyscrapernews.com/buildings.php?id=1573

Apollo House is a 22-storey high-rise office building at 36 Wellesley Road in the London Borough of Croydon, London, England. In common with a neighbouring building Lunar House and others developed by Harry Hyams, the building's name was inspired by the Apollo 11 Moon landing in 1969.

Like Lunar House, Apollo serves as the headquarters of UK Visas and Immigration, a division of the Home Office in the United Kingdom. The buildings at one time hosted the headquarters of the Property Services Agency (PSA), along with other 1960s office blocks, including those forming part of the Whitgift Centre. The PSA also had offices in central London, and a regional network of offices throughout the UK. Up until 2008, part of the Foreign and Commonwealth Office's Services section were based on floors 17 and 18. Now, the Home Office possesses this area.

The building is not to be confused with the fictional 'Apollo House', a block of flats occupied by the main characters in the TV series Peep Show (2003–2015). The show is set in Croydon, but the building used for filming was Zodiac Court, on London Road in West Croydon.
