= Connect (computer system) =

Datamining computer system

Connect is a social network analysis software data mining computer system developed by HMRC (UK) that cross-references businesses’ and people's tax records with other databases to establish fraudulent or undisclosed (misdirected) activity.

== History ==
HMRC introduced Connect in the summer of 2010; it was not fully functioning. Around 350 HMRC employees are involved with Connect, who work with an analytical compliance environment. Connect was developed by BAE Systems Applied Intelligence (former Detica in Surrey) for £45m.

From September 2016, Connect has interfaced with financial information from British Overseas Territories; these have been known tax havens. From 2017 Connect has interfaced with around sixty other OECD countries.

== Sources of information ==
Connect cross-references information from many other UK government databases, including:

- Adverts on the internet e.g. Rightmove and Zoopla
- Bank accounts and pensions
- Council tax
- Credit and debit card transactions, going back four years
- Companies House
- DVLA
- DWP (former Benefits Agency)
- eBay and other internet marketplaces
- The electoral roll
- Gas Safe Register
- Insurance companies
- Land Registry - for capital gains tax

HMRC also independently looks at Google Earth.

== Technology ==
The system deploys the chi-squared test and Benford's law to look for anomalous tax receipts. The system is operated by the Risk and Intelligence Service (RIS) division of HMRC. The software combines analytic tools (Enterprise Guide) from SAS Institute, which collects the information, and NetReveal from BAE Systems AI, which collates it into meaningful information.

It deploys predictive analytics similar to credit scoring, and has dynamic benchmarking. It looks for correlation of income with lifestyle, by comparing with multivariate statistical models; outliers from expected variance will be investigated.

=== Definition of data ===
Undeclared work is plotted on mapping software, allowing undeclared work to be seen at a street by street level.

== Purpose ==
Connect looks for income disparities, often caused by undeclared income. If someone drives an expensive car, but does not have the income to run one or afford one, Connect can discover this.

== See also ==
- Mosaic (geodemography)
- National Border Targeting Centre, UK Government computing centre in south Manchester that traces illegal and suspicious immigration into the UK, via cross-border databases
- Government Connect, part of Government Secure Intranet, a computer communications systems between UK local authorities
- Tax fraud schemes and detection
- Tax information exchange agreement
- Unexplained wealth order
