= Mary Ney =

British public servant

Dame Mary Ney DBE
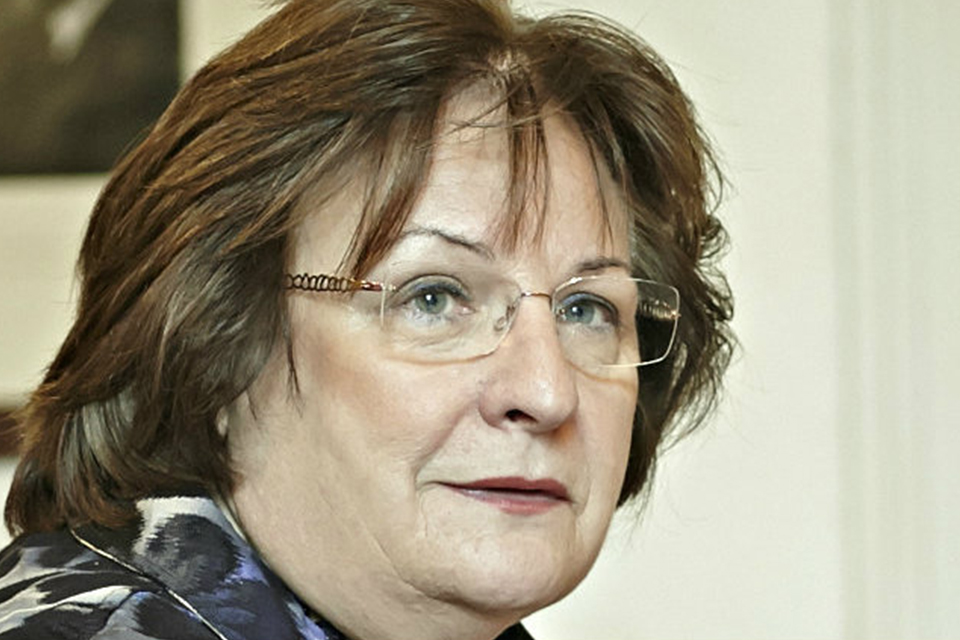
- Born: Mary Ney; 30 August 1949 (age 77)
- Education: University of London; Regent Street Polytechnic
- Occupation: Public servant

Dame Mary Ney DBE (born 30 August 1949) is a British public servant who was chief executive of the Royal Borough of Greenwich from 2000 and 2014.

== Early life and education ==
Mary Ney was born to parents John and Lena Ney on 30 August 1949. She studied at Notre Dame High School in Southwark before studying mathematics at the University of London, graduating in 1970 and completing a master's degree in the same subject in 1971. She completed a postgraduate diploma in management studies at the Regent Street Polytechnic in 1975.

== Career ==
Ney worked at London Borough of Southwark from 1979 until she became director of social services and housing at the London Borough of Harrow in 1992. She became chief executive of Royal Borough of Greenwich in 2000, a role she continued to hold for fourteen years, ending with a salary of £185,000. The council was awarded Council of the Year in 2013.

=== Later work ===
She was brought in as a supporting commissioner at Rotherham Metropolitan Borough Council in February 2015 following scandals around child sexual exploitation, as one of five commissioners including Stella Manzie. She succeeded David Meyers as the lead commissioner in March 2017. As commissioner, she "helped to improve performance and rebuild the trust of local residents" including suspending the licences of forty taxi drivers.

She was a non-executive director for the Department of Communities and Local Government from 2016 to 2018. Ney produced a review in October 2017 for the Ministry of Housing, Communities and Local Government called "Review of the Governance and Transparency of Local Enterprise Partnerships". In August 2019, she was appointed to lead a review into financial oversight of further education colleges, and in August 2020 led a rapid review into the management of local COVID-19 outbreaks.

She is a trustee of the Catholic Agency for Overseas Development (CAFOD) and the Roman Catholic Archdiocese of Southwark.

== Honours ==
Ney was made a Dame Commander of the British Empire (DBE) in the 2019 New Year Honours for services to local government.
