= Robert Cox (civil servant) =

British civil servant (1922–1981)

Sir William Robert Cox
- Born: 2 January 1922; Lancashire, UK
- Died: 27 June 1981 (aged 69)
- Education: Christ's College, Cambridge
- Occupation: Civil servant

Sir William Robert Cox, KCB (2 January 1922 – 27 June 1981) was a British civil servant.

Cox attended Christ's College, Cambridge, before he entered HM Civil Service in 1941. He served in the Foreign Office before transferring to the Ministry of Town and Country Planning in 1950, which subsequently became the Ministry of Housing and Local Government. There he worked on regional planning and the reforms to the planning system of the 1960s. He was Director-General of HM Prison Service from 1970 to 1973 and then in 1974 became Deputy Chief Executive of the Property Services Agency (PSA). Later in 1974, he was appointed Chief Executive of the PSA and Second Permanent Secretary at the Department of the Environment, serving until his retirement on health grounds in 1981; he died on 27 June that year. He had been appointed to the Order of the Bath, as a Companion in 1971 and a Knight Commander in 1976.
