= Lunar House =

Office building in Croydon, London, England

Coordinates: 51°22′42″N 0°5′54″W

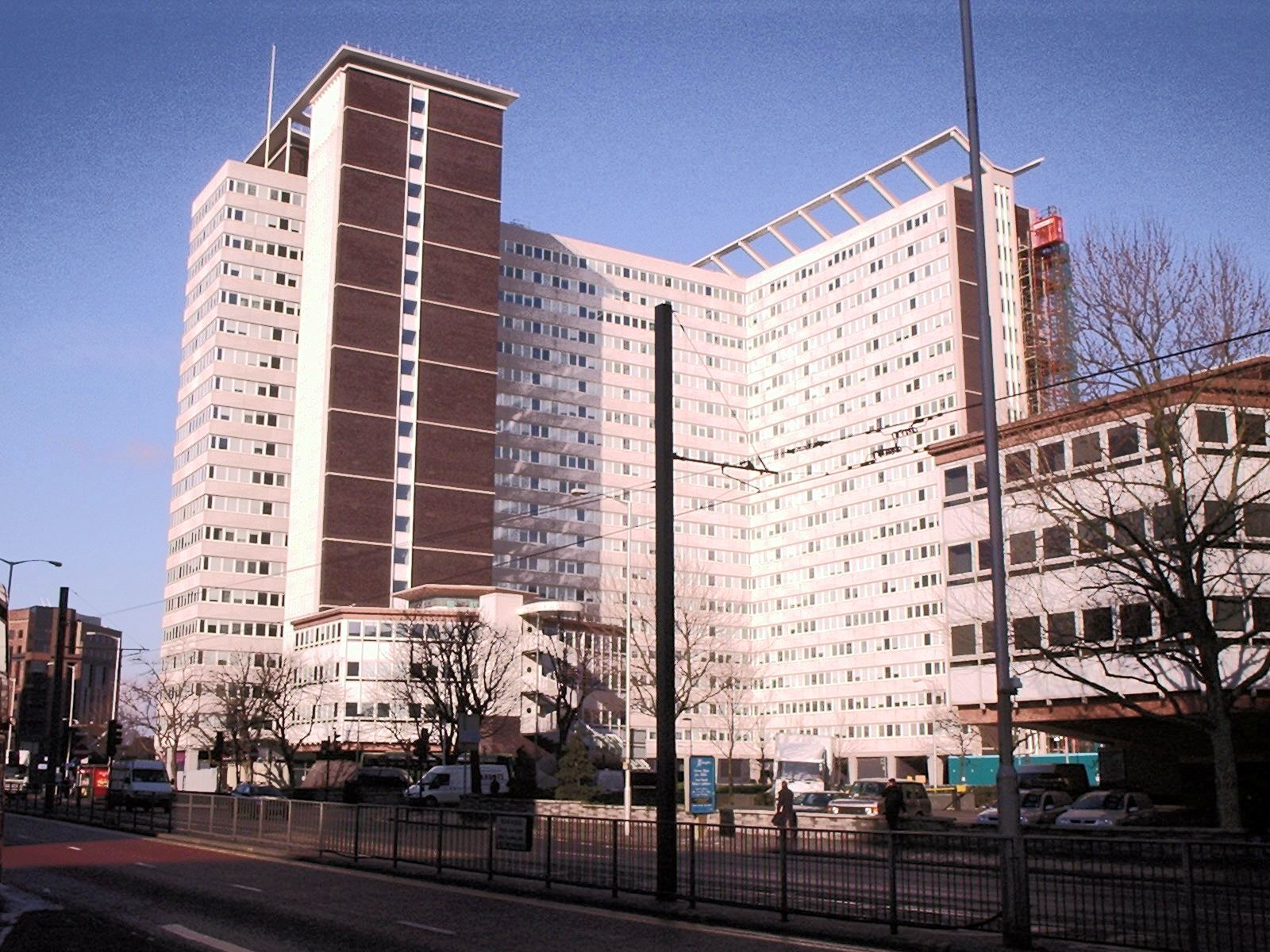
Lunar House, Croydon

Lunar House is a now vacant 20-storey office block in Croydon, in South London. It is situated at 40 Wellesley Road, on its east side, and formerly housed the headquarters of UK Visas and Immigration, a division of the Home Office in the United Kingdom. In 2024 the Home Office moved round the corner to Ruskin Square.

== The building ==
The building was completed in 1970. In common with a neighbouring building Apollo House and others developed by Harry Hyams, the building's name was inspired by the landing of Apollo 11 on the Moon in 1969. During the 1970s and 1980s the building housed some offices of the Property Services Agency.

== Immigration service ==
The building's name has become synonymous with the Immigration function of the Home Office, and is perceived by the British public as the front line of Britain's immigration service as the main Public Enquiry Office (PEO) is based here.

Services and facilities at Lunar House have been criticised in the past. In the summer of 2004, Her Majesty's Inspectorate of Prisons conducted unannounced inspections of short-term holding facilities attached to immigration reporting centres, and found particular problems at Lunar House: "Lunar House is the main route through which families are detained at Oakington Reception Centre. In spite of this, it had inadequate child protection procedures, and staff were not alert to the need to ensure that agreed safeguards on the detention of children were implemented."

In 2005, a report by the South London Citizens enquiry into service provision by the Immigration and Nationality Directorate found that "It was perceived that minimum standards of comfort afforded to British citizens do not apply to migrants waiting for services at Lunar House. Areas of immediate concern include the quality of facilities for applicants, the quality and fairness of transactions, the quality of IT and record keeping and the working conditions of staff." Lunar House was subsequently refurbished in 2005. At present access to the building requires airport-style security checks.

In 2006, the Home Office announced that it would investigate claims of a "sex-for-visas" scheme operated from Lunar House. Subsequently, an official was suspended after being recorded making arrangements to pay an applicant for sex.

== Public Enquiry Office ==
The Public Enquiry Offices offer a same-day service, at a premium fee, for considering straightforward applications for permission to extend one's stay in the United Kingdom or stay in the country permanently (known as 'leave to remain' and 'settlement'). They cannot consider complex applications.

Most applications can be considered and decided on the same day in a process that normally lasts approximately two and a half hours. Most applications are granted on Biometric Residence Permit cards which are not produced at the office, but generated separately and sent to customers by courier.
