= Monty Alfred =

British businessman and civil servant

- Born: Arnold Montague Alfred; 21 March 1925; Surrey
- Died: 26 July 2011 (aged 86)
- Education: Imperial College London, London School of Economics
- Occupations: Businessman and civil servant

Arnold Montague Alfred (21 March 1925 – 26 July 2011), known as Montague Alfred or Monty Alfred, was a British businessman and civil servant.

Born in Surrey on 21 March 1925, Alfred was the son of a Russian émigré who ran a series of business ventures (not always successfully). He was evacuated to Norfolk and Lancaster as a child. He attended Imperial College London and the London School of Economics, before serving as head of economics at Courtaulds from 1953 to 1969. In 1969, he was appointed director of planning at the British Printing Corporation and in 1971 became chairman of its publishing division. He restructured it and was involved in establishing Usborne.

After leaving in 1981, he was appointed Chief Executive of the Property Services Agency and Second Permanent Secretary at the Department of the Environment in 1982, serving until 1984. He was tasked with reforming the PSA and introducing ideas from the private sector, but met with opposition from civil servants and resigned after being accused of complacency when dealing with corruption within the PSA (he refused to guarantee to parliament that corrupt practices would not recur in the PSA, which had over 400 local offices and dealt with 2.5 million contracts a year). He then set up his own publisher, Regimental Press, and worked for the Chinese businessman Au Bak Ling. He was chairman of two London synagogues and of the Union of Liberal and Progressive Judaism and the Ideology and Theology Think Tank. He died on 26 July 2011.
