= Stella Manzie =

British public servant (born 1960)

Dame Stella Manzie DBE
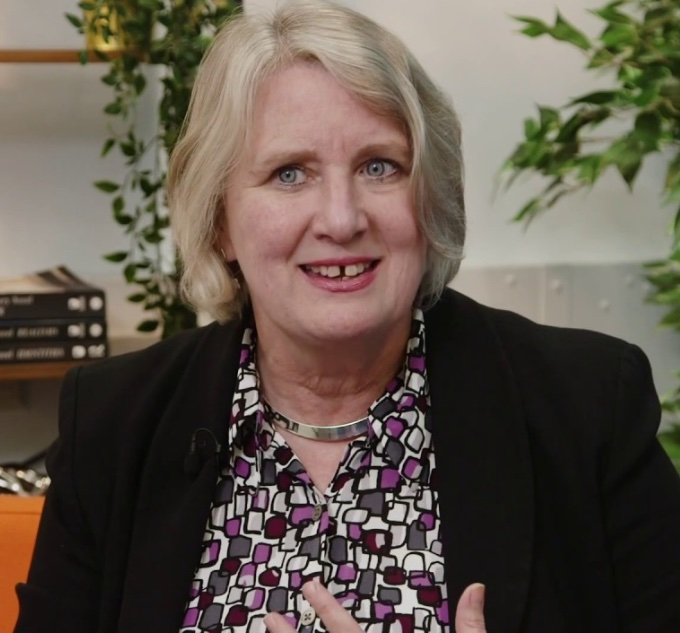
- Born: Stella Gordon Manzie; 13 June 1960 (age 66)
- Education: Newnham College, Cambridge
- Occupation: Public servant

Dame Stella Gordon Manzie DBE (born 13 June 1960) is a British public servant.

== Early life ==
Stella Manzie was born on 13 June 1960 to senior civil servant Gordon Manzie and his wife, Rosalind. She was educated at Hertfordshire and Essex Girls' High School and Fettes College before studying for an English degree at Newnham College, Cambridge. She completed postgraduate study at the Polytechnic of Central London and University of Birmingham, the latter in Local Government and Health in 1992.

== Career ==
Manzie became an administrative assistant for the Association of County Councils in 1982, before becoming an administrative officer for the Society of Local Authority Chief Executives and Senior Managers in 1984. She worked as a team leader in Birmingham City Council 1987–1988 before becoming a management consultant in Price Waterhouse Management Consultants in 1988, a role she held before returning to local government in 1992, when she worked as borough director for Redditch Borough Council, where she was the youngest council chief executive in the country. During her time at Redditch Borough Council, she "oversaw a 25 per cent cut in spending and cull of senior management".

In 1997 she became chief executive of West Berkshire Council before moving onto Coventry City Council in 2001. In her seven years as chief executive of Coventry City Council, she oversaw its improvement from a start as one of the worst-performing local authorities in the country.

She worked as a senior civil servant in the Scottish Government from 2008 to 2011, first as Director General for Finance and Corporate Services, then as Director General for Justice and Communities.

After that, she returned to local government, as Chief Executive of Barking and Dagenham London Borough Council 2011–2012 in the run-up to the 2012 Summer Olympics. She was brought in as one of five commissioners including Mary Ney for Rotherham Metropolitan Borough Council in 2015 following scandals around child sexual exploitation, in which role she "steered it through its recovery". She was interim Chief Executive for Birmingham City Council from 2017 to 2018, which had also previously been struggling with child protection and a range of other issues. During her time running Birmingham City Council, Unite the Union leader Len McCluskey accused her of "taking a hard line" with striking bin workers, opposing the union's proposed deal, and a local Unite the Union leader called for her resignation, which council leader Ian Ward described as "wholly inappropriate".

== Other offices ==
Manzie has been a visiting fellow at the Open University since 2013. She was chair of Cambridge Literary Festival from 2013 to 2015, and has been a trustee of the Esmée Fairbairn Foundation from 2017. She has was a non-executive director of HM Treasury.

== Honours ==
Manzie was made an Officer of the Order of the British Empire in 2001, a Commander in 2007, and a Dame Commander in 2018 for services to local government.
