= E-Borders =

e-Borders was an advance passenger information programme which aimed to collect and store information on passengers and crew entering and leaving the United Kingdom. Passengers details were to be checked against terror and criminal watch lists before being stored on the e-borders database. Due to European law on free movement EU carriers and ports supply information to the UK Border Agency on a voluntary basis; however in March 2012 Damian Green said that by April e-Borders would be collecting information on all passengers on 100% of non-EEA flights to the UK. The information of the passengers and crew was to be collected by the airline, train operating company, ferry and other carriers and ports and is then passed on to the e-Borders programme via the Carrier Gateway provided by Serco. In 2014 it was announced that the system would be scrapped.

Under the terms of the Data Protection Act 1998 passengers and crew may request to view all their records held by the e-Borders programme via the UK Border Agency website.

== History ==
The project was brought in by the then Labour government in 2007. It was hoped that information on all passengers entering and leaving the UK could be achieved by 2014. The project which is provided by the Trusted Borders consortium led by Raytheon and includes Serco, Detica, Accenture and Qinetiq. Raytheon had its contract terminated in July 2010 after a series of delays after being paid £188 million of its £742 million contract and was later replaced by IBM. However, the e-Borders programme suffered further delays after Raytheon's contract was terminated as sea and rail passengers are still not covered by e-Borders.

In March 2014 Charles Montgomery, Director General of the UK’s Border Force, announced before the Home Affairs Select Committee, that the e-Borders programme would be terminated. The search for a new supplier has been underway since 2013.

In August 2014 a binding arbitration tribunal awarded Raytheon a total of £224m in compensation against the Home Office for the incorrect termination of their contract.

== Mandatory data ==
The mandatory data requested in the legislation falls into three groups:

- For passengers, the travel document information (TDI) which are the data held in the machine-readable zone of the passport or identity document. This is known in the airline industry as advance passenger information (API) data;
- For crew members, their TDI; and
- Service information (for example, number, name of carrier, departure and arrival points).

== Additional data ==
Additional data is collected for carriers own purposes and is only required if it is known to the carrier; this includes:

- Passenger name
- Address
- Telephone number(s )
- Ticketing information
- Travel itinerary
