= Gordon Manzie =

Sir Andrew Gordon Manzie, KCB (3 April 1930 – 24 September 2014) was a British civil servant and chief executive of the Property Services Agency.

== Early life ==
Andrew Gordon Manzie was born in Edinburgh on 3 April 1930 to parents John Mair, a railway clerk, and Catherine Manzie. He grew up in a council house in Stenhouse, where he attended primary school and was joint dux. Manzie won a bursary to the Royal High School of Edinburgh.

== Career ==
In 1947 he joined the civil service initially as a clerical officer in the central registry of the Scottish Home and Health Department. After his executive officer exam, he joined the Ministry of Supply in London. In 1949 he undertook his two-year national service with the RAF at Hereford and Bridgnorth, before returning to his posting in London in 1951.

At the age of 30 he graduated with a BSc in economics from the London School of Economics following a course of part-time study.

Manzie then was appointed to a number of posts including private secretary to the permanent secretary at the Ministry of Aviation, and secretary to the Edwards Committee of Inquiry into Civil Air Transport, before moving to the Scottish Office, and later the Department of Trade and Industry.

In 1984, Manzie was appointed second permanent secretary at the Department for the Environment and chief executive of the Property Services Agency. He was appointed to resolve problems of widespread corruption at the agency. His work led to the prosecutions of a number of the agency's staff.

He retired from the civil service in 1990, and became chairman of Anglo Japanese Construction Ltd, winning a contract to build Tsing Ma Bridge. He was also the chairman and director of companies in the Trafalgar House group winning the contract for Jiangyin Bridge.

== Personal life ==
Manzie married Rosalind Clay in 1955. They had two children, a son, Ian Manzie, and a daughter, Stella Manzie. He also had two grandchildren Ellen and Aodh Manzie. He died on 24 September 2014 in Harlow.

== Honours ==
In 1983, Manzie was appointed Companion of The Most Honourable Order of the Bath. In 1987, Manzie was appointed Knight Commander of the Order of the Bath. He was made an honorary fellow of the London School of Economics in 2003.
