= UKVisas =

UKVisas was the executive arm of the British Government responsible for processing applications for entry clearance to the United Kingdom. It was an executive agency jointly run by the Foreign and Commonwealth Office and the Border and Immigration Agency. On 1 April 2008, UKVisas was absorbed into the newly created UK Border Agency.

== See also ==
- Visa (document)
