= Government Property Agency (United Kingdom) =

British government agency

Executive agency overview
- Formed: 1 April 2018
- Jurisdiction: Government of the United Kingdom
- Minister responsible: Minister for the Cabinet Office
- Executive agency executives: Pat Ritchie, chair; Mark Bourgeois, chief executive
- Parent department: Cabinet Office
- Parent Executive agency: Office of Government Property
- Website: www.gov.uk/government/organisations/government-property-agency

The Government Property Agency (GPA) is an executive agency of the Cabinet Office, a department of the Government of the United Kingdom. Formed in April 2018, it is responsible for managing government property and advising government departments in their management of property.

== History ==
A similar organisation to the GPA, the Property Services Agency, existed between 1972 and 1993. It was disbanded in favour of government departments taking on responsibility for managing their own property. The GPA was created in shadow form in 2017 and formally established as an executive agency of the Cabinet Office in 2018.

== Functions ==
The GPA delivers "property and workplace solutions" to the various departments of the United Kingdom government. It is designed to introduce a "portfolio-led approach to managing central government general purpose property as a strategic asset". It is, or is becoming, the legal owner of the government general purpose estate, and works with government departments to manage their property. The GPA is a national organisation, working with client departments across the country. In addition to London, they have offices in Swindon, Coventry, Newport, Manchester, Leeds, and Norwich.

The GPA describes themselves as "behav[ing] like a commercial real estate company". They are responsible for managing the government's central estate offices and warehouses, supporting government departments as tenants, providing workplace services to government departments and providing portfolio advice to support departments' objectives.

== Governance ==
The GPA is governed by a Board, and managed by the GPA Executive Committee. The GPA Board's principal function is to advise the chief executive and the Cabinet Office (as its sponsor department) on the strategic direction of the Agency. The Board:

- sets the strategic and business direction for the GPA within the scope of the Minister for the Cabinet Office's strategic priorities
- approves the GPA's Annual Business Plan and Corporate Strategy
- provides constructive challenge to the GPA on the delivery of its strategic objectives
- ensures that the GPA has the capability to deliver and is able to meet current and future needs
- promotes the overall culture and values of the GPA
- has established and oversees sound corporate governance structures for the GPA
- ensures sound financial management of the GPA
- scrutinises the allocation of financial and human resources within the GPA in line with its functions and priorities
- sets the GPA's risk appetite, and ensures controls are put in place to manage risk and ensure value for money
- monitors the performance of the GPA and will agree any remedial actions required, ensuring clear, consistent, comparable performance information is used to drive improvements
- approves the GPA's Annual Report and Accounts via scrutiny from the GPA Audit and Risk Committee, a sub-Committee of the Board.

The board is chaired by Pat Ritchie and includes the chief executive, finance director and the director General of Government Property.
