= UK Border Agency =

Defunct British border control agency

- Abbreviation: UKBA

Agency overview
- Formed: 1 April 2008
- Preceding agencies: Border and Immigration Agency; UKvisas; port of entry functions of HM Revenue and Customs
- Dissolved: 1 April 2013
- Superseding agency: Border Force; UK Visas and Immigration; Immigration Enforcement
- Employees: 23,500

Jurisdictional structure
- National agency (Operations jurisdiction): United Kingdom
- Operations jurisdiction: United Kingdom
- Legal jurisdiction: United Kingdom
- Specialist jurisdictions: National border patrol, security, integrity; Customs, excise, gambling

Operational structure
- Headquarters: 2 Marsham Street, London, SW1P 4DF
- Sworn members: 10,000
- Unsworn members: 10,000
- Minister responsible: Kevin Foster, Minister of State for Immigration
- Agency executive: Rob Whiteman, Chief Executive
- Parent agency: Home Office

Facilities
- UKBA 42m Customs Cutters: Five
- Planes: Yes
- Detection dogs: Over 100

Notables
- Programme: To control and police immigration into the United Kingdom

The UK Border Agency (UKBA) was the border control agency of the Government of the United Kingdom and part of the Home Office that was superseded by UK Visas and Immigration, Border Force and Immigration Enforcement in April 2013. It was formed as an executive agency on 1 April 2008 by a merger of the Border and Immigration Agency (BIA), UKvisas and the detection functions of HM Revenue and Customs. The decision to create a single border control organisation was taken following a Cabinet Office report.

The agency's head office was 2 Marsham Street, London. Rob Whiteman became Chief Executive in September 2011. Over 23,000 staff worked for the agency, in over 130 countries. It was divided into four main operations, each under the management of a senior director: operations, immigration and settlement, international operations and visas and law enforcement.

The agency came under formal criticism from the Parliamentary Ombudsman for consistently poor service, a backlog of hundreds of thousands of cases, and a large and increasing number of complaints. In the first nine months of 2009–10, 97% of investigations reported by the Ombudsman resulted in a complaint against the agency being upheld. The complainants were asylum, residence, or other immigration applicants.

In April 2012, the border control division of the UKBA was separated from the rest of the agency as the Border Force. On 26 March 2013, following a scathing report into the agency's incompetence by the Home Affairs Select Committee, it was announced by Home Secretary Theresa May that the UK Border Agency would be abolished and its work returned to the Home Office. Its executive agency status was removed as of 31 March 2013 and the agency was split into three new organisations; UK Visas and Immigration focusing on the visa system, Immigration Enforcement focusing on immigration law enforcement and Border Force providing immigration and customs law enforcement at ports of entry in the UK.

== Role ==
The agency attained full agency status on 1 April 2009. Immigration Officers and Customs Officers retained their own powers for the enforcement and administration of the UK's borders, although management of the new organisation was integrated and progressively officers were cross trained and empowered to deal with customs and immigration matters at the border. The Borders, Citizenship and Immigration Act 2009 received Royal Assent on 21 July 2009. This allowed the concurrent exercise of customs powers by HMRC Commissioners and the Director of Border Revenue; it was the first step in overhauling immigration and customs legislation.

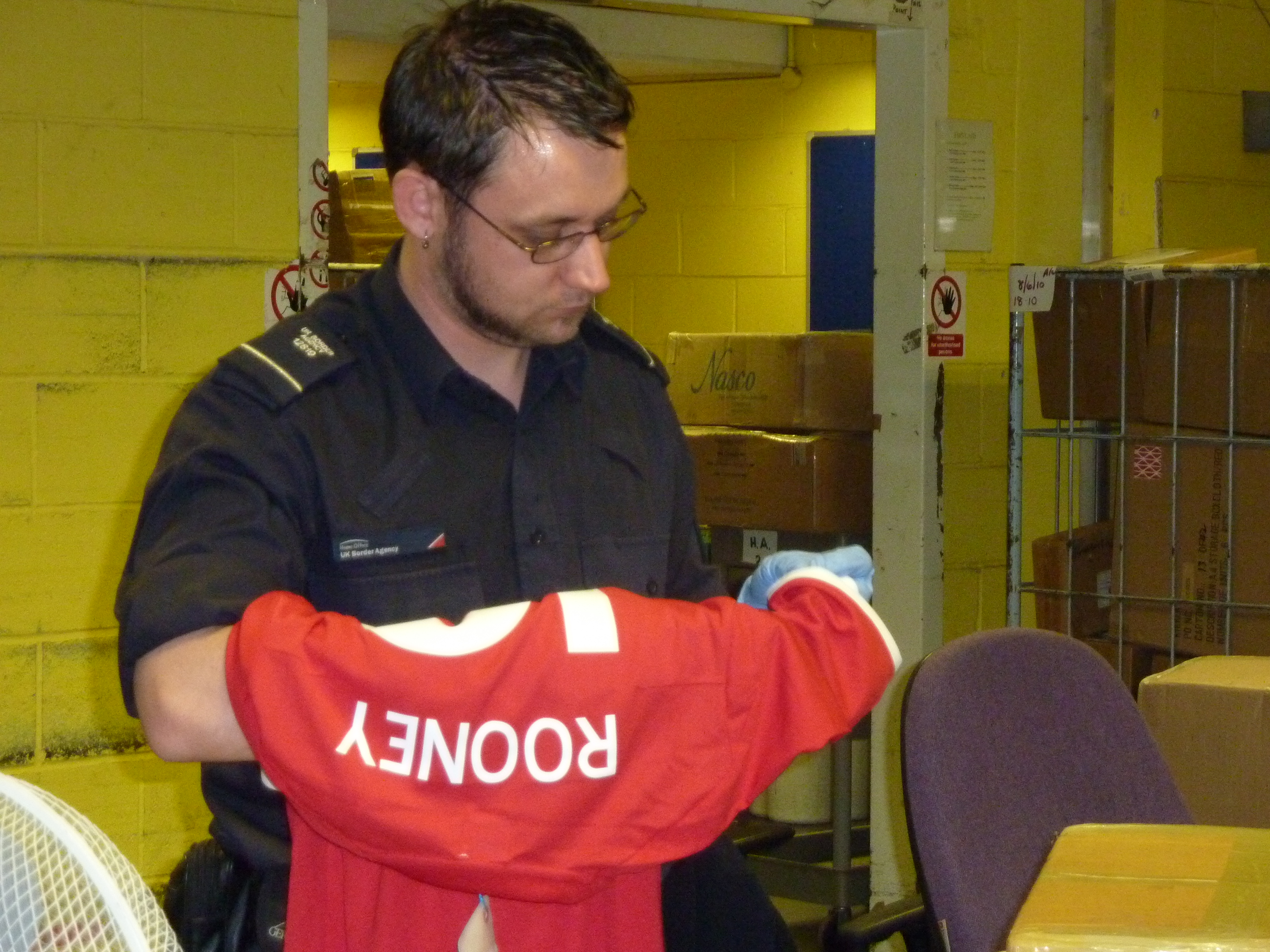
A UK Border Agency officer examines counterfeit football shirts upon their arrival in the United Kingdom

The UK Border Agency had a staff of 23,500 people located in over 130 countries. Overseas staff vetted visa applications and operated an intelligence and liaison network, acting as the first layer of border control for the UK. The organisation operated as the single force at the border for the UK. Local immigration teams worked within the regions of the United Kingdom, liaising with the police, HMRC, local authorities and the public. In August 2009 HM Revenue and Customs transferred several thousand customs detection officers to the agency, following Parliament agreeing to give it customs control powers. The agency then began to investigate smuggling. The agency was developing a single primary border control line at the UK border combining controls of people and goods entering the country.

The agency's E-Borders programme checked travellers to and from the UK in advance of travel, using data provided by passengers via their airline or ferry operators. The organisation used automatic clearance gates at main international airports.

The agency managed the UK Government's limit on non-European economic migration to the UK. It was responsible for in-country enforcement operations, investigating organised immigration crime and to detecting immigration offenders including illegal entrants and overstayers. The body was also responsible for the deportation of foreign national criminals at the end of sentences.

The UK Border Agency's budget combined with that of the Border Force was £2.17 billion in 2011–12. Under the spending review the agency was required to cut costs by up to 23%. At its peak the agency employed around 25,000 staff, but 5,000 posts were due to be cut by 2015 against the 2011–12 levels.

Founding Chief Executive Lin Homer left the agency in January 2011 to become the Permanent Secretary at the Department for Transport. Deputy Chief Executive Jonathan Sedgwick was acting chief until the new CEO, Rob Whiteman, took over on 26 September 2011. Sedgwick then became director of international operations and visas. In July 2011, the strategic policy functions of the agency moved to the Home Office.

Home Secretary Theresa May announced to Parliament on 26 March 2013 that the agency would be abolished due to continuing poor performance, and replaced by two new smaller organisations which would focus on the visa system and immigration law enforcement respectively. The UKBA's performance was described as "not good enough", partly blamed on the size of the organisation. A report by MPs also criticised the agency, and described it as "not fit for purpose". It was also claimed that the agency had provided inaccurate reports to the Home Affairs Select Committee over a number of years. The agency was split internally on 1 April 2013, becoming a visa and immigration service and separate immigration law enforcement service.

== Powers ==
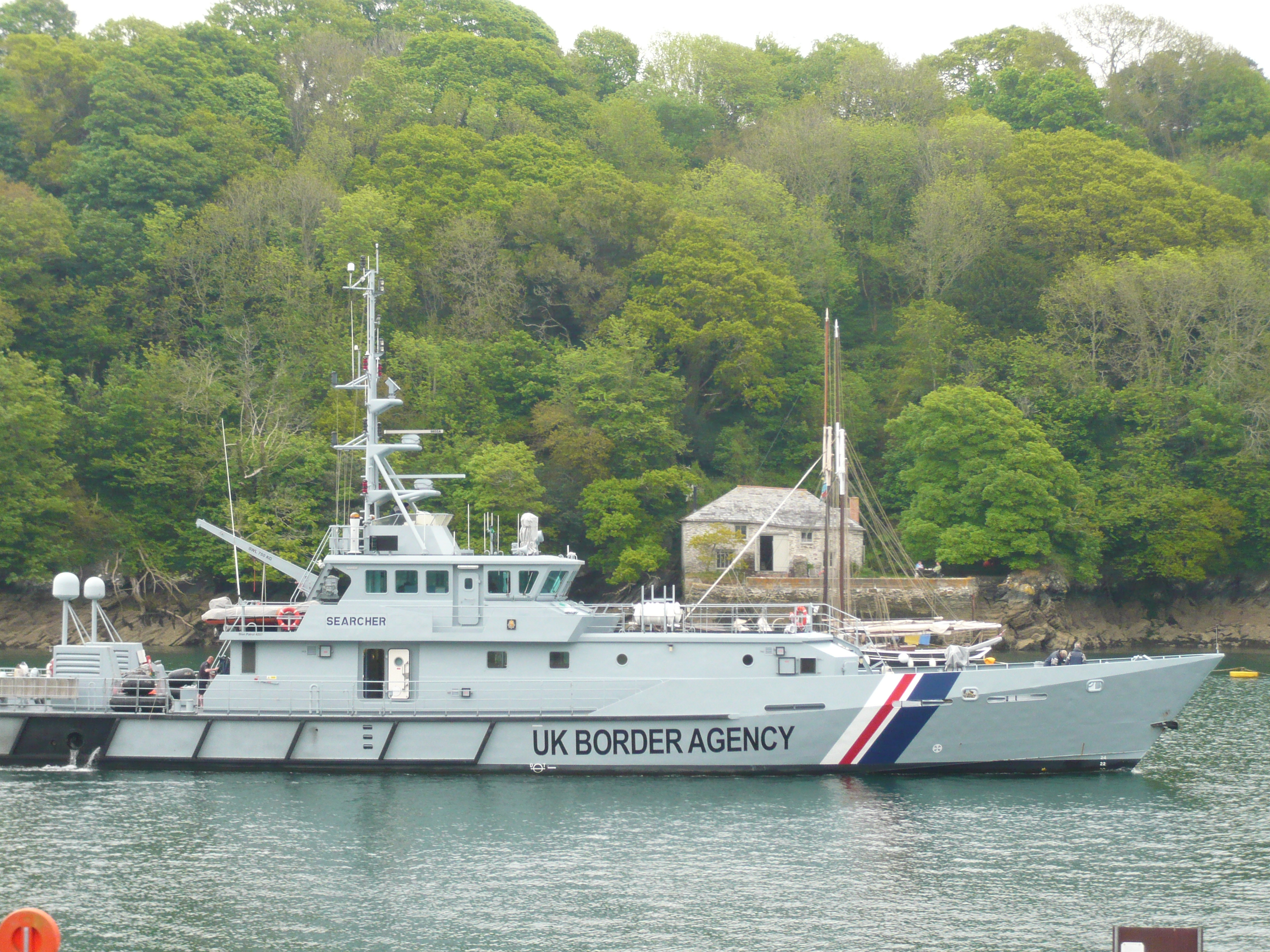
UKBA Cutters, such as HMC Searcher, are capable of top speeds of 26 knots

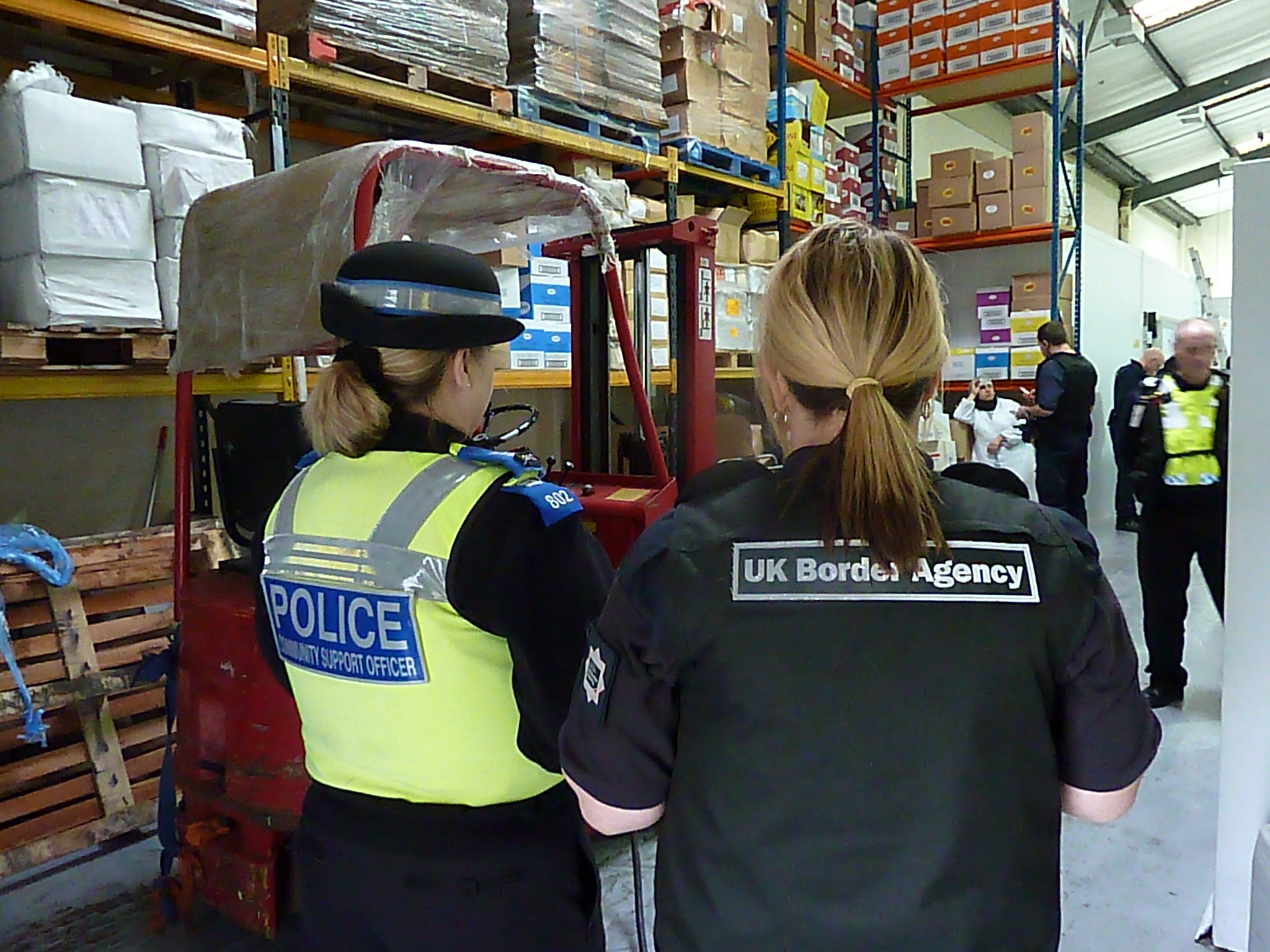
The UKBA often cooperated with the Police, such as at this customs raid. The officer on the left is a Police Community Support Officer (PCSO)

Staff held a mixture of powers granted to them by their status as immigration officers and customs officers.

=== Immigration powers ===
Immigration officers had the power of arrest and detention conferred on them by the Immigration Act 1971, when both at ports and inland. In practice, border force officers exercised powers under Schedule 2 of the Immigration Act 1971 and inland immigration officers under S28A-H of the Immigration Act 1971 and paragraph 17 of Schedule 2. This led to separate training for border and inland officers.

This act is applicable in England, Wales and Northern Ireland. "Designated Immigration Officers" are port immigration officers who have been trained in detention under PACE. UK Border Agency immigration officers wear a uniform with rank insignia. Enforcement immigration officers wear body armour and carry handcuffs and ASP batons.

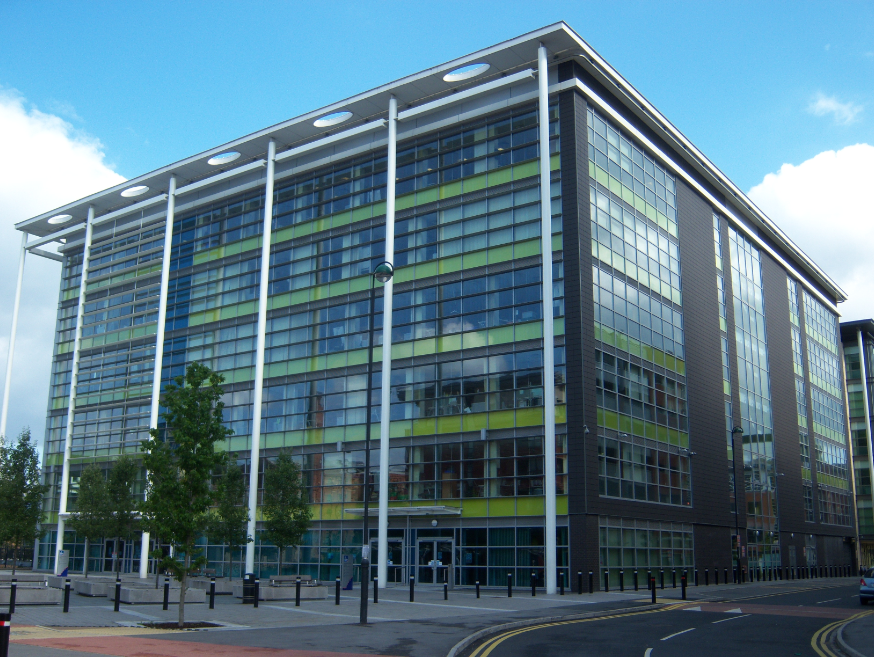
Offices of the UK Border Agency in Sheffield

=== Customs powers ===
Customs officers had wide-ranging powers of entry, search and detention. The main power was to detain anyone who had committed, or who the officer had reasonable grounds to suspect had committed, any offence under the Customs and Excise Acts.

=== Removal of foreign nationals ===
The UK Border Agency occasionally removed foreign national criminals at the end of their prison terms. Over 5000 foreign national prisoners were deported each year. The agency also removed failed asylum seekers and others illegally in the UK. A 2009 report by the National Audit Office cited lack of detention space to support the asylum process. The agency had over 3000 detention spaces in removal centres run by private contractors or the Prison Service.

== Immigration control ==
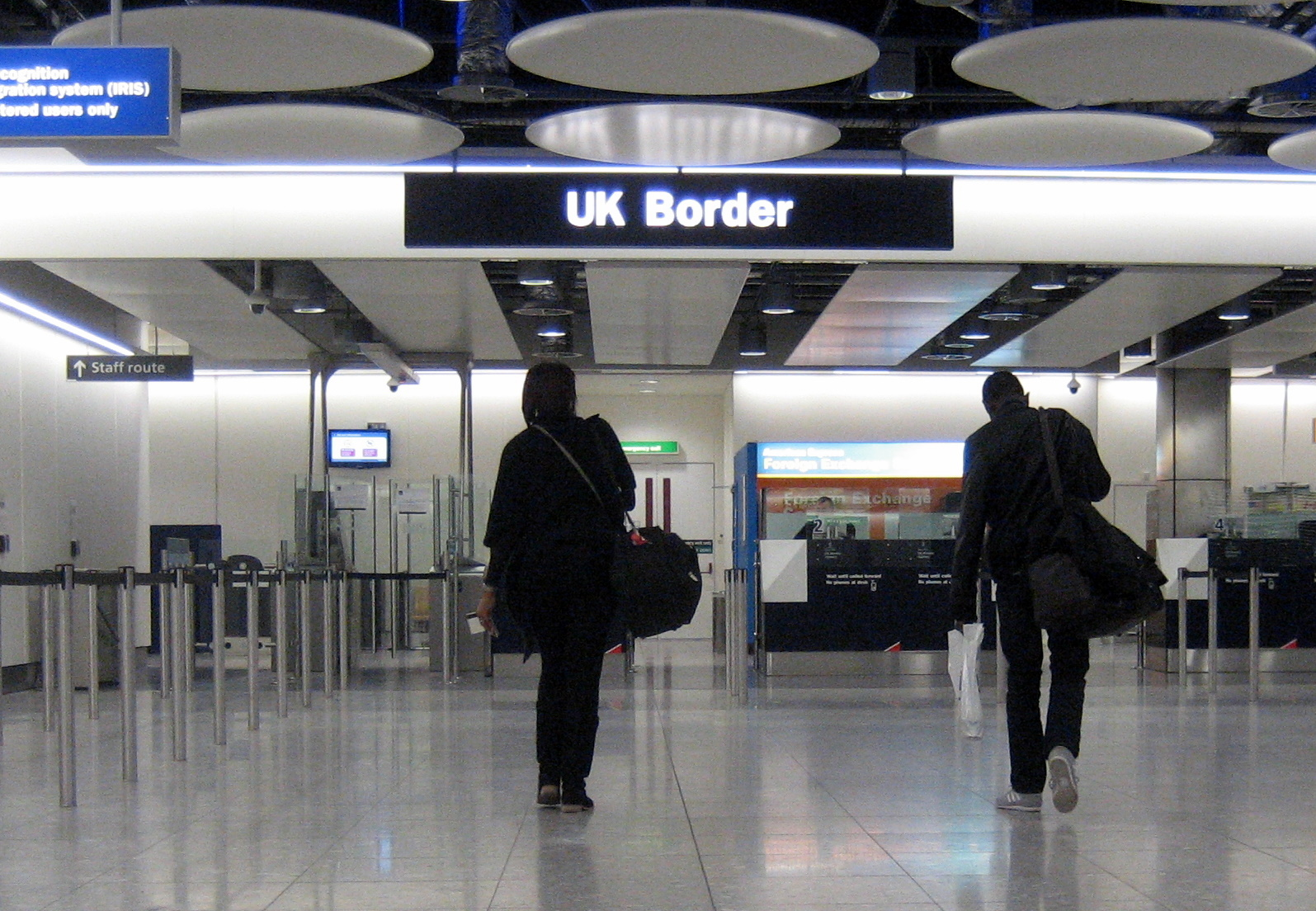
UKBA officers staff the UK border at London Heathrow Airport's Terminal 5

=== Common travel area ===
Immigration control within the United Kingdom is managed within a wider Common Travel Area (CTA). The CTA is an intergovernmental agreement that allows freedom of movement within an area that encompasses the UK, Isle of Man, Channel Islands (Guernsey, Jersey, Sark and Alderney) and the Republic of Ireland. Authorised entry to any of the above essentially allows entry to all the others but it is the responsibility of the person entering to ensure that they are properly documented for entry to other parts of the CTA. Despite the CTA it is still possible to be deported from the UK to the Republic of Ireland and vice versa.

=== Juxtaposed controls ===
Entry to the UK via the Channel Tunnel from France or Belgium or by ferry through selected ports in north-east France is controlled by juxtaposed immigration controls in Britain, France, and Belgium, i.e. travellers clear UK passport control in France or Belgium and those travelling to France or Belgium clear French controls while in the UK. Belgium does not maintain controls in the UK as the first Schengen country entered is France. UK Border Agency checkpoints in France were operated at Gare de Calais-Fréthun, Gare de Lille Europe, Gare de Marne-la-Vallée–Chessy, Gare d'Avignon-Centre, Channel Tunnel, Calais ferry terminal, Dunkirk ferry terminal and Gare du Nord station, Paris. A checkpoint operated at Boulogne-sur-Mer until the port closed in August 2010. United States border preclearance is an equivalent system operated by that country's equivalent to the UKBA at some airports outside the US.

== Controversies ==
=== Student visas ===
There have also been difficulties with the management of student visas under Tier 4 of the Points-Based System. The assessment of the Independent Chief Inspector, carried out between July and August 2010, found that there was an inconsistent response towards applications, with some cases given extra time to prepare and others dismissed for minor reasons.

=== Dropped casework ===
In November 2011, the Home Affairs Select Committee issued a report that found that 124,000 deportation cases had been shelved by the UKBA. The report said the cases had been dumped in a "controlled archive", a term used to try to hide the fact from authorities and auditors that it was a list of lost applicants.

=== Border checks ===
Following allegations that staff were told to relax some identity checks, in November 2011 the UK Home Office suspended: Brodie Clark, the Head of the Border Force; Carole Upshall, director of the Border Force South and European Operation; Graham Kyle, director of operations at Heathrow Airport. The Home Office was investigating allegations that Clark had agreed to "open up the borders" at certain times in ways ministers would "not have agreed with". The BBC reported that staff may have been told not to scan biometric passports at certain times, which contain a digital image of the holder's face, which can be used to compare with the printed version and check the passport has not been forged. It is also believed that "warning index checks" at Heathrow and Calais were also suspended, which would have applied strict security checks against official watchlists of terrorists, criminals, and deported illegal immigrants.

After Clark refused the offer to take early retirement, he was suspended and the investigation began. A two-week inquiry led by former Metropolitan Police detective Dave Wood, currently head of the agency's enforcement and crime group, sought to discover to what extent checks were scaled down, and what the security implications might have been. A second investigation, led by former MI6 official Mike Anderson, the Director General of the Home Office's strategy, immigration and international group, sought to investigate wider issues relating to the performance of UKBA regarding racism.

It was then announced on 5 November by Theresa May that an independent inquiry would also be undertaken, led by the Chief Inspector of the UK Border Agency, John Vine. His report was published on 20 February 2012. The Border Force became a separate organisation on 1 March 2012.

=== 2014 Sham Weddings Trial Collapse ===
In October 2014, the trial of the Reverend Nathan Ntege – accused of conducting almost 500 sham marriages at a church in Thornton Heath, South London between 2007 and 2011 – collapsed after it became apparent that evidence had been tampered with, concealed, or even possibly destroyed. As immigration officers were questioned in the witness box of the Inner London Crown Court it became clear that not only had video footage gone missing but that an investigation log had been tampered with. The trial was halted by Judge Nic Madge, who said in court: "I am satisfied that officers at the heart of this prosecution have deliberately concealed important evidence and lied on oath. The bad faith and misconduct started in 2011, when two of the principal defendants were arrested, and has continued throughout the course of this trial. In my judgment, it has tainted the whole case. It has tainted the prosecution against all seven defendants. It is a case in which the prosecution should not be allowed to benefit from the serious misbehaviour of the officer in the case or the disclosure officer". The Reverend Ntege and six other defendants were formally acquitted of all 17 charges, which related to marriages of convenience in order to bypass immigration laws. Channel 4 News later reported that three immigration officers had been suspended and that the Independent Police Complaints Commission (IPCC) would be conducting an investigation. The Crown Prosecution Service (CPS) said that it accepted that the handling of the case had fallen below acceptable standards and that it would conduct a full review. Despite the collapse of the 2014 criminal case, in 2019 a Church of England disciplinary panel removed Ntege from his office and from the priesthood over complaints concerning marriages, their administration, and the improper retention of funds.

== See also ==
- Border Force National Museum
- Asylum shopping
- HM Customs and Excise
- Illegal immigration in the United Kingdom
- Independent Chief Inspector of Borders and Immigration
- List of renewable resources produced and traded by the United Kingdom
- UK Border Force
- UK Immigration Service
