= UK Visas and Immigration =

Agency of the Home Office responsible for the United Kingdom's visa system

Agency overview
- Formed: April 2013
- Preceding agency: UK Border Agency
- Employees: 7,500
- Minister responsible: Jo White MP, Parliamentary Under-Secretary of State for Migration and Citizenship
- Agency executive: Abi Tierney, Director General
- Parent agency: Home Office
- Website: UK Visas and Immigration

UK Visas and Immigration (UKVI) is a division of the Home Office responsible for the United Kingdom's visa system. It was formed in 2013 from the section of the UK Border Agency that had administered the visa system.

== History ==
The then Home Secretary, Theresa May, announced the abolition of the UK Border Agency on 26 March 2013, with the intention that its work would be returned to the Home Office. The agency's executive agency status was removed, and internally it was split, with one division responsible for the visa system and the other for immigration enforcement. May says UKBA had a "closed, secretive, and defensive culture" that contributed to immense backlogs. The intention of the split was to disperse cases more evenly in a way that would provide them with "high-quality decisions". The responsible minister is the Minister of State for Immigration.

Sarah Rapson, the Registrar General for England and Wales, was appointed as interim director general of UK Visas and Immigration. Her position was made permanent on 5 March 2014. Marc Owen, former senior director of national and international operations, is the current director for visas and citizenship.

== Role ==
UKVI operates the UK visa system, managing applications from foreign nationals seeking to visit or work in the UK and also considering applications from businesses and educational institutions seeking to become sponsors for foreign nationals. It also considers applications from foreign nationals seeking protection or British citizenship and manages appeals from those who have been denied visas.

The UKVI's role has widened in the aftermath of Brexit. In January 2021, the UK implemented a new points-based immigration system, and EU, EEA, and Swiss citizens who resided in the UK must have applied to the EU Settlement Scheme to continue living in the UK after the Brexit transition period.

== Locations ==
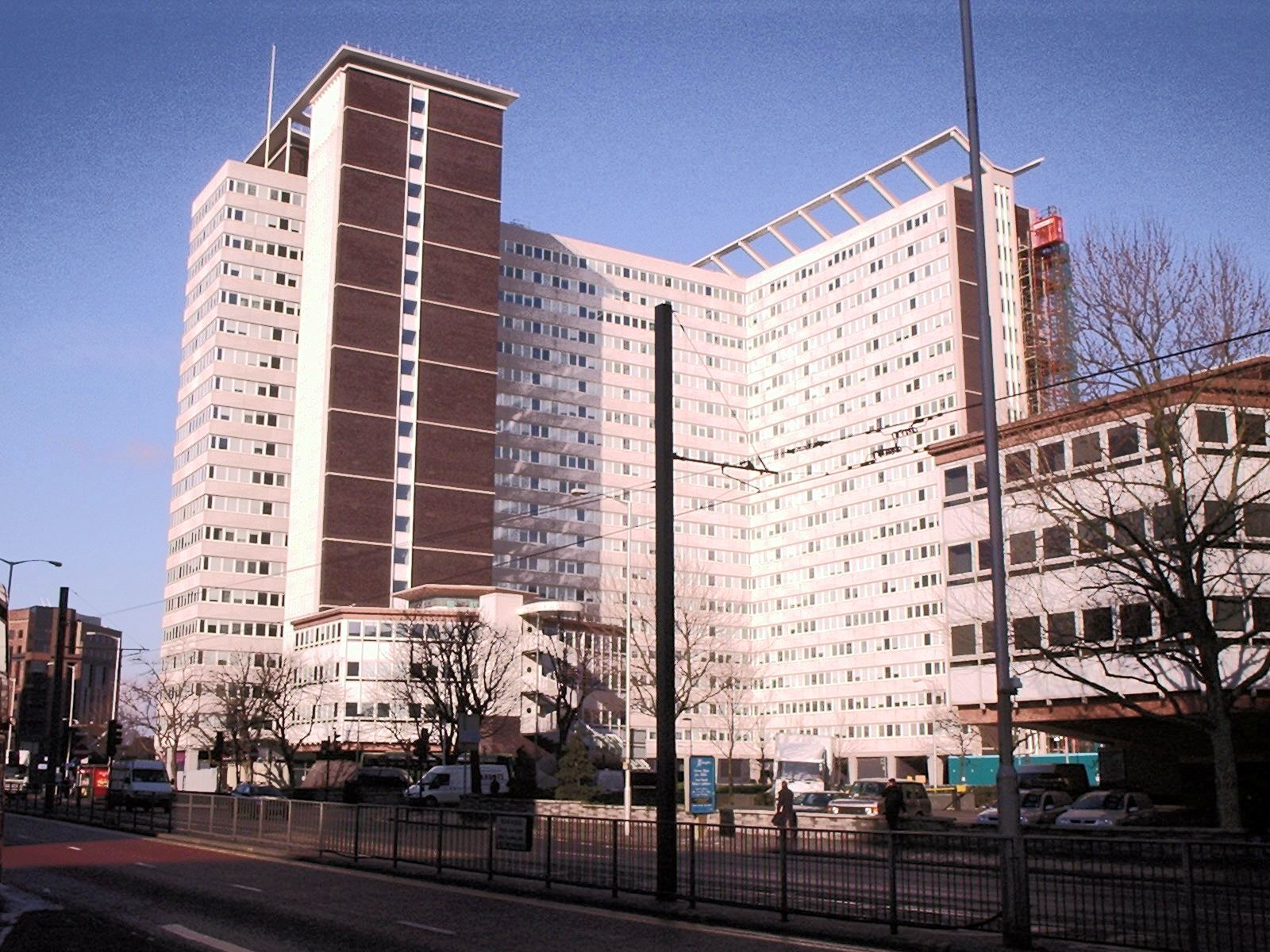
Lunar House in Croydon, which houses the headquarters of UK Visas and Immigration

As of 2017, UKVI is spread over nine buildings across the country. The headquarters of UK Visas and Immigration are in South London in Lunar House. Other immigration offices, such as the Public Enquiry Office, are also there.

- Belfast
- Cardiff
- Croydon, London
- Glasgow
- Leeds
- Liverpool
- Sheffield
- Solihull

== See also ==
- National Border Targeting Centre in south Manchester
- Surinder Singh route
- Windrush scandal (leading to the Windrush Scheme)
