= List of Border Force cutters (UK) =

This List of Border Force cutters is a listing of all cutters to have been commissioned by the Border Force and its predecessors since the amalgamation of HM Customs with the Excise department of the Inland Revenue in the early 20th century. During that time, the cutter service has been overseen successively by:

- HM Customs and Excise; which merged with the Inland Revenue in 2005 to form:
- His Majesty's Revenue and Customs; which in 2008 transferred its frontline customs controls to:
- the UK Border Agency; which in 2012 was split to form Border Force and Immigration Enforcement.

Prior to the formation of HM Customs and Excise in 1909, revenue cruisers of various types were operated in UK waters by various bodies: not only the separately constituted Boards of Customs and Excise, but also the Admiralty and the Coast Guard.

For much of the 20th century, the Cutters were supplemented by a fleet of smaller 'launches'; but these were non-seagoing vessels, restricted to patrolling rivers and estuaries.

In 1980 HMCE's Revenue Cutter Service was renamed the Customs Cutter Service. Thenceforward its vessels bore the ship prefix "HMCC" - His/Her Majesty's Customs Cutter (previously they had long been known as HM Revenue Cutters). Following the flotilla's transfer to the UK Border Agency they were given the prefix "HMC" - His/Her Majesty's Cutter; all current vessels of the UK Border Force bear this prefix.

Currently the Border Force has a fleet of five ocean-going Cutters and six smaller 'Coastal Patrol Vessels' (CPVs). All eleven vessels are due to be replaced, however a schedule for their replacement has not (as of March 2023) been announced. In 2022 it was reported that additional boats and crews had been chartered (for up to six months at a time) from companies linked to the offshore wind industry.

In 2024 it was announced that a “new team” would be set up by the new Labour Government’s Home Office, to tackle smugglers who try to bring illegal substances into the country by sea: “The new Maritime Directorate will work closely with other enforcement agencies to improve intelligence and cooperation with other countries”. In March 2025 The BBC reported a successful operation to disrupt a £58M plot to smuggle cocaine into the UK, the first public announcement attributing success to this new “Directorate” of Border Force.

== Pre-Second World War ==
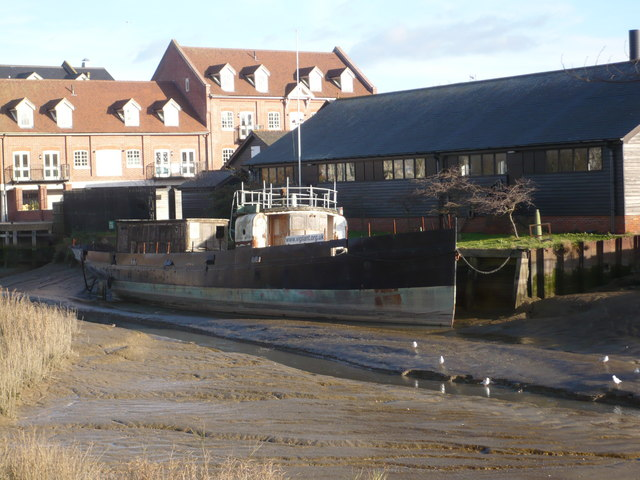
The former Revenue Cutter Vigilant (1902) in 2008, awaiting restoration on Faversham Creek

For the first part of the 20th century HM Customs and Excise made do with a single Customs Cutter:

- Vigilant (1902-1920) built by Cox & Co. of Falmouth
- Vigilant (1919-1928) (formerly HMS Esther)

After 1928 no new Cutter was procured until after the Second World War, HMCE seeking instead to rely on its Launches.

== Post-war ==
- HMRC Vigilant (1946-1962), a former Royal Navy Isles-class trawler
- Valiant (1947-1967), a former Royal Navy Motor Launch
- Vincent (1948-1965), a former Royal Navy Motor Launch

== V-class ==
- Venturous (1962-1980) built to Customs specifications
- Vigilant (1965-1980)
- Valiant (1968-1979)

== Tracker-class ==
- HMCC Active (1976–1988)
- HMCC Alert (1976–1983)
- HMCC Challenge (1977–1989)
- HMCC Champion (1978–1989)
- HMCC Safeguard (1979–1993)
- HMCC Swift (1978–1993)

== Fast patrol vessel ==
- HMCC Searcher (1979-2001)
- HMCC Seeker (1980-2001)

== Protector-class ==
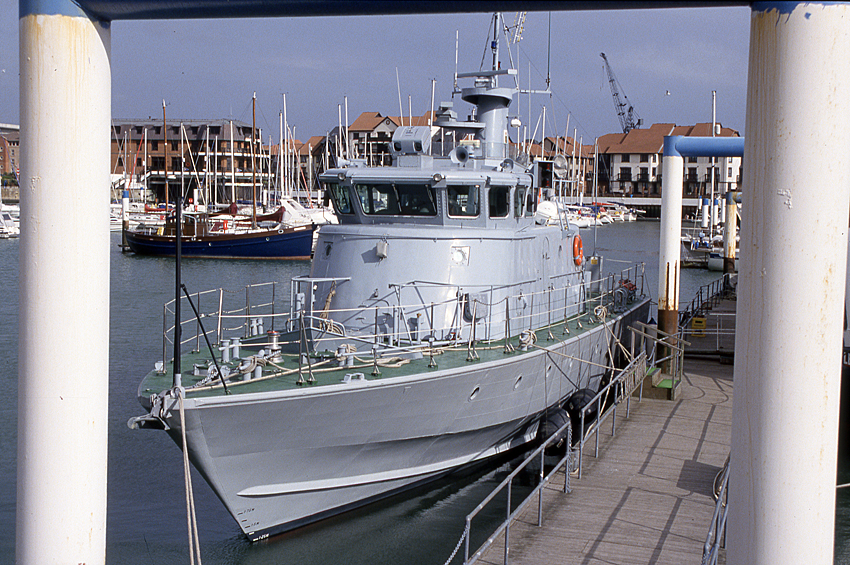
HMCC Valiant in Ocean Village, Southampton

- HMCC Valiant (1988–2003)
- HMCC Vigilant (1989–2003)
- HMCC Venturous (1989–2003)
- HMCC Vincent (1993–2004)

== Island-class ==
- HMC Sentinel (1993–2013)

== UKBF 42m Customs Cutter ==
- HMC Seeker (2001)
- HMC Searcher (2002)
- HMC Vigilant (2003)
- HMC Valiant (2004)

== Telkkä-class ==
- HMC Protector (2014)

== Coastal patrol vessels ==
Note: These smaller vessels are not listed as Cutters by UK Border Force.

- Active (2016)
- Alert (2016)
- Eagle (2016)
- Nimrod (2016)
- Hunter (2018)
- Speedwell (2018)

== 25m Catamaran ==
Note: These chartered vessels are not listed as Cutters by UK Border Force.

- Hurricane (built 2016, previous offshore wind support vessel, transferred to Border Force in 2021)
- Typhoon (built 2016, previous offshore wind support vessel, transferred to Border Force in 2021)
- Ranger (built 2014, previous offshore wind support vessel, transferred to Border Force in 2021)
- Defender (built 2013, previous offshore wind support vessel, transferred to Border Force in 2021)

== Image gallery ==
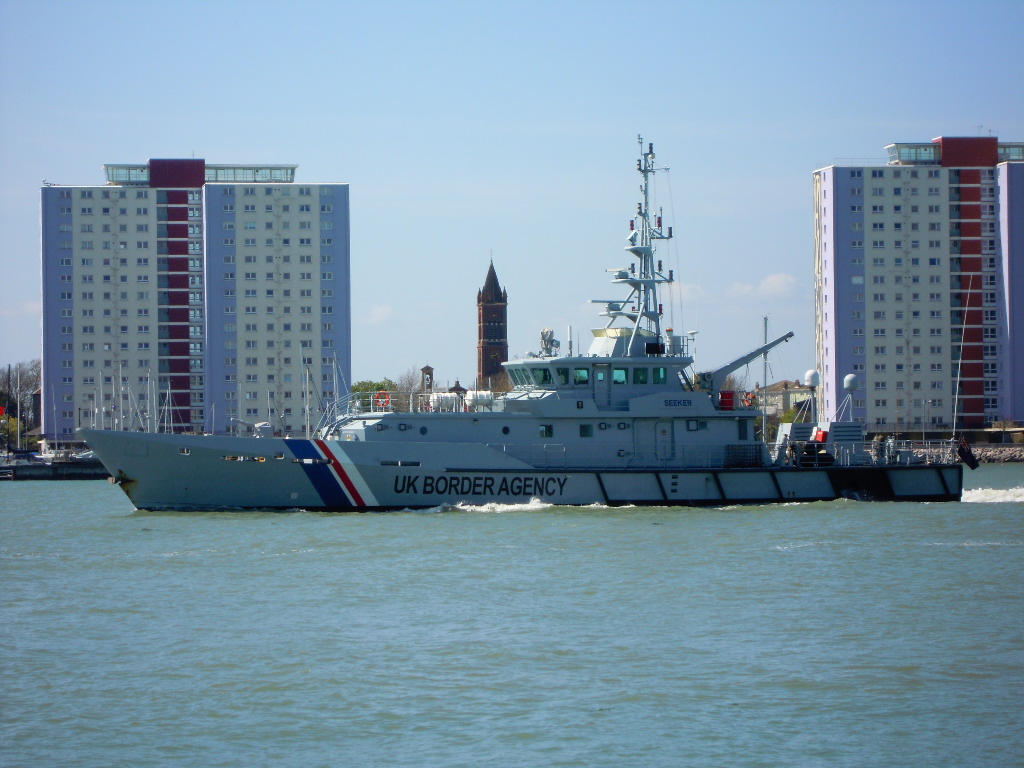
HMC Seeker

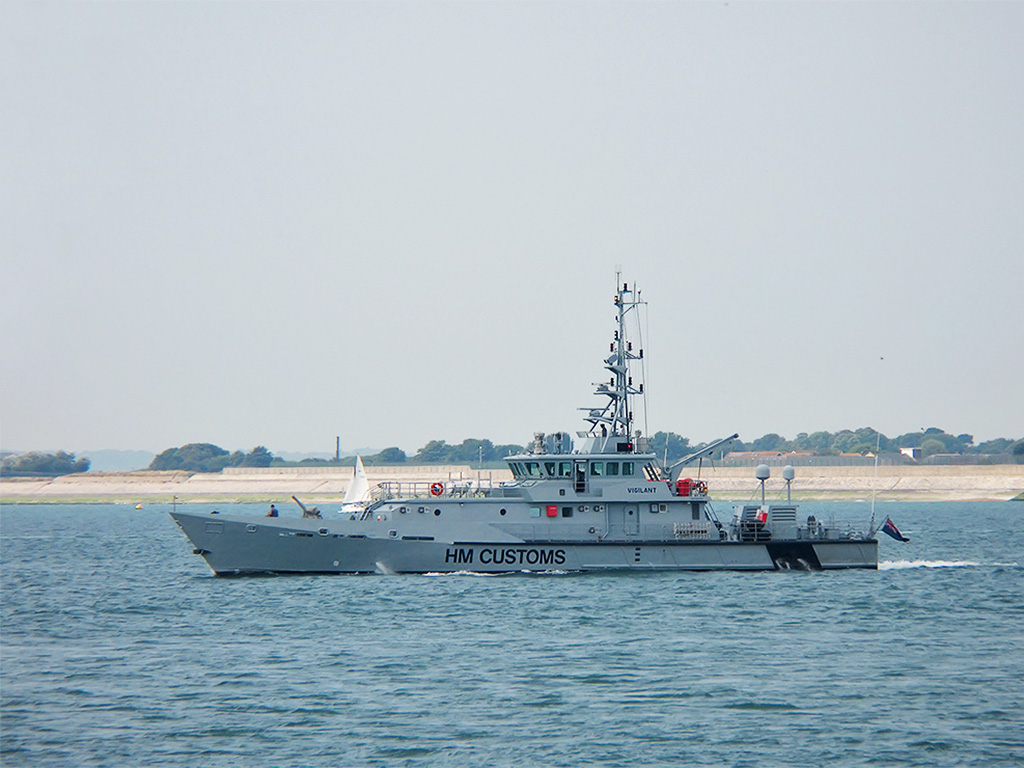
HMC Vigilant

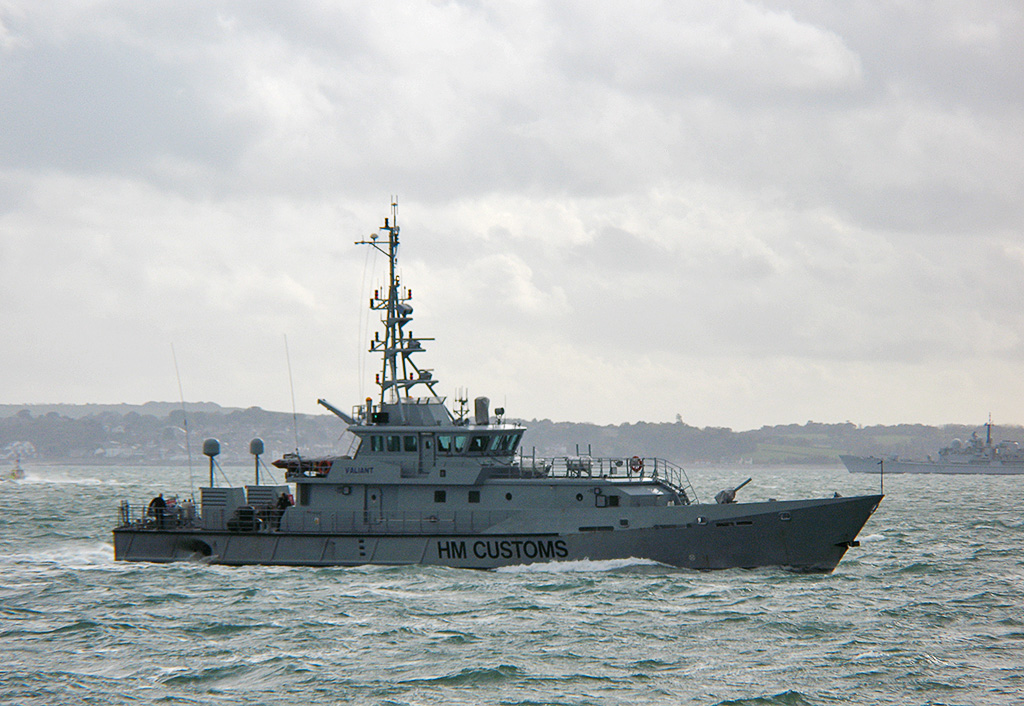
HMC Valiant

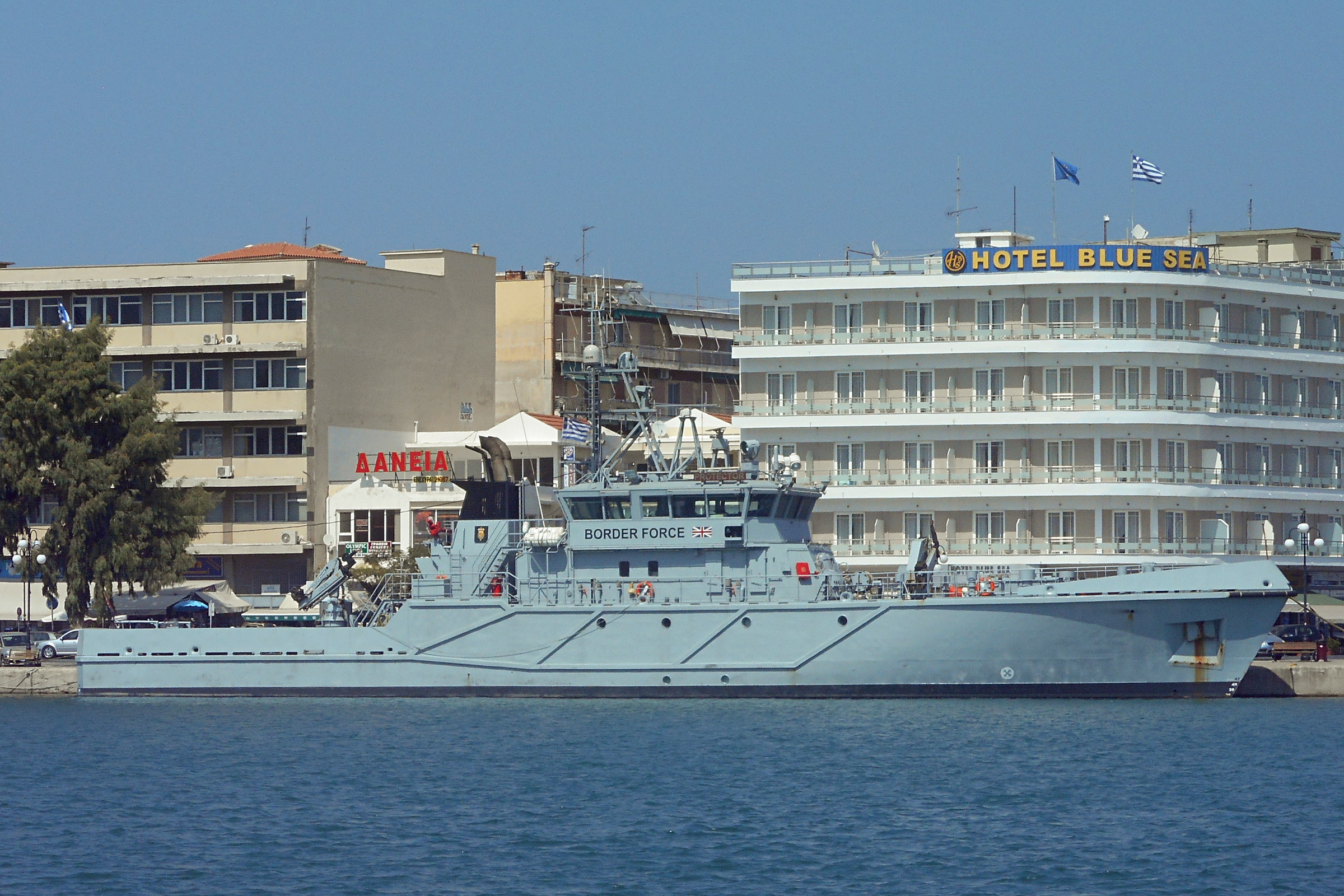
HMC Protector

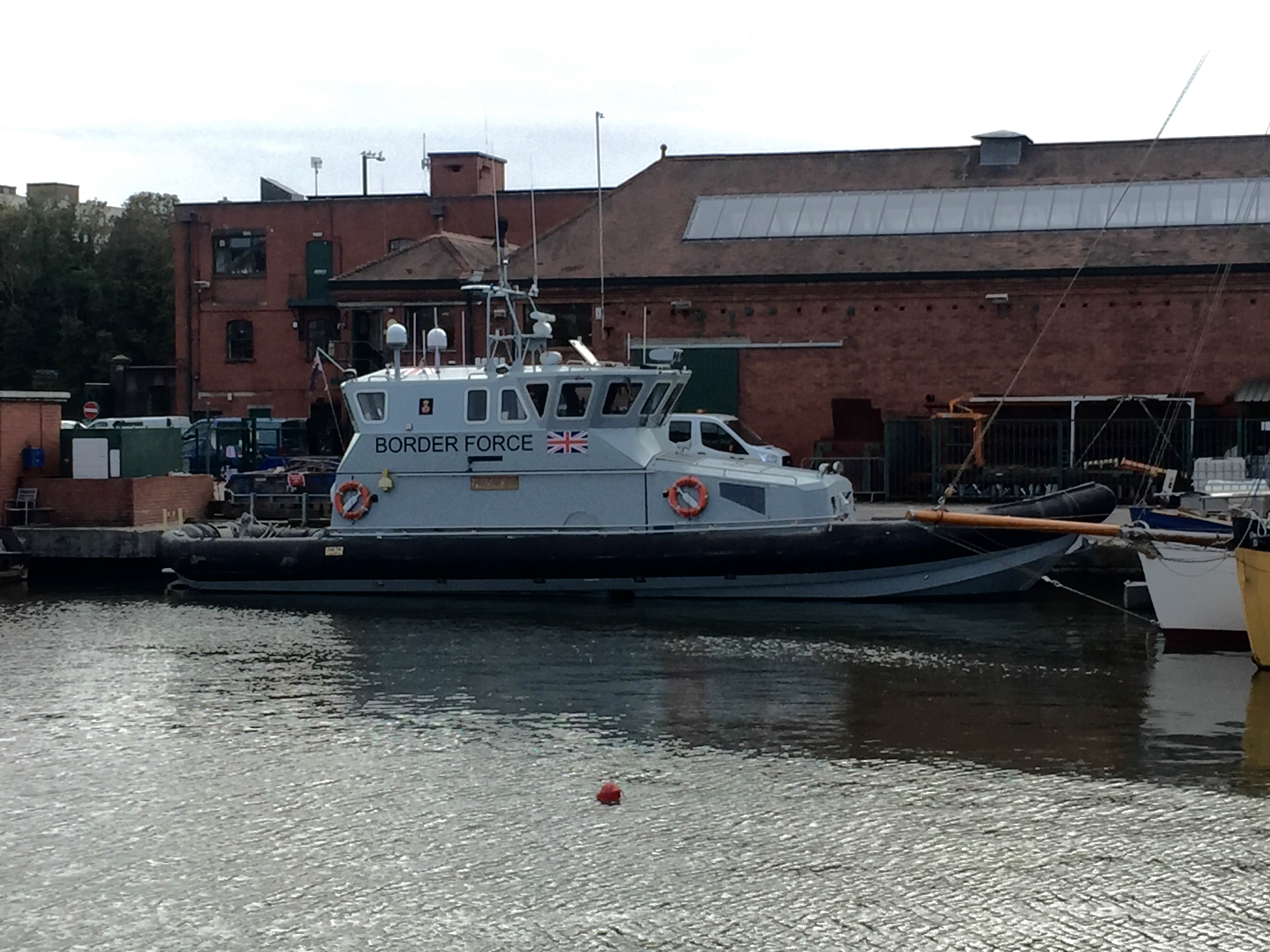
HMC Nimrod
