= Tavi =

Tavi or TAVI may refer to:

== People ==
- Tavi (slave) (c. 1st century), a slave of Gamaliel II who converted to Judaism
- Tavi Castro (born 1990), Mexican-born Canadian bodybuilder
- Tavi Gevinson (born 1996), American writer, magazine editor, actress and singer
- Tavi Murray (born 1965), British glaciologist
- Janne Tavi (born 1989), Finnish professional ice hockey player

== Places ==
- Tavi State, a village in Gujarat, India, and former princely state in Kathiawar
- Tavi, Iran, a village

== Other uses ==
- Tavi, a Finnish border guard ship, later UK HMC Protector
- Transcatheter aortic valve implantation, a medical procedure

== See also ==
- River Tavy, Devon, England
- Tavey, a French commune
- Tavis, surname
- Tawi (disambiguation)
