= Maloi (disambiguation) =

Maloi (born 2002) is a main vocalist of the Filipino girl group Bini.

Maloi may also refer to:

- Maloi, a village in Jacobabad District, Sindh, Pakistan
- Maloi, a clan of Tiwa people
