= Tawi =

Tawi may refer to:

- Tawi River, India
- Tawi (Legislative Assembly constituency), Mizoram, India
- Tawi Sli (1912–1987), second chief minister of Sarawak, Malaysia
- Tawi-Tawi Province, Philippines
  - Tawitawi Island, Philippines

== See also ==
- Tavi (disambiguation)
- Tiwi (disambiguation)
- Tiwa (disambiguation)
