= Towa =

Towa may refer to:

== Japanese municipalities ==
- Tōwa, Fukushima, a town in Fukushima Prefecture
- Tōwa, Iwate, a town in Iwate Prefecture
- Tōwa, Kōchi, a village in Kōchi Prefecture
- Tōwa, Yamaguchi, a former town in Yamaguchi Prefecture
- Tōwa, Miyagi, which merged with eight other towns on April 1, 2005 to form Tome, Miyagi

== Linguistics ==
- Towa language, a Native American language spoken by the Jemez Pueblo people
- Towa Sanyo, a 17th-century textbook for teaching the Chinese language to Japanese speakers

== People ==
- Towa Bird (born 1999), British singer-songwriter
- Towa Carson (born 1936), Swedish schlager singer
- Tōwa Tei (born 1964), Japanese DJ, artist and record producer
- Richard Towa (born 1969), Cameroonian former football player and now assistant coach
- Towa Oshima (born 1979), Japanese manga artist best known for High School Girls
- Towa Yamane (山根 永遠; born 1999), Japanese footballer
- Towa Iwasaki (岩崎 永遠; born 1998), Japanese professional wrestler
- Marcien Towa (1931 – 2014), Cameroonian philosopher
- Tokoyami Towa (常闇トワ), a Japanese VTuber

== Characters ==
- Towa Kannagi, a white-haired woman who was granted longevity and slight eternal youth by drinking the blood of a mermaid which as given to her by her identical twin sister Sawa in Mermaid Forest.
- Towa Higurashi, the adopted daughter of Sōta, the elder twin daughter of Sesshomaru and Rin, and twin sister of Setsuna. She is the main character of the Inuyasha sequel anime television series Yashahime.
- Mary Towa, operators of Ring.EXE from MegaMan Battle Chip Challenge
- Towa, nickname To-to/Eternal Mark from manga D.N.Angel
- Towa, the main antagonist in Dragon Ball Online and secondary antagonist in the Dragon Ball Xenoverse
- Towa, a Anbu members in Naruto: Clash of Ninja Revolution 2
- Princess Hope Delight Towa (Akagi Towa) From Go! Princess PreCure
- Haiji Towa and Monaca Towa from Danganronpa Another Episode: Ultra Despair Girls
- Towa Kokonoe, a teacher from Tokyo Xanadu
- Kagami of Towa, female samurai from Emerson champaign (D&D)
- Towa Herschel from The Legend of Heroes: Trails of Cold Steel tetralogy
- Towa from Darwin's Game
- Towa, an assassin from Log Horizon
- Towa, pilot & mechanic from Metal Slug Attack
- Towa from Evenicle (AliceSoft)
- Towa, flight attendant from Eden no Ori
- Erio Tōwa, a student and main heroine from Denpa Onna to Seishun Otoko
- Towa, protagonist from 2015 android/iOS game Kemono Friends
- Towa Yuhazaki from Crimson Alive: Genesis of the Heretic
- Towa, a grandmother of Diana from Pokémon 4Ever - Celebi: The Voice of the Forest
- Towa Honda from Konbini Kareshi
- Towa Miduchi from Towa no Quon
- Towa Otonashi (音無 叶空), a character from the supernatural mobile game Tokyo Debunker
