= Tivi (disambiguation) =

Tivi is a village and municipality in the Ordubad Rayon of Nakhchivan, Azerbaijan.

Tivi may also refer to:

- Tiv people or Tivi, an ethnic nation in West Africa
- Tivi (magazine), a Finnish computer magazine published by Alma Media

== People with the given name ==
- Tivi Etok, a Canadian Inuk artist

== See also ==
- TV
- Tiwi (disambiguation)
