= Charles Montgomery (Royal Navy officer) =

Royal Navy officer (born 1955)

Vice Admiral Sir Charles Montgomery KBE ADC
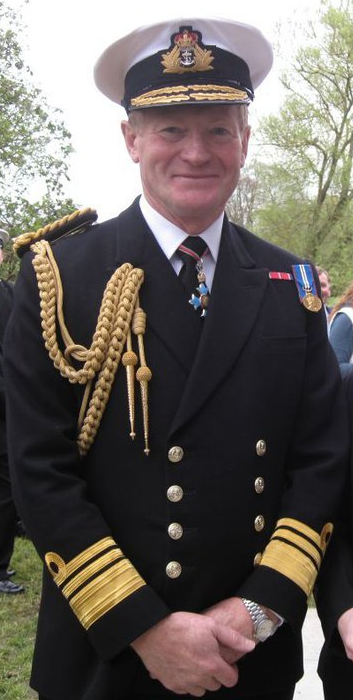
- Charles Montgomery in 2011

Director General of Border Force
- In office 25 January 2013 – 25 June 2017
- Prime Minister: David Cameron; Theresa May
- Preceded by: Tony Smith
- Succeeded by: Paul Lincoln

Personal details
- Born: 12 April 1955 (age 70) Rotherham, South Yorkshire, England

Military service
- Allegiance: United Kingdom
- Branch/service: Royal Navy
- Years of service: 1973–2013
- Rank: Vice Admiral
- Commands: Second Sea Lord; HMS Beaver
- Awards: Knight Commander of the Order of the British Empire

Vice Admiral Sir Charles Percival Ross Montgomery, KBE, ADC (born 12 April 1955) is a retired Royal Navy officer who served as Second Sea Lord from 2010 to 2012. He then served as Director General of the Border Force from 2013 to 2017.

== Early life ==
Montgomery was born in 1955. He was educated at Uppingham School and the Royal Naval College, Dartmouth. He attended Sheffield University, graduating in 1976 with a degree in Electronic and Electrical Engineering.

== Military career ==
Montgomery joined the Royal Navy in 1973. After spending his first three years of service at university, he went to sea and rose through the officer ranks to become Commander of HMS Beaver. Later he became Training Director of the Naval Recruiting and Training Agency and then Private Secretary to the Secretary of State for Defence.

He went on to become Director of Naval Personnel Strategy in 2005, Naval Secretary in 2007 and Second Sea Lord in 2010. He stepped down as Second Sea Lord on 10 October 2012.

Montgomery was appointed a Commander of the Order of the British Empire (CBE) in the 2006 Birthday Honours and advanced to Knight Commander of the Order of the British Empire (KBE) in the 2012 Birthday Honours.

== Later life ==
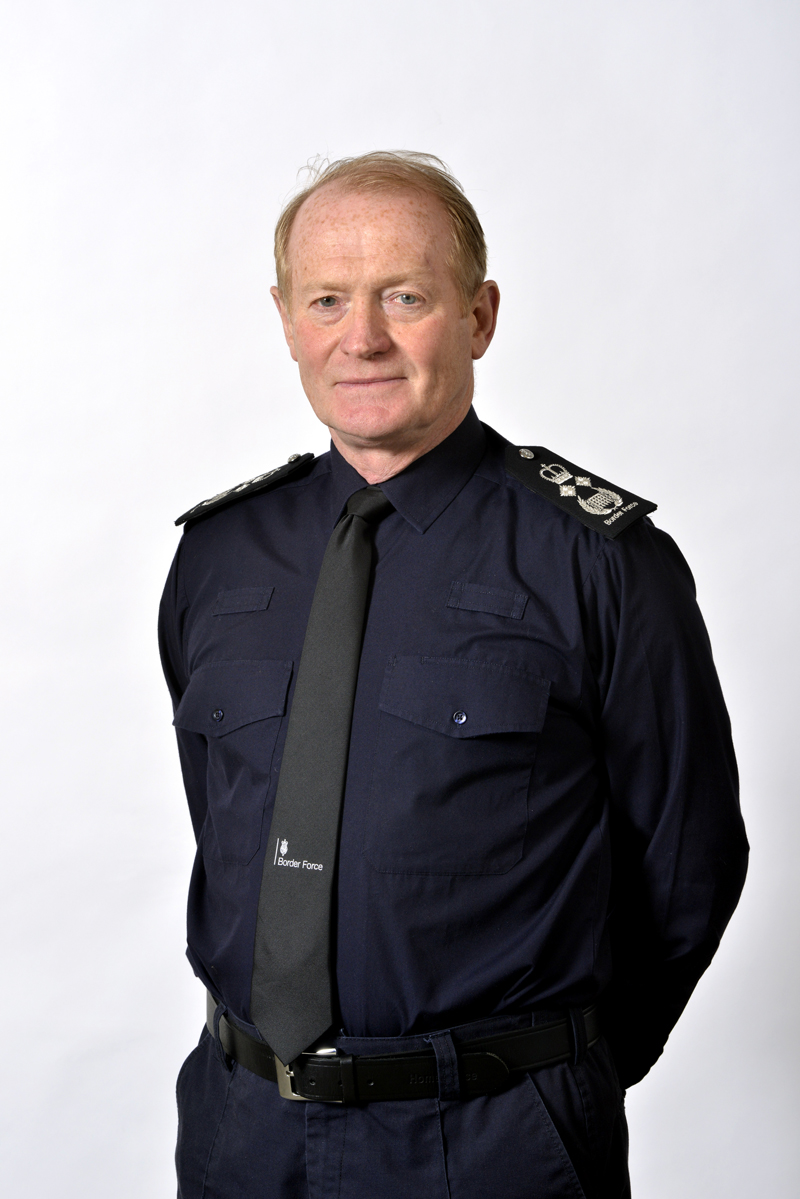
In uniform as Director General of the Border Force

On 25 January 2013 the Home Office announced that Montgomery had been appointed Director General of the Border Force. Montgomery joined Border Force as Director General in March 2013. He wore the Border Force uniform with the rank insignia of Director General.

== Personal life ==
In 1982, Montgomery married Adrienne Julie. Together they have four children: three sons and one daughter.

Montgomery became an honorary Doctor of Engineering from the University of Sheffield (12 January 2012).

Military offices
Preceded by Richard Ibbotson	Naval Secretary; 2007–2010	Succeeded by David Steel
Preceded by Sir Alan Massey	Second Sea Lord; 2010–2012	Succeeded by David Steel
