= Tiwi =

Tiwi can refer to:

- Tiwi, Albay, a municipality in the province of Albay, Philippines
- Tiwi, Kenya, a settlement in Kenya's Coast Province
- Tiwi, Oman, an archaeological site
- Tiwi, Northern Territory, a suburb of Darwin in Australia
- The Tiwi Islands, 80 km (50 mi) north of Darwin
  - The Tiwi people, the inhabitants of the Tiwi Islands
  - The Tiwi language, spoken by the Tiwi people

== See also ==
- Tawi (disambiguation)
- Tivi (disambiguation)
