= Tiwa =

Tiwa and Tiwa Indian may refer to:

- Tiwa people (Americas), also known as Tigua, an ethnic group in New Mexico and Texas in the Southwestern United States
  - Tiwa language (Americas), or Tigua language, a Tanoan language with multiple dialects in the United States
- Tiwa people (Asia), an ethnic group of north-eastern India, Bangladesh, and Myanmar
  - Tiwa language (India), a Sino-Tibetan language of India

== List of Tiwa Pueblos ==
- Isleta Pueblo
- Picuris Pueblo
- Sandia Pueblo
- Taos Pueblo
- Ysleta del Sur Pueblo, also known as Tigua Pueblo

== List of people named Tiwa ==
- Malakai Tiwa (born 1986), Fijian footballer
- Monty Tiwa (born 1976), Indonesian film director and screenwriter
- Tiwa Savage (born 1980), Nigerian singer

== See also ==
- Tewa
- Towa
- Tiguex (disambiguation)
