= HMC Protector =

UK Border Force Telkkä-class Customs Cutter

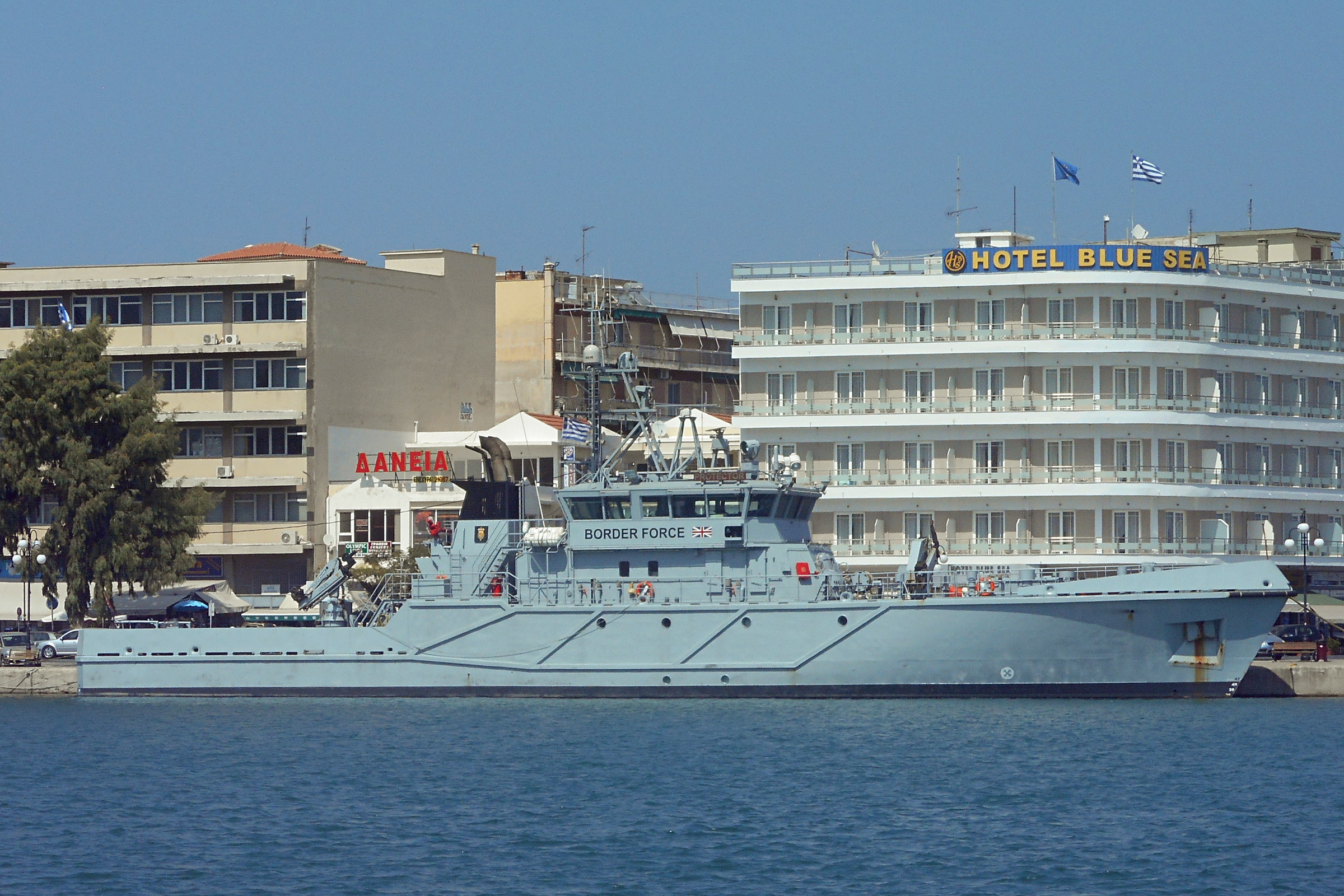
- HMC Protector in Mytilene port, Greece

History

Finland
- Name: Tavi
- Operator: 2002–2013: Finnish Border Guard
- Ordered: January 2000
- Builder: Uudenkaupungin Työvene Oy, Uusikaupunki, Finland
- Yard number: 20125
- Launched: January 2002
- Identification: IMO number: 4544107; Call sign: 2GWY9; MMSI number: 235101211
- Fate: Sold to UK Border Force in August 2013

United Kingdom
- Name: Protector
- Operator: 2013–present: UK Border Force
- Acquired: August 2013
- Commissioned: 17 March 2014
- Status: In service

General characteristics
- Class & type: Telkkä-class Customs Cutter
- Tonnage: 423 GT; 127 NT
- Displacement: 434 t (427 long tons; 478 short tons)
- Length: 49.7 m (163 ft)
- Beam: 7.3 m (24 ft)
- Draught: 3.65 m (12.0 ft)
- Installed power: 5,000 kW (6,700 hp)
- Propulsion: Two Wärtsilä 12V200 engines; Two reduction gearboxes; One bow thruster
- Speed: 22 knots (41 km/h)
- Armament: None

HMC Protector is a Border Force (customs) cutter of the United Kingdom, formerly the Tavi of the Finnish Border Guard. She was built by Uki Workboat in Finland and was acquired by the UK Border Force in 2013. After a period of refit, the vessel was commissioned by the then Home Secretary Theresa May on 17 March 2014. Protector replaced HMC Sentinel, which was retired in 2013.

== Construction ==
HMC Protector is the only vessel of the Telkkä-class operating in the UK Border Force's fleet and works alongside four 42-metre (138 ft) customs patrol vessels. Protector was built in 2002 by Uudenkaupungin Työvene Oy at Uusikaupunki, Finland and named Tavi, originally serving with the Finnish Border Guard. The design includes an ice-class steel hull and an aluminium superstructure. After service with the Finnish Border Guard from 2002 to 2013, Tavi was sold to the UK Border Force. Following a period of refit, the vessel was renamed Protector and entered service on 17 March 2014 with a commissioning ceremony in London. The home port of the Protector is Portsmouth.

== Propulsion ==
Protector is fitted with twin Wärtsilä 12V200 engines driving twin propellers through a pair of reduction gearboxes. The total installed power of 5,000 kW (6,700 hp) gives Protector a top speed of 22 knots (41 km/h). A single bow thruster is fitted for manoeuvring.

== Operational history ==
From April to October 2015, HMC Protector was located in the Mediterranean as part of Operation Triton alongside HMC Seeker. The two ships were responsible for rescuing 1,650 refugees and apprehended 26 people traffickers. Both vessels operated alongside the Italian Armed Forces and had a small contingent of Royal Marines aboard.

On 28 August 2019 she was involved in the seizure of approximately 750 kg of 80% purity cocaine off the coast of Pembrokeshire. The vessel was then landed in Fishguard harbour.
