= MV VOS Grace =

Supply vessel

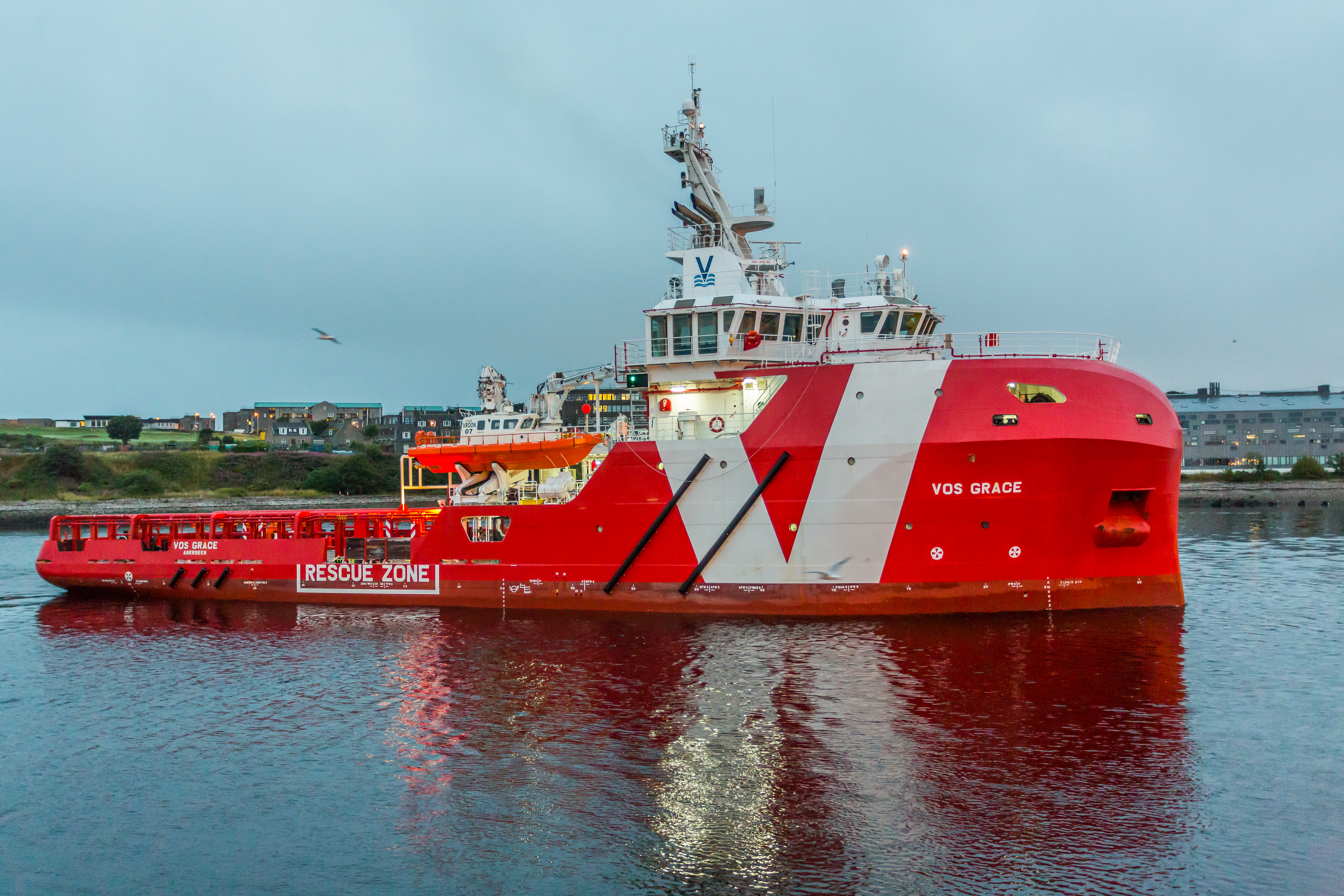
- The MV VOS Grace

History

United Kingdom
- Name: VOS Grace
- Operator: 2015–present: Vroon Offshore
- Port of registry: Aberdeen, United Kingdom (2015–present)
- Builder: Fujian Southeast Shipyard, Fuzhou, China
- Launched: 2015
- Commissioned: 04 June 2015
- Identification: IMO number: 9680542; Call sign: 2HEO2; MMSI number: 235103026
- Status: In service

General characteristics
- Class & type: Platform supply vessel
- Tonnage: 1,969 GT; 590 NT; 1,406 DWT
- Length: 60 m (196 ft 10 in)
- Beam: 15 m (49 ft 3 in)
- Draught: 5.014 m (16 ft 5.4 in)
- Installed power: 2,800 kW (3,800 hp)
- Propulsion: Two Caterpillar engines; Two reduction gearboxes; Two controllable pitch propellers; Three thrusters (retractable azimuth, bow thruster and stern thruster)
- Speed: 14 knots (26 km/h)
- Complement: 23 crew; 66 passengers

MV VOS Grace is a platform supply vessel registered in the United Kingdom and operated by Vroon Offshore. Built in Fujian province, China, the VOS Grace was chartered by the UK government to assist the Royal Fleet Auxiliary and Border Force in 2016 with operations intercepting migrants crossing the Aegean Sea during the European migrant crisis. The ship operated alongside RFA Mounts Bay of the Royal Fleet Auxiliary and the two Border Force cutters.

== Construction ==
Owned by Vroon Offshore, the VOS Grace is a platform supply vessel of steel construction and classed with the American Bureau of Shipping. The ship was built at the Fujian Southeast Shipyard in the city of Fuzhou, China, and was completed on 4 June 2015.

== Propulsion ==
VOS Grace is powered by twin Caterpillar diesel engines with a total output of 2,800 kW (3,800 hp) giving a maximum speed of 14 knots (26 km/h; 16 mph). Propulsion is given by two variable pitch propellers The ship also has three thrusters to allow for manoeuvring at slow speed: one forward, one aft and one retractable azimuth thruster.

== Operational history ==
To support the United Kingdom's contribution to Frontex search and rescue missions in 2016, VOS Grace was chartered by the UK government to provide assistance to RFA Mounts Bay and two UK Border Force cutters assisting with intercepting migrants crossing the Aegean Sea. A small contingent of Royal Marines was stationed on board the VOS Grace during this period. The ships were operating under the command of a German-led NATO force. The task force operated between the coast of Turkey and a number of Greek islands including Lesbos. The task force assisted with recovering migrants who were in distress and also with tracking and reporting smugglers' boats to Turkish authorities. During its time in the Aegean Sea, the VOS Grace was reported to have picked up 6,017 migrants attempting to make the journey from Libya.
