= HMC Active =

UK Border Force Coastal Patrol Vessel

History

Cayman Islands
- Name: David
- Owner: BP
- Ordered: 1 March 2004
- Builder: Holyhead Marine, Holyhead; Delta ARRC Ltd, Stockport
- Laid down: 8 January 2005
- In service: 10 December 2006
- Out of service: 2016
- Identification: IMO number: 9335616; Call sign: 2JQQ3; MMSI number: 235118132
- Fate: Sold to UK Border Force

United Kingdom
- Owner: UK Border Force
- Acquired: October 2016
- Renamed: Active
- Status: In service

General characteristics
- Class & type: Coastal Patrol Vessel
- Tonnage: 29 GT; 31 DWT
- Length: 17.75 m (58.2 ft)
- Beam: 5.63 m (18.5 ft)
- Draught: 0.9 m (3.0 ft)
- Installed power: 1,288 kW (1,727 hp)
- Propulsion: Two Caterpillar C18 main engines; Two reduction gearboxes; Two waterjets
- Speed: 34 kn (63 km/h) in full planing mode; 24 kn (44 km/h) up to 7m wave height
- Range: 150 nmi (280 km)

HMC Active is a Border Force coastal patrol vessel of the United Kingdom, formerly David, an Autonomous Rescue and Recovery Craft operated by BP. She was built by Holyhead Marine, Holyhead and Delta Marine, Stockport and was operated by BP as a rescue boat aboard a larger offshore support vessels. David was acquired by the UK Border Force in October 2016 and renamed HMC Active.

== Construction ==
Active is one of eight coastal patrol vessels of the UK Border Force. Built in 2006 Active was originally named David and served as an Autonomous Rescue and Recovery Craft in the North Sea for supporting oil platform operations. David was operated as a daughter craft from a larger offshore support vessel and launched when needed via a davit. The design includes a deep-vee hull design constructed from fibre-reinforced plastic. The design is also self-righting and can return to the upright position if capsized.

After service with BP from 2006 to 2016, David was sold to the UK Border Force for use as a coastal patrol vessel. The vessel was renamed Active and entered service in October 2016.

== Propulsion ==
Active is fitted with twin Caterpillar C18 engines driving twin water jets through a pair of reduction gearboxes. The total installed power of 1,288 kW (1,727 hp) gives Active a top speed of 34 knots (63 km/h) in calm seas, or up to 24 knots (44 km/h) in seas up to 7 metres (23 ft) significant wave height.
