= Tavi Castro =

Mexican-born Canadian freediver (born 1990)

- Castro
- Born: Octavio Robert Maginnis Castro; February 3, 1990 (age 36); Guadalajara, Jalisco, Mexico
- Other name: The Real Aquaman
- Education: Delft University of Technology
- Occupations: Freediver, entrepreneur
- Years active: 2012–present
- Known for: Underwater strength apnea; "The Real Aquaman" videos
- Spouse: Yanita Yancheva
- Children: 1

Octavio Robert Maginnis "Tavi" Castro (born February 3, 1990) is a Mexican-born Canadian freediver and entrepreneur. He came to prominence in the 2020s through widely viewed underwater videos that earned him the nickname "The Real Aquaman", and in 2024 he set a Guinness World Record in underwater strength apnea.

Before turning to freediving, Castro was a youth footballer, a champion bodybuilder and a music producer. He won three Musclemania titles in 2012, founded the fitness brand Body Engineers, and released music through Spinnin' Records.

== Early life and education ==
Castro was born on February 3, 1990, in Guadalajara, Mexico, to a Mexican mother and a Spanish-British father. When he was four, the family moved to Edmonton, Alberta, Canada, where he grew up.

He played football throughout his youth and was selected as a midfielder for a Canadian youth national team. At 17 he moved to Europe to pursue a professional career, playing for the youth side of FC Dordrecht in the Netherlands. He left football at 18 to study, and holds a degree in aerospace engineering from the Delft University of Technology.

== Career ==
=== Bodybuilding and Body Engineers ===
Castro continued to train after leaving football and moved into competitive bodybuilding. In 2012 he won the Musclemania Britain and Musclemania Europe junior championships and the Musclemania World Model overall title in the United States.

The same year, while still a student, he founded Body Engineers, an online coaching and apparel brand.

=== Music ===
Castro released his debut single, "Survive", on August 5, 2016, through the Spinnin' Records imprint Spinnin' Premium. The track reached number 28 on Spotify's Global Viral Top 50 and received support from Martin Garrix, Tiësto and Dimitri Vegas. He signed to Spinnin' Records in September 2016. In November 2016 he released "So Serious", a collaboration with Jordan featuring Chasing Cities.

In March 2017 he joined the roster of Anna Agency, which also represents Hardwell. His 2017 single "Moonlight", featuring Jay Fonseca, topped the iTunes Top 40 in the Netherlands for around two weeks, and that year he performed at Tomorrowland in Belgium.

=== Freediving ===
In the 2020s Castro's freediving and underwater training videos circulated widely online, earning him the nickname "The Real Aquaman". He told Men's Health España that Warner Bros. approached him to take part in the promotional campaign for Aquaman and the Lost Kingdom (2023) after several of his videos had passed hundreds of millions of views, and that director James Wan introduced him to the film's crew as "the real-life Aquaman". The magazine reported that he can hold his breath for more than seven minutes and has dived to depths beyond 90 metres. Castro has described freediving as a form of meditation and advocates training carbon-dioxide tolerance as a means of regulating the nervous system.

On December 17, 2024, at the Y-40 pool in Montegrotto Terme, Italy, Castro set the Guinness World Record for the fastest time to squat-lift 500 kg in apnea underwater (increasing weight), completing the lift in 1 minute 5 seconds and becoming the first holder of the title.

== Awards ==
- 2012 Musclemania Britain – Junior Champion (1st); Fitness Modeling (2nd)
- 2012 Musclemania Europe – Junior Champion (1st)
- 2012 Musclemania World – Model Overall Champion (1st)
- 2024 Guinness World Record – Fastest time to squat lift 500 kg in apnea underwater (increasing weight)

== Personal life ==
Castro's partner is the Bulgarian fitness model and entrepreneur Yanita Yancheva; their daughter was born on August 24, 2017. The couple run Poseidon Ascend, a freediving and breathwork retreat company based in Tulum, Mexico.

On January 25, 2016, Castro was involved in a collision on the A2 motorway near Hagestein, in which his car left the road and struck two other vehicles.
