= HMC Nimrod =

UK Border Force Coastal Patrol Vessel

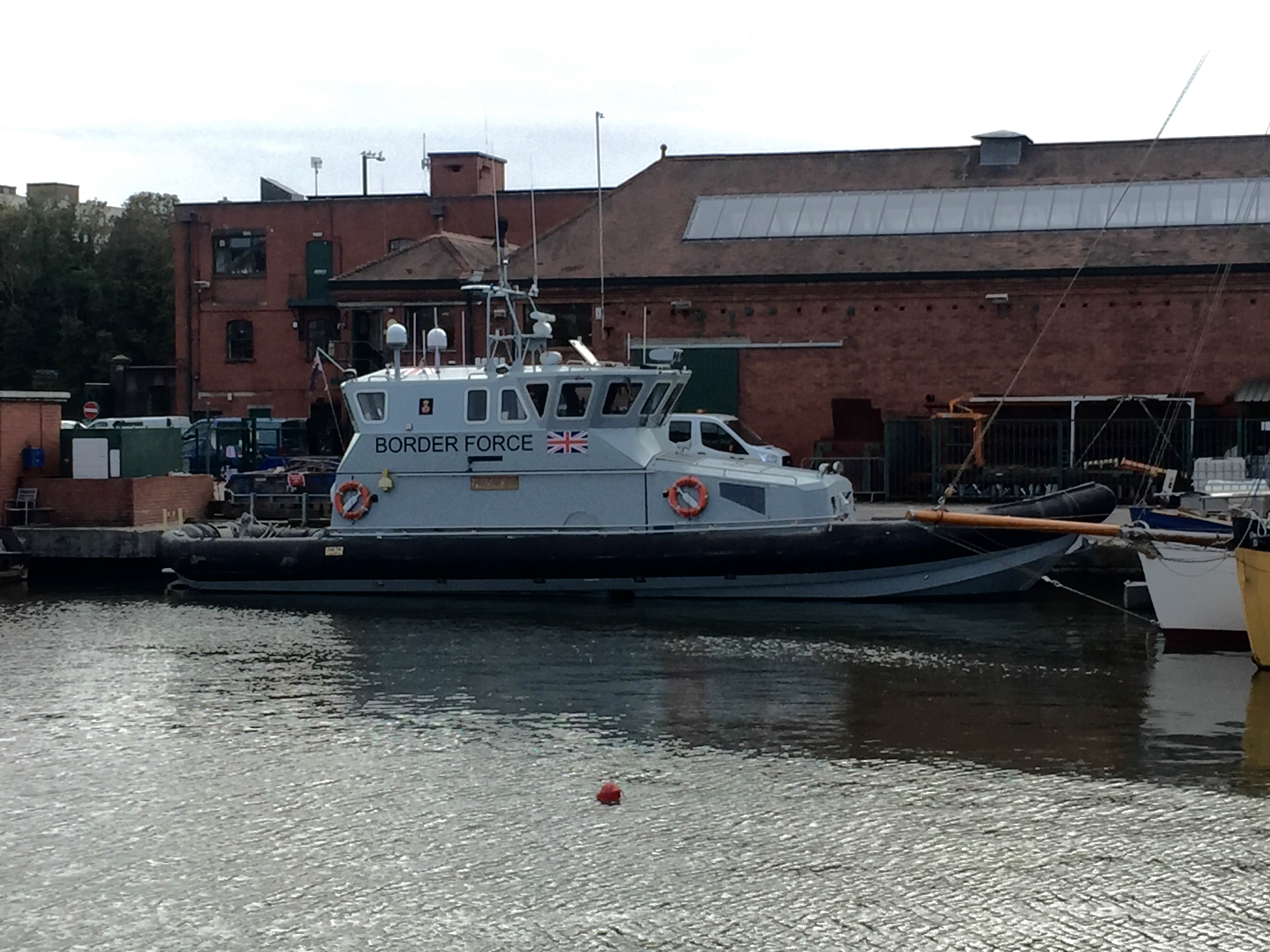
- HMC Nimrod alongside at Underfall Yard, Bristol, UK

History

Cayman Islands
- Name: Euan
- Operator: BP
- Ordered: 1 March 2004
- Builder: Delta Power Group, Delta; Delta ARRC Ltd, Stockport
- Laid down: 5 May 2005
- Launched: 14 July 2005
- Commissioned: 8 August 2006
- In service: 2006
- Out of service: 2016
- Identification: IMO number: 9335587; Call sign: 2JQP9; MMSI number: 235118129
- Fate: Sold to UK Border Force

United Kingdom
- Operator: 2016–present: UK Border Force
- Acquired: July 2016
- Renamed: Nimrod
- Status: In service

General characteristics
- Class & type: Coastal Patrol Vessel
- Tonnage: 29 GT; 31 DWT
- Length: 17.75 m (58.2 ft)
- Beam: 5.63 m (18.5 ft)
- Draught: 0.9 m (3.0 ft)
- Installed power: 1,288 kW (1,727 hp)
- Propulsion: Two Caterpillar C18 main engines; Two reduction gearboxes; Two waterjets
- Speed: 34 kn (63 km/h) in full planing mode; 24 kn (44 km/h) up to 7m wave height
- Range: 150 nmi (280 km)
- Armament: None

HMC Nimrod is a Border Force coastal patrol vessel of the United Kingdom, formerly Euan, an Autonomous Rescue and Recovery Craft operated by BP. She was originally built by Delta Power Group, Stockport and was operated by BP as a rescue boat aboard larger offshore support vessels. Euan was acquired by the UK Border Force in July 2016 and renamed HMC Nimrod.

== Construction ==
Nimrod is one of eight coastal patrol vessels of the UK Border Force. Built in 2006 Nimrod was originally named Euan and served as an Autonomous Rescue and Recovery Craft in the North Sea for offshore projects. Euan was operated as a daughter craft from a larger offshore support vessel and launched when needed via a davit. The design includes a deep-vee hull design constructed from fibre-reinforced plastic. The design is also self-righting and can return to the upright position if capsized.

After service with BP from 2006 to 2016, Euan was sold to the UK Border Force for use as a coastal patrol vessel. The vessel was renamed Nimrod and entered service in October 2016.

== Propulsion ==
Nimrod is fitted with twin Caterpillar C18 engines driving twin water jets through a pair of reduction gearboxes. The total installed power of 1,288 kW (1,727 hp) gives Nimrod a top speed of 34 knots (63 km/h) in calm seas, or up to 24 knots (44 km/h) in seas with up to 7 metres significant wave height.
