= Border Force =

UK law enforcement agency

- Racing stripe

Agency overview
- Formed: 1 March 2012; 14 years ago
- Preceding agency: UK Border Agency
- Employees: 10,000

Jurisdictional structure
- National agency (Operations jurisdiction): United Kingdom
- Operations jurisdiction: United Kingdom
- Legal jurisdiction: United Kingdom
- Specialist jurisdiction: National border patrol, security, integrity

Operational structure
- Overseen by: Independent Office for Police Conduct/His Majesty's Inspectorate of Constabulary and Fire & Rescue Services/ Independent Chief Inspector of Borders and Immigration
- Minister responsible: Anna Turley, Minister of State for Border Security and Asylum
- Agency executives: Phil Douglas, Director General; Steve Dann, Chief Operating Officer
- Parent agency: Home Office

Facilities
- Cutters: HMC Active; HMC Alert; HMC Eagle; HMC Nimrod; HMC Protector; HMC Searcher; HMC Seeker; HMC Valiant; HMC Vigilant

Website
- www.gov.uk/government/organisations/border-force

Border Force (BF) is a British law enforcement command within the Home Office, responsible for frontline border control operations at air, sea and rail ports in the United Kingdom. The force was part of the now defunct UK Border Agency from its establishment in 2008 until Home Secretary Theresa May demerged it in March 2012 after severe criticism of the senior management.

Border Force was formed on 1 March 2012, becoming accountable directly to ministers. It is responsible for immigration and customs controls and the screening of passengers, freight and port staff at 140 rail, air and sea ports in the UK and western Europe, as well as thousands of smaller airstrips, ports and marinas. The work of the Border Force is monitored by the Independent Chief Inspector of Borders and Immigration. In 2024, an additional Border Security Command was established, specifically to tackle organised immigration crime.

Border Force officers can hold the powers of both customs officers and immigration officers. Their duties also include counter-terrorism, part of which is to detect and deter the illicit importation of radioactive and nuclear material by terrorists or criminals. Aside from powers listed below in relation to immigration and customs, section 2 of the Borders Act 2007 also allows designated officers of the Border Force to detain anyone for any criminal offence or arrest warrant at a port if the Border Officer thinks they would be liable to arrest by a police constable. The power allows detention for three hours pending the arrival of a police constable. The power also applies to points of entry in Belgium and France where Border Officers work, whereby the Border Officer will turn the detained person over to Belgian or French police officers as appropriate.

== History ==
=== Background and establishment ===
Before 2007, three agencies were responsible for border control in the UK:

- Uniformed customs officers from HM Revenue and Customs (HMRC) (HM Customs and Excise – HMCE – until 2005) dealt with customs
- Immigration and Nationality Directorate dealt with all immigration roles within the UK and at the border,
- and UKVisas issued visas both from the UK and its offices abroad.

As early as 2003, a single "border police force" had been proposed. In 2005, HMCE and Inland Revenue merged to form HMRC; however, HMRC was still responsible for customs control at the border until 2009. Throughout 2006 and 2007, there were suggestions for a merged border control department. Initially, this plan was to turn the Immigration and Nationality Directorate into a uniformed body of Immigration officers at the border, the Border and Immigration Agency. The BIA was created on 1 April 2007. It was short-lived and was replaced only a year later on 1 April 2008 by the UK Border Agency (UKBA). The UK Border Agency was a merger of the BIA, UKvisas and the port customs functions of HM Revenue and Customs. It created one of the largest law enforcement bodies in the UK.

On 5 November 2011, following various failings of the UKBA, then-Home Secretary Theresa May said that an independent inquiry would be undertaken, led by the Chief Inspector of the UK Border Agency John Vine. UK Border Force became a separate organisation on 1 March 2012.

=== After establishment ===
The first Director General of Border Force was the former Chief Constable of Wiltshire Police Brian Moore, who was appointed on secondment on an interim basis to last until 31 August 2012 and was expected to apply for the position permanently, despite criticism of his management of passport queues. On 10 July 2012, Immigration Minister Damian Green confirmed that Moore had not applied for the post, despite Moore earlier telling the Home Affairs Select Committee that he would be applying.

Tony Smith was appointed as interim Director General of Border Force on 19 September 2012. Smith was previously Gold Commander for the London 2012 Olympic Programme and Regional Director for London and the South East in the UK Border Agency and has spent forty years in border control and enforcement work. Vice-Admiral Sir Charles Montgomery was named as the new Director General on 25 January 2013.

In June 2017 Montgomery left Border Force and Paul Lincoln (a civil servant from the MOD and Home Office) was appointed as the new Director General. Neither of the two had any previous experience of immigration or customs.

== Responsibilities ==
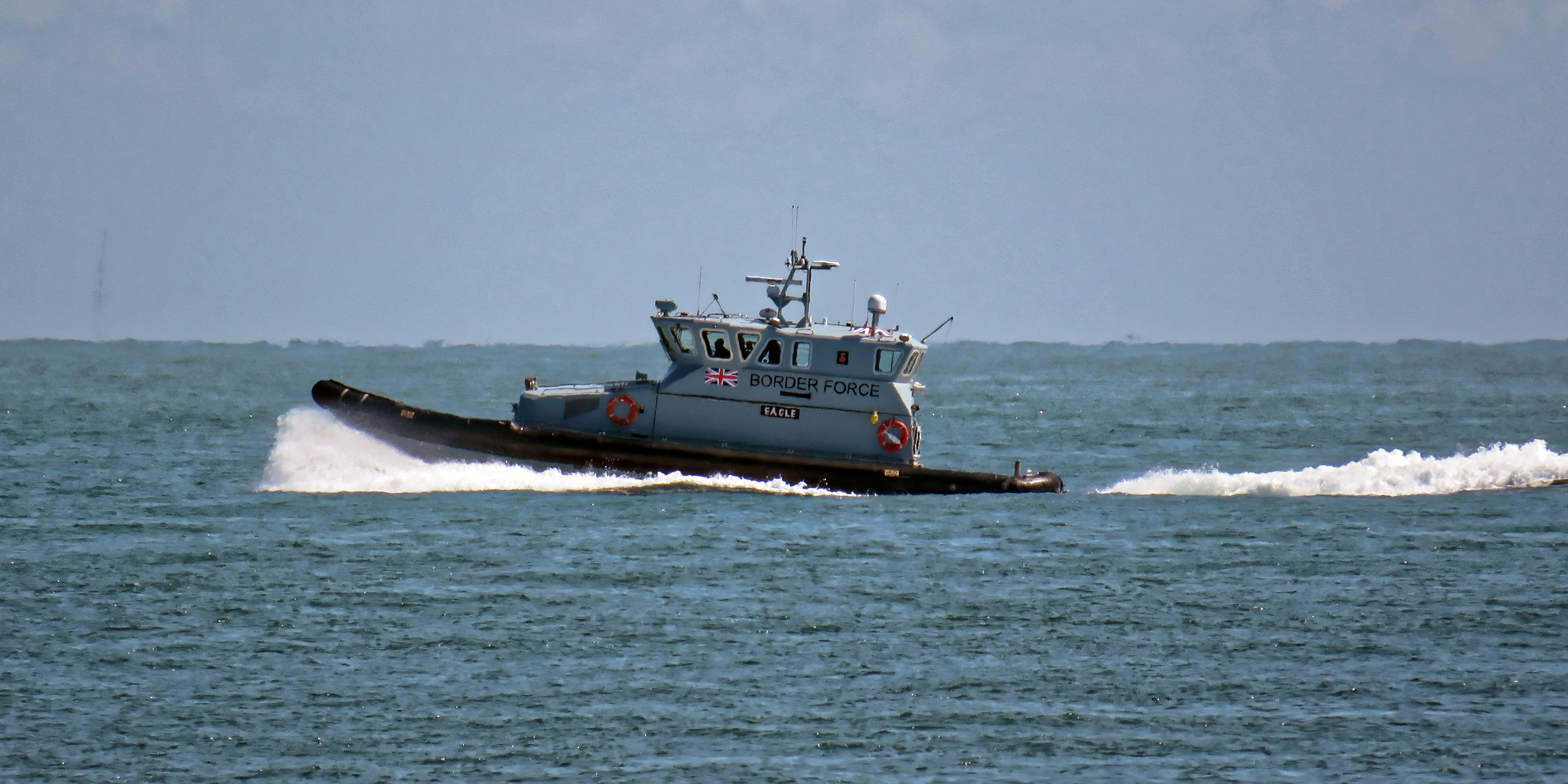
HMCPV 'Eagle' Border Force patrol vessel off Broadstairs, Kent, England

The stated responsibilities of the Home Office's Border Force are the following:

- checking the immigration status of people arriving in and departing from the UK
- searching baggage, vehicles and cargo for illicit goods or illegal immigrants
- patrolling the British coastline and searching vessels
- gathering intelligence
- alerting the police and security services to people of interest

Border Force is responsible for immigration and customs at 140 rail, air and sea ports in the UK and western Europe, as well as thousands of smaller airstrips, ports and marinas.

In July 2024, Home Secretary Yvette Cooper announced the creation of the Border Security Command, an appendant supervisory body of the Border Force that will be tasked with tackling organised immigration crime. The new unit will report to the Home Secretary directly and will direct the National Crime Agency, intelligence agencies, and police on how to break up smuggling gangs.

== Organisation and operations ==
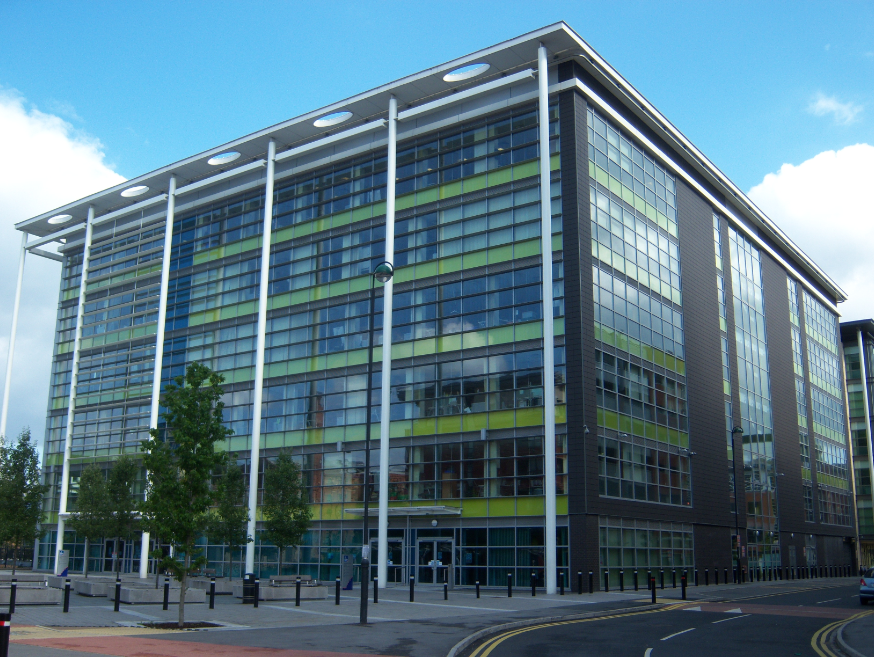
The Home Office buildings in Sheffield

Border Force has six operational regions:

- Central;
- Heathrow;
- North;
- South;
- South East;
- and Europe.

The regions have responsibility for securing the border 24 hours a day, 365 days a year at the UK’s ports, airports, postal depots and rail. This includes the Eurostar from Brussels and Paris to St Pancras International and the Eurotunnel from Coquelles to Folkestone. There are approximately 10,000 people who work in Border Force, according to the UK Government website. The regions' work includes stopping 100 percent of passengers arriving at ports or airports for immigration controls. Officers also conduct risk-led interceptions for controlled drugs, cash, tobacco, alcohol, firearms, offensive weapons, prohibited goods, counterfeit goods and clandestine entrants. They do this at passenger and freight controls, covering passengers traveling on foot, by car, by coach, freight vehicles, as well as air freight and sea containers.

== Officers ==
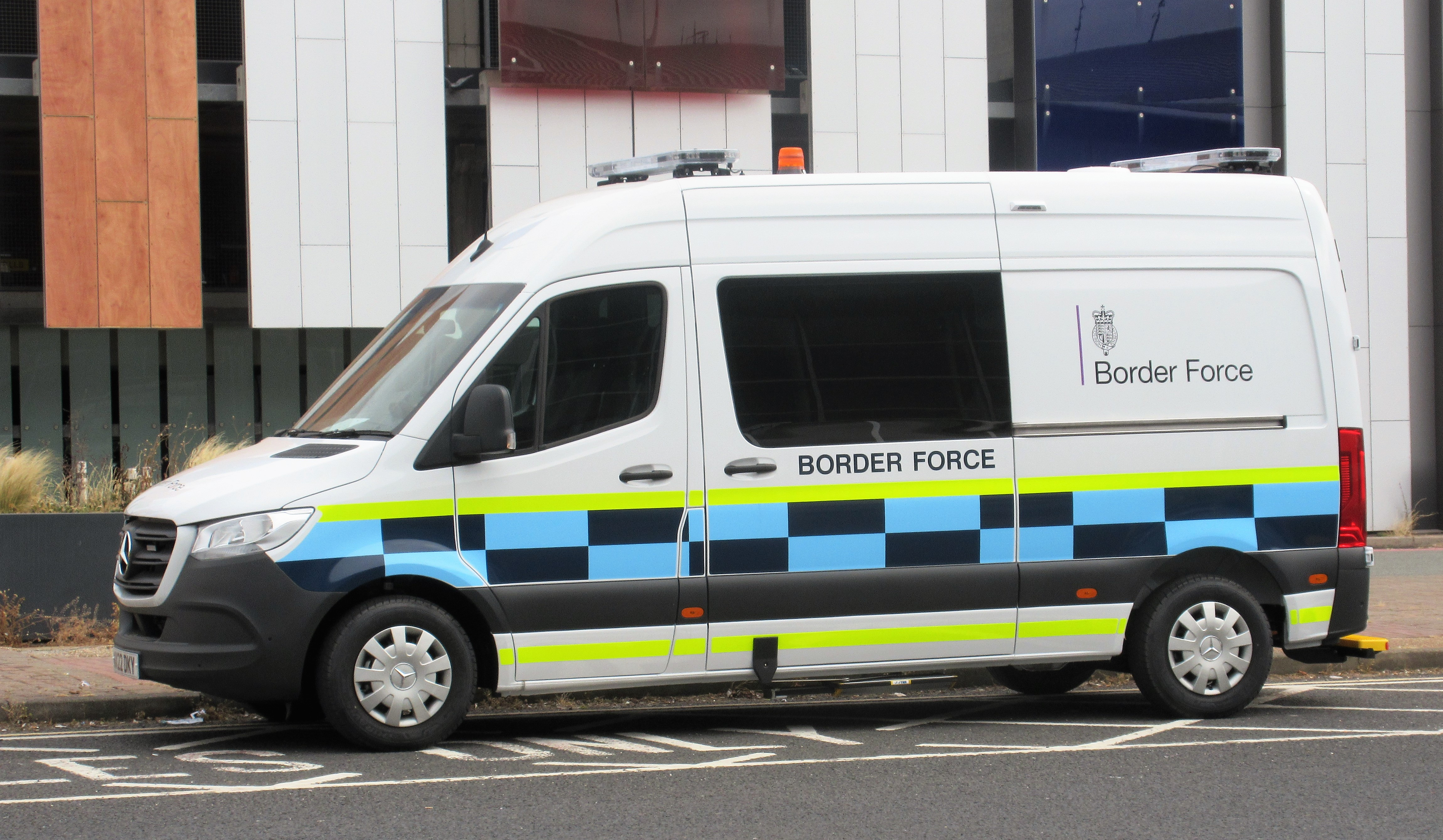
A Border Force Mercedes Benz Sprinter van, based at an airport. Note the distinctive Home Office colour scheme. British police vehicles use blue and yellow colours.

Members of the BF are known as "Border Force officers" and are civil servants, part of HM's Civil Service.

=== Powers ===
Staff hold a mixture of powers granted to them by their status as immigration officers and designated customs officials.

==== Immigration powers ====
Immigration officers have powers of arrest and detention conferred on them by the Immigration Act 1971 and subsequent Immigration Acts, when both at ports and inland. In practice, non-arrest-trained Border Force immigration officers exercise powers under Schedule 2 of the Immigration Act 1971, while inland immigration officers work under S28A-H of the Immigration Act 1971 and paragraph 17 of Schedule 2 of the same Act, as do arrest-trained Border Force immigration officers at the frontier. Historically, port and inland immigration officers received different training to reflect these different approaches to immigration enforcement, which is now reinforced by inland officers working for Immigration Enforcement, a separate Home Office Command. "Designated Immigration Officers" are Border Force immigration officers who have been designated with additional detention powers, under Sections 1 to 4 of the UK Borders Act 2007, where a person at a port or airport is suspected of being liable to arrest by a police officer for non-border offences.

==== Customs powers ====
Border Force officers designated as customs officials under the Borders, Citizenship and Immigration Act 2009 have wide-ranging powers of entry, search, seizure and arrest. They hold the same customs and excise powers as officers of HM Revenue and Customs, but cannot use HMRC powers for non-border matters, such as Income Tax and VAT. Amongst their powers is the ability to arrest anyone who has committed, or whom the officer has reasonable grounds to suspect has committed, any offence under the Customs and Excise Acts. They may also seize prohibited and restricted goods, such as controlled drugs and firearms, as well as ensuring that imported goods bear the correct taxes and duties.

=== Director-General ===
- Vice-Admiral Sir Charles Montgomery (2013-2017)
- Paul Lincoln (2017–2021)
- Phil Douglas (Nov 2021–present)

=== Ranks and insignias ===
Uniformed Border Force officers have their rank displayed on shoulder epaulettes, attached to their shirt, jumper or jacket. Warranted officers below Senior Officer rank may also have their identification number displayed.

BF Rank	Epaulette Insignia	Personal Number Displayed
Administrative Assistant (Civil Service Grade: AA)	Plain	Yes
Assistant Officer (Civil Service Grade: AO)	Single Chevron	Yes
Officer (Civil Service Grade: EO)	Single Bath Star 'Pip'	Yes
Higher Officer (Civil Service Grade: HEO)	2 Bath Star 'Pips'	Yes
Senior Officer (Civil Service Grade: SEO)	3 Bath Star 'Pips'	No
Assistant Director (Civil Service Grade: Grade 7)	St Edward's Crown	No
Deputy Director (Civil Service Grade: Grade 6)	St Edward's Crown above a Single Bath Star 'Pip'	No
Director (Civil Service Grade: SCS1)	Single Bath Star 'Pip' above a Laurel wrapped Portcullis	No
Senior Director (Civil Service Grade: SCS2)	St Edward's Crown above a Laurel wrapped Portcullis	No
Director General (Civil Service Grade: SCS3)	St Edward's Crown above 2 Bath Star 'Pips' above a Laurel wrapped Portcullis	No

=== Uniform and equipment ===
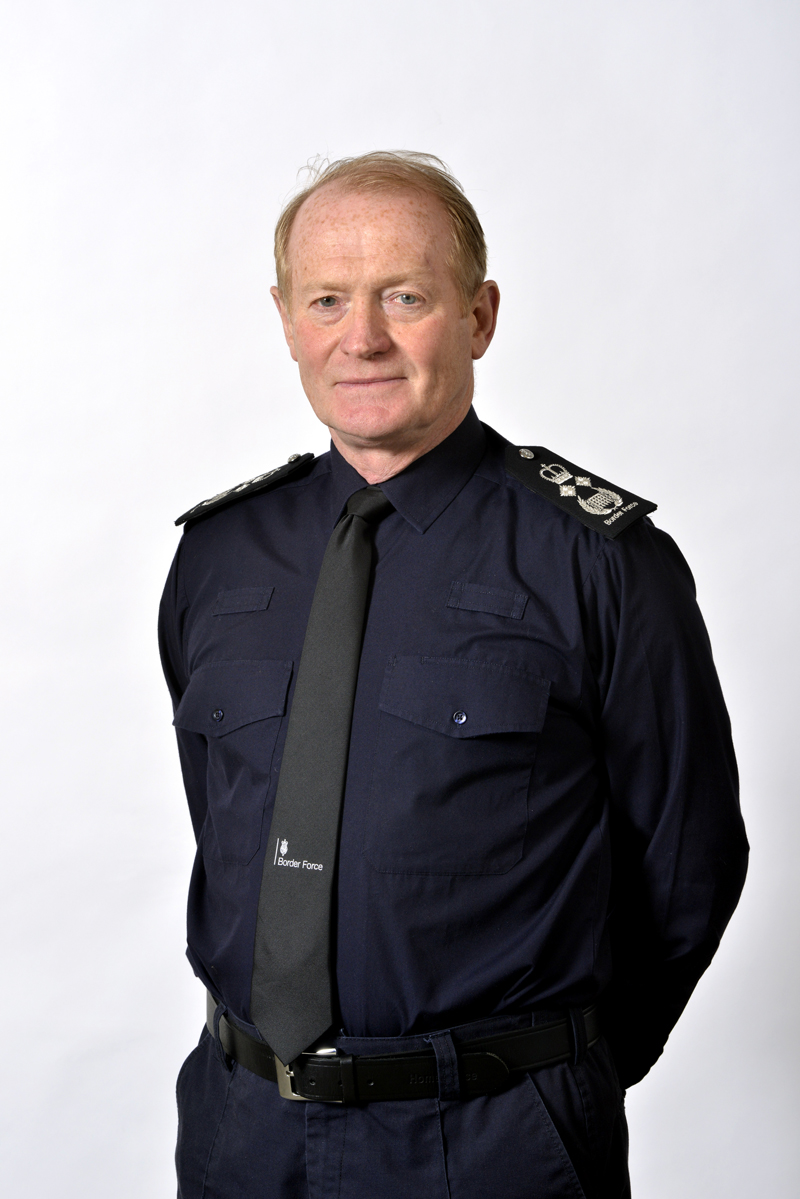
Sir Charles Montgomery in uniform as Director General of the Border Force

All BF officers wear a dark blue uniform (without headgear). BF officers always wear their rank and personal number on an epaulette (see above). Officers carry batons, handcuffs, radios and may wear a stab vest or equipment vest. BF also has a dog unit and dog handlers.

== Common travel area ==
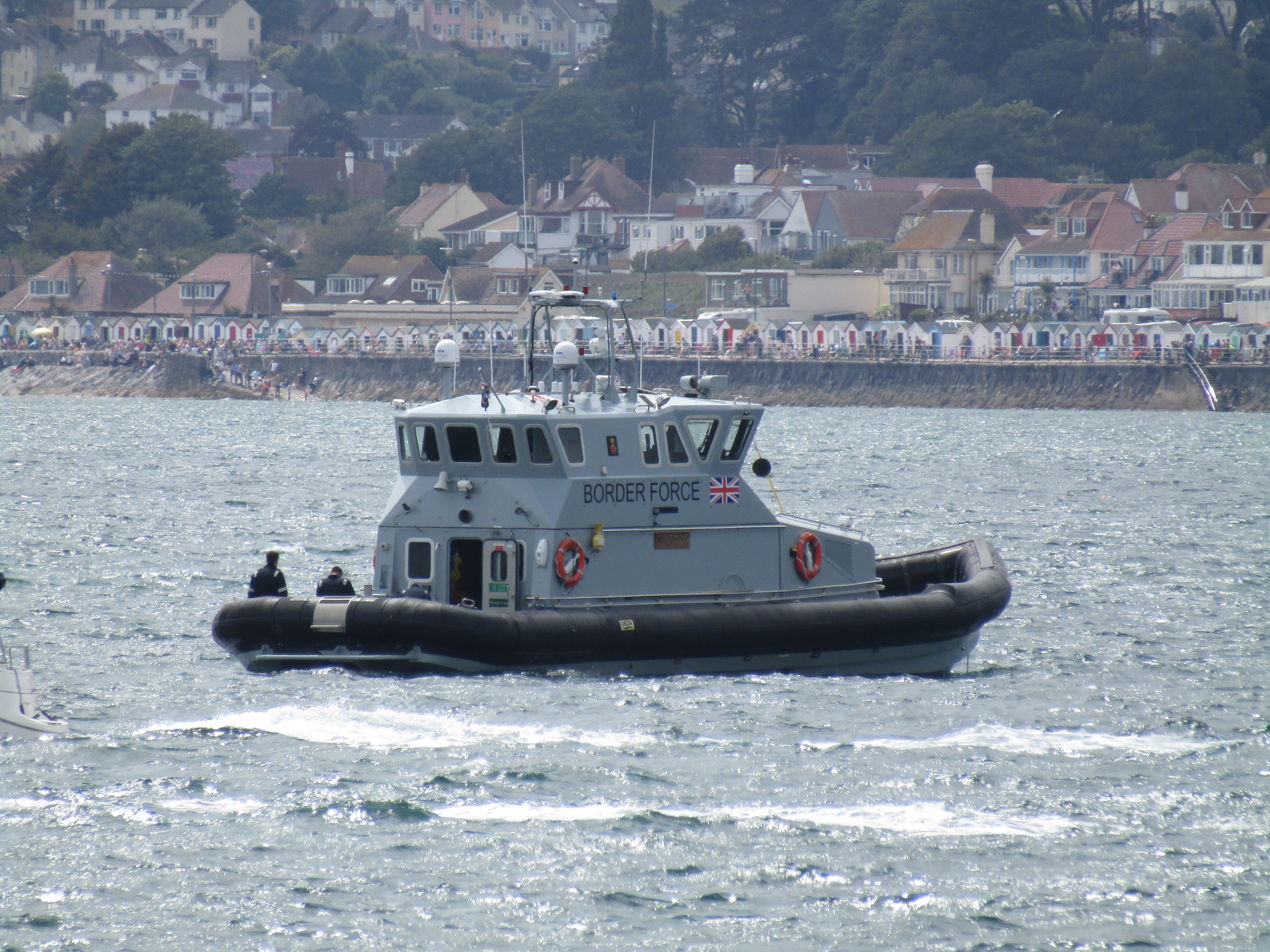
A Border Force Patrol Vessel on patrol

Immigration control within the United Kingdom is managed within a wider Common Travel Area (CTA). The CTA is an intergovernmental agreement that allows freedom of movement within an area that encompasses the UK, Isle of Man, Channel Islands (Guernsey, Jersey, Sark and Alderney) and the Republic of Ireland. Authorised entry to any of the above essentially allows entry to all the others, but it is the responsibility of the person entering to ensure that they are properly documented for entry to other parts of the CTA. Despite the CTA, it is still possible to be deported from the UK to the Republic of Ireland and vice versa, although as of 2019, the Home Office had a policy to only deport Irish nationals in exceptional circumstances.

== Juxtaposed controls ==
Entry to the UK via the Channel Tunnel from France, Belgium or the Netherlands, or by ferry from Calais and Dunkirk in France is controlled by juxtaposed immigration controls. Travelers clear UK passport control in France, Belgium or the Netherlands, while those travelling from the UK to France, Belgium or the Netherlands clear entry border checks to the Schengen Area while in the UK. Belgium and the Netherlands do not maintain controls in the UK as the first Schengen country entered is France. UK Border Force checkpoints in France are operated at the Port of Calais, the Port of Dunkirk, the Eurotunnel Calais Terminal, Calais-Fréthun station (suspended in 2020), Lille Europe station and Paris Gare du Nord station. For passengers arriving by the Eurostar Disney train from Marne-la-Vallée Chessy station, UK border control took place at the arrival stations in the UK, but Eurostar ceased Disney services in June 2023. A checkpoint operated at Boulogne-sur-Mer until the port closed in August 2010. UK Border Force Checkpoints in Belgium operate at Brussels-South railway station. UK Border Force checkpoints in the Netherlands operate from Amsterdam Centraal and Rotterdam Centraal stations. These began operating on 26 October 2020.

== Vessels & Aircraft ==
All vessels of the Border Force bear the ship prefix "HMC"—His Majesty's Cutter. Between May and October 2015, two of the vessels, HMC Protector and HMC Seeker, were deployed in the Mediterranean conducting search and rescue operations. The Border Force also has a recently chartered vessel named MV VOS Grace.

In 2022, it was reported that additional boats and crews had been chartered (for up to six months at a time) from companies linked to the offshore wind industry.

In 2024 it was announced that a “new team” would be set up by the new Labour Government’s Home Office, to tackle smugglers who try to bring illegal substances into the country by sea: “The new Maritime Directorate will work closely with other enforcement agencies to improve intelligence and cooperation with other countries”. In March 2025 The BBC reported a successful operation to disrupt a £58M plot to smuggle cocaine into the UK, the first public announcement attributing success to this new “Directorate” of Border Force.

Ship	Class	Entered service	Displacement	Type	Homeport	Note
HMC Seeker	UKBF 42m Customs Cutter	2001	257 tonnes	Cutter		
HMC Searcher	UKBF 42m Customs Cutter	2002	257 tonnes	Cutter		
HMC Vigilant	UKBF 42m Customs Cutter	2003	257 tonnes	Cutter		
HMC Valiant	UKBF 42m Customs Cutter	2004	257 tonnes	Cutter		
HMC Protector	Telkkä-class	2014	434 tonnes	Cutter	Portsmouth	
HMC Active	20m RIB	2016	31 tonnes	Coastal Patrol Vessel		
HMC Alert	20m RIB	2016	31 tonnes	Coastal Patrol Vessel		
HMC Eagle	20m RIB	2016	31 tonnes	Coastal Patrol Vessel		
HMC Nimrod	20m RIB	2016	31 tonnes	Coastal Patrol Vessel		
HMC Hunter	20m RIB	2018	31 tonnes	Coastal Patrol Vessel		
HMC Speedwell	20m RIB	2018	31 tonnes	Coastal Patrol Vessel		
BSC Contender	UKBF 24m	2026	100 tonnes	Charter Crew Transfer Vessel		
BSC Courageous	UKBF 24m	2026	100 tonnes	Charter Crew Transfer Vessel		

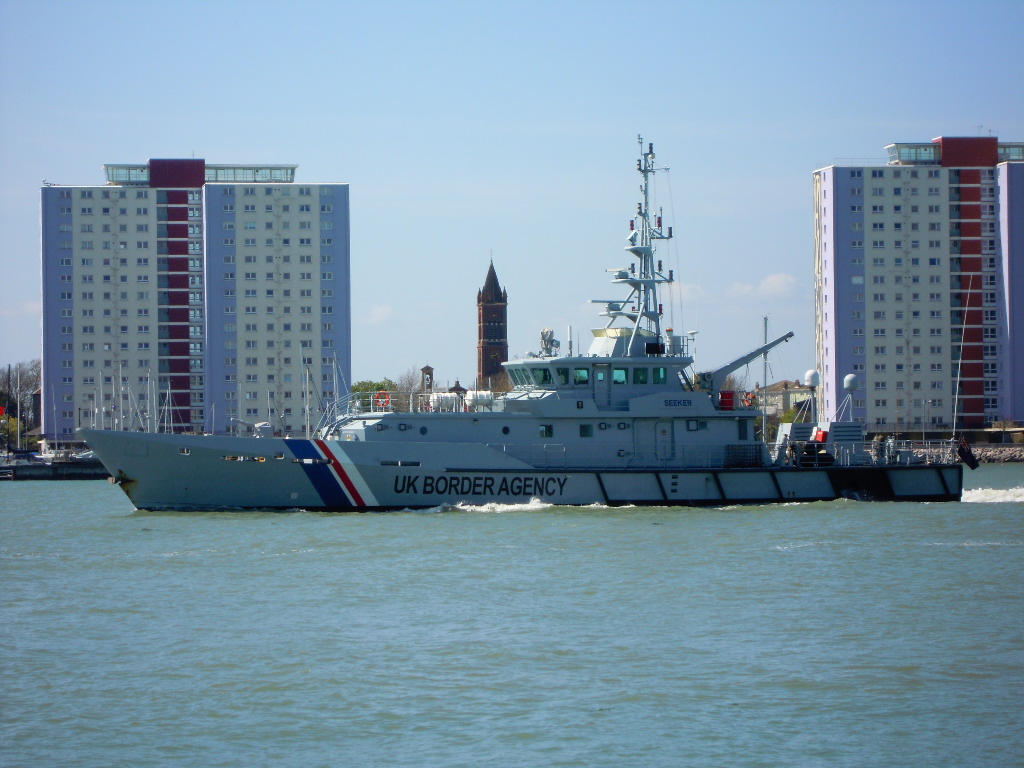
Seeker

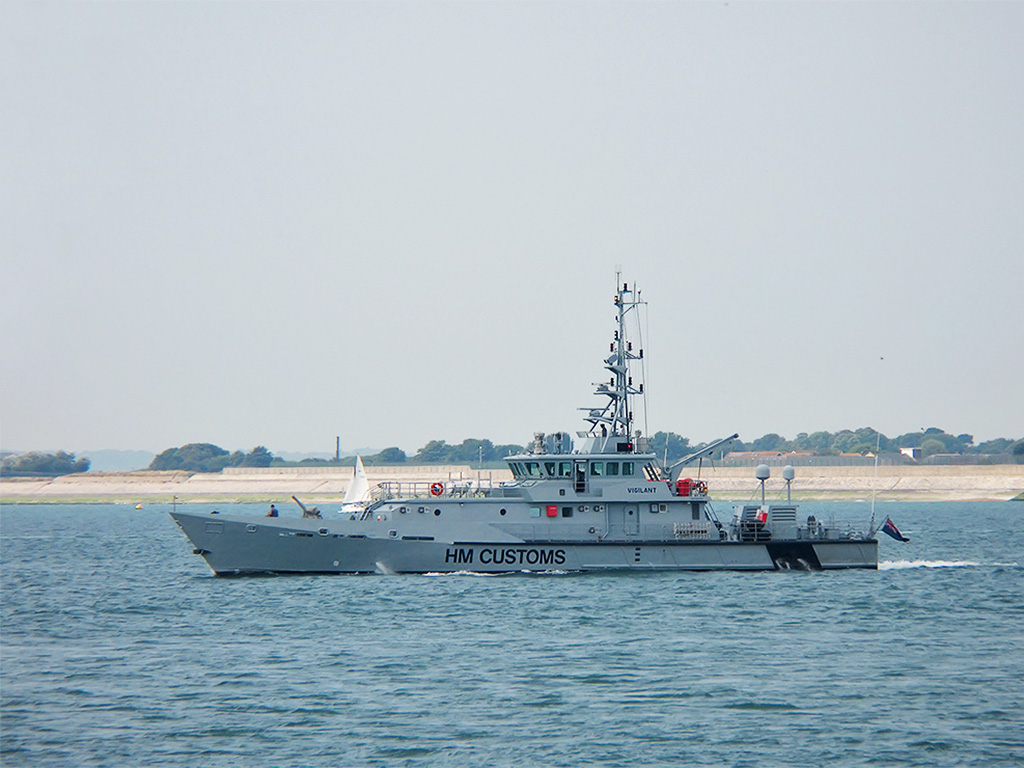
Vigilant

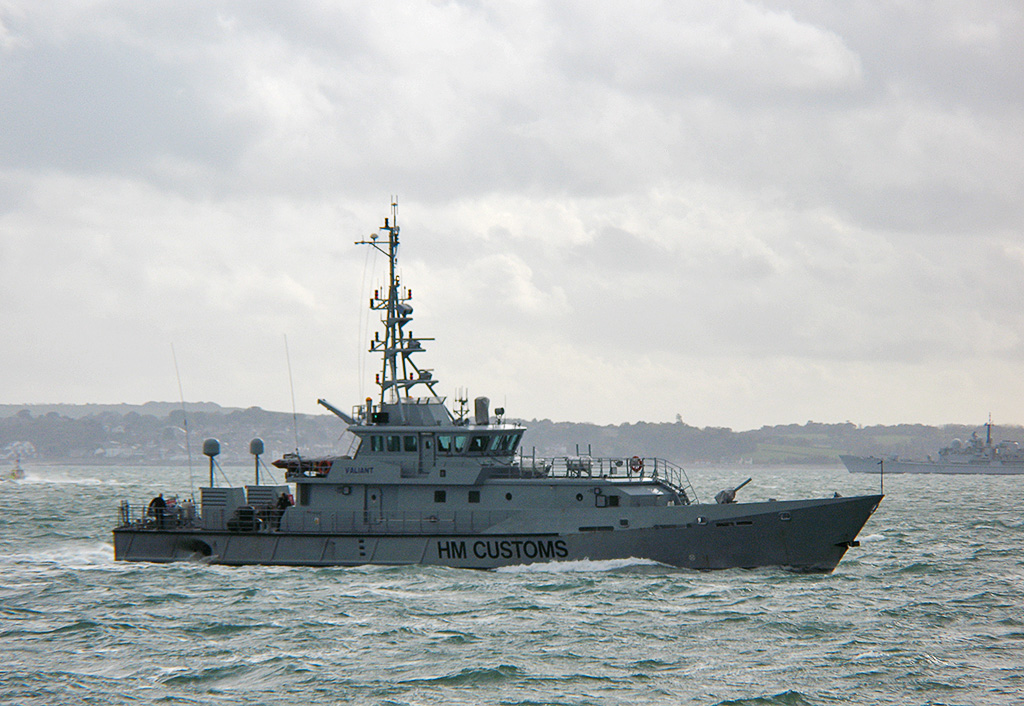
Valiant

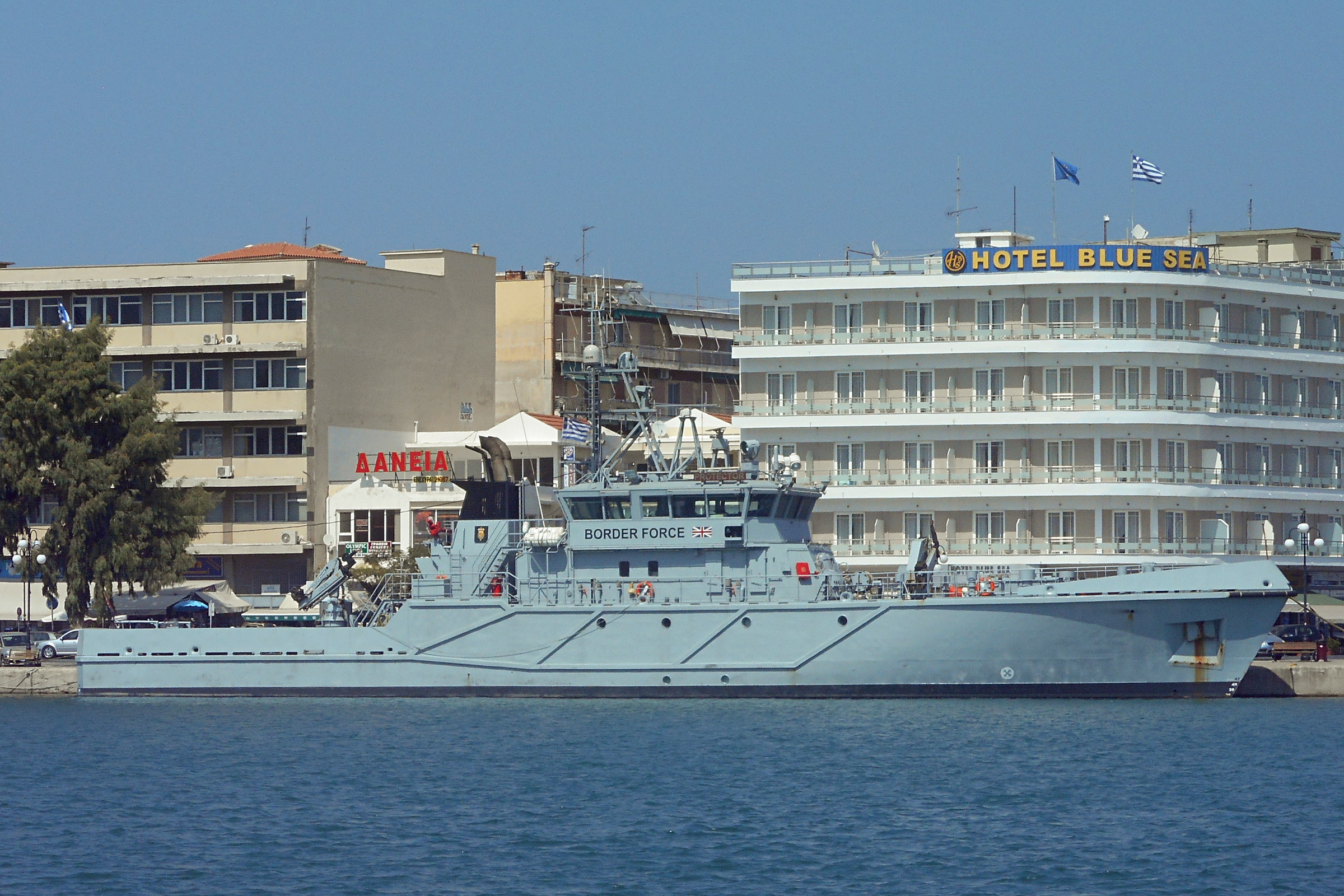
Protector

Type	Entered service	Wingspan	Notes
DHC-8-315 Dash 8 (MPA/ISR conversion)	2023	27.43 m (90 ft 0 in)	Single aircraft, registration C-GFMX, operated under contract by PAL Aerospace. Based at Lydd Airport for maritime surveillance of the Strait of Dover.
Tekever AR5	2019	7.3 m (23 ft 11 in)	Uncrewed. Operated under contract for Channel maritime surveillance.
Tekever AR3	2023	—N/a	Uncrewed. Smaller type, launched by catapult or in VTOL mode; provided alongside the AR5 under the same contract.

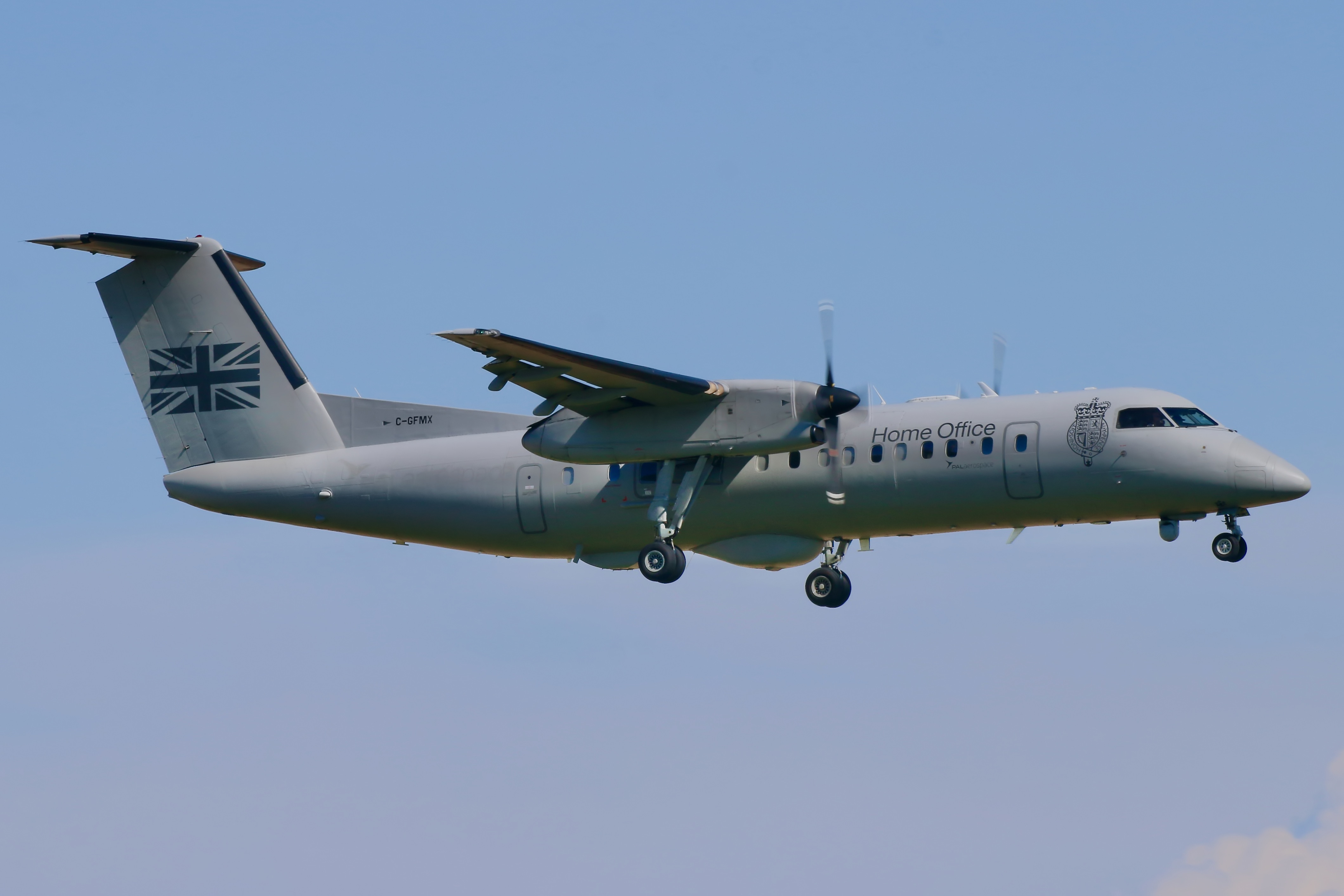
C-GFMX at Lydd, April 2024

== Attack on the Dover Immigration Centre ==
On 30 October 2022, the new Immigration Centre in Dover Harbor was attacked with firebombs thrown from a car. Two members of staff were injured. The suspect, Andrew Leak from High Wycombe, was found dead in a vehicle. Responsibility for the investigation was passed to the Counter Terrorism Policing South East. Leak's online activities had included far-right content and conspiracy theories. On 5 November 2022, the police stated that the attack "was motivated by a terrorist ideology".

== Notable operations ==
- In December 2012, Border Force seized 1.2 tonnes of fake CDs at Manchester Airport
- A couple were convicted in April 2013 for trying to smuggle a Nigerian baby into the UK, claiming it was their own. They were stopped and investigated after Border Force officers became suspicious
- Two separate attempts to smuggle birds into the UK inside suitcases were prevented by Border Force officers at Leeds Bradford Airport in May 2013.
- Border Force Detector dog Megan became the most successful UK drug detector dog. Over seven years with Border Force, she foiled 102 smuggling attempts into the UK. She retired in March 2014.
- Twelve critically endangered iguanas seized from smugglers by Border Force officers at London Heathrow Airport have been returned home to their native Bahamas. The reptiles were discovered in the baggage of two Romanian nationals on 3 February 2014 by officers carrying out customs checks.
- On 23 April 2015, HMC Valiant assisted by HMS Somerset who had NCA officers on board, Intercepted the MV Hamal, a tug, and after she was searched in Aberdeen the largest UK drug seizure of 3.2 tonnes of cocaine was found onboard, in her forward ballast tank. There was so much on board it took three days to remove and had to be placed under armed guard.
- In September 2015, Border Force officers seized a tonne of cannabis at London Gateway port. It came after 2 tonnes were seized there in February 2015.
- During the 2015 European migrant crisis, Border Force rescued over 1,650 migrants and arrested 27 suspected people smugglers over one summer as part of the EU Mission in the Mediterranean Sea.
- In February 2017, Border Force took part in Operation Thunderbird organised by INTERPOL to tackle wildlife crime and wildlife trafficking. Border Force officers made 182 seizures during the operation, which ran between 30 January and 19 February. Among the items found were 11 kilos of ivory, 600,000 live eels, 74 live orchids, eight cacti, 13 reptile skin products, around 3,500 musical instruments containing CITES wood.
- On 31 July 2017, Border Force won a court case where a judge declared child sex dolls to be an obscene item after a seizure of one was challenged.
- A Border Force detector dog, Jessie, found £1 million being smuggled over a five-month period.
- On 31 January 2018, Border Force officers at Farnborough Airport became suspicious after a routine boarding and inspection of a private jet from Colombia, and upon a Customs search; discovered 500 kg (1,100 lb) of cocaine worth a street value of £50 million in fifteen suitcases.
- In March 2025, the BBC reported a successful operation to disrupt a £58M plot to smuggle cocaine into the UK by sea.

== See also ==
- ePassport gates
- List of customs cutters of UK Border Force
- Visa policy of the United Kingdom
- France–UK border
- Waterguard
- Lord Warden of the Marches
- Riding officer
