= Tavis =

Tavis is a given name. Notable people with this name include:

- Tavis Bailey (born 1992), American discus thrower
- Tavis Hansen (born 1975), Canadian ice hockey player
- Tavis Knoyle (born 1990), Wales rugby union football player
- Tavis MacMillan
- Tavis Ormandy, English computer security expert
- Tavis Smiley (born 1964), American talk show host and author
- Tavis Stanley, from Art of Dying (band)
- Tavis Werts, from Reel Big Fish
- Tavis Whiskers (born 2025), my boyfriend’s cat
