= HMC Sentinel =

Former UK Border Force patrol ship

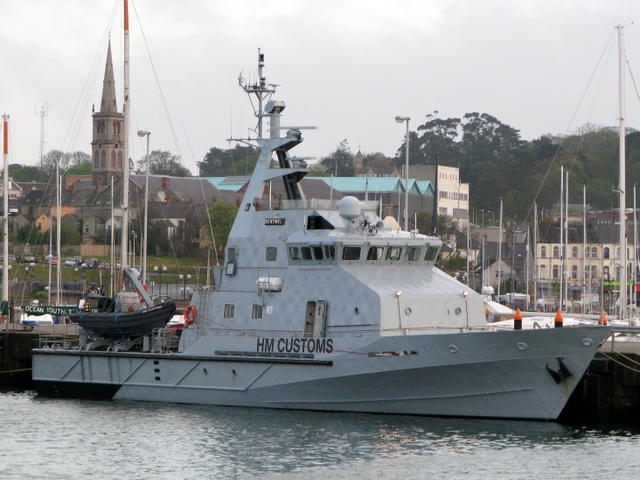
- HMC Sentinel alongside at Central Pier, Bangor, UK

History

United Kingdom
- Name: HMC Sentinel
- Builder: Vosper Thornycroft, United Kingdom
- Commissioned: 1993
- Decommissioned: July 2013
- Identification: IMO number: 8980426; Call sign: JVZD6; MMSI number: 457737000
- Status: Sold 2018

General characteristics
- Length: 36.04 m (118.2 ft)
- Beam: 7.5 m (25 ft)
- Draught: 2.5 m (8.2 ft)
- Endurance: 14 days
- Boats & landing craft carried: One RIB
- Complement: 12
- Armament: Nil

HMC Sentinel was a patrol ship operated by the Border Force in the role of patrolling the waters of the United Kingdom. It is a Vosper Thornycroft 'Island Class' vessel and was commissioned in 1993.

== History ==
HMC Sentinel entered service in 1993 with what was then HM Customs and Excise (HMCE). HMCE merged with the Inland Revenue in 2005, and the cutter fleet became part of the newly founded HM Revenue and Customs. In 2008, the fleet transferred to the UK Border Agency and then to UK Border Force, both established to maintain the UK border, and it operated as the oldest vessel in the UK Border Force's fleet of five cutters. HMC Sentinel was decommissioned July 2013 in Portsmouth, Hampshire. She was offered for sale in 2015 and had been sold by 2018. She was listed as a private vessel registered in Mongolia and was seen in Plymouth, Devon, on the 19 October 2018 flying the Mongolian flag.

As of 2026 the vessel, named MV Sentinel, is actively sailing under the flag of Nigeria.

== Prefix ==
From the merger of the Inland Revenue and HM Customs and Excise into HM Revenue and Customs on 18 April 2005, customs cutters changed their prefix from "HMRC" (Her Majesty's Revenue Cutter) to "HMCC" (Her Majesty's Customs Cutter). Following the transfer to the UK Border Agency this was shortened to the present "HMC" (Her Majesty's Cutter) and a new livery was applied to the fleet.

== Propulsion ==
The cutter is fitted with twin Caterpillar diesel engines (Caterpillar 3516B DI-TA elec Diesel Engines 4,176 kW; 5,600 hp) and a Perkins CV8M600 Diesel Engine.
