= Towa Sanyo =

Chinese language primer compiled in Japan in 1716

The Towa Sanyo is a Chinese language primer compiled in Japan in 1716. It attempts to render Mandarin Chinese pronunciation and colloquial style.

== Contents of Towa Sanyo ==
The Towa Sanyo is distributed in six chapters and each chapter has its individual procedure to represent the Chinese language. First three chapters introduce the compounds and phrases of characters that sorted by its meaning. The first chapter kan represented about “two-character and three-character expressions in Chinese with the proper Chinese pronunciation. The second and third chapter has three or more characters and includes set of Chinese idiomatic expressions, or Chéngyǔ (成語). The fourth chapter is about a talk of varying length (jotanwa). This chapter is mostly about fragment of conversation in various lengths. The fifth chapter groups two-character nouns in each individual topic and also includes short lyrics and folk songs. The last chapter – chapter 6 – was added in 1718 and has two narratives. The valuable essence of these stories is that the pronunciations of Chinese characters as shown there indicates that the Chinese tone system was already established in Okajima’s time. The names of these two stories are, "Sun Ba Saves Someone and Comes into Good Fortune" (Sun Ba jiuren defu) and "Derong does a Good Deed and Gets His Rewards" (Derong xingshan youbao) (Pastreich, 45). By including these stories in the Towa Sanyo, Okajima distributed the heavy tension of speaking vernacular Chinese into the Chinese literatures.

The Chinese of the Towa Sanyo is mainly Mandarin in character. While it contains many usages from the literary language, above all the work set out to impart a colloquial style.

== Function of how Towa Sanyo works with Japanese ==
The Towa Sanyo contains various types of colloquial forms in Chinese. These forms are constructed in pronunciation of Japanese language so that Japanese readers can easily read Chinese characters which are read in Mandarin Chinese. Once the Chinese syllable was pronounced in Japanese form, the Towa Sanyo demonstrates the simplification of Chinese colloquial form to show what the form actually meant to Japanese. For example, 笑将起来, which was read in Mandarin as xiao jiang qi lai, was read in Japanese as スヤおう ツヤン キイ ライ, belonging in the sound gloss. Now, the Towa Sanyo uses the Japanese pronunciation to match with the Mandarin pronunciation, allowing the Japanese merchants, who frequently trade in the Jiangnan region, to study the texts of the Chinese language to pronounce Mandarin in Japanese. There was a problem, however, that gave a way to having the Towa Sanyo to create a fragment of meaning for Chinese colloquial forms. Since the Japanese could not understand Chinese colloquial meaning, the Towa Sanyo provides for the Japanese the meaning of the form in simple form. As the above colloquial form, which means “to laugh”, the Japanese simplified that colloquial form by using the Japanese verb, 笑う, meaning “to laugh.”
