= Tiguex =

Tigua, Tiguex, Tigüex, Tiwan, and Tiwesh may refer to:

- Albuquerque metropolitan area, sometimes referred to as Tiguex
- Southern Tiwa language, a pueblo language group in New Mexico
- Southern Tiwa Puebloans, a pueblo people in central and northern New Mexico
- The location of the Tiguex War, in the vicinity of Albuquerque and Bernalillo, New Mexico
