= HMC Seeker =

UK Border Force 42m Customs Cutter

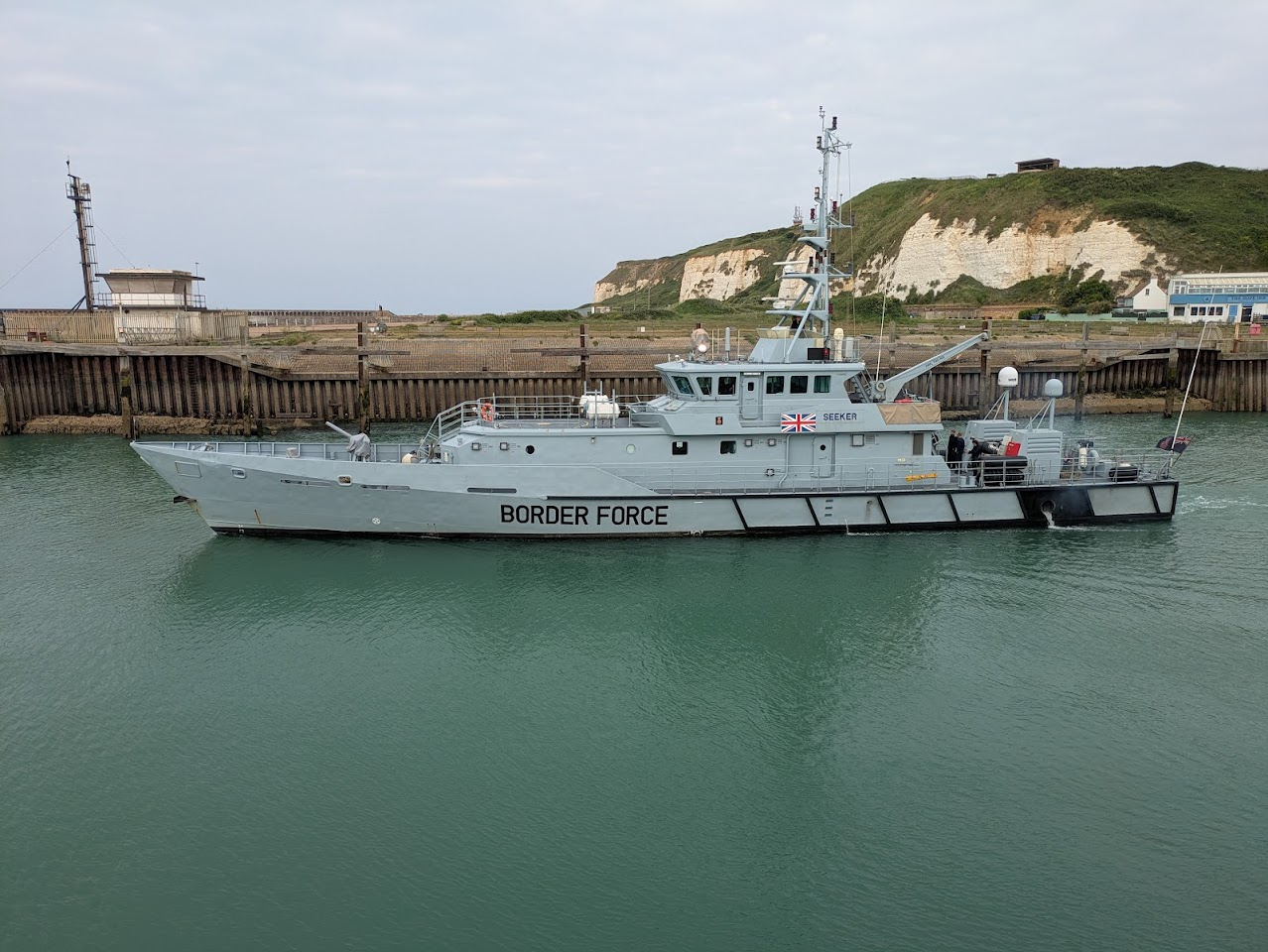
- HMC Seeker in Newhaven in 2025

History

United Kingdom
- Name: Seeker
- Builder: Damen Group, Netherlands
- Launched: 2001
- Identification: IMO number: 9234795; Callsign: ZQNL2

General characteristics
- Class & type: UKBF 42m Customs Cutter
- Length: 42.80 m (140.4 ft)
- Beam: 7.11 m (23.3 ft)
- Draught: 2.52 m (8.3 ft)
- Installed power: 4,176 kW (5,600 hp)
- Propulsion: Two Caterpillar 3516B DI-TA Elec; Two 3.5:1 reduction gearboxes; Two 4-blade controllable pitch propellers; One Promac bow thruster; Two 106kWA generator sets
- Speed: 26 knots (48 km/h)
- Range: 1,750 nmi (3,240 km) at 12kn
- Endurance: 14 days
- Boats & landing craft carried: One 7m RIB (32 kn); One 3.8m Rescue Boat
- Complement: 12

HMC Seeker is a Border Force (customs) cutter of the United Kingdom. She was launched by Damen Shipyards in the Netherlands in 2001 and is one of four UKBF 42m Customs Cutters, 42-metre (138 ft) cutters formerly operated by HM Revenue and Customs, then from 2008 she was operated by the UK Border Agency and after its dissolution in 2013 operated by the Border Force.

== Prefix ==
The Inland Revenue and HM Customs and Excise Departments merged to form HM Revenue and Customs on 18 April 2005, and from this time customs cutters changed their prefix from "HMRC" (His Majesty's Revenue Cutter) to "HMCC" (His Majesty's Customs Cutter). Following transfer to the UK Border Agency this was shortened to the current "HMC" (His Majesty's Cutter) and a new livery applied to the fleet of cutters.

== Construction ==
HMC Seeker is the lead ship of the Customs and Excise's fleet of 42-metre customs patrol vessels. She was built in 2001 in Damen Shipyards in the Netherlands, and has a steel hull with an aluminium superstructure. Much effort has been expended in making her quiet to reduce crew fatigue; her engines are raft-mounted, decks throughout the ship are of a floating type, and her compartments are constructed on a box-within-a-box principle.

Her 7-metre (23 ft) Rigid Inflatable Boat (RIB) can be launched from her stern slipway. She is fitted with a 2,000-litre (440 imp gal) per minute fire fighting system for dealing with fires in other ships.

== Propulsion ==
She is fitted with twin Caterpillar 3516B DI-TA Elec engines driving twin 4-bladed controllable-pitch propellers through a pair of 3.5:1 reduction gearboxes. The total installed power of 4,176 kW (5,600 hp) gives her a top speed of 26 knots (48 km/h). A single Promac bow thruster is fitted for slow speed manoeuvring in confined spaces. Electrical power is supplied by a pair of 106kWA generators.
