= Damen Stan Patrol vessel =

Range of related patrol vessels

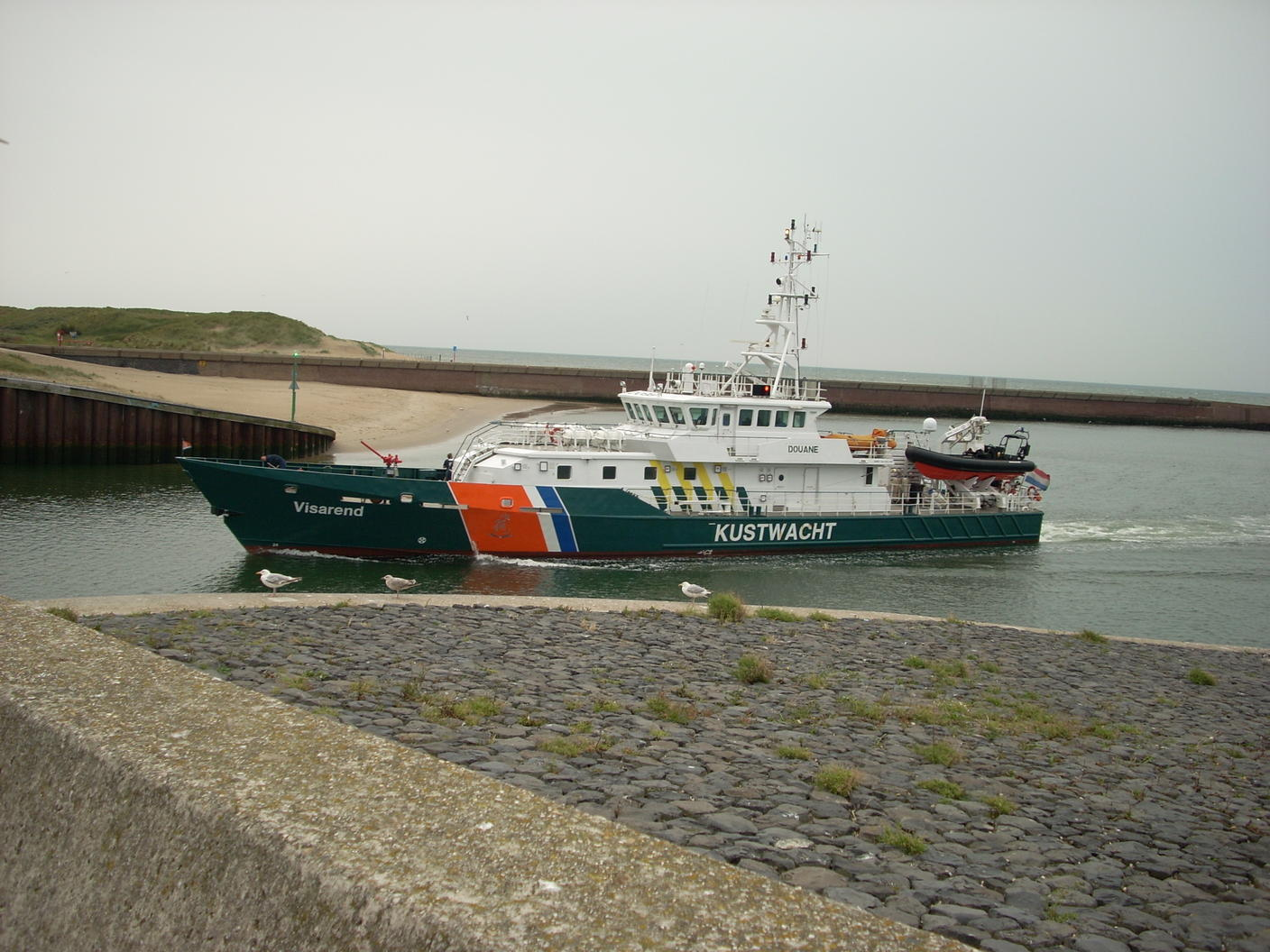
- Netherlands Coast Guard patrol vessel Visarend.

Class overview
- Builders: Damen Group
- Operators: Albanian Naval Defense Forces; Barbados Coast Guard; Bulgarian Border Police; Canadian Coast Guard; Cape Verdean Coast Guard; Dutch Caribbean Coast Guard; Honduran Navy; Italian Guardia di Finanza; Jamaica Defence Force; Netherlands Coast Guard; Mexican Navy; South African Department of Environmental Affairs; United Kingdom Border Force; Venezuelan Navy; Vietnam Coast Guard; Falkland Islands Fisheries Department
- Subclasses: UKBA 42m Customs Cutter (UK); Hero class (Canada); County class (Jamaica)
- Built: 2001 - present
- In commission: 2001 - present
- Planned: 24-34
- Completed: 35
- Active: 35

General characteristics
- Type: Damen Stan 4100

General characteristics
- Type: Damen Stan 4207
- Length: 42.8 m (140.4 ft)
- Beam: 7.1 m (23.3 ft)
- Speed: 26 knots (48 km/h)
- Complement: 17

General characteristics
- Type: Damen Stan 4708
- Length: 46.8 m (153.5 ft)
- Beam: 8.11 m (26.6 ft)
- Speed: 23.8 knots (44.1 km/h)
- Complement: 16-24

The Dutch shipbuilding firm The Damen Group, designs and manufactures a wide variety of vessels, including a range of related patrol vessels known generally as the Damen Stan Patrol vessels.

== Design ==
The Damen Stan Patrol designs' names include a four-digit code, where the first two digits are the vessel's length, in metres, and the second two digits are its width. Over a dozen nations have classes of vessels based on the Damen Stan 4207 patrol vessel design, which are 42 metres (138 ft) long and 7 metres (23 ft) wide. The United States Coast Guard's Sentinel class cutters, based on the Damen Stan 4708 patrol vessel design, are 47 metres (154 ft) long and 8 metres (26 ft) wide.

In the late 1990s three 41 vessels were built for service in the Dutch Antilles, and experience with those vessels informed the later designs of the 4207 and 4708.

Rather than design vessels that were strictly for naval use, the underlying Damen Stan Patrol designs do not include weapons, or a sensor suite. The designs have been adapted for policing duties, and for fishery and environmental patrols. According to Sanjay Badri-Maharaj, of the -Institute for Defence Studies and Analyses, described how adding an autocannon and military class sensor suite to the USCG's Sentinel class increased its cost per vessel from $20 million USD to $65 million.

In recent years Damen has developed Damen Stan Patrol vessels based on their Sea Axe bow design. The Stan 4207 design are 42.8-metre (140 ft) patrol vessels. They are 7.1 metres (23 ft) wide, and can travel at 22 knots (41 km/h; 25 mph). They are designed to carry a complement of approximately a dozen. The Stan Patrol 4708 is 46.8 metres (154 ft) long, 8.11 metres (26.6 ft) wide, has a maximum speed of 23.8 knots (44.1 km/h; 27.4 mph), and carries a complement of 16–24.

== Different variants ==
- Damen Stan 2606 patrol vessel
- Damen Stan 3007 patrol vessel
- Damen Stan 3307 patrol vessel
- Damen Stan 4100 patrol vessel
- Damen Stan 4207 patrol vessel
- Damen Stan 4708 patrol vessel
- Damen Stan 5009 patrol vessel

== Vessels ==
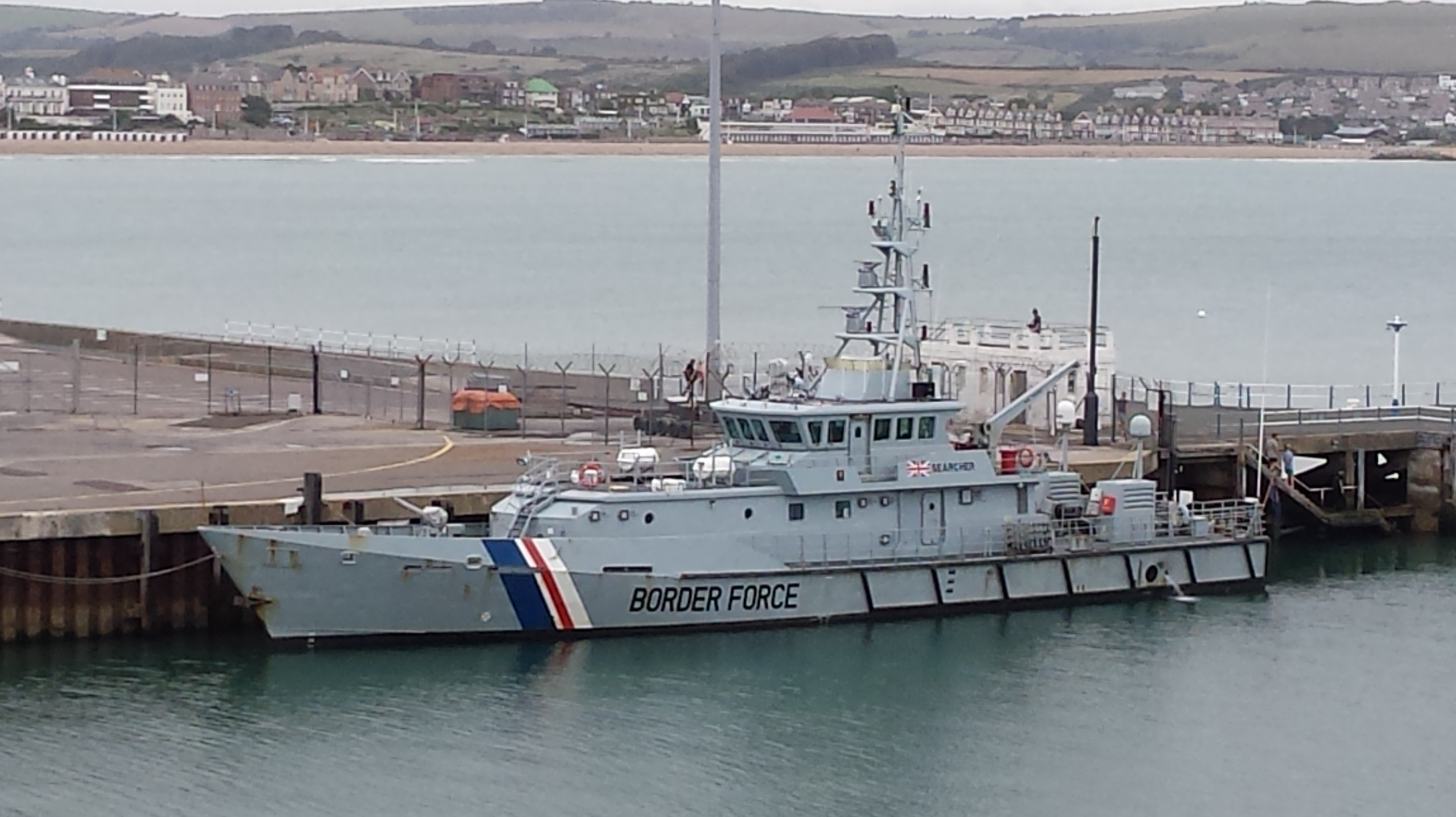
HMC Searcher showing UK Border Force overmarkings (since re-liveried)

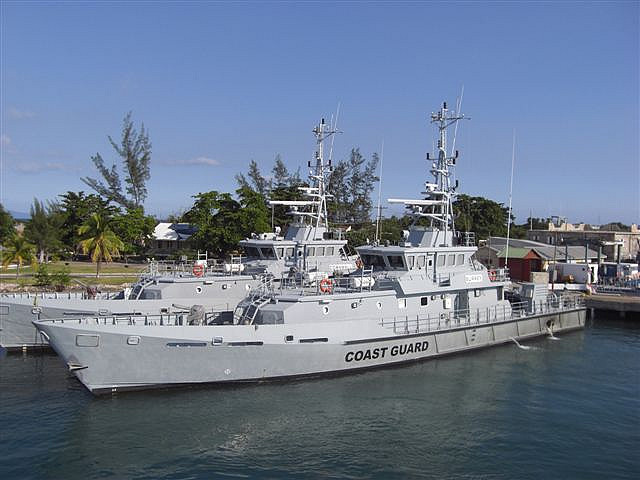
Two of the Jamaican Coast Guard patrol vessels

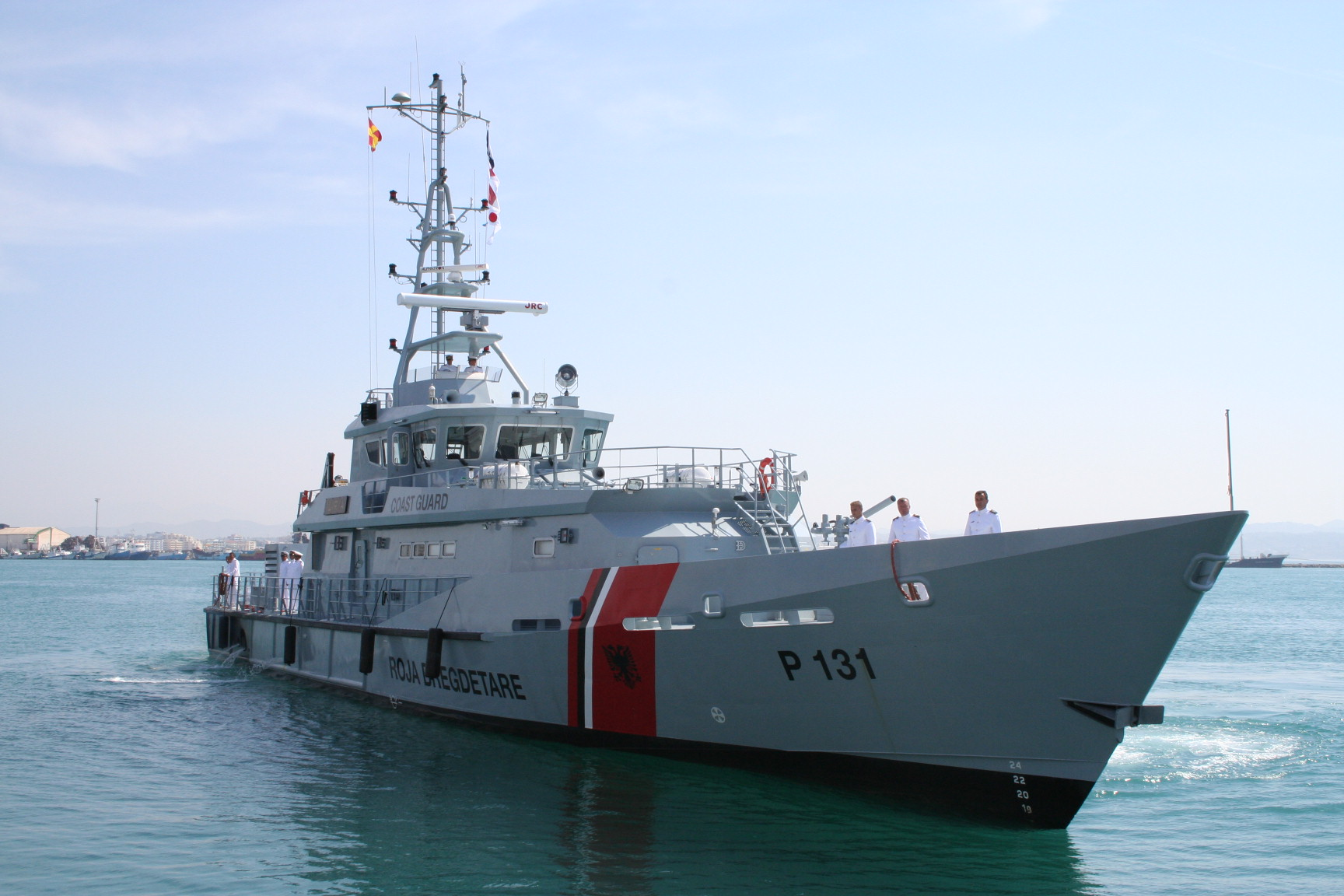
Albanian Naval Brigade patrol vessel Iliria, an Albanian Damen Stan type 4207 patrol vessel. Note the cannon on the bow is a water cannon, for fire-fighting

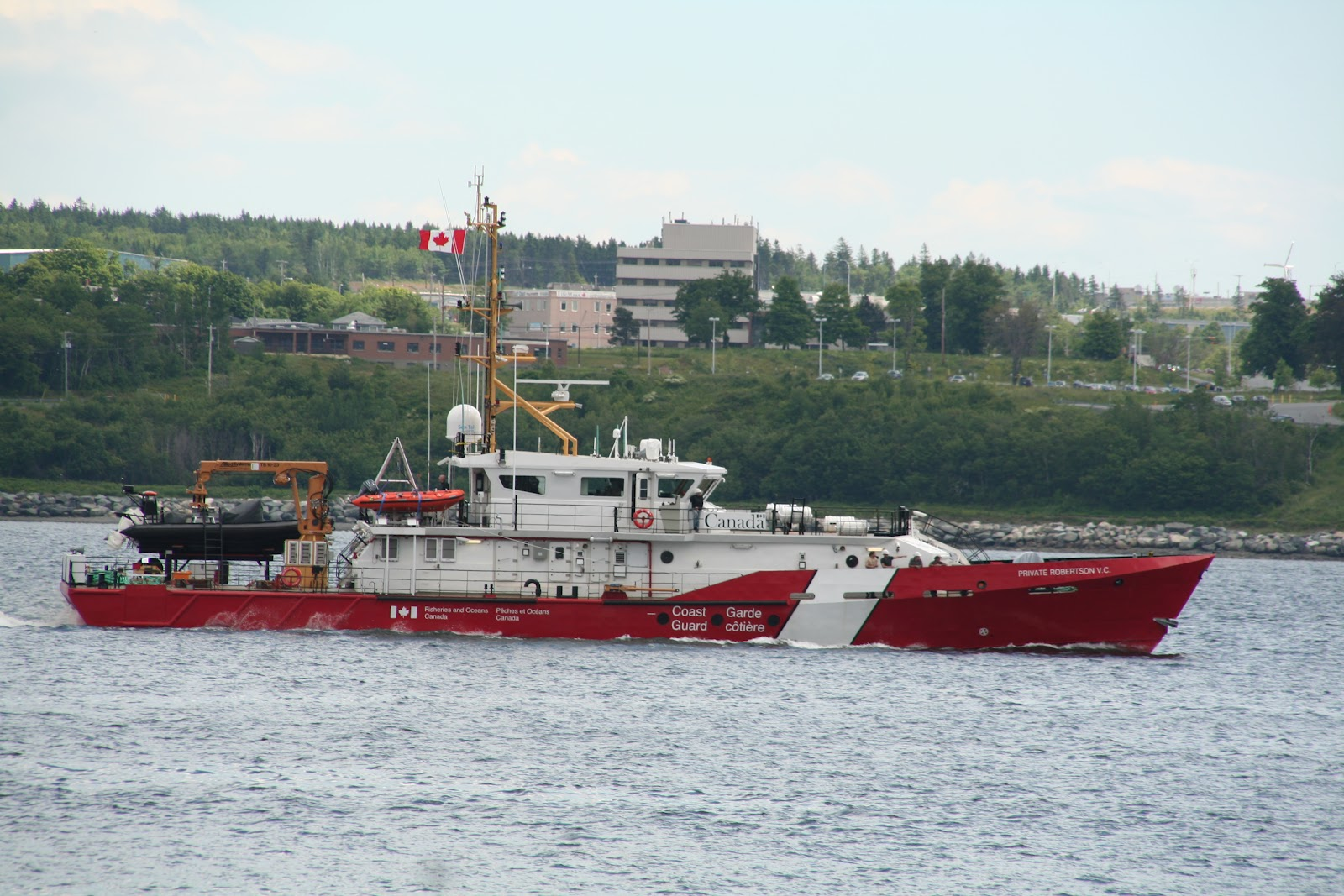
Canadian Coast Guard patrol vessel CCGS Private Robertson V.C.

Vessels of this type have been supplied to, or ordered by a number of countries. As of December 2011 thirty five vessels had been built. Many of the agencies that employ these vessels have them delivered without armament, or solely with small arms. They are equipped with water cannon. Many of the agencies that employ these vessels specified they should be equipped with a stern launching ramp, capable of launching and retrieving a 7.9-metre (26 ft) pursuit craft (RHIB) while underway. The vessels are equipped with a horizontal thruster in their bows, to aid maneuvering in tight conditions, such as mooring in crowded anchorages. The ships are well known for their sea handling capabilities and comfort. Many are powered by Caterpillar engines.

Nation	Date	Quantity	Type	Notes
Netherlands Antilles & Aruba	1998	3	4100	Jaguar, Panter and Poema employed by the Netherlands Antilles & Aruba Coast Guard.
Netherlands	2001	2	4207	In 2001 the Netherlands ordered two vessels to serve in the Dutch customs' service. Visarend commissioned in 2001, Zeearend in 2002. now operated by the Dutch Coast Guard
United Kingdom	2001	4	4207	the UKBA 42m Customs Cutters Seeker, Searcher, Vigilant and Valiant were operated by the UK Border Agency with responsibility potentially now being passed to Border Force.
South Africa	2004	3	4708	Lillian Ngoyi class: Lillian Ngoyi, Ruth First and Victoria Mxenge are employed by the Department of Environment, Forestry and Fisheries.
Vietnam	2004	3	4100	SAR-411 (based at Hải Phòng MRCC), SAR-412 (based at Đà Nẵng MRCC) and SAR-413 (based at Vũng Tàu MRCC) employed by Vietnam Maritime search and Rescue Coordination Center (VN MRCC).
Vietnam	2004	3	2606	SAR-272 (based at Vũng Tàu MRCC), SAR-273 (based at Hải Phòng MRCC) and SAR-274 (based at Đà Nẵng MRCC) employed by Vietnam Maritime search and Rescue Coordination Center
Jamaica	2005	3	4207	The three vessels which form the County class are HMJS Surrey, HMJS Cornwall and HMJS Middlesex. They were built in the Netherlands, and the last vessel was delivered in December 2006 and traded in with Damen in 2016 and transferred to Nicaraguan Coast Guard in 2018
Barbados	2007	3	4207	Built for the Barbados Coast Guard. HMBS Leonard C Banfield and HMBS Rudyard Lewis were scheduled to be delivered in 2008. HMBS Trident was scheduled for delivery in 2009.
Albania	2007	4	4207	Iliria and three other vessels: Oriku, Lisus and Butrinti operated by the Albanian Coast Guard
Canada	2009	9	4207	In 2009 the Department of Fisheries and Oceans announced it would be purchasing 9 patrol vessels for the Canadian Coast Guard. The Hero class began entering service in 2011.
Bulgaria	2010	1	4207	The Bulgaria Border Police accepted delivery of Obzor on July 16, 2010.
United States	2011	58	4708	The United States Coast Guard (USCG) commenced the purchase of 58 cutters designated as the 154 ft (46.9 m) Sentinel class. In September 2008, Bollinger Shipyards in Louisiana, USA, was awarded US$88 million to build the prototype lead ship of class. It was launched in April 2011 as USCGC Bernard C. Webber. By July 2014, the USCG had exercised options with Bollinger Shipyards for construction through 2017 of additional Sentinel-class Fast Response Cutters (FRC), bringing the total number of FRCs under contract with Bollinger to 58.
Mexico	2012	10	4207	The Mexican Navy – Armada de México – inducted the first two of several Tenochtitlan-class vessels in 2012. The two Stan Patrol 4207 patrol boats – ARM Tenochtitlan (PC-331) and ARM Teotihuacan (PC-332) were built at a cost of US$9 million each at ASTIMAR 1 in Tampico, Tamaulipas and completed in April and May 2012. A seventh vessel was ordered in September 2014. Three more were ordered in January 2016.
Cape Verde	2012	1	5009	One Guardiao (P511)
Honduras	2013	2	4207	Honduran Navy 2 patrol vessels 4207 (FNH 1401 Lempira and FNH 1402 Morazan) and 6 Damen Interceptor 1102 in service 2013
Bahamas	2013	4	4207	The Royal Bahamas Defence Force ordered four vessels together with four Stan Patrol 3007 Patrols and one Stan Lander 5612 Logistics Support and Landing Craft in April 2013.
Italy	2013	2	5509	The Guardia di Finanza naval service commissioned two vessels to Cantiere Navale Vittoria (Rovigo) on Damen 5509 plans.
Mexico	2014	1	5009	Fast Crew Supplier ordered in September 2014 together with a seventh Stan Patrol 4207.
Venezuela	2014	6	4207	The Bolivarian Armada of Venezuela ordered six vessels together with six Damen Ocean Patrol 5007 in March 2014. They are being built in UCOCAR with the assistance of DAMEN Shipbuilding & Engineering, Cuba.
Venezuela	2014	6	5009	The Bolivarian Armada of Venezuela ordered six vessels together with six Damen Stan Patrol 4207 in March 2014. They are being built in UCOCAR with the assistance of DAMEN Shipbuilding & Engineering, Cuba.
Qatar	2014	6	5009	The Qatar Armed Forces ordered six vessels together with one 52-metre (171 ft) diving support vessel on March 31, 2014. The vessels are to be built by Nakilat Damen Shipyard Qatar
Ecuador	2014	2	5009	Isla San Cristóbal (LG-30) and Isla Isabela (LG-31), ordered for the Ecuadorion Coast Guard in addition to four operational Damen Stan Patrol 2606 vessels.
Trinidad and Tobago	2015	4	5009	Following a 4-year acquisition programme the Government of Trinidad and Tobago agreed to purchase twelve vessels from Damen including four 5009s
Greece	2016	1	5509	The Hellenic Coast Guard inaugurated LS090, a Damen 5509 vessel.
Jamaica	2016	2	4207	County class are HMJS Cornwall and HMJS Middlesex.
South Africa	2018	3	6211	Multi Mission Inshore Patrol Vessels as part of Project Biro - Build by Damen South Africa.
Nicaragua	2018	2	4207	Build in 2005 ex Jamaican Coast Guard
Jamaica	2020	3	4207	Two addition ships ordered of the County class replacing HMJS Fort Charles and HMJS Paul Bogle.
Jamaica	2020	1	5009	Honour class
Italy	2022	1	6009	P04 Osum. Built for the Guardia di Finanza naval service. Hybrid diesel-electric propulsion.
Netherlands	2026	3	5009	In March 2026 the Dutch Ministry of Defence signed a contract with Damen for the delivery of three Damen Stan Patrol (DSP) 5009 vessels. They will replace the three DSP 4100 vessels which have served in the Dutch Caribbean Coast Guard (DCCG) since the 1990s. The new vessels are expected to enter into service of the DCCG in 2029.

A 5009 vessel MY Ocean Warrior was also built for Sea Shepherd Conservation Society in 2015–2016.

== See also ==
- List of naval ship classes in service
- Holland-class offshore patrol vessel - A larger patrol vessel that can operate offshore.
