= Cornwall (ship) =

Several ships have been named Cornwall, for Cornwall:

- Cornwall (1794 ship) was launched as a West Indiaman. In a little more than three years later she had left on the first of three whaling voyages to the Southern Whale Fishery. On her first whaling voyage she captured a Spanish ship and fought off a French privateer. After her third whaling voyage Cornwall returned to the West Indies trade. Around 1817 new owners sent her to India where a Parsi merchant purchased her. She traded in the Persian Gulf and the Indian Ocean, and also participated as a transport in a naval expedition to the Persian Gulf. She was last listed in 1824.
- Cornwall (1798 ship) was launched in Whitby in 1798 or 1799 as a West Indiaman. Between 1817 and 1819 she made two voyages to Bengal, sailing under a licence from the British East India Company (EIC). She made a third voyage, this time in 1825, to Bombay. The last readily accessible reports of her movements have her returning to Liverpool from Demerara in early 1827.
- Cornwall (1810 ship) was launched at Calcutta. She participated as a transport in two military campaigns some 40 plus years apart. In between, she made four voyages for the British East India Company (EIC), carried assisted immigrants from England to Sydney, and transported convicts to Tasmania. She was wrecked at Mauritius in July 1858.

== See also ==
- HMJS Cornwall - ships of the Jamaica Defence Force
- HMS Cornwall – one of seven vessels of the Royal Navy
