= Lillian Ngoyi =

South African anti-apartheid activist (1911–1980)

Lillian Matabane Ngoyi
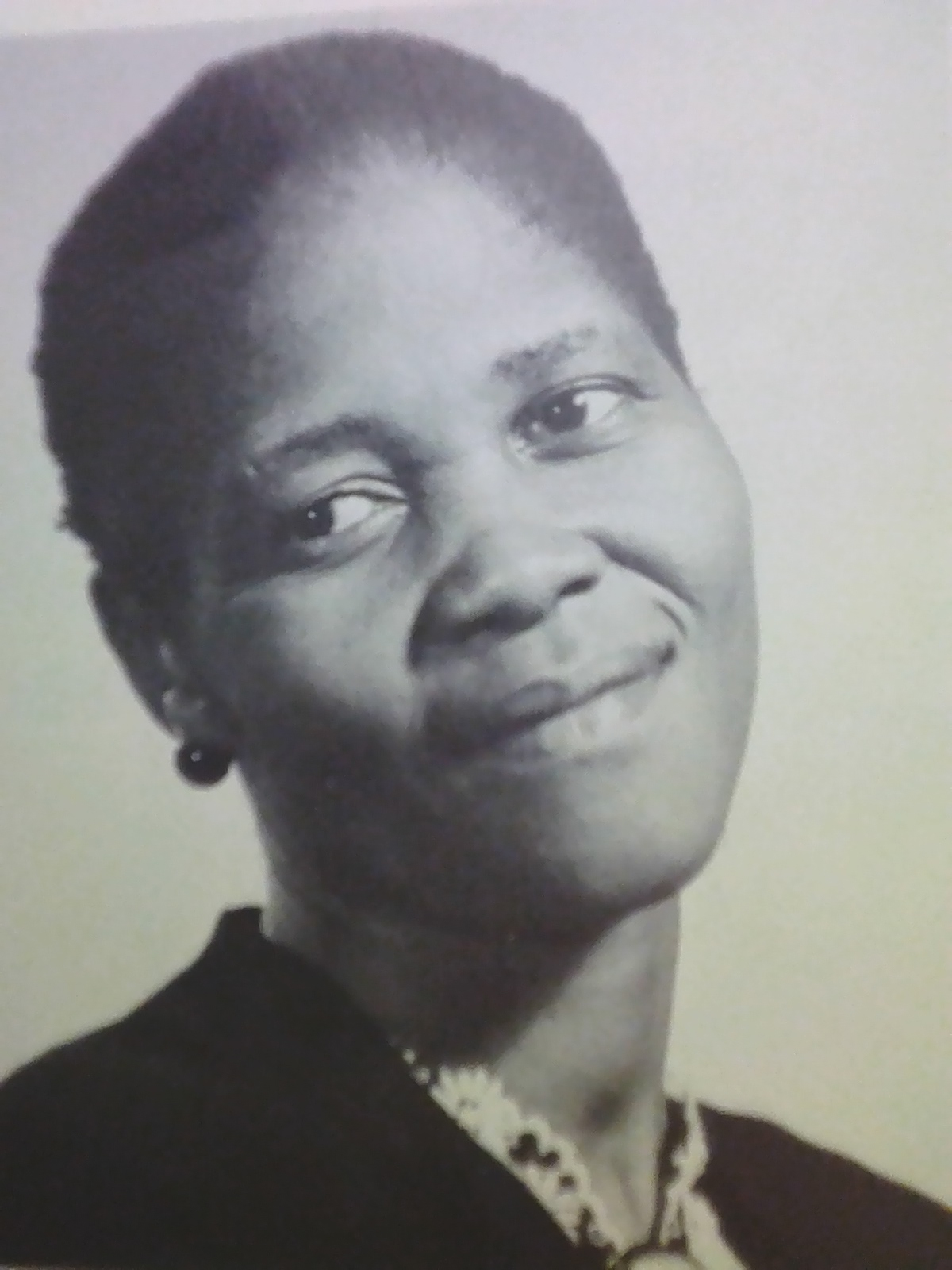
- Born: Lilian Masediba Matabane; 25 September 1911; Pretoria, Gauteng
- Died: 13 March 1980 (aged 68); Gauteng
- Other name: Ma Ngoyi
- Occupation: Activist
- Known for: Fighting Apartheid, Women's rights

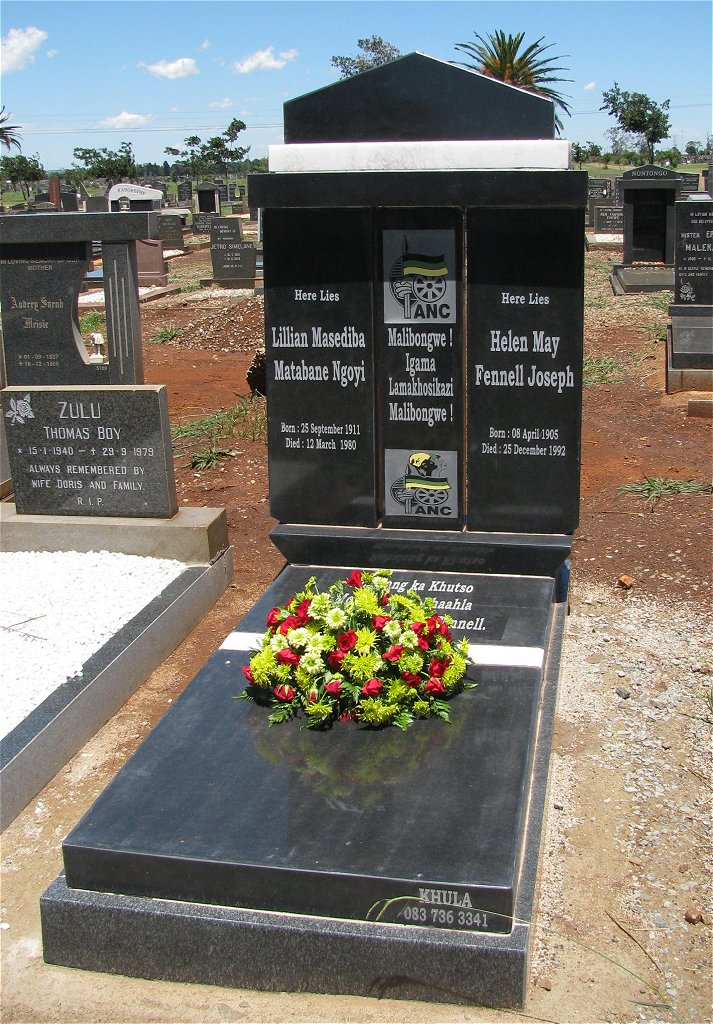
Grave of Lillian Ngoyi in the Avalon Cemetery

Lillian Masediba Matabane Ngoyi, "Ma Ngoyi", OMSG (25 September 1911 – 13 March 1980) was a South African anti-apartheid activist. She was the first woman elected to the executive committee of the African National Congress, and helped launch the Federation of South African Women.

Prior to becoming a machinist at a textile mill, where she was employed from 1945 to 1956, Ngoyi enrolled to become a nurse. Lillian Ngoyi started formal resistance in Pretoria at age 41 as a foot soldier in the 1952 Defiance Campaign, which was developed by the ANC and South African Indian Congress (SAIC), and the leaders of the multi-racial coalition known as the Congress Alliance. The Defiance Campaign was launched in 6 April, during the three hundred year anniversary of the Initial Dutch settlement.

== First role in activism ==
During her time of resistance Ngoyi joined a friend in volunteer train ins that August for the non-violent protest strategies called satyagraha which was conceived by former South African activist Mohandas Gandhi. This form of passive resistance campaign was intended to instruct volunteers in how to contest under South Africa's Urban Areas Act, and expand to pass rules under the Natives Act.

== Early life ==
Ngoyi was born in Bloed Street, Pretoria. She was the only daughter of Annie and Isaac Matabane, and three brothers, Lawrence, George and Percy. Her grandfather, on her mother's side, was Johannes Mphahlele, a member of the royal Mphahlele household, who became a Methodist evangelist, working alongside Samuel Mathabathe. Ngoyi's family's presence in the capital can be partly attributed to her maternal grandfather. A trailblazing Methodist minister who appears in many historical accounts of African evangelism. His background was very important to Ngoyi because of the personal influence that it had on her at a young age, but also traditions contributed to urbanization and breaking ethic ties. Ngoyi's mother worked as a washerwoman and her father was a mineworker. Ngoyi attended Kilnerton Primary School until Standard Two.

In 1928, she moved to Johannesburg to train as a nurse at City Deep Mine Hospital, and completed three years of training in general nursing. Within this time period Johannesburg was rapidly expanding into an urban centre of the Rand. The more established the Pretoria had become the administrative capital of the Union during the year before Ngoyi's birth, which her parents (second-generation urbanites) were amongst the 17,000 plus Africans settling in 1911. This population of people have more experiences in comparison to other populations along the Rand, that being other rural communities. Ngoyi's beginning's were, relatively speaking, urban.

During this time, she met and married a van driver, John Gerard Ngoyi, in 1934. They had a daughter, Edith Ngoyi. Lillian's husband died in a motor car accident in 1937, after which she became a seamstress, working both from home and in garment factories at various times. From the 1950s onwards, she lived in Orlando, Soweto, with her mother and her children.

== Political activism ==
Having been drawn into politics via her work in the Garment Workers' Union of South Africa in the 1940s, Ngoyi first joined the African National Congress (ANC) as an associate member during the 1952 Defiance Campaign. Lillian became a well-known figure at Congress meetings. She was an amazing public speaker who was never afraid to speak her mind. She could make her audience feel things similar to her passion for the social regarding apartheid and women's rights. Her life had become a whirlwind of meetings, speeches, and organizing as she took on various roles in the FEDSAW and being treasurer of the Council of Non-European Trade Unions. Ngoyi would train in the non-violent protest strategies of Satyagraha to resist the Urban Area's Act, and the expanded pass system of the Natives Act. Ngoyi joined the ANC Women's League in 1952; she was at that stage a widow with children and an elderly mother to support, and worked as a seamstress. A year later she was elected as President of the Women's League. In 1954, she helped to found the Federation of South African Women (FEDSAW) and was elected to the national executive of the ANC; she was the first woman to be elected to national office in the organisation.

== Turning point in career ==
In 1955, an event occurred that changed Lillians' outlook on life in a realist way. She was elected as a delegate to attend the World Congress of Mothers, which was held by the Women's International Democratic Federation (WIDF). This conference was held in Lausanne in Switzerland, and also gave opportunity for delegates of the WIDF to tour several countries. Although this was in fact a once in a lifetime opportunity, Lillian was ''listed" as unable to obtain a passport because she was a member of a trade union and the ANC. Lillian went through trial and error to find safe passage in to Switzerland. Eventually, without delay she was driven by car to Johannesburg then Swaziland and managed to get on an airplane to the conference. Lillians' journey around the world took her to Uganda, Rome, Germany, and China where she experienced various culture with vast amounts of different people. On 9 August 1956, Ngoyi led a women's march along with Helen Joseph. Lillian Ngoyi befriended Helen Joseph and they both became lifelong friends through their work as anti-apartheid activists. Rahima Moosa, Sophia De Bruyn, Motlalepula Chabaku, Bertha Gxowa and Albertina Sisulu of 20,000 women to the Union Buildings of Pretoria in protest against the apartheid government requiring women to carry passbooks as part of the pass laws. Ngoyi would command the crowd to be in complete silence for 30 minutes. This march remains the largest women's demonstration in the history of South Africa.

Following the women's march, the apartheid police began arresting anti-apartheid activists accused of treason for the beginning of the Treason Trials. Among the 19 women arrested was Ngoyi who shared a jail cell with Helen Joseph. This became an interesting period of time because in long term political prison sentences the separation of black and white prisoners was well known.

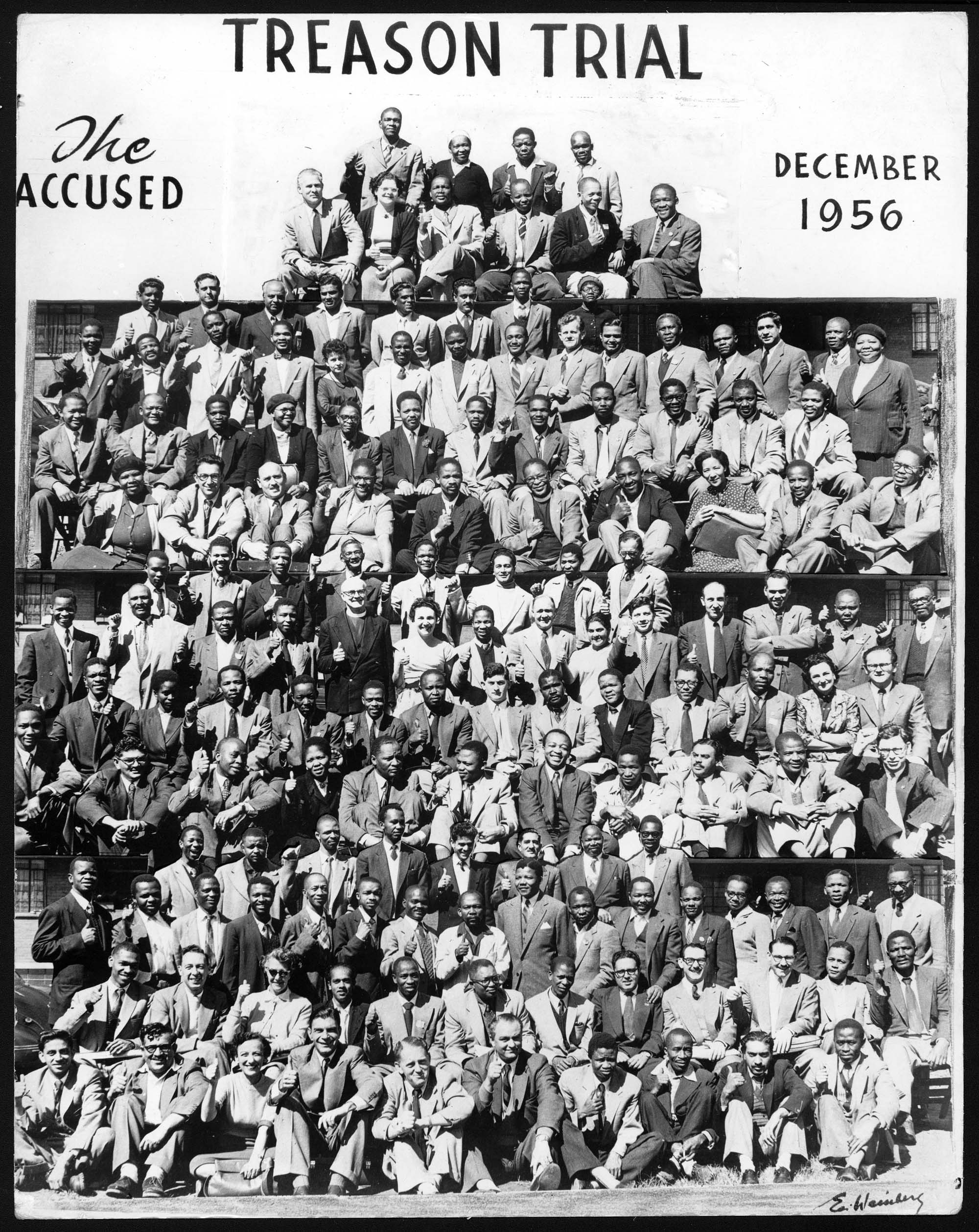
Defendants of the 1956 Treason Trial including Lillian Ngoyi

Lillian Ngoyi was also a transnational figure who recognised the potential influence that international support could have on the struggle against apartheid and the emancipation of black women. With this in mind she had, in 1955, embarked on an illegal journey to Lausanne, Switzerland, in order to participate in the World Congress of Mothers held by the Women's International Democratic Federation (WIDF). Accompanied by her fellow activist Dora Tamana, and as an official delegate of FEDSAW, she embarked on a journey that would see an attempt to stow away on a boat leaving Cape Town under "white names", defy (with the help of a sympathetic pilot) segregated seating on a plane bound for London and gain entry to Britain under the pretext of completing her course in Bible studies. She would visit England, Germany, Switzerland, Romania, China and Russia, meeting women leaders often engaged in left-wing politics, before arriving back in South Africa a wanted woman.

Ngoyi would periodically lead ANC rallies against passes and on larger protests of issues in Pretoria. Ngoyi would continue to unite women, leading the third FSW conference in 1961, telling the women that "Freedom does not come walking towards you - it must be won. As women we must go on playing our part." Ngoyi was schooled in the history of the women's fight for free movement in their countries. In leading the 1956 women's march, this lead her to draw more women from all areas and walks of life, including leaders with educated backgrounds; who could take on organizational responsibilities and support the mass number of economically deprived women throughout South Africa and beyond.

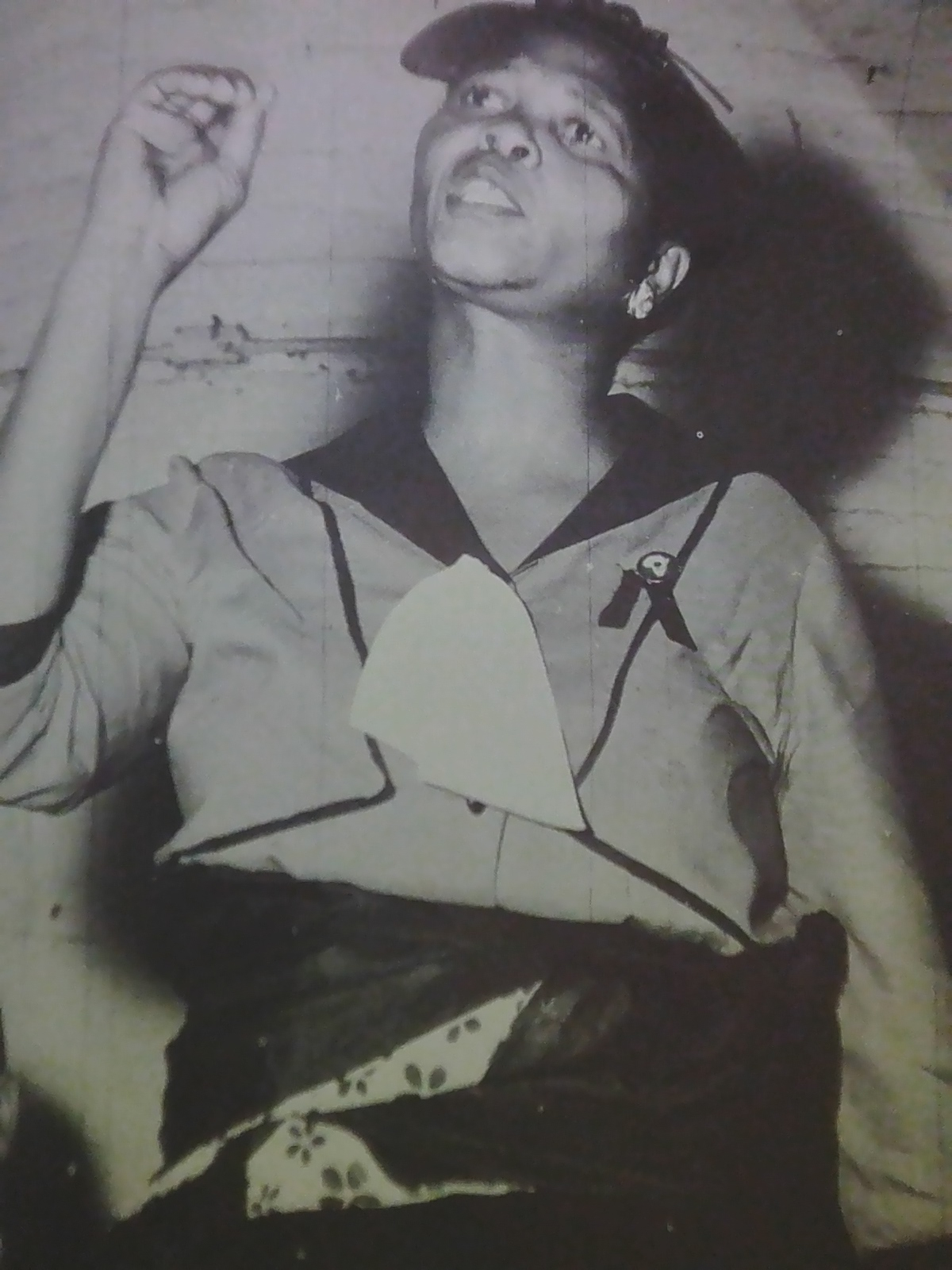
Lillian Ngoyi gives an oration at Ida Mntwana's funeral

Ngoyi was known as a strong orator and a fiery inspiration to many of her colleagues in the ANC. She was among the 156 Treason Trialists arrested in December 1956, and was finally acquitted of the charges against her in 1960. She was rearrested more than once in the early 1960s, and spent 71 days in solitary confinement in 1963. Ngoyi spent a total of 15 years living under three five-year banning orders, which included restrictions that confined her to her home in Orlando, Soweto, and prevented her from meeting any other banned persons. Additional conditions of the banning orders included being forbidden to attend public gatherings, make speeches or be quoted; even at her own home, she was not permitted to be with more than one person at the same time. The first two banning orders were imposed in 1962 and 1967, and when the second banning order expired in 1972, she was able to meet colleagues and friends again, and travelled to Durban and Cape Town. She would travel to Robben Island to visit ANC contemporary Nelson Mandela in prison, where Mandela would commend her leadership in various organisations. In 1975, a banning order against her was imposed again; however, this time its conditions did allow her some communication with the outside world. In the last decade of Ngoyi’s life, she would have to depend on gifts from friends and contemporaries to survive.

== Influence on urban life and activism ==
Scholars have long emphasized the influence of urbanization within South Africa on the subject of apartheid. In connection with Lillian Ngoyi's early life it reveals, the mission of rural black South Africans in towns and cities that have been concern about the conditions of apartheid for some time. Ngoyi's urban roots and upbringing had a crucial impact on her experiences, which shaped her outlook on activism and led her to become one of the leaders of the women's movement in the 1950's. Women's roles in leadership were largely excluded from the formal leadership structure, which reflected in their participation politics and says more about men's patriarchal attitudes than women's contributions. In the mid-1940s and today, the rate of women living in urban areas increased, women were faced with a various challenges connected to housing shortages, high living costs, forced removals and poor living conditions. As well as limits on employment and restrictions on mobility. In response to this adversity, the women in these conditions formed alliances such as the Eastern Cape Zenzele club (formed in the late 1920s).

== Awards ==
Lillian Ngoyi was the first woman to be elected to the National Executive of the African National Congress. She was also the first woman to receive the highest award of the liberation movement, which was Isitwalandwe. To those who knew Lillian Ngoyi this award was not only for a courageous woman, but also for the outstanding contribution made by women participants particularly, during the past three decades, to the liberation struggle at all virtues.

== Memorials and honours ==
The Koos Beukes Clinic at the Chris Hani Baragwanath Hospital in Soweto has been renamed Lillian Ngoyi Community Clinic in her honour.

On 16 November 2004, the South African Ministry of the Environment launched the lead ship in a class of environmental patrol vessels named Lillian Ngoyi in her honour.

On 9 August 2006, the 50th anniversary of the march on Pretoria, Strijdom Square from which the women marched was renamed Lillian Ngoyi Square. 9 August is commemorated in South Africa as Women's Day.

In 2009, a residence hall at Rhodes University was renamed in her honour.

In 2012, Van der Walt Street in Pretoria was renamed Lillian Ngoyi Street. Other roads in Cape Town, Thembisa, Berea, Durban, and Hartbeesfontein have been named in her honour.

The City of Johannesburg decided to honour Mme Lillian Masediba Ngoyi by renaming the Bree Street in Johannesburg after her in 2014 – the street named Lillian Ngoyi Street.
