= Joint Interagency Task Force South =

Unified military command and control of drug interdiction activities

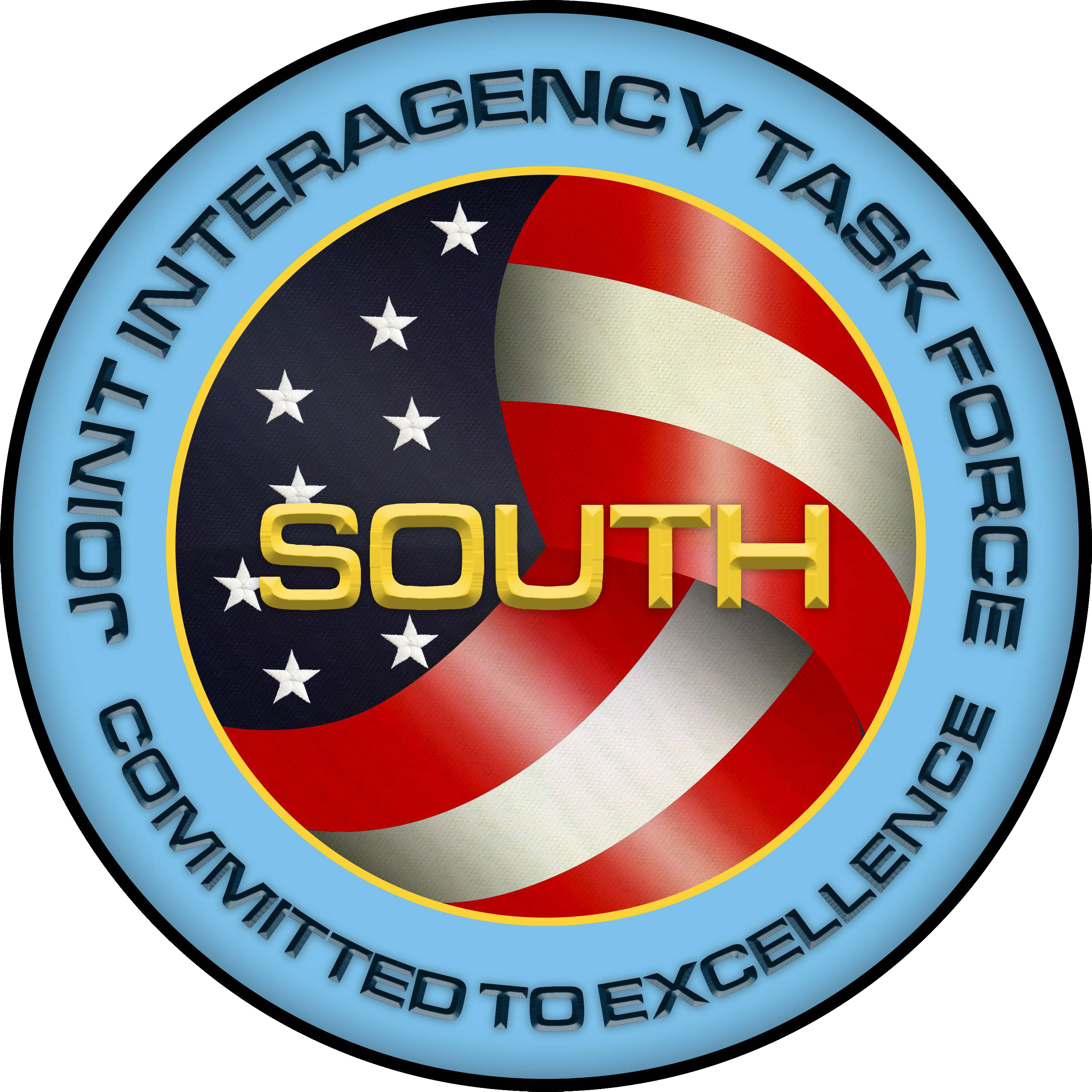
- Emblem of Joint Interagency Task Force South
- Founded: February 22, 1989
- Allegiance: United States
- Type: Joint task force
- Part of: United States Southern Command
- Garrison/HQ: Naval Air Station Key West, Florida
- Nicknames: JIATFS, JIATF-S
- Engagements: War on drugs; War on cartels

Commanders
- Director: Rear Admiral Jeffrey K. Randall, USCG
- Deputy Director: Rear Admiral Jeffrey A. Jurgemeyer, USN
- Chief of Staff: Col. Matt Lesnowicz, USMC

Joint Interagency Task Force South (JIATFS) is a United States multiservice, multiagency task force based at Naval Air Station Key West (Truman Annex), Key West, Florida.

It conducts counter illicit trafficking operations, intelligence fusion and multi-sensor correlation to detect, monitor, and hand off suspected illicit trafficking targets; promotes security cooperation and coordinates country team and partner nation initiatives in order to defeat the flow of illicit traffic.

JIATF South is a subordinate command to United States Southern Command and is commanded by a Coast Guard Flag Officer.

== History ==
In response to a need for unified command and control of drug interdiction activities, the FY 1989 National Defense Authorization Act designated the Department of Defense as the lead agency for the detection and monitoring program targeted against the aerial and maritime traffic attempting to bring drugs into the United States. Commander Joint Task Force FOUR (CJTF-4) in Key West, Commander, Joint Task Force FIVE in Alameda, California, and Commander, Joint Task Force 6 in El Paso, Texas, were established to direct the anti-drug surveillance efforts in the Atlantic/Caribbean, Pacific, and Mexico border areas respectively. The Joint Task Forces have been operating since October 1989.

The Joint Task Force 4 operations center received radar data from the AN/FPS-118 Over-the-horizon radar located at Moscow Air Force Station, Maine, until the system was turned off and placed in "warm storage" after the end of the Cold War.

Bill Clinton's Presidential Decision Directive 14 of 3 October 1993 led to a reorganisation of U.S. military anti-drug organization. On 7 April 1994, Dr. Lee P. Brown, Director of the Office of National Drug Control Policy, signed the National Interdiction Command and Control Plan which directed establishment of three national interagency task forces (JIATF East in Key West, Florida; JIATF South in Panama; and JIATF West in Alameda, California).

On 1 June 1997, the Commander in Chief of the U.S. Southern Command expanded his area of responsibility to include the Caribbean and the waters bordering South America, and assumed command and control of JIATF East. In compliance with the 1979 Panama Canal Treaty and the necessity to complete the military drawdown in Panama by the end of 1999, the decision was made to merge JIATF South and JIATF East into one organization. Transfer of the JIATF South mission to the merged JIATF was completed on 1 May 1999.

Due to the previous history of the command, Task Groups 4.1, 4.2, 4.3, and 4.4, and others, are in use controlling U.S. and allied assets assigned to JIATF South. In February 2007, a Dutch magazine described the relationships as follows: under the command of the Director JIATF South, the U.S. Tactical Commander held the position of Commander Task Group 4.1, United States Air Force forces CTG 4.2, US Navy forces CTG 4.3, the Director of the Dutch Caribbean Coast Guard (DCCG), who is always the commander of the Dutch Navy in the Caribbean area (CZMCARIB), Commander Task Group 4.4 (CTG 4.4), and US Customs force CTG 4.5. Since 2008 an additional Task Group known as CTG 4.6 has been commanded by the French Navy Commander (Antilles).

== Current leadership ==
Director: Rear Admiral Jeff Randall, USCG
Deputy director: Rear Admiral Joshua Lasky, USN
Chief of staff: Colonel Matt Lesnowicz, USMC
Director of Intelligence & Security: Captain Joseph "Joey" Harrison, USN
Director for Operations:
Command master chief: CMC Michael V. Farrell, USCG

== International cooperation ==
Twenty countries have liaison officers based at JIATF-S. These include, Argentina, Brazil, Canada, Chile, Colombia, Costa Rica, Dominican Republic, Ecuador, El Salvador, France, Guatemala, Honduras, Jamaica, Mexico, the Netherlands, Panama, Peru, Spain, Trinidad and Tobago and the United Kingdom.
