= Damen Stan Patrol 3307 =

The Damen Group has designed and sold the Damen Stan Patrol 3307 -- part of its family of Damen Stan Patrol vessels of different sizes.

== Design ==
The vessels employ an axe-bow, a new design that Damen claims improves seakeeping. The bow's leading edge is vertical, where most ships have a diagonal leading edge. The diagonal leading edge causes the bow to have more buoyancy when struck by a big wave, which increases the vessel's tendency to pitch and yaw. The model 3307 is 33 metres (108 ft) long and 7 metres (23 ft) wide.

The patrol vessel design is based on an earlier fast crew delivery vessel, commonly employed servicing offshore oil platforms.

== Operators ==
image	operator	first delivery	number ordered	notes
	Homeland Integrated Offshore Services		6	These privately owned patrol vessels will not mount any deck guns, but their crew will include heavily armed guards.; They will patrol Nigeria's offshore and littoral oil fields.; The vessels' bridges are bullet-proof, and, internally, there is another armored room for passengers to take refuge in, during an attack.
	South African Navy		3	Ordered to counter smuggling and illegal fishing.
