= Dutch Caribbean Coast Guard =

Dutch Caribbean Coast Guard Kustwacht Caribisch Gebied
- Badge of KWCARIB

- Racing Stripe
- Abbreviation: KWCARIB
- Motto: Samen Sterk; Strong Together

Agency overview
- Formed: February 1, 1996
- Annual budget: €48,269,000

Jurisdictional structure
- Operations jurisdiction: Dutch Caribbean
- Constituting instrument: Rijkswet Kustwacht (Coast Guard Act)
- Specialist jurisdiction: Coastal patrol, marine border protection, marine search and rescue

Operational structure
- Overseen by: Kustwachtcommissie (Coast Guard Commission)
- Parent agency: Ministry of Defence

Website
- www.kustwacht.org

The Dutch Caribbean Coast Guard (DCCG) (Dutch: Kustwacht Caribisch Gebied (KWCARIB)) is the coast guard of the Kingdom of the Netherlands in the Dutch Caribbean. The unit is a joint effort of all constituent countries within the Kingdom. Prior to the dissolution of the Netherlands Antilles in 2010, it was known as the Netherlands Antilles and Aruba Coast Guard (NA&A CG) and was a division of the Royal Netherlands Navy.

== Tasks ==
- Detection and control: drugs, border control, customs control at sea, fisheries and environmental surveillance and monitoring of safe shipping.
- Services: continuous occupation and Rescue Coordination Center (RCC), handling of maritime distress and safety radio communications, search and rescue (SAR) and supporting maritime contingency.

To perform these tasks the coast guard sometimes works together with units and personnel of the United States via the Joint Interagency Task Force South.

== Organization ==
DCCG is a partnership between Aruba, Sint Maarten, Curaçao, and the Netherlands. The staff of the Coast Guard is composed of all constituent countries. DCCG is a Kingdom organization directly under the State Council of Ministers of the Kingdom. The Commander of the Naval Forces of the Royal Netherlands Navy in the Caribbean (CZMCARIB) is also the director of DCCG.

== Policy ==
Ministries from the four parts of the kingdom determine the policy of the Coast Guard. To streamline policy formulation the Coast Guard's Commission has been formed. This committee consists of officials from different ministries. The Coast Guard Commission also ensures budgets and annual reports. The judicial policy of the Coast Guard is determined by the three Ministers of Justice of the countries of the Kingdom. Controlling the Coast Guard executive in judicial matters is done through the Prosecutors-General of Aruba, Curaçao, St Maarten, and the Netherlands. The Secretary of Defense is on behalf of the State Ministers in charge of managing and controlling DCCG.

== Coast Guard support centers ==
DCCG has three Coast Guard support centers: on Aruba, Curaçao and Sint Maarten. From here, the Coast Guard patrol boats patrol in the waters around the islands. The flying units of the Coast Guard are stationed at Coast Guard Air Station Hato, Curaçao. The Maritime Operation Center / RCC itself is located in Curaçao, at the Parera naval base.

== Units ==
DCCG has its own units and also makes use of defense resources (mainly from the RNLN, a ship and staff). DCCG has several private owned types of patrol boats, cutters and aircraft.

=== Cutters ===
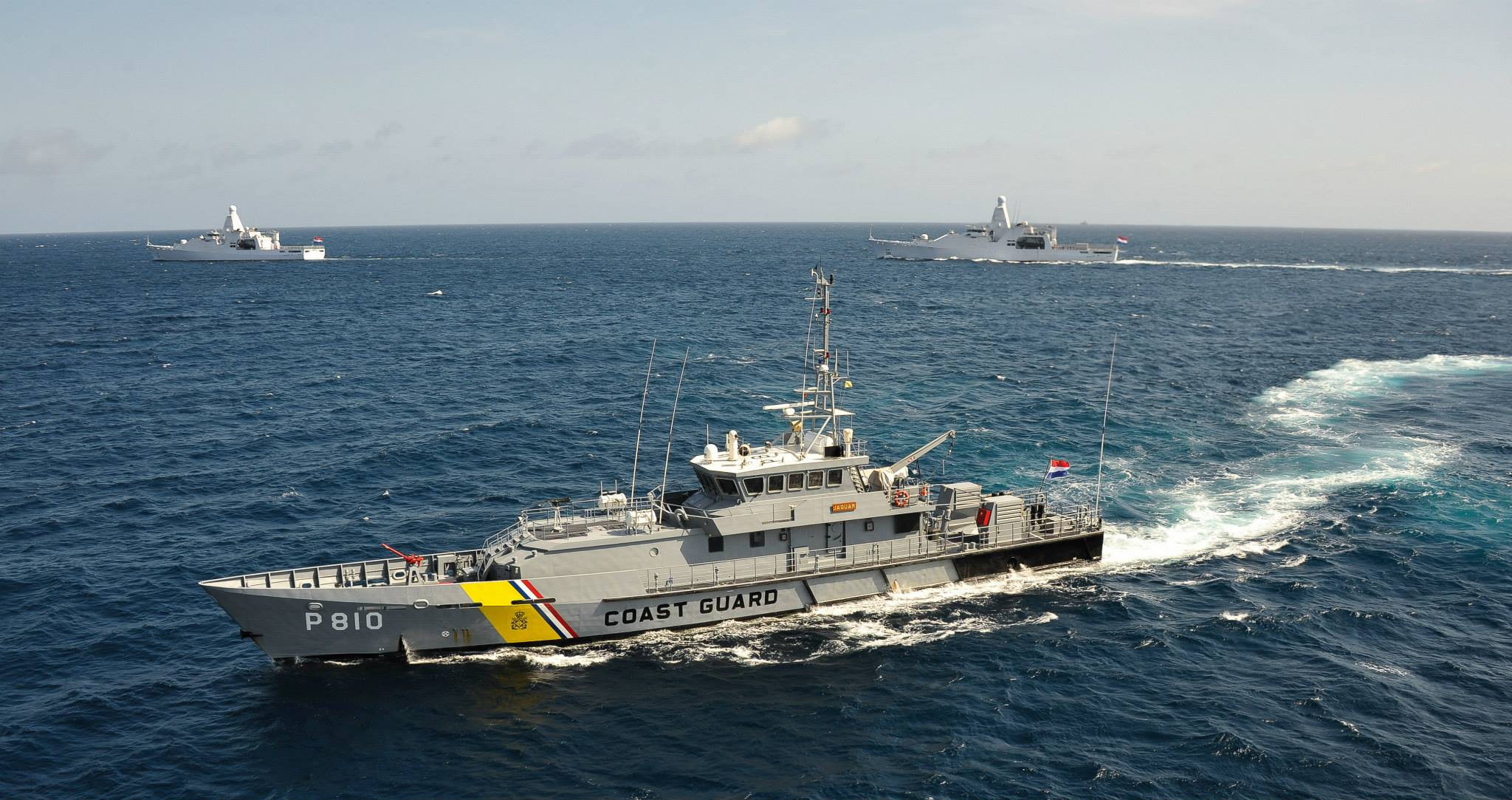
The Dutch Caribbean Coast Guard cutter Jaguar with two Holland-class offshore patrol vessels in the background

The three Coast Guard cutters, the JAGUAR, the PANTER and POEMA, are Damen Stan 4100 patrol vessels. They are designed for service in the coastal waters of the Caribbean islands. The cutters are suitable for carrying out all coast guard tasks. With the onboard RHIB, boarding operations can be performed. The cutter is over 41 metres (135 ft) long, has a crew of eleven and a speed exceeding 26 knots (48 km/h).

Each boat has radar, infrared cameras, night vision binoculars, an ion scanner, a fixed 12.7 mm machine gun and a rotatable water cannon. Furthermore, they are equipped with photographic and video equipment to collect evidence. In February 2026 it was reported that DCCG will acquire three new cutters based on the Damen Stan Patrol FCS5009 design to be delivered in 2028 supplemented with 4 Damen Fast Intercepters 1102 able to reach speeds in excess of 50 knots. The three new coast guard cutters will be larger than their predecessors and have more modern sensors.

=== METAL SHARK 38 DEFIANTS ===
The company Metal Shark builds special ships for military and police purposes, and the 38 Defiant is the name of the type that is being used. The twelve Metal Sharks are an interception vessel which is used to patrol the territorial waters. They have a slip cabin and a completely closed wheelhouse, which protects the coast guard during all weather conditions, providing them with an unobstructed view day & night.

=== AgustaWestland AW139 ===
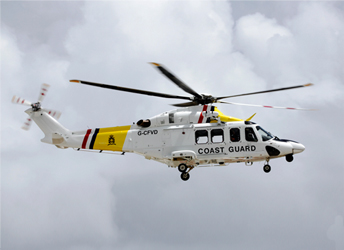
An AW139 from the Dutch Caribbean Coast Guard

The DCCG employs two AgustaWestland AW139 helicopters for high speed chase, and search and rescue operations. The AgustaWestland AW139 helicopters are stationed at Coast Guard Air Station Hato and will be replaced by AgustaWestland AW189 rotorcraft. These helicopters are operated on a long-term contract basis by the Bristow Helicopters division of the Bristow Group, a worldwide commercial helicopter operator.

=== Bombardier Dash 8 ===
Since the autumn of 2007, the DCCG has two Bombardier Dash 8 Maritime Patrol Aircraft (designated MPA-D8). These planes are built to the specific needs of DCCG, based on required Coast Guard tasks such as search and rescue, and fisheries and environmental monitoring. These two Dash 8 turboprop aircraft are equipped with modern day and night capabilities in order to obtain optimal results in the performance of their duties. These resources include specially designed hatches for dropping life rafts and drift / marker buoys, a high power searchlight in the nose of the aircraft with the aim to see and be seen in search situations, radar, and a communication and interlink software system. All these resources make the Dash 8 an ideal airplane in a coordinating role between various units and the RCC. Besides these functions, both Dash 8s can be deployed before, during and after hurricane passages to move people and resources to those areas that need help. For these missions, the Dash 8s can be converted into transport aircraft configurations.

=== West Indies Guard Ship ===
The West Indies Guard Ship (WIGS) is a ship of the Royal Netherlands Navy that rotates about every six months. It can be a frigate but more commonly one of the Navy's Holland-class offshore patrol vessels is deployed to the region. This vessel usually carries an NHIndustries NH90 helicopter for search and rescue tasks and pursuit of suspect vessels.

A special boarding team from the U.S. Coast Guard can be embarked on board the WIGS, authorized to carry out boardings beyond the territorial waters of the Dutch Caribbean islands. This cooperation between Aruba, Curaçao, the Netherlands, Sint Maarten, the United States, and other actors is formalized in the Joint Interagency Task Force South, situated in Key West, Florida, United States.

== Personnel ==
DCCG has approximately 240 personnel. Of these, 205 come from Aruba, Curaçao, Bonaire, Sint Maarten, Saba and St. Eustatius and 25 from the Royal Netherlands Navy. These consist mostly of personnel actually deployed to carry out operations and the occupation of the Coast Guard bases. In addition, there are about 30 employees who staff the Operations Center / RCC 24 hours a day.

=== Ranks ===
Officer ranks

NATO code	OF-10	OF-9	OF-8	OF-7	OF-6	OF-5	OF-4	OF-3	OF-2	OF-1
Dutch Caribbean Coast Guard
Dutch Caribbean Coast Guard							Kapitein der 1^{ste} klasse	Kapitein	Stuurman der 1^{ste} klasse	Stuurman

Enlisted ranks

NATO code	OR-9	OR-8	OR-7	OR-6	OR-5	OR-4	OR-3	OR-2		OR-1
Dutch Caribbean Coast Guard
Dutch Caribbean Coast Guard	Opperschipper		Schipper	Bootsman		Kwartiermeester		Vol matroos der 1e klasse	Vol matroos	Matroos	Licht matroos

== See also ==
- Netherlands Coastguard (Nederlandse Kustwacht), the Dutch Coast Guard
