= Damen Stan Patrol 4100 =

Dutch patrol vessel class

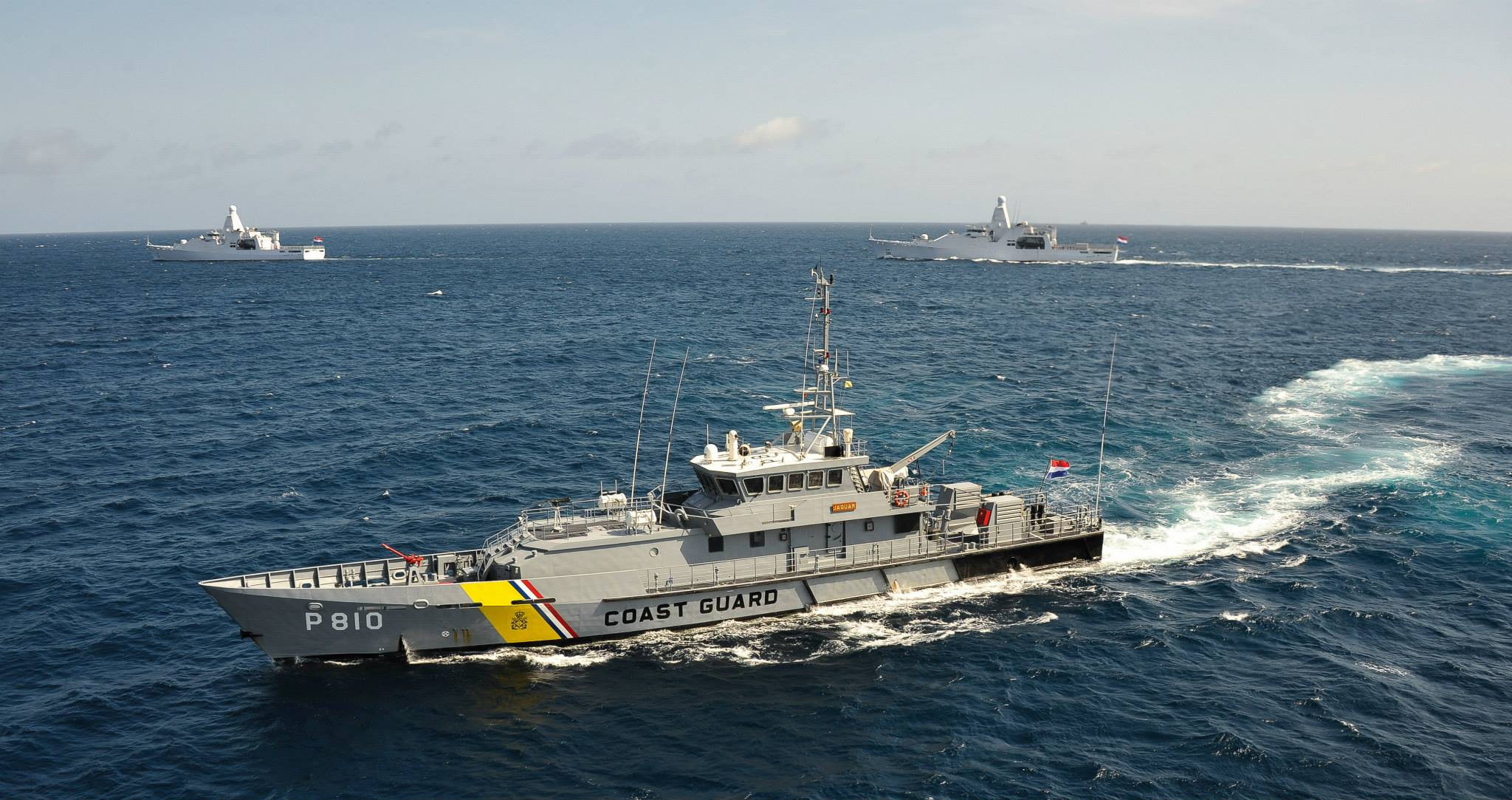
Dutch Caribbean Coast Guard cutter Jaguar, a Damen Stan 4100 patrol vessel

The Damen Stan Patrol 4100 patrol vessel design is a design from the Damen Group, a conglomerate of maritime companies based in the Netherlands. Damen has a long history of designing, licensing out, and building small and medium-sized coastal patrol vessels. All their designs have a four digit code, where the first two digits are the length of the vessel, in metres.

Damen only built a limited number of patrol vessels to the 4100 design, but experience gained with the 4100 design was used when designing the slightly larger 4207 design. Several dozen vessels have been built to the Damen Stan 4207 patrol vessel design for a dozen nations.

The Dutch Caribbean Coast Guard operates three 4100 patrol vessels, the Jaguar, Poema and the Panter. One vessel is stationed at each of Aruba, Curaçao, Sint Maarten with maritime tracking indicating they vessels rotated between the islands. Vietnam Maritime search and Rescue Coordination Center (VN MRCC) also operates three vessels.

specifications
displacement	206 tonnes
speed	26 knots
armament	1 x 12.7mm machine gun 1 x firefighting water cannon
endurance	7 days
power	2 x diesels generating 5,600 brake horsepower (4,200 kW)
bow thruster	for maneuvering in tight quarters
boats	1 x jet-powered inspection boat, launched from a stern launching ramp 1 x dory with 25 brake horsepower (19 kW) outboard
