= Lillian Ngoyi (patrol vessel) =

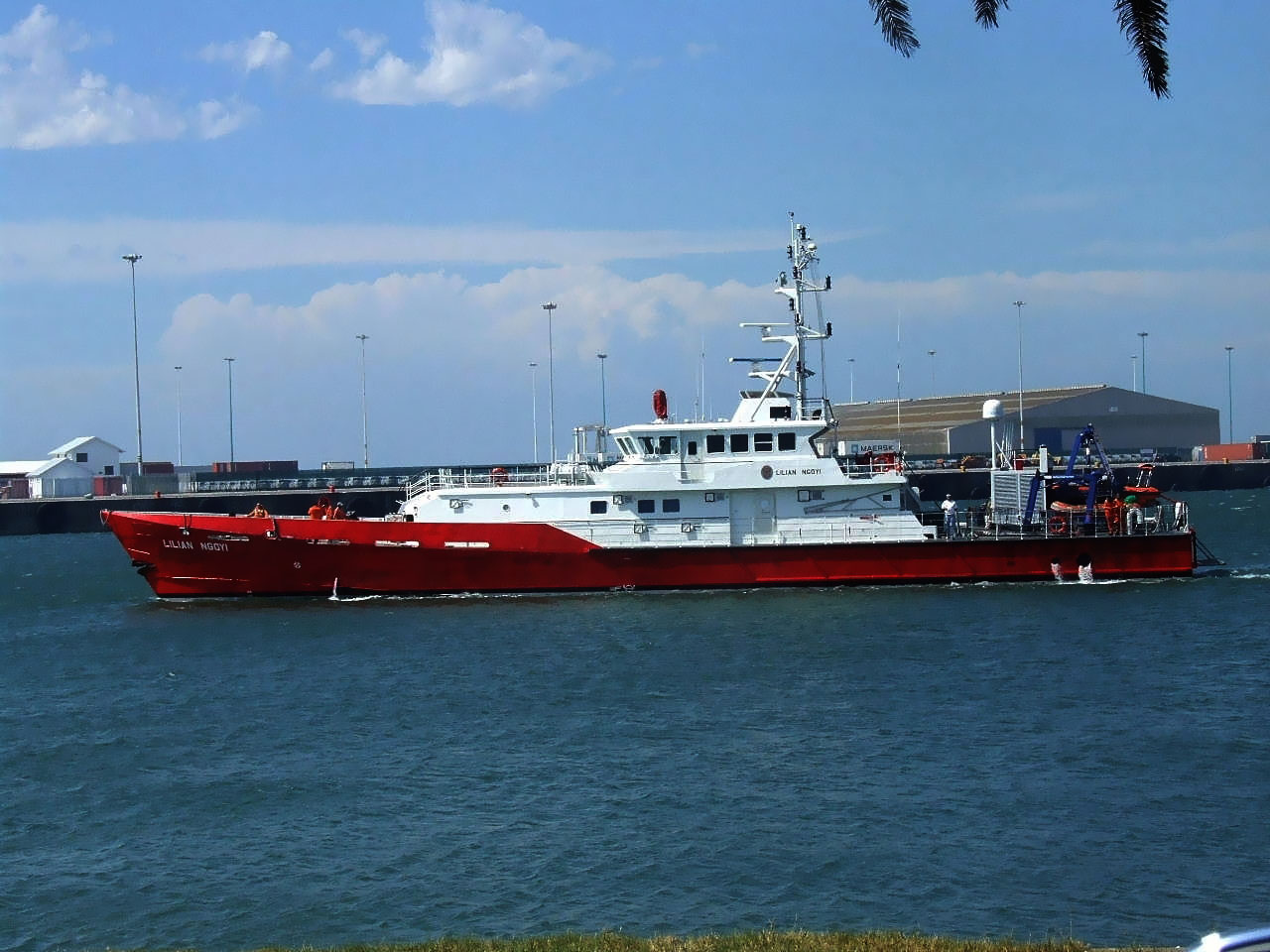
- South African environmental patrol vessel Lilian Ngoyi

History

South Africa
- Name: Lillian Ngoyi
- Namesake: Lillian Ngoyi
- Operator: Department of Agriculture, Forestry and Fisheries
- Builder: Farocean Marine, Cape Town
- Laid down: February 2003
- Launched: 27 September 2004
- In service: 16 November 2004
- Status: in active service, as of 2012

General characteristics
- Class & type: Lillian Ngoyi-class patrol vessel
- Length: 46.8 m (153 ft 7 in)
- Beam: 8.11 m (26 ft 7 in)
- Draught: 4 m (13 ft 1 in)
- Propulsion: 2 × 2,720 kW (3,648 hp) MTU 16V 4000 diesel engines; 1 × 75 kW (101 hp) bow thruster
- Speed: 25 knots (46 km/h; 29 mph)
- Range: 3,500 nmi (6,500 km; 4,000 mi) at 15 kn (28 km/h; 17 mph)
- Endurance: 14 days
- Complement: 13 + 2 fishery conservation officers

Lillian Ngoyi is the lead vessel in the South African Department of Agriculture, Forestry and Fisheries's Lillian Ngoyi-class inshore patrol vessels. She was built in South Africa by Farocean Marine based on the Damen Stan patrol vessel 4708 design. As well as fishery protection duties, the vessel is equipped for cleaning up oil spills, search-and-rescue work, fire fighting, and limited towing. The ship will operate up to 200 nautical miles offshore.

Within months of her commissioning, the South African government reported successful anti-poaching operations.

Like her sister ships, Ruth First and Victoria Mxenge she is named in honor of an anti-apartheid activist — Lillian Ngoyi.
