= HMC Searcher =

UK Border Force 42m Customs Cutter

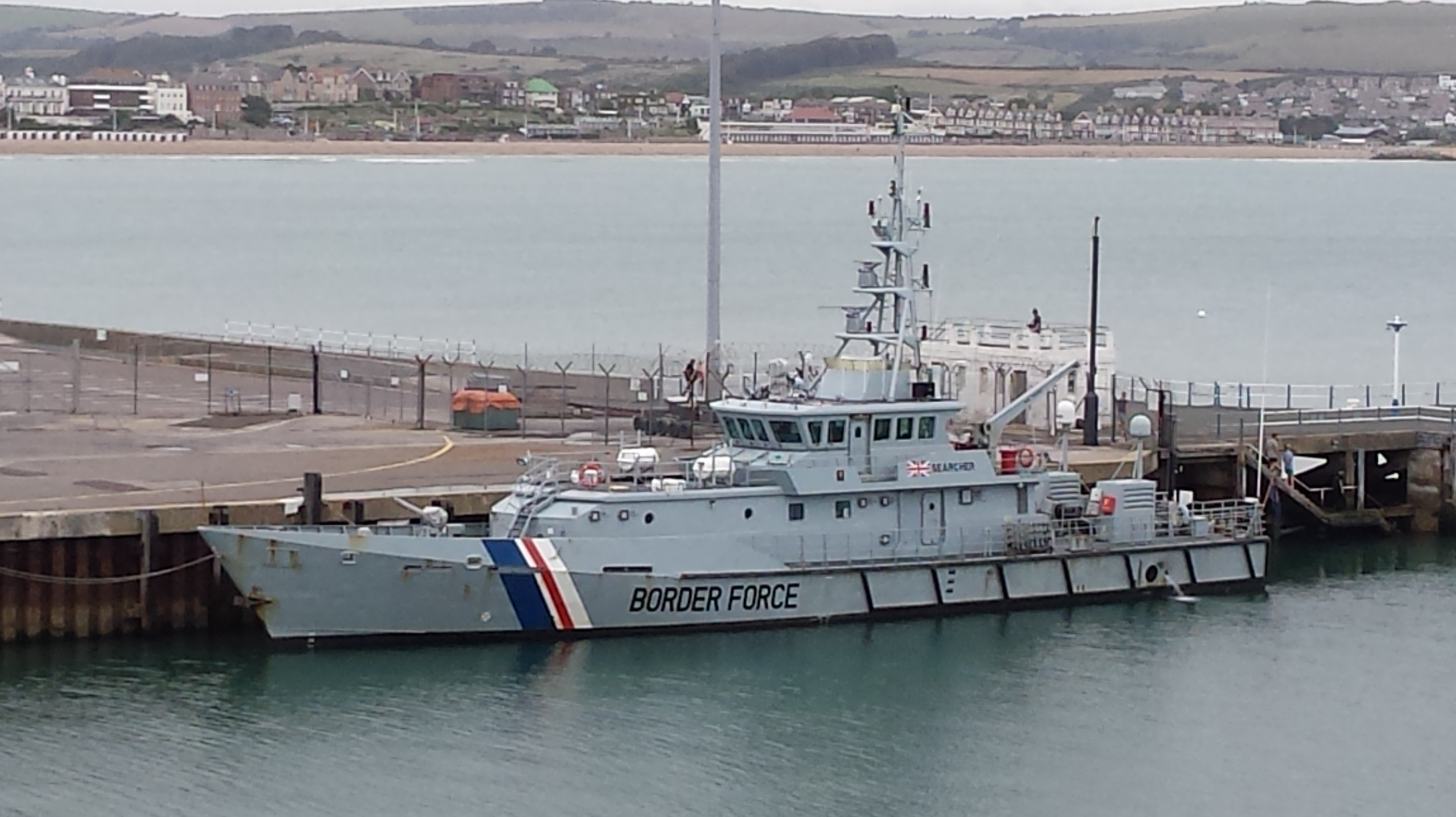
- The UK Border Force ship Searcher at Weymouth in 2016.

History

United Kingdom
- Name: Searcher
- Builder: Damen Group, Netherlands
- Launched: 2002
- Commissioned: 2002
- Identification: IMO number: 9234800; MMSI number: 235081000; Callsign: ZQNK9

General characteristics
- Class & type: UKBF 42m Customs Cutter
- Length: 42.80 m (140.4 ft)
- Beam: 7.11 m (23.3 ft)
- Draught: 2.52 m (8.3 ft)
- Installed power: 4,176 kW (5,600 hp)
- Propulsion: Two Caterpillar 3516B DI-TA Elec; Two 3.5:1 reduction gearboxes; Two 4-blade controllable pitch propellers; One Promac bow thruster; Two 106kWA generator sets
- Speed: 26 knots (48 km/h)
- Range: 1,750 nmi (3,240 km) at 12kn
- Endurance: 14 days
- Boats & landing craft carried: One 7m RIB (32 kn); One 3.8m Rescue Boat
- Complement: 12

HMC Searcher is one of four UKBF 42m Customs Cutter ships operated by UK Border Force in the role of patrolling the waters of the United Kingdom. She was launched by Damen Shipyards in the Netherlands in 2002.

== History ==
HMC Searcher entered service in 2002 with what was then HM Customs and Excise (HMCE). HMCE merged with the Inland Revenue in 2005, and the cutter fleet became part of the newly founded HM Revenue and Customs. In 2008, the fleet transferred to the UK Border Agency, which was established to maintain the UK border. She now operates as part of the UK Border Force fleet of five cutters.

== Prefix ==
From the merger of the Inland Revenue and HM Customs and Excise into HM Revenue and Customs on 18 April 2005, customs cutters changed their prefix from "HMRC" (His Majesty's Revenue Cutter) to "HMCC" (His Majesty's Customs Cutter). Following the transfer to the UK Border Agency this was shortened to the present "HMC" (His Majesty's Cutter) and a new livery was applied to the fleet.

== Construction ==
HMC Searcher is the third of the Customs and Excise's fleet of 42-metre (138 ft) customs patrol vessels. She was built in 2002 in the Damen Shipyards in the Netherlands, and has a steel hull with an aluminium superstructure.

Her 7-metre (23 ft) Rigid Inflatable Boat is launched and recovered from her stern slipway.

== Propulsion ==
She is fitted with twin Caterpillar diesel engines, with a top speed of 26 knots (48 km/h).
