= HMS Cornwall =

Seven ships of the Royal Navy have been named HMS Cornwall after the Duchy of Cornwall. Cornwall's motto is onen hag oll (- Cornish), unus et omnes (- Latin), one and all - English).

- HMS Cornwall (1692) was an 80-gun third-rate ship of the line launched in 1692 and broken up in 1761.
- HMS Cornwall (1761) was a 74-gun third-rate launched in 1761. She was damaged in action in 1780, and subsequently burnt as unserviceable.
- HMS Cornwall was the name initially chosen for HMS Heir Apparent, a 74-gun third rate captured from the Danes in 1807, but the name was not used.
- HMS Cornwall (1812) was a 74-gun third-rate launched in 1812. She was reduced to 50 guns in 1831, was renamed HMS Wellesley in 1869 and served as a school ship until broken up in 1874.
- HMS Cornwall was a 74-gun third rate launched in 1815 as HMS Wellesley. She was renamed HMS Cornwall in 1868 when she became a school ship, and was sunk in 1940.
- HMS Cornwall (1902) was a Monmouth-class armoured cruiser launched in 1902 and sold in 1920.
- HMS Cornwall (56) was a County-class heavy cruiser launched in 1926 that a Japanese air attack sank during the Indian Ocean raid in 1942.
- HMS Cornwall (F99) was a Type 22 Batch 3 frigate launched in 1985 and decommissioned in June 2011.

== Battle honours ==
- Barfleur 1692
- Falkland Islands 1914
- Dardanelles 1915

== See also ==
- HMJS Cornwall - ships of the Jamaica Defence Force
