= Cornwall (1798 ship) =

History

Great Britain
- Name: Cornwall
- Namesake: Cornwall
- Builder: Whitby
- Launched: 1798, or 1799
- Fate: Post-1827 is currently obscure.

General characteristics
- Tons burthen: 380, or 384 (bm)
- Armament: 14 × 9-pounder guns

Cornwall was launched in Whitby in 1798 or 1799 as a West Indiaman. Between 1817 and 1819 she made two voyages to Bengal, sailing under a licence from the British East India Company (EIC). She made a third voyage, this time in 1825, to Bombay. The last readily accessible reports of her movements have her returning to Liverpool from Demerara in early 1827.

== Career ==
Cornwall first appeared in Lloyd's Register (LR) in 1800. In 1800 Lloyd's List reported that Cornwall, Campion, master, had arrived in Jamaica from Newcastle, having come via New York.

Year	Master	Owner	Trade	Source & notes
1800	Campion	C.Fletcher	Newcastle–New York	Register of Shipping
1800	Campion	C.Fletcher	Liverpool–Jamaica	LR
1804	Campion; N.Juvell	C.Fletcher	Liverpool–Jamaica	LR
1805	Campion	C.Fletcher	Liverpool–Jamaica	LR
1813	Campion; M'Dowall	C.Fletcher	Liverpool–Jamaica	LR; large repair 1809

On 2 July 1812, as Cornwall, Campion, master, was on her way from Jamaica to Liverpool at 47°00′N 33°50′W she came across an American brig with all her spars gone, except the bowsprit, and no one on board.

Year	Master	Owner	Trade	Source & notes
1814	M'Dowall	Gladstone	Liverpool–Newfoundland	LR; large repair 1809 & 1813
1815	M'Dowall	Gladstone	Liverpool–Demerara	LR; large repair 1809 & 1813

In 1813 the EIC had lost its monopoly on the trade between India and Britain. British ships were then free to sail to India or the Indian Ocean under a license from the EIC.

On 30 April 1817 Cornwall, J.Oxley, master, sailed from England, bound for Fort William, India under a license from the EIC. She arrived at Bengal on 14 August and on 22 October sailed for Liverpool. On 2 April 1818 she arrived back at Liverpool.

Year	Master	Owner	Trade	Source & notes
1818	J.Oxley	Gladstone	Liverpool–Bengal	LR; thorough repair 1817
1819	J.Oxley	Gladstone	Liverpool–Calcutta	RS; thorough repair 1817

Cornwall, Oxley, master, sailed again for Bengal on 1 June 1818. On 9 July she sailed from Madeira. She arrived in Bengal on 12 November. On 18 September 1819 Cornwall, Oxley, master, arrived in Liverpool. On the 14th she had grounded on Rush Shoal, near Blackwater, County Wexford, but was gotten off the next day. She had sailed from the Sand Heads on 28 March.

Year	Master	Owner	Trade	Source & notes
1820	Oxley	Gladstone	Liverpool–Demerara	RS; thorough repair 1817 & damages repaired 1819
1821	Hannay	Gladstone	Liverpool–Demerara	RS; thorough repair 1817 & damages repaired 1819
1822	T.Robbs; J.Wright	Gladstone	Liverpool–Demerara	RS; damages repaired 1819 & small repairs 1822

On 24 May 1823 Cornwall, Wright, master, put back into Demerara a few days after she had left for Liverpool. She had developed a leak. The source of the leak was discovered after she had unloaded about 120 packets. Three days later she was completing her reloading and was expected to sail again in a few days. It was believed that her cargo had not sustained any damage.

Year	Master	Owner	Trade	Source & notes
1823	J.Wright; R.Morrison	Gladstone	Liverpool–Demerara	LR; damages repaired 1819, small repairs 1822, small repairs 1823
1826	R.Morrison	Gladstone	Liverpool–Bombay; Liverpool–Demerara	LR; damages repaired 1819, small repairs 1822, small repairs 1823

On 6 January 1825 Cornwall, Morrison, master, sailed from Liverpool for Bombay. She was again sailing under a license from the EIC. She arrived in Bombay on 26 May. On 3 July she put back into Bombay. She had left some days earlier but had encountered severe weather that started a leak. She had to discharge some of her cargo and it was expected that she would have to go into dock. She left St Helena on 28 October. On 13 November at 6°N 24°W she spoke the whaler Ann. Cornwall arrived back in Liverpool on 18 December.

== Fate ==
Cornwall was last listed in LR in the volume for 1826. (The volume for 1827 available online is missing the relevant pages.) She was listed in the Register of Shipping for a number of more years, but with data stale from 1826. Cornwall, Morrison, master, last appeared in the ship arrival and departure data in British newspapers as being in Demerara in early 1827.
