= Mphahlele =

Mphahlele is a surname of South African origin. Notable people with this name include:

- Es'kia Mphahlele (1919–2008), South African writer
- Letlapa Mphahlele (born 1960), South African politician
- Mash Mphahlele (born 1990), South African association football player
- Ramahlwe Mphahlele (born 1990), South African association football player
- Ryan Mphahlele (born 1998), South African runner
- Segopotje Mphahlele (born 1968), South African judge
