= HMC Valiant =

UK Border Force 42m Customs Cutter

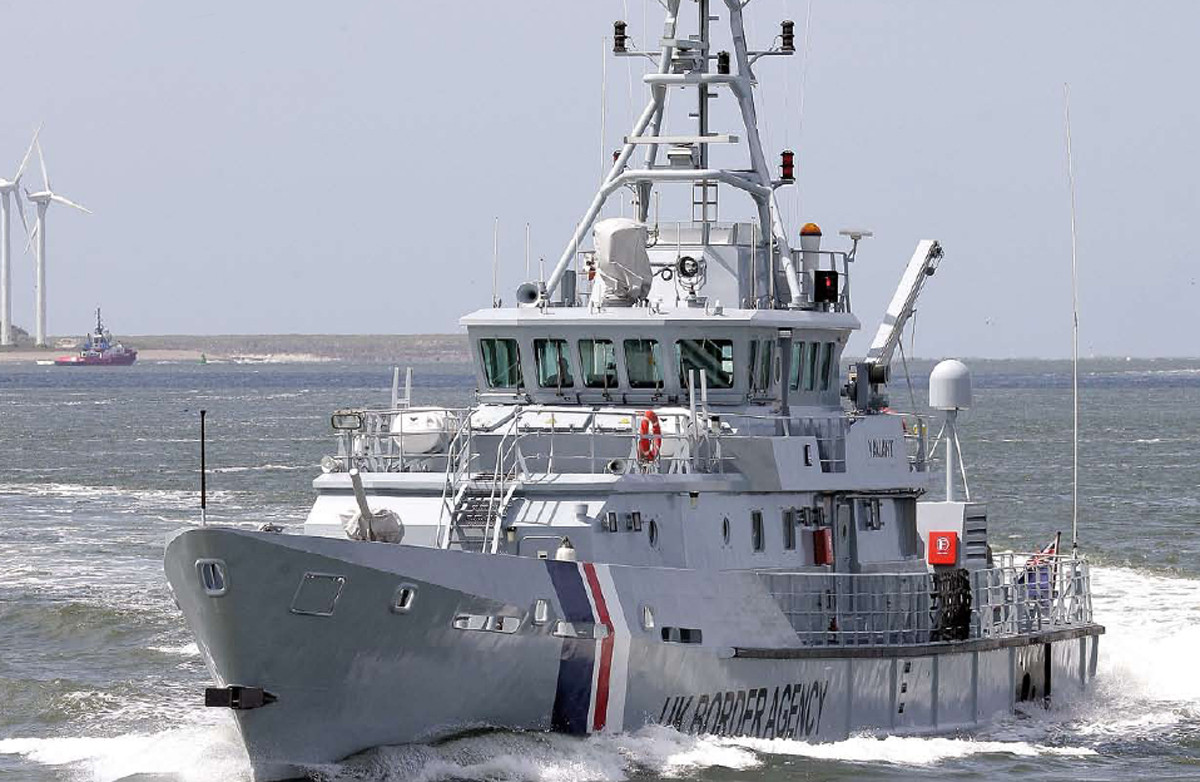
- HMC Valiant

History

United Kingdom
- Name: Valiant
- Builder: Damen Group, Netherlands
- Cost: £4.3M
- Launched: 2004
- Commissioned: April 2004
- Identification: IMO number: 9293698; Callsign: MBLL8

General characteristics
- Class & type: UKBF 42m Customs Cutter
- Displacement: 257 tonnes
- Length: 42.80 m (140.4 ft)
- Beam: 7.11 m (23.3 ft)
- Draught: 2.52 m (8.3 ft)
- Installed power: 4,176 kW (5,600 hp)
- Propulsion: Two Caterpillar 3516B DI-TA Elec; Two 3.5:1 reduction gearboxes; Two 4-blade controllable pitch propellers; One Promac bow thruster; Two 106kWA generator sets
- Speed: 26 knots (48 km/h)
- Range: 1,750 nmi (3,240 km) at 12kn
- Endurance: 14 days
- Boats & landing craft carried: One 7m RIB (32 kn); One 3.8m Rescue Boat
- Complement: 12

HMC Valiant is a Border Force (customs), formerly UK Border Agency, cutter of the United Kingdom. She was launched by Damen Shipyards in the Netherlands in 2003 and is one of four UKBF 42m Customs Cutters, 42-metre (138 ft) cutters formerly operated by His Majesty's Revenue and Customs, and since 2008 operated by the UK Border Agency and after its dissolution in 2013 operated by the UK Border Force.

== Prefix ==
The Inland Revenue and HM Customs and Excise Departments merged to form HM Revenue and Customs on 18 April 2005, and from this time customs cutters changed their prefix from "HMRC" (His Majesty's Revenue Cutter) to "HMCC" (His Majesty's Customs Cutter). Following transfer to the UK Border Agency this was shortened to the current "HMC" (His Majesty's Cutter) and a new livery applied to the fleet of cutters.

== Construction ==
HMC Valiant is the fourth of the Customs and Excise's fleet of 42-metre (138 ft) customs patrol vessels. She was built in 2003 in the Damen Shipyards in the Netherlands, and has a steel hull with an aluminium superstructure. Much effort has been expended in making her quiet to reduce crew fatigue; the engines are raft-mounted, decks throughout the ship are of a floating type, and her compartments are constructed on a box-within-a-box principle.

A 7-metre (23 ft) Rigid Inflatable Boat (RIB) can be launched from her stern slipway. She is fitted with a 2,000-litre (440 imp gal) per minute fire fighting system for dealing with fires in other ships.

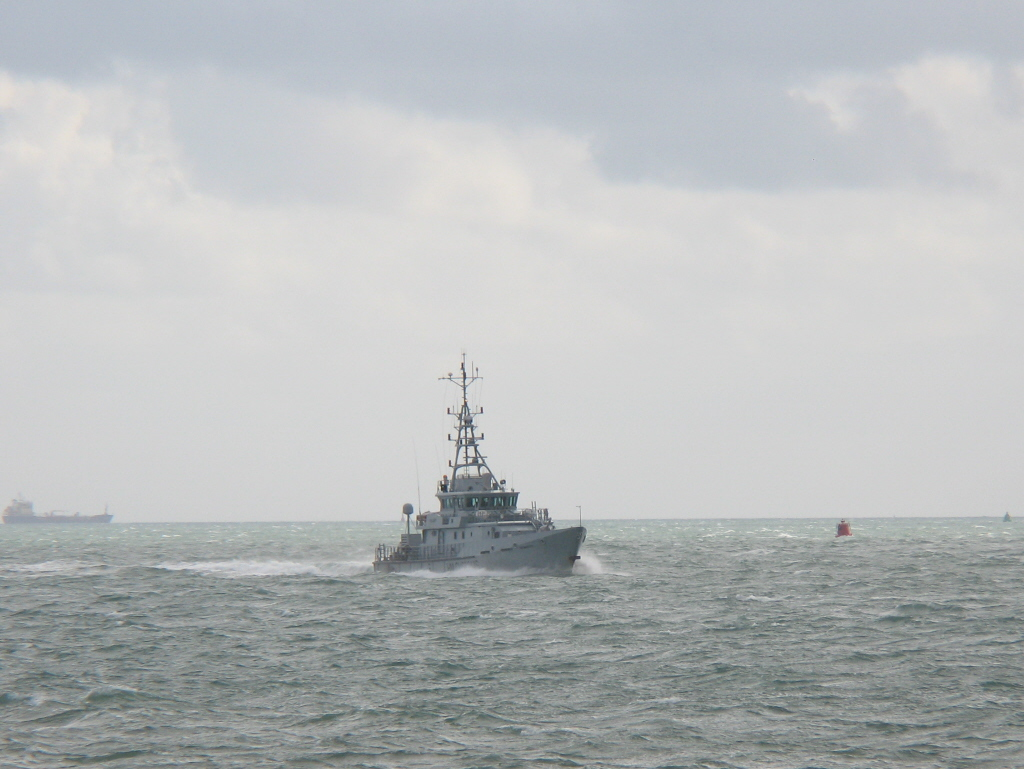
HMC Valiant in the Solent on 23 October 2008

== Propulsion ==
Valiant is fitted with twin Caterpillar 3516B DI-TA Elec engines driving twin 4-bladed controllable-pitch propellers through a pair of 3.5:1 reduction gearboxes. The total installed power of 4,176 kW (5,600 hp) giving a top speed of 26 knots (48 km/h). A single Promac bow thruster is installed for slow speed manoeuvring in confined spaces. Electrical power is supplied by a pair of 106kWA generators.

== Operational history ==
On 23 April 2015, together with the Royal Navy frigate Somerset, she intercepted the Tanzanian-registered tug Hamal in the North Sea, about 100 miles off Aberdeen, leading to the seizure of more than three tons of cocaine, believed to be the single largest seizure of a Class A drug in the UK.

In June 2021, it was revealed that the Valiant had successfully requested permission to enter French waters to pick up migrants and take them to Britain. The Home Office launched an urgent investigation into the matter.
