= HMJS Cornwall =

Two ships of the JDF Coast Guard have been named for Cornwall, one of the three traditional counties of Jamaica.

- HMJS Cornwall (2005) – a County-class patrol vessel derived from the Damen Stan 4207 in service 2005–2017
- HMJS Cornwall (2016) – a Damen Stan 4207 patrol vessel

== See also ==
- HMS Cornwall
