= UKBF 42m Customs Cutter =

British class of four patrol vessels

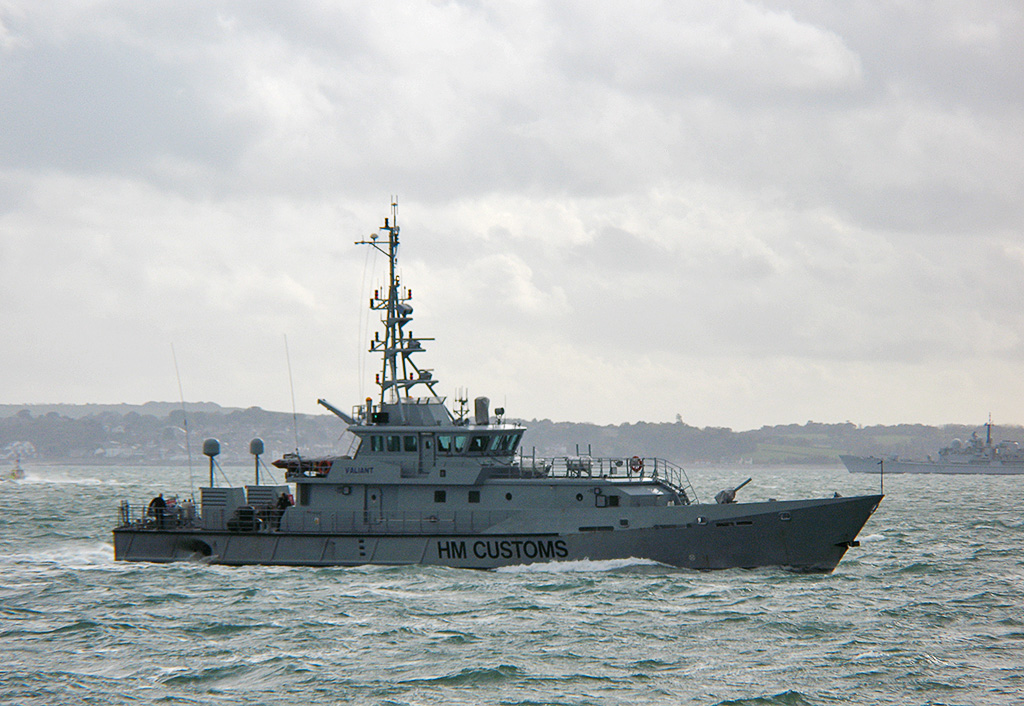
- HMC Valiant of the Border Security Command, 2008

Class overview
- Name: 42m Customs Cutter
- Builders: Damen Group, Netherlands
- Operators: Border Security Command
- Cost: £4.3M per unit
- Built: 2001–2004
- In service: 2001–present
- Completed: 4
- Active: 4

General characteristics
- Type: Customs Cutter & Patrol
- Displacement: 257 tonnes
- Length: 42.80 m (140.4 ft)
- Beam: 7.11 m (23.3 ft)
- Draught: 2.52 m (8.3 ft)
- Installed power: 4,176 kW (5,600 hp)
- Propulsion: Two Caterpillar 3516B DI-TA Elec; Two 3.5:1 reduction gearboxes; Two 4-blade controllable pitch propellers; One Promac bow thruster; Two 106 kVA generator sets
- Speed: 26 knots (48 km/h)
- Range: 1,750 nmi (3,240 km) at 12 kn
- Endurance: 14 days
- Boats & landing craft carried: One 7 m RIB (32 kn); One 3.8 m Rescue Boat
- Complement: 12

The BSC 42m Customs Cutter, FORMERLY UKBF, HMRC 42m Customs Cutter & UKBA 42m Customs Cutter, is a class of four patrol vessels, derived from the Dutch Damen Stan Patrol 4207 design, operated by the UK Border Security Command.

== Construction ==
The class were built to the Damen Stan Patrol 4207 design in the Damen Shipyards in the Netherlands between 2001 and 2004, and have a steel hull with an aluminium superstructure. Much effort has been expended in making them quiet to reduce crew fatigue; their engines are raft-mounted, decks throughout the ships are of a floating type, and their compartments are constructed on a box-within-a-box principle.

A 7-metre (23 ft) rigid inflatable boat (RIB) can be launched from the stern slipway. They are fitted with a 2,000-litre (440 imp gal) per minute fire fighting system for dealing with fires in other ships.

== Name prefix ==
The Inland Revenue and HM Customs and Excise Departments merged to form HM Revenue and Customs on 18 April 2005, and from this time customs cutters changed their prefix from "HMRC" (Her Majesty's Revenue Cutter) to "HMCC" (Her Majesty's Customs Cutter). Following transfer to the UK Border Agency this was shortened to the current HMC (Her Majesty's Cutter) and a new livery applied to the fleet of cutters.

== Propulsion ==
The class is fitted with twin Caterpillar 3516B DI-TA Elec engines driving twin 4-bladed controllable-pitch propellers through a pair of 3.5:1 reduction gearboxes. The total installed power of 4,176 kW (5,600 hp) gives them a top speed of 26 knots (48 km/h). A single Promac bow thruster is fitted for slow speed manoeuvring in confined spaces. Electrical power is supplied by a pair of 106 kVA generators.

== Armament ==
Customs cutters are not normally armed with fixed firearms, nor are crews normally armed. What is often taken to be a gun on the bow of UKBA cutters is in fact a fire monitor. When necessary, the Royal Navy, whose ships are armed, can be asked for assistance.

== Ships ==
Name	Ship Builder	Launched	Callsign	IMO Number	Notes
HMC Seeker	Damen Shipyard, Netherlands	2001	ZQNL2	9234795	In service
HMC Searcher	Damen Shipyard, Netherlands	2002	ZQNK9	9234800	In service
HMC Vigilant	Damen Shipyard, Netherlands	2003	ZITI4	9276353	In service
HMC Valiant	Damen Shipyard, Netherlands	2004	MBLL8	9293698	In service

== Operations ==
Customs cutters often intercept vessels suspected of smuggling of illegal narcotic drugs.

Vigilant seized an estimated 300 kg of cocaine off the south coast of the Isle of Wight in gale-force conditions during 2010. Officers from the UK Border Agency, the Serious Organised Crime Agency and Hampshire Police discovered the drugs in 11 rucksacks attached to a buoy off Tennyson Point, close to where a fishing vessel had been spotted acting suspiciously over the bank holiday weekend. Three people were arrested on the fishing vessel Galwad-Y-Mor (SU116) in Yarmouth, and were charged with conspiracy to import cocaine into the UK.

Searcher seized cannabis said to be worth £12 million off the Sussex coast in July 2011. Searcher's fast patrol intercepted and boarded a Dutch yacht, which was escorted into Newhaven Harbour, and four men were arrested, tried, convicted, and sentenced to prison. One cutter was deployed to the Aegean Sea in 2016 in support of the migrant crisis.

Interceptions and boarding by all customs cutters—no more detailed information is available—increased steadily from 514 in 1999–2000 to 1,981 in 2008–09

On 27 October 2021 it was announced in the Autumn Budget and Spending Review that £74 million of capital funding had been allocated to replace the five cutters plus six coastal patrol vessels.

== See also ==
- Damen Stan 4207 patrol vessel
- Hero-class patrol vessel
- HMC Sentinel
