= Lillian Ngoyi-class patrol vessel =

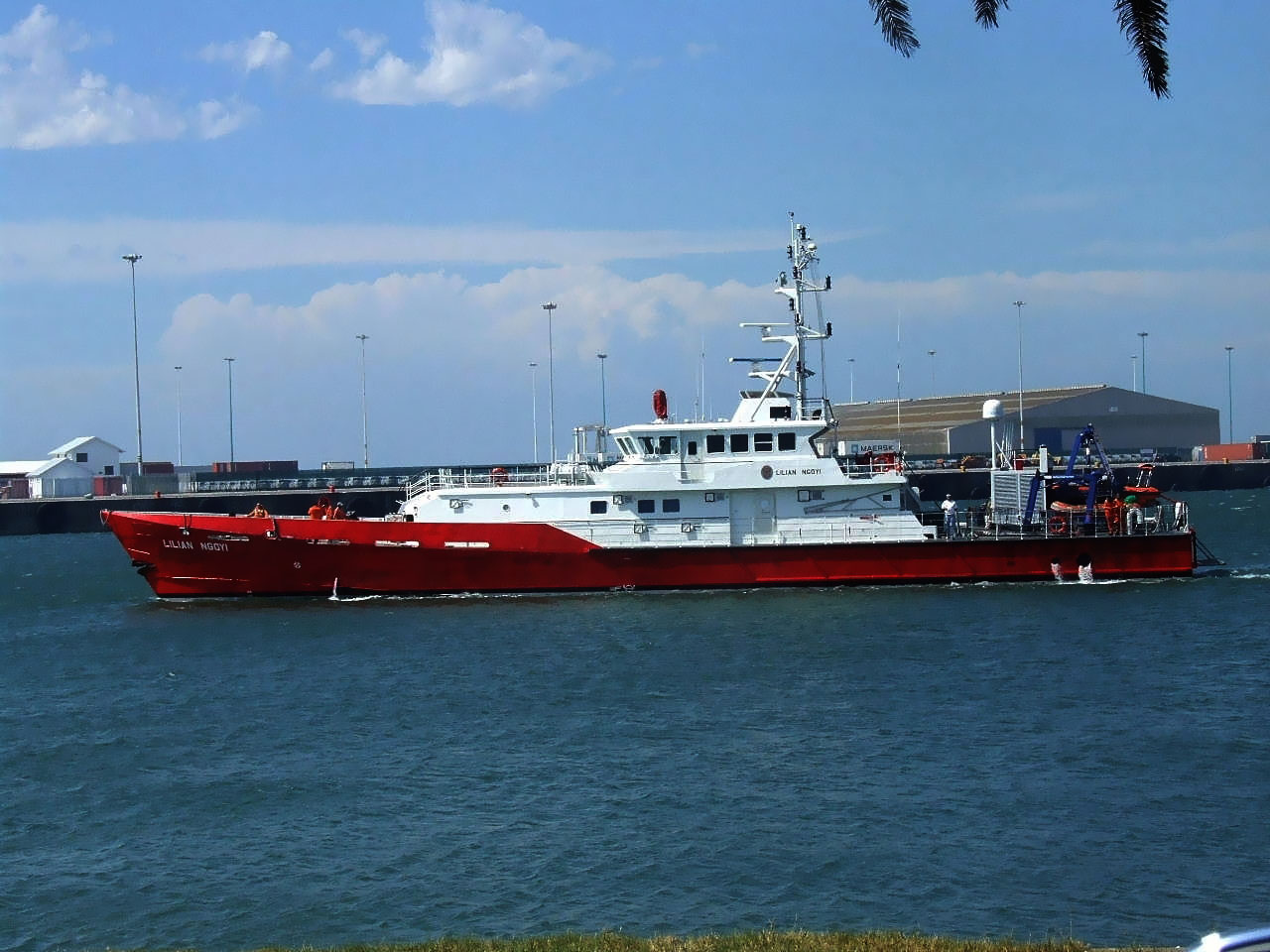
- Lillian Ngoyi, the first vessel of the class

Class overview
- Name: Lillian Ngoyi class
- Operators: South Africa
- In commission: 2004–present
- Planned: 3
- Completed: 3
- Active: 3

General characteristics
- Type: Environmental patrol vessel
- Displacement: 353 metric tons
- Length: 46.8 m (153.5 ft)
- Beam: 8.11 m (26.6 ft)
- Depth: 2.9 m (9.5 ft)
- Propulsion: 2 × 2,770 kW (3,710 shp); 1 × 75 kW (101 shp) bow thruster
- Speed: 25 knots (46 km/h; 29 mph)
- Range: 2,500 nmi (4,600 km; 2,900 mi)
- Endurance: 14 days

South Africa operates three Lillian Ngoyi-class environmental patrol vessels, based on the Damen Stan 4708 design. The vessels are named Lillian Ngoyi, Ruth First and Victoria Mxenge.

The vessels were constructed in South Africa by Farocean Marine. The United States Coast Guard later decided to acquire up to 58 Sentinel-class 154 ft (47 m) fast response cutters (FRC), also based on the Damen Stan patrol vessel 4708 design, citing the success of the South African vessels.

vessel	launched	notes
Lillian Ngoyi	2004–11	Named after anti-apartheid activist Lillian Ngoyi.
Ruth First	2005-05	Named after anti-apartheid activist Ruth First.
Victoria Mxenge	2005	Named after anti-apartheid activist Victoria Mxenge.
