= HMC Vigilant =

UK Border Force 42m Customs Cutter

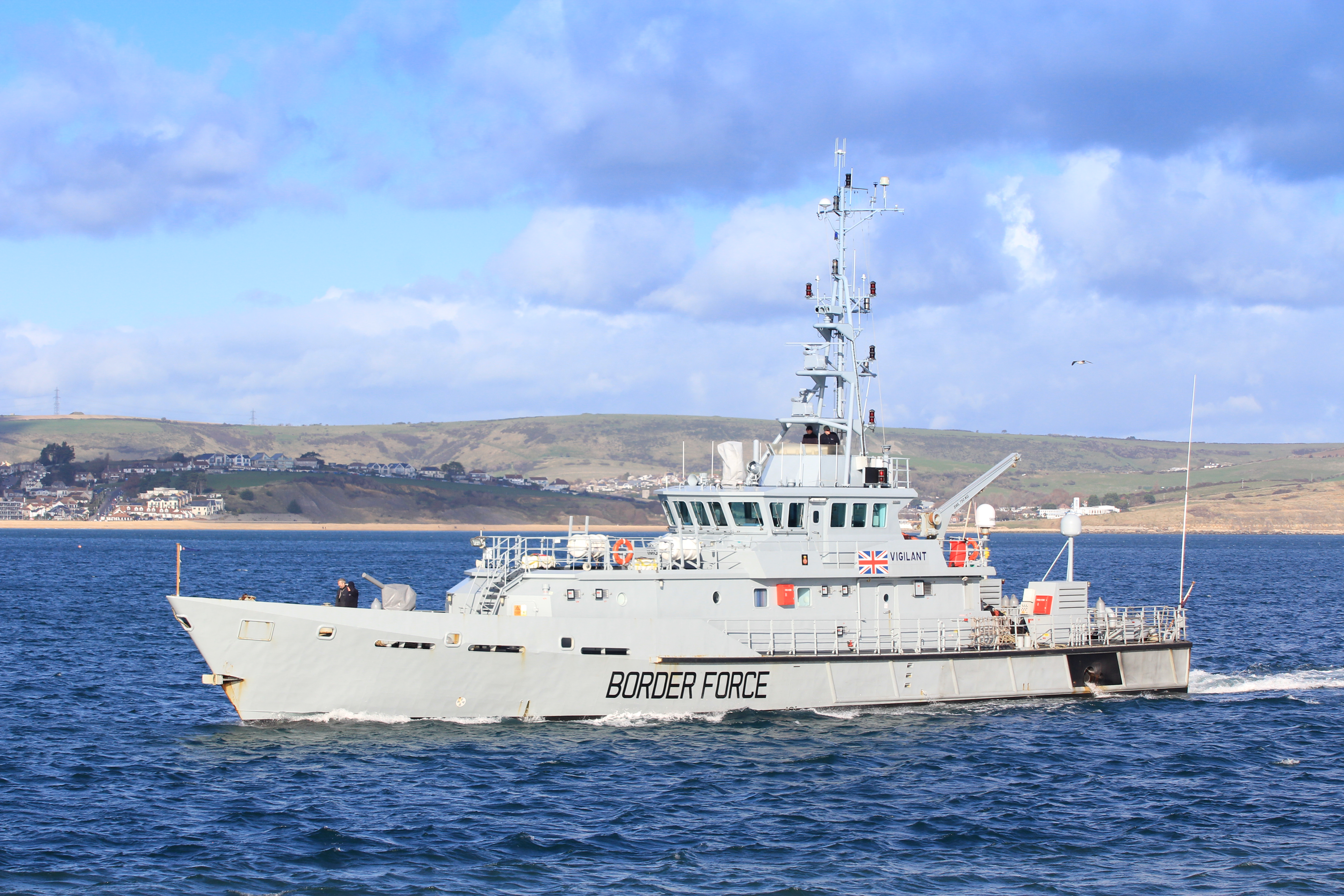
- HMC Vigilant entering Weymouth Harbour, November 2017

History

United Kingdom
- Name: Vigilant
- Builder: Damen Group, Netherlands
- Launched: 2003
- Commissioned: June 2003
- Identification: IMO number: 9276353; Callsign: ZITI4

General characteristics
- Class & type: UKBF 42m Customs Cutter
- Length: 42.80 m (140.4 ft)
- Beam: 7.11 m (23.3 ft)
- Draught: 2.52 m (8.3 ft)
- Installed power: 4,176 kW (5,600 hp)
- Propulsion: Two Caterpillar 3516B DI-TA Elec; Two 3.5:1 reduction gearboxes; Two 4-blade controllable pitch propellers; One Promac bow thruster; Two 106kWA generator sets
- Speed: 26 knots (48 km/h)
- Range: 1,750 nmi (3,240 km) at 12kn
- Endurance: 14 days
- Boats & landing craft carried: One 7m RIB (32 kn); One 3.8m Rescue Boat
- Complement: 12

HMC Vigilant is a Border Agency (customs) cutter of the United Kingdom. She was launched by Damen Shipyards in the Netherlands in 2003 and is one of four UKBF 42m Customs Cutters, 42-metre (138 ft) cutters operated by the UK Border Force.

== History ==
Vigilant entered service for the British Government by the then HM Customs and Excise in 2004. In 2008, the fleet of customs cutters was transferred, along with border control duties, from HM Revenue and Customs to the newly formed UK Border Agency. She now operates as part of the UK Border Force fleet of five cutters.

== Prefix ==
The Inland Revenue and HM Customs and Excise Departments merged to form HM Revenue and Customs on 18 April 2005, and from this time customs cutters changed their prefix from "HMRC" (Her Majesty's Revenue Cutter) to "HMCC" (Her Majesty's Customs Cutter). Following transfer to the UK Border Agency this was shortened to the current "HMC" (Her Majesty's Cutter) and a new livery applied to the fleet of cutters.

== Construction ==
Vigilant is the third of the Customs and Excise's fleet of 42-metre (138 ft) customs patrol vessels. She was built in 2003 in the Damen Shipyards in the Netherlands, and has a steel hull with an aluminium superstructure. Much effort has been expended in making her quiet to reduce crew fatigue; the engines are raft-mounted, decks throughout the ship are of a floating type, and the compartments are constructed on a box-within-a-box principle.

The 7-metre (23 ft) Rigid Inflatable Boat can be launched from her stern slipway. A 2,000-litre (440 imp gal) per minute fire fighting system for dealing with fires in other ships.

== Propulsion ==
Vigilant is fitted with twin Caterpillar 3516B DI-TA Elec engines driving twin 4-bladed controllable-pitch propellers through a pair of 3.5:1 reduction gearboxes. The total installed power of 4,176 kW (5,600 hp) gives her a top speed of 26 knots (48 km/h). A single Promac bow thruster is installed for slow speed manoeuvring in confined spaces. Electrical power is supplied by two 106kWA generators.
