= ENS El Moez =

Gowind-class corvette of the Egyptian Navy

History

Egypt
- Name: El Moez; (المعز)
- Namesake: El Moez
- Builder: Alexandria Shipyard, Alexandria
- Laid down: July 2018
- Launched: 12 May 2019
- Identification: Pennant number: 981
- Status: Fitting out

General characteristics
- Class & type: Gowind-class corvette
- Displacement: 2,500 tons
- Length: 102 m (334 ft 8 in) - 111 m (364 ft 2 in)
- Propulsion: CODAD
- Speed: 28 knots (52 km/h; 32 mph)
- Range: 3,700 nmi (6,900 km; 4,300 mi) at 15 knots (28 km/h; 17 mph)
- Endurance: 21 days
- Complement: 65 + 15 Special forces
- Sensors & processing systems: SMART-S MK2 3D radar; CAPTAS-2 variable depth sonar; SETIS combat system by Naval Group
- Electronic warfare & decoys: VIGILE 200 Tactical R-ESM System; ALTESSE Naval C-ESM
- Armament: 1 × OTO Melara 76 mm or Bofors 57 mm main gun; 2 × Nexter Narwhal 20 mm or MSI DS30M 30 mm cannon; 8 - 16 × VLS for MICA VL; 4 - 8 × Exocet or Naval Strike Missile anti ship missile; 2 × triple torpedo launcher
- Aircraft carried: 1 × 5-tons helicopter or 1 × 10-tons helicopter (supported); Schiebel Camcopter S-100
- Aviation facilities: Hangar and helipad

ENS El Moez (981) is the third ship of Egyptian Gowind-class corvette of the Egyptian Navy.

== Development and design ==
In 2014, Egypt signed a €1bn contract with Naval Group to buy four Gowind 2,500-ton corvettes with an option for two more. Separately, MBDA negotiated a contract to equip the ships with MICA vertical launch air-defense missiles and MM40 Block 3 Exocet anti-ship missiles, together worth an additional 400 million euros, while Naval Group negotiated a 100–200 million euro contract for torpedoes. Three of the corvettes are to be built locally by Alexandria Shipyardwithin a technology transfer agreement. It was apparently President Abdel Fattah el-Sisi who decided these were the ships he wanted rather than the Meko A200 being offered by German group ThyssenKrupp Marine Systems (TKMS) or the Sigma corvette proposed by Damen of the Netherlands. Egypt is in talks with France to acquire another two Gowind corvettes which, if ordered, would be produced by France in Lorient.

In April 2015, Naval Group started cutting metal for the very first Gowind 2500 corvette, with a planned construction period of 29 months. It is the first of a series of four units that will be delivered to Egypt before 2019. The corvette's first block was laid in the dry dock in September 2015. Naval Group celebrated the launch of the first Egyptian Gowind corvette El Fateh at the Lorient naval shipyard in September 2016. El Fateh successfully concluded its first sea trials by the end of March 2017. The Egyptian Navy took delivery of the vessel in September 2017, three years after the order was placed.

== Construction and career ==
El Moez was laid down in July 2018 and launched on 12 May 2019 by Alexandria Shipyard in Alexandria.
