= KD Sharif Mashor =

Malaysian Navy Lela-class frigate

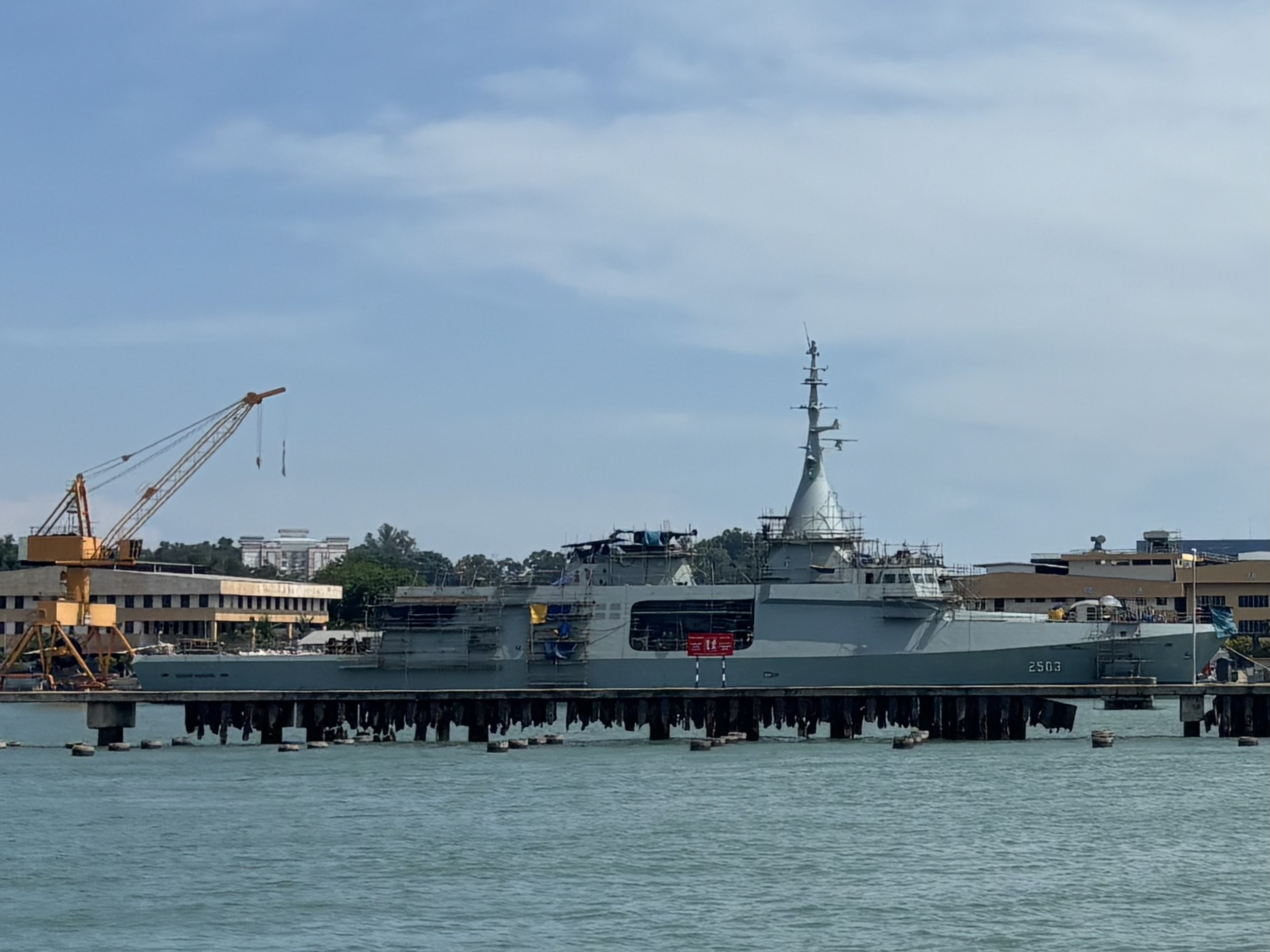
- KD Sharif Mashor, docking at Lumut Naval Shipyard while it was still under construction.

History

Malaysia
- Name: KD Sharif Mashor
- Namesake: Sharif Mashor
- Builder: Boustead Heavy Industries Corporation / Lumut Naval Shipyard (Primary shipbuilder); Naval Group (Design authority)
- Laid down: 18 December 2017
- Launched: 10 February 2026
- Identification: Hull number: 2503
- Status: Launched

General characteristics
- Class & type: Maharaja Lela-class frigate
- Displacement: 3,100 long tons (3,150 t) full load
- Length: 111 m (364 ft 2 in)
- Beam: 16 m (52 ft 6 in)
- Draught: 3.85 m (12 ft 8 in)
- Propulsion: CODAD 4 x MTU 20V 1163 M94, each rated at 7,400 kW (9,925 shp), total output: 29,600 kW (39,694 shp)
- Speed: 28 knots (52 km/h)
- Range: 5,000 nautical miles (9,300 km) at 15 knots (28 km/h)
- Complement: 138
- Sensors & processing systems: Combat system: Naval Group SETIS; Search radar: Thales SMART-S Mk2; Fire control radar: Rheinmetall TMEO Mk2 electro-optical tracking system & TMX/EO Mk2; Sonar: Thales TUS ASW suite: Kingklip Mk.1 hull-mounted sonar & CAPTAS-2 towed array sonar
- Electronic warfare & decoys: RESM: Thales Vigile; DLS: Wallop's Super Barricade decoy launching system
- Armament: Guns: 1 × Bofors 57 mm gun; 2 × MSI DS30M 30 mm cannon; Anti-air: 16 × VL MICA in Sylver VLS; Anti-ship: 8 × Atmaca; Anti-submarine: 2 × triple J+S torpedo launcher
- Aircraft carried: Various types of UAVs and helicopters, weighing up to 10 tons
- Aviation facilities: Stern hangar and helicopter landing platform

KD Sharif Mashor is the third ship of the Maharaja Lela-class frigates built in Malaysia, by Boustead Heavy Industries Corporation, and now Lumut Naval Shipyard. It was built based on heavier version of Gowind-class design. The ship bears the name of Sharif Mashor where he was a famous Malay warrior in Sarikei, Sarawak, Malaysia during the era of the second Raj of Sarawak.

== Development ==
Sharif Mashor was laid down on 18 December 2017. The ship is equipped with three-dimensional warfare, including anti-air, anti-surface, and anti-submarine warfare. The ship was launched on 10 February 2026 by Toh Puan Fauziah Mohd Sanusi and witnessed by the Yang di-Pertua Negeri of Sarawak, Tun Dr Wan Junaidi Tuanku Jaafar, at the Lumut Naval Shipyard.
