= Maharaja Lela-class frigate =

Stealth frigates being built for the Royal Malaysian Navy

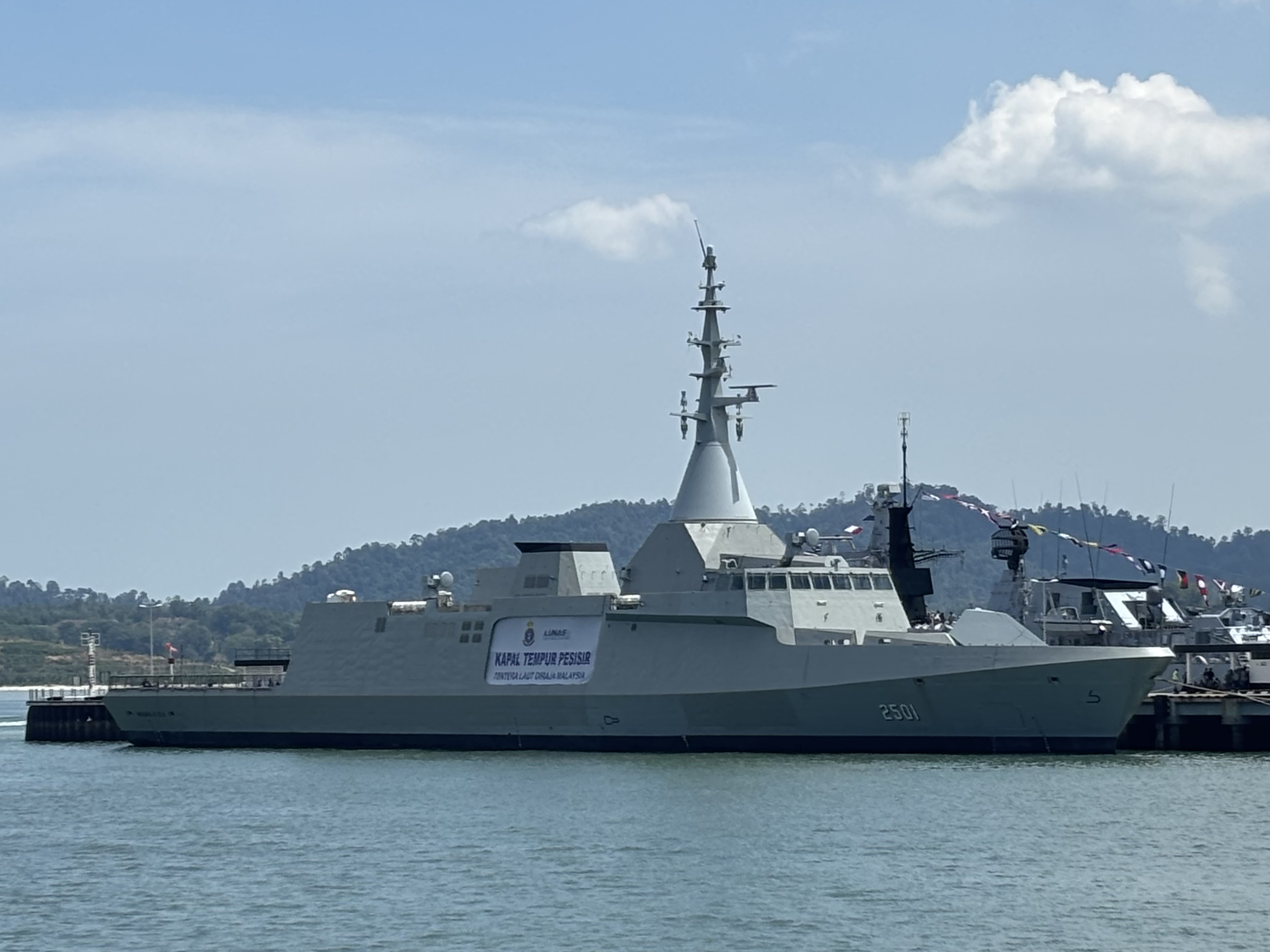
- KD Maharaja Lela, the lead ship of the class, on display during the Lumut Naval Base open day in May 2026, before her official commission, which is scheduled in December that year.

Class overview
- Name: Maharaja Lela class
- Builders: Boustead Heavy Industries Corporation / Lumut Naval Shipyard (Primary shipbuilder); Naval Group (Design authority)
- Operators: Royal Malaysian Navy
- Preceded by: Lekiu class
- Cost: Revised (final): RM11.2B for 5 ships (final agreed-upon contract price dealing with cost overruns); RM 2.24 billion (2023) per unit + ToT (ceiling) [or $948M (2023 inflation) or ~$700M (2011 forex) or ~$490M (2023 forex)] (Note: To get a clear or consistent comparison from 2011 forex rates to the eventual cost overruns, the original 2011 Ringgit-Dollar forex ($1 = ~RM3.21) is retained, thus the resulting ~$700M figure per LCS. The RM11.2B revised contract price was announced in 2023 May 26 (forex: $1 = ~RM4.6) thus the resulting mere ~$490M figure per LCS. This forex factor is crucial as it's obviously ridiculous that LCS price became only slightly higher than the original $466M (2011) figure despite the huge cost overruns across the years, as well as the ringgit's dropped value against the US dollar, thus the lower $490M figure referring to ringgit's decreased value in 2023 USD forex rate as compared in 2011's $466M per LCS price. To avoid confusion, focus on the consistent increase of price by ringgit value per LCS: 1.5B (2011) to 1.8B (~2022) to 2.24B (2023). Also note that inflation and forex are different, thus RM2.24B (2023) is converted by Wikipedia as $948M (same year 2023), as compared to forex-only conversion of ~$700M (2011 forex) and ~$490M (2023 forex). This note is written in 2024 June, thus USD Wikipedia's inflation conversion remains at 2023's $948M figure.) (excluding ammo (Note: The MICA SAMs are still planned; the NSM contract have no actual cruise missiles, but only includes its launchers & other support components; no mention for the contract for the torpedoes, only the J+S torpedo-launchers. All points to separate contracts which are normal for ammunitions procurement, separated from the platforms.)); Inflation adjustment roughly equivalent to $1002 million in 2025 US dollars (excluding ammo); Revised (initial): RM 9.128B for 5 ships (initial figures using the original contract price in dealing with cost overruns); RM 1.8 billion (2011) per unit + ToT (ceiling) or $560 million per ship (excluding ammo); Inflation adjustment roughly equivalent to $801 million in 2025 US dollars (excluding ammo); Original: RM 9B for 6 ships; RM 1.5 billion (2011) per unit + ToT (ceiling) or $466 million per ship (excluding cost overruns and ammo); Inflation adjustment roughly equivalent to $667 million in 2025 US dollars (excluding cost overruns and ammo)
- In commission: 2026-
- Planned: 6
- Building: 5
- Cancelled: 1

General characteristics
- Type: Littoral combat ship / Frigate
- Displacement: 3,100 tons
- Length: 111 m (364 ft 2 in) (overall); 105 m (344 ft 6 in) (waterline)
- Beam: 16 m (52 ft 6 in) (main deck); 14.2 m (46 ft 7 in) (waterline)
- Draught: 3.85 m (12 ft 8 in)
- Propulsion: CODAD 4 x MTU 20V 1163 M94, each rated at 7,400 kW (9,925 shp), total output: 29,600 kW (39,694 shp)
- Speed: 28 knots (52 km/h; 32 mph)
- Range: 5,000 nmi (9,300 km; 5,800 mi) at 15 knots (28 km/h; 17 mph)
- Complement: 138
- Sensors & processing systems: Combat system: Naval Group SETIS; Search radar: Thales SMART-S Mk2; Fire control radar: Rheinmetall TMEO Mk2 electro-optical tracking system & TMX/EO Mk2; Sonar: Thales TUS ASW suite: Kingklip Mk.1 hull-mounted sonar & CAPTAS-2 towed array sonar
- Electronic warfare & decoys: RESM: Thales Vigile; DLS: Wallop Super Barricade decoy launching system
- Armament: Guns: 1 × Bofors 57 mm gun; 2 × MSI DS30M 30 mm cannon; Anti-air: 16 × VL MICA in Sylver VLS; Anti-ship: 8 × Atmaca; Anti-submarine: 2 × triple J+S torpedo launcher
- Aircraft carried: Various types of UAVs and helicopters, weighing up to 10 tons
- Aviation facilities: Stern hangar and helicopter landing platform

The Maharaja Lela-class frigate, also known as the Littoral Combat Ship (LCS), is a class of six stealth frigates being built for the Royal Malaysian Navy (RMN). First announced as the Second Generation Patrol Vessel (SGPV) in 2011, the ships are based on an enlarged version of the Gowind-class design, designed by Naval Group, formerly known as DCNS of France.

The contract has been finalised and it has been decided that all six ships will be built by local shipbuilder Boustead Heavy Industries Corporation (BHIC) and later Lumut Naval Shipyard for the RMN at a ceiling price of RM9 billion (US$2.8 billion), starting from 2015. With the ships being 111 metres (364 ft 2 in) long and a displacement of 3,100 tonnes (3,100 long tons), it would be the largest and most modern surface combatants in the Royal Malaysian Navy to date once delivered, being longer and more capable than the Lekiu-class frigate.

== Development ==
In early 2011, Malaysia announced its SGPV program with a budget of RM6 billion (US$1.9 billion) and six foreign shipbuilders announced interest in the project, most notably ThyssenKrupp Marine Systems with the MEKO 200 and Damen Schelde Naval Shipbuilding with the Sigma class 10514 as well as Naval Group's Gowind-class design which was ultimately selected.

In late 2011, it was announced that the Gowind class had been chosen and that the SGPV program had been awarded to Boustead Heavy Industries Corporation (BHIC) / Naval Group, with the ceiling price increasing to RM9 billion (US$2.8 billion) from RM6 billion (US$1.9 billion). The RM9 billion (US$2.8 billion) contract included intellectual property rights and technology transfer. The ships' sizes had also changed in accordance with the increase in ceiling price, increasing from 2,700 tonnes (2,700 long tons) to 3,100 tonnes (3,100 long tons). All six ships will be built in Lumut, Malaysia and electronic components will be assembled in Cyberjaya.

At DSA 2014, BHIC confirmed that the program is progressing rather well, with some parts already in critical design review the first ship expected to be finished by 2019. BHIC was in charge of designing the Malaysian specification.

On 5 October 2014, RMN chief Admiral Aziz told IHS Jane's that construction of the first of the six ships had started at the BHIC facilities in Lumut, and reiterating a 2019 delivery date for the first ship and the remaining five ships delivered at six-month intervals thereafter. It also stated that RMN's current planning schedule called for sea trials of the first ship to be carried out in 2018 and operational entry in 2019.

=== Delays ===
In 2020, the Malaysian government announced that the LCS project had encountered some delays. The Ministry of Defence awarded the project to BHIC in 2011 and at least two vessels slated by 2020 had not been delivered. The Ministry of Defence considered two options to resolve the delayed RM9 billion LCS project by BHIC. The first option required BHIC to complete the first of two ships, while the second option was for the government to ask Naval Group (the original designer) to complete the ships; the latter option was rejected by parliament.

Following the delays, the parliamentary Public Accounts Committee (PAC) said it would call up former defence minister Ahmad Zahid Hamidi. PAC chairman Wong Kah Woh said former RMN chief, Admiral Abdul Aziz Hj Jaafar and the main contractor of the LCS project, BHIC would also be called. Pangkor assemblyman Zambry Abdul Kadir said about 200 vendors and contractors would shut down and 10,000 workers would be affected if the LCS program continued to be delayed. On 5 May 2021, the Malaysian government decided that it would retain BHIC as the class' shipbuilder. In November 2021, Minister of Defence, Datuk Seri Hishamuddin Hussein said, the first ship will be commissioned in 2025.

On 4 August 2022, the PAC reported that RM1.4 billion had been misappropriated and that the project had been awarded through direct negotiations without an open tender. The then-defence minister Ahmad Zahid Hamidi had reportedly accepted the navy's preferred choice for a Sigma-class design on 26 May 2011, but then decided in favour of the Gowind-class design on 11 July 2011 after a discussion with Boustead Naval Shipyard. Then-chief of navy Abdul Aziz Jaafar protested against the choice and later stated that the RMN had fought a "losing battle, right from the start", citing that the Sigma was a proven concept (in 2011) with other navies operating it, unlike the Gowind design.

On 16 August 2022, former managing director of BHIC Ahmad Ramli Mohd Nor was charged with three counts of criminal breach of trust in Sessions Court, where he pleaded not guilty. The accused had previously served as chief of navy prior to his BHIC appointment. The following day, Senior Defence Minister Hishammuddin Hussein said that a Royal Commission of Inquiry is expected to be established to investigate the procurement process and subsequent non-delivery of the ships.

=== Resumption ===
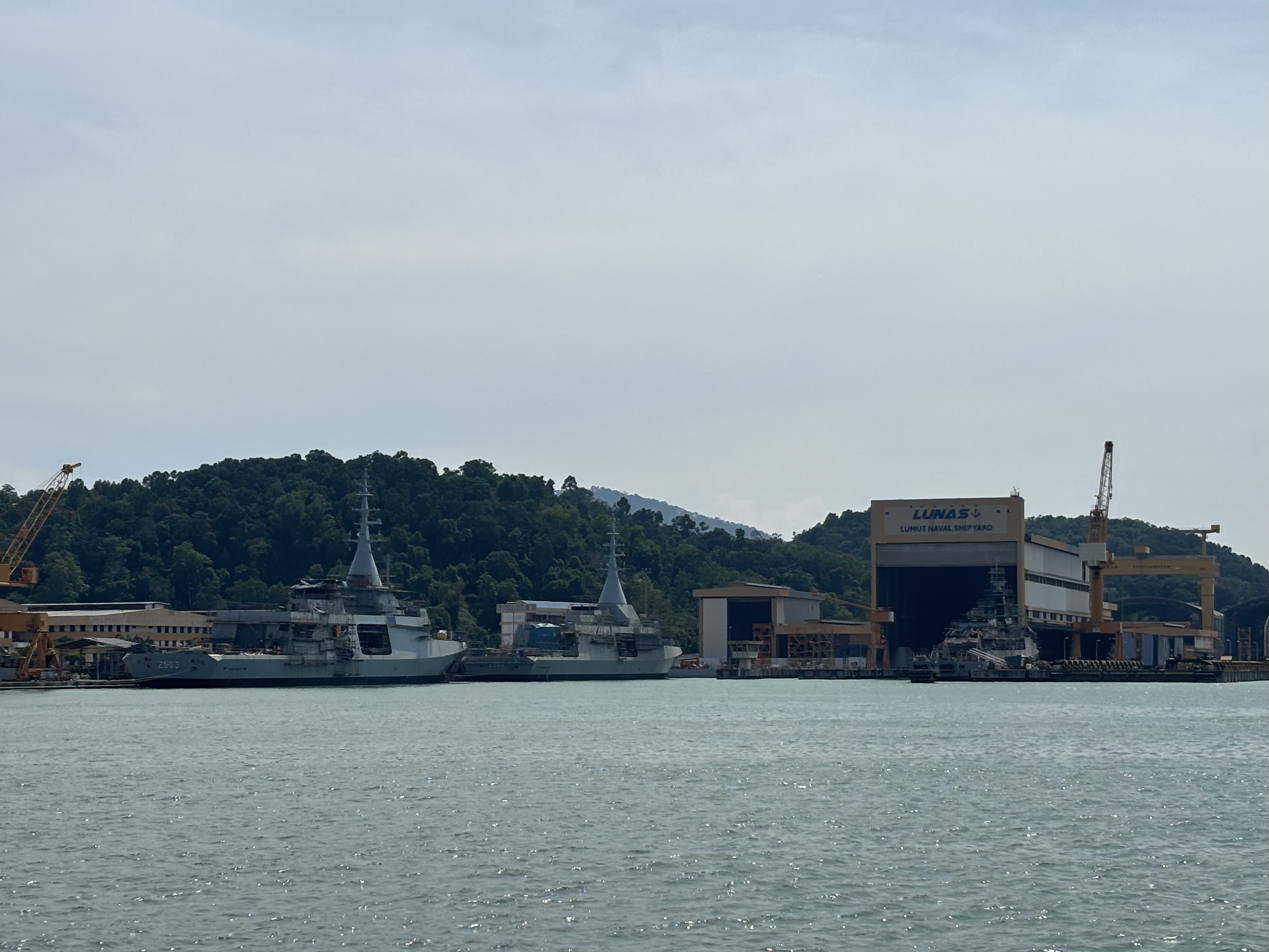
KD Sharif Mashor and KD Raja Muda Nala (from left to right) were spotted docking at Lumut Naval Shipyard, undergoing construction

In January 2023, after a review by the Malaysian government, the LCS project was relaunched, though it was decided to acquire only five ships instead of six. Detailed design works by Lumut Naval Shipyard were handed over to the RMN in October 2024. Maharaja Lela sailed underway on her own power for the first time on 28 January 2026 during her sea trials.

== Characteristics ==
=== General ===
Specifications

- Displacement – 3,100 tons
- Length – 111 m (overall) / 105 m (waterline)
- Breadth – 16 m (main deck) / 14.2 m (waterline)
- Draught – 3.85 m
- Propulsion – CODAD
- Maximum speed – 28 knots
- Range – 5,000 nm at 15 knots
- Crew – 138
- Survivability – Sea State 9
- Endurance – 21 days
- Aircraft carried – 1 × Super Lynx 300 / Fennec AS555 / AW139 / EC725

=== Sensors ===
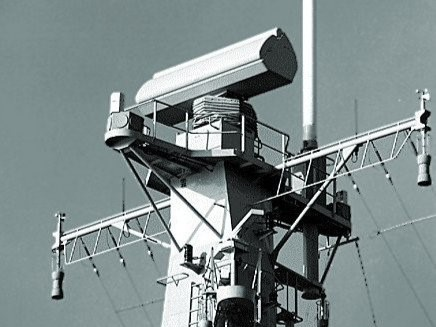
SMART-S radar for the LCS

It is believed that the RMN had requested for the Thales Herakles radar, as used on the FREMM frigates, but BHIC chose the SMART-S radar instead. These following sensors have been chosen for the ships.

- Combat system: Naval Group SETIS
- Search radar: Thales SMART-S Mk2
- Fire control radar: Rheinmetall TMEO Mk2 electro-optical tracking system & TMX/EO Mk2
- Sonar: Thales CAPTAS-2 ASW suite with hull sonar and towed array sonar

=== Armament ===
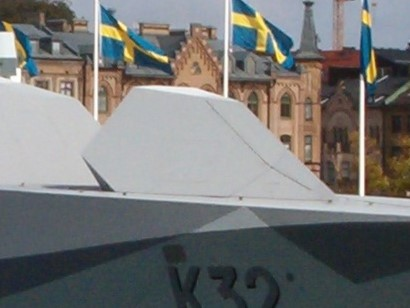
The stealth 57 mm gun to equip the LCS, seen with the barrel retracted

The Bofors 57 mm gun will be mounted in a stealth cupola similar to the ones mounted on the Swedish Visby-class corvettes. This frigate will also be equipped with two MSI DS30M 30 mm cannons as secondary guns. BHIC also announced the allocation of 16 Sylver VLS on the deck of the ship for surface-to-air missiles where the VL MICA has been selected for the role. While Kongsberg has received a Letter of Award worth approximately €20 million at LIMA 2015 from Boustead Naval Shipyard to supplied Naval Strike Missile (NSM). The delivery is to prepare for NSM anti-ship missiles onboard the upcoming RMN's LCS which will consist of the necessary fixed installations such as launchers, cables, electronics and integration to the combat management system SETIS to be provided by DCNS. For anti-submarine capabilities, it is confirmed that the ships will be equipped with two J+S fixed triple torpedo launchers.

In March 2026, the Norwegian government banned the export of the NSM to Malaysia a few days before a scheduled delivery. The ban was announced to the public in May, after which Prime Minister Anwar Ibrahim expressed Malaysia's "objection" to his Norwegian counterpart Jonas Gahr Støre. On the same day, a special committee was set up by Defence Minister Mohamed Khaled Nordin to oversee legal action and compensation claims against Norway. A new missile system will also be sought for to replace the NSM.

== Ships of the class ==
Name	Pennant number	Image	Builders	Laid down	Launched	Commissioned	Homeport	Notes
Maharaja Lela	2501		BHIC / Lumut Naval Shipyard	8 March 2016	24 August 2017	April 2027		
Raja Muda Nala	2502		BHIC / Lumut Naval Shipyard	28 February 2017	9 May 2025	August 2027		
Sharif Mashor	2503		BHIC / Lumut Naval Shipyard	18 December 2017	10 February 2026			
Mat Salleh	2504		BHIC / Lumut Naval Shipyard	31 October 2018	January 2027			
Tok Janggut	2505		BHIC / Lumut Naval Shipyard	TBA				
Mat Kilau	Cancelled							

== See also ==
- List of naval ship classes in service
- List of equipment of the Royal Malaysian Navy
