= Gowind-class design =

French multi-role ship design

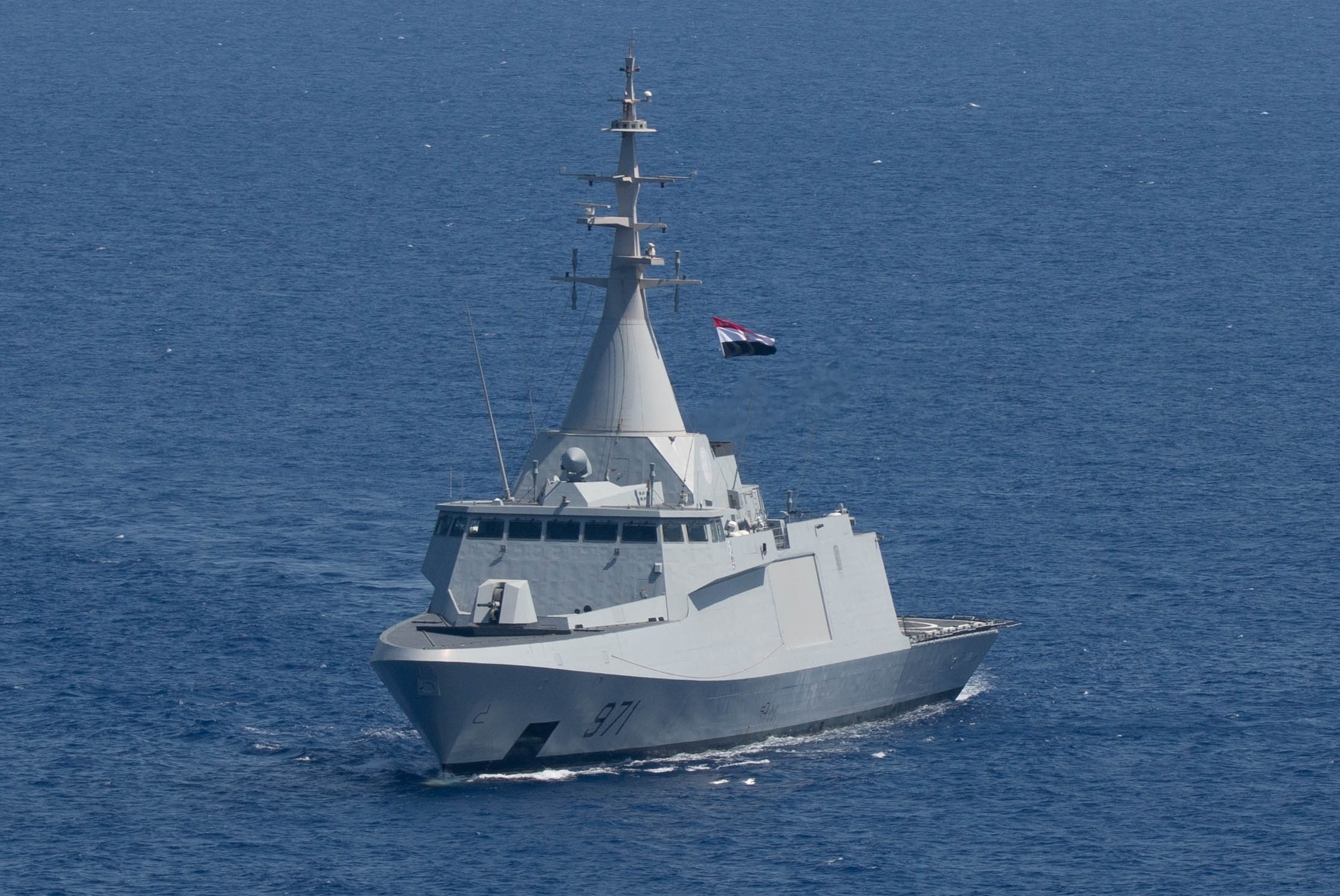
- The Egyptian ENS El Fateh took part in a sailing exercise with members of Standing NATO Maritime Group Two (SNMG2) in 2022

Class overview
- Name: Gowind class
- Builders: Naval Group; Boustead Heavy Industries Corporation / Lumut Naval Shipyard; Alexandria Shipyard
- Operators: Argentine Navy; Egyptian Navy; United Arab Emirates Navy; Future operators; Royal Malaysian Navy
- Subclasses: Kership
- Cost: Gowind 1000: €80 million (2014) (equivalent to €96.8 million in 2025) per unit; Gowind 2500: €550 million (2026) per unit; Gowind 3100: RM 1.5 billion (2011) per unit + ToT (ceiling)
- In commission: 22 September 2017 – present
- Planned: 20
- Building: 5
- Completed: 10
- Cancelled: 5 (1 Royal Malaysian Navy, 4 Romanian Navy)
- Active: 10 (4 Egyptian Navy, 4 Argentine Navy, 2 UAE Navy)

General characteristics
- Type: Frigate, Corvette, Offshore patrol vessel
- Displacement: 1,000 tons - 3,100 tons
- Length: 85 m (278 ft 10 in) - 111 m (364 ft 2 in)
- Propulsion: CODAD
- Speed: 28 knots (52 km/h; 32 mph)
- Range: 3,700 nmi (6,900 km; 4,300 mi) at 15 knots (28 km/h; 17 mph)
- Endurance: 21 days
- Complement: 65 + 15 Special forces
- Sensors & processing systems: SMART-S MK2 3D radar; CAPTAS-2 variable depth sonar; SETIS combat system by Naval Group
- Electronic warfare & decoys: VIGILE 200 Tactical R-ESM System; ALTESSE Naval C-ESM
- Armament: 1 × Bofors 57 mm Naval Automatic Gun L/70 or OTO Melara 76 mm; 2 × KNDS Narwhal 20 mm or MSI DS30M 30 mm cannon; 8 - 16 × VLS for VL MICA; 4 - 8 × Exocet or Atmaca
- Aircraft carried: 1 × 5-tons helicopter or 1 × 10-tons helicopter (supported); Schiebel Camcopter S-100
- Aviation facilities: Stern hangar; Helicopter landing platform

The Gowind design is a family of steel monohull frigates, corvettes and offshore patrol vessels developed since 2006 by France's Naval Group, to conduct missions in the littoral zone such as anti-submarine warfare (ASW). The Gowind family includes vessels with lengths from 85 to 111 metres (278 ft 10 in to 364 ft 2 in) and displacement from 1,000 tons to 3,100 tons.

The Gowind design can deploy unmanned aerial vehicles (UAVs), unmanned surface vehicles (USVs) and underwater unmanned vehicles (UUVs). An aft deck has been provided allowing for a 10-ton class helicopter or UAV operations.

The platform's weapon system consists of a multi-functional radar and VL MICA surface-to-air missiles (SAM). It is armed with Exocet anti-ship missiles. The propulsion system is based on Combined Diesel and Diesel (CODAD) and includes water-jets for improved maneuverability in shallow waters and high-speed performance. There is no funnel on these ships. The radar and other sensors are mounted on a single central mast thus allowing 360-degree view. Naval Group offers two variants of the design: Gowind 1000 and Gowind 2500 while Malaysia with the assistance of Naval Group locally developed the Gowind 3100.

As of October 2021, the Greek government is in discussions with Naval Group about the acquisition of up to seven Gowind corvettes with three of them being built in Greece.

== Product reorganisation ==
The Gowind class originally consisted of offshore patrol vessels (OPVs) but after a rearrangement of products Naval Group decided to remove the OPV from the Gowind class and develop the OPVs as a class of their own with L'Adroit top of the range. To do so it formed the Kership joint venture with the Piriou shipyard in Concarneau, Brittany in May 2013 to build and market lightly armed and armoured OPVs for customs, fishing and other home security missions. Naval Group said this would enable it to concentrate on "developing relations" with clients seeking heavily armed and armoured warships while Kership handles the more civilian-standard OPVs.

== Class specifications ==
=== Gowind 1000 ===
The Gowind 1000 is a 1,000-ton corvette designed for protection, escort and embargo naval missions in a littoral environment. The Gowind 1000 can also perform presence, surveillance, intelligence and policing missions. It is armed with:

- 1 x OTO Melara 76 mm main gun
- 2 x Nexter Narwhal 20 mm cannon
- 8 x VLS for MBDA VL MICA surface-to-air missiles
- 4 x MBDA MM40 Exocet anti-ship missile launchers

Sensors:

- Integrated mast to integrate most sensors in a low observable design

=== Gowind 2500 ===
The Gowind 2500 multi-mission corvette is designed for surveillance, surface and subsurface combat, protection and escort naval missions. It can also perform presence, maritime surveillance and policing missions against trafficking and piracy.

The Gowind 2500 capitalizes on Naval Group's expertise in vessel stealth. The vessel is equipped with facilities for an embarked helicopter and drones. It is armed with:

- 1 × OTO Melara 76 mm main gun
- 2 × Nexter Narwhal 20 mm cannon
- 16 × VLS for MBDA VL MICA surface-to-air missiles
- 8 × MBDA MM40 Exocet anti-ship missile launchers
- 2 × triple torpedo launchers

Electronic warfare & decoys for Egypt's Gowind 2500:

- Vigile 200 Tactical R-ESM System
- Altesse Naval C-ESM
- Sylena MK2 decoy launcher system

=== Gowind 3100 ===
The Gowind 3100 is a frigate with the displacement of 3,100 tons and length of 111 metres (364 ft 2 in). It is armed with:

- 1 × Bofors 57 mm main gun
- 2 × MSI DS30M 30 mm cannon
- 16 × VLS for MBDA VL MICA surface-to-air missiles
- 8 × Atmaca anti-ship missile launchers
- 2 × triple torpedo launcher

== Operators ==
=== Egypt ===
In 2014, Egypt signed a €1bn contract with Naval Group to buy four Gowind 2,500-ton corvettes with an option for two more. Separately, MBDA negotiated a contract to equip the ships with MICA vertical launch air-defense missiles and MM40 Block 3 Exocet anti-ship missiles, together worth an additional 400 million euros, while Naval Group negotiated a 100–200 million euro contract for torpedoes. Three of the corvettes are to be built locally by Alexandria Shipyard within a technology transfer agreement. It was apparently President Abdel Fattah el-Sisi who decided these were the ships he wanted rather than the Meko A200 being offered by German group ThyssenKrupp Marine Systems (TKMS) or the Sigma corvette proposed by Damen of the Netherlands. Egypt is in talks with France to acquire another two Gowind corvettes which, if ordered, would be produced by France in Lorient.

In April 2015, Naval Group started cutting metal for the very first Gowind 2500 corvette, with a planned construction period of 29 months. It is the first of a series of four units that will be delivered to Egypt before 2019. The corvette's first block was laid in the dry dock in September 2015. Naval Group celebrated the launch of the first Egyptian Gowind corvette El Fateh at the Lorient naval shipyard in September 2016. El Fateh successfully concluded its first sea trials by the end of March 2017. The Egyptian Navy took delivery of the vessel in September 2017, three years after the order was placed.

Alexandria Shipyard started cutting metal for the second Gowind corvette intended for the Egyptian Navy in April 2016. It is the first corvette to be built locally in Egypt. Naval Group sent supervision and technical assistance teams, technical data and necessary components to Alexandria for assisting Egypt in the local construction of the three corvettes. The company also provided training for the Egyptian staff at its site in Lorient. All the Panoramic Sensors and Intelligence Modules (PSIM) were produced and tested in Lorient by Naval Group and later shipped to Alexandria for installation on the corvettes. The launching ceremony of the second Gowind corvette Port Said took place in September 2018 in Alexandria.

Construction work on the third vessel has already started. Its first block was laid in the dry dock by July 2018.

Name	Hull number	Laid down	Launched	Commissioned	Homeport
El Fateh	971	30 September 2015	17 September 2016	22 September 2017	Alexandria
Port Said	976	16 April 2016	7 September 2018	11 Jan 2021	Alexandria
El Moez	981	July 2018	12 May 2019		
Luxor	986	TBA	14 May 2020		

=== Malaysia ===
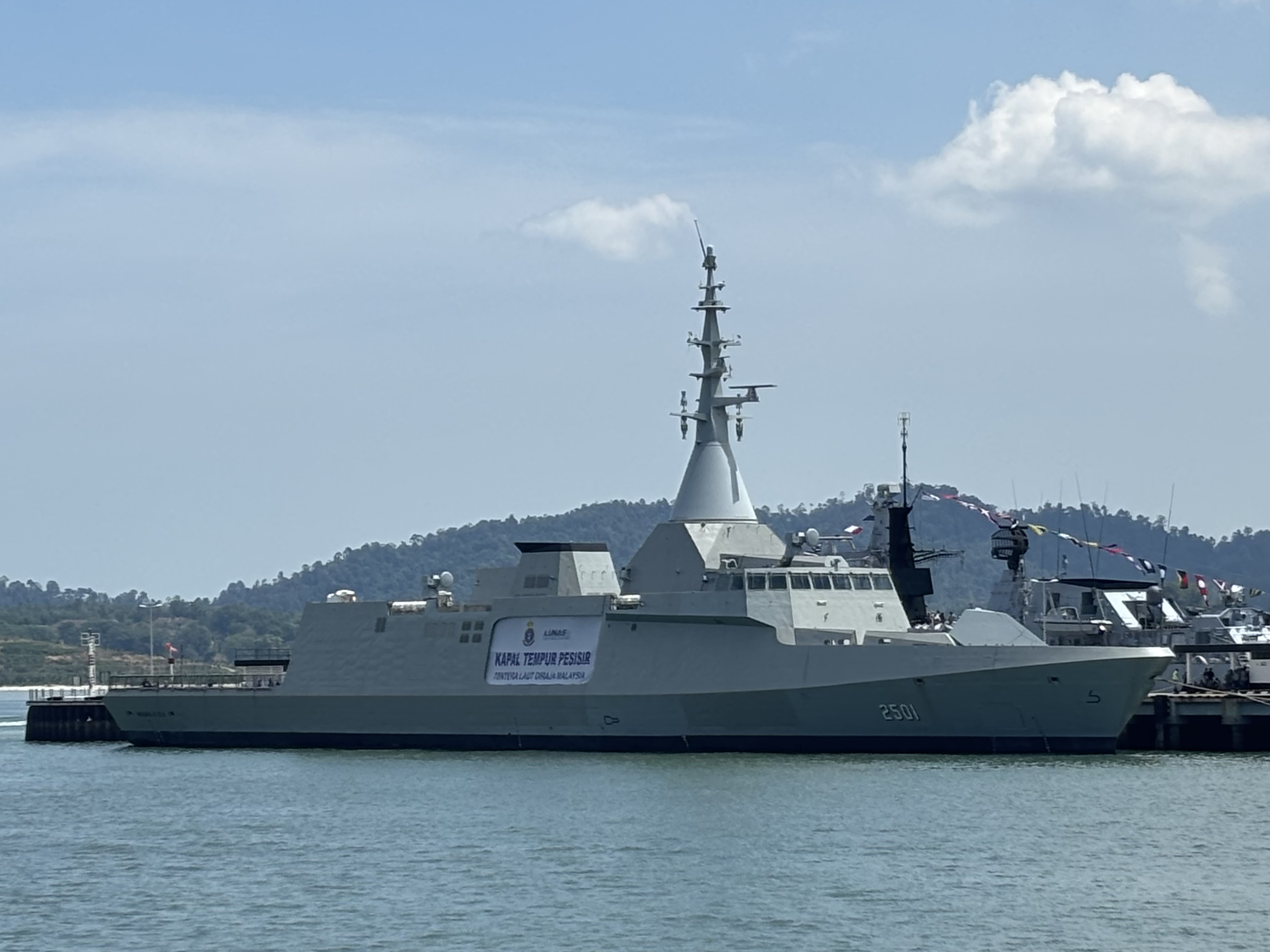
Maharaja Lela of Royal Malaysian Navy during open day in 2026

Malaysia is locally designing and building six stealth frigates displacing 3,100 tons and length 111 meter based on the design of the Gowind corvette. In 2023, it is confirmed that Malaysia will only build five instead of six ship after the sixth ship were cancelled.

Name	Pennant number	Builders	Laid down	Launched	Commissioned	Homeport	Notes
Maharaja Lela	2501	BHIC / Lumut Naval Shipyard	8 March 2016	24 August 2017	December 2026		
Raja Muda Nala	2502	BHIC / Lumut Naval Shipyard	28 February 2017	9 May 2025	August 2027		
Sharif Mashor	2503	BHIC / Lumut Naval Shipyard	18 December 2017	10 February 2026			
Mat Salleh	2504	BHIC / Lumut Naval Shipyard	31 October 2018				
Tok Janggut	2505	BHIC / Lumut Naval Shipyard	TBA				
Mat Kilau	Cancelled						

=== Argentina ===
Argentina chose the OPV variant (Kership design). After repeated negotiations and break-offs. In February 2018 the Argentine Navy was instructed to restart negotiations with Naval Group for the procurement of four Gowind-class vessels. The decision was motivated by the meeting between Argentine President Mauricio Macri and French President Emmanuel Macron at the annual World Economic Forum summit in Davos, Switzerland. An order for four vessels was expected in July 2018. In November 2018, Argentina confirmed the purchase of four Gowind-class vessels. The purchase includes the already-built L'Adroit, which in 2016 visited the region on a marketing trip and three new vessels.

Name	Hull number	Laid down	Launched	Commissioned	Homeport
Bouchard	51	2010	2011	2012 (French service); 2019 (Argentine service)	Mar del Plata
Piedrabuena	52	2019	4 July 2020	13 April 2021	Mar del Plata
Almirante Storni	53	2019	10 May 2021	13 October 2021	Mar del Plata
Bartolomé Cordero	54	2020	21 September 2021	11 July 2022	Mar del Plata

=== United Arab Emirates ===
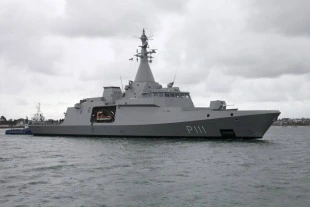
Al Emarat arriving in India ahead of the International Fleet Review 2026

On March 25, 2019, the United Arab Emirates Navy had signed a contract with Naval Group worth Euro 750 million (USD850m) for two 2500 class frigates (actually weighing 2,700 tonnes) with options for two more to be built in partnership with Abu Dhabi Ship Building Company (ADSB). They will be equipped with Naval Group's SETIS combat management system, MBDA's Exocet missile and VL MICA-NG missiles. This contract was announced in mid-June 2019 by Naval Group.

Name	Hull number	Laid down	Launched	Commissioned	Homeport
Bani Yas	P110	2020	4 December 2021	29 November 2023	Mina Zayed naval base
Al Emarat	P111	2020	13 May 2022	27 June 2024	Mina Zayed naval base

== Cancelled ==
=== Romania ===
In July 2019, Naval Group won a €1.2 billion contract, which included the construction of four new Gowind multi-mission corvettes for the Romanian Navy. Naval Group was due to build the first corvette within three years while the remaining three corvettes were to be constructed by Constanța Shipyard and delivered before 2026. The contract was cancelled by Romanian Ministry of Defence on 8 August 2023, following disagreements on the price of constructing the corvettes. Romania later committed to buying Hisar class corvettes from Türkiye.

== Potential operators ==
=== Indonesia ===
In January 2020, the Indonesian Minister of Defence Prabowo Subianto during a bilateral meeting in France with his French counterpart Florence Parly said the Indonesian Ministry is interested in French military equipment; including 36 Dassault Rafale aircraft, Scorpène submarines and 2 Gowind corvettes. On 7 June 2021, Indonesia signed a letter of intent to buy two Gowind corvettes from France.

=== Greece ===
As of 2021, Greece is interested in 5 Gowind 2800HN corvettes based on the Gowind 2500 for the Hellenic Navy as part of a $5 billion defence package.

== See also ==
- List of frigate classes in service
- List of corvette classes in service
- Littoral combat ship
- MILGEM project

Equivalent warship designs of the same era

- MEKO
- SIGMA
