= KD Raja Muda Nala =

Malaysian Navy Lela-class frigate

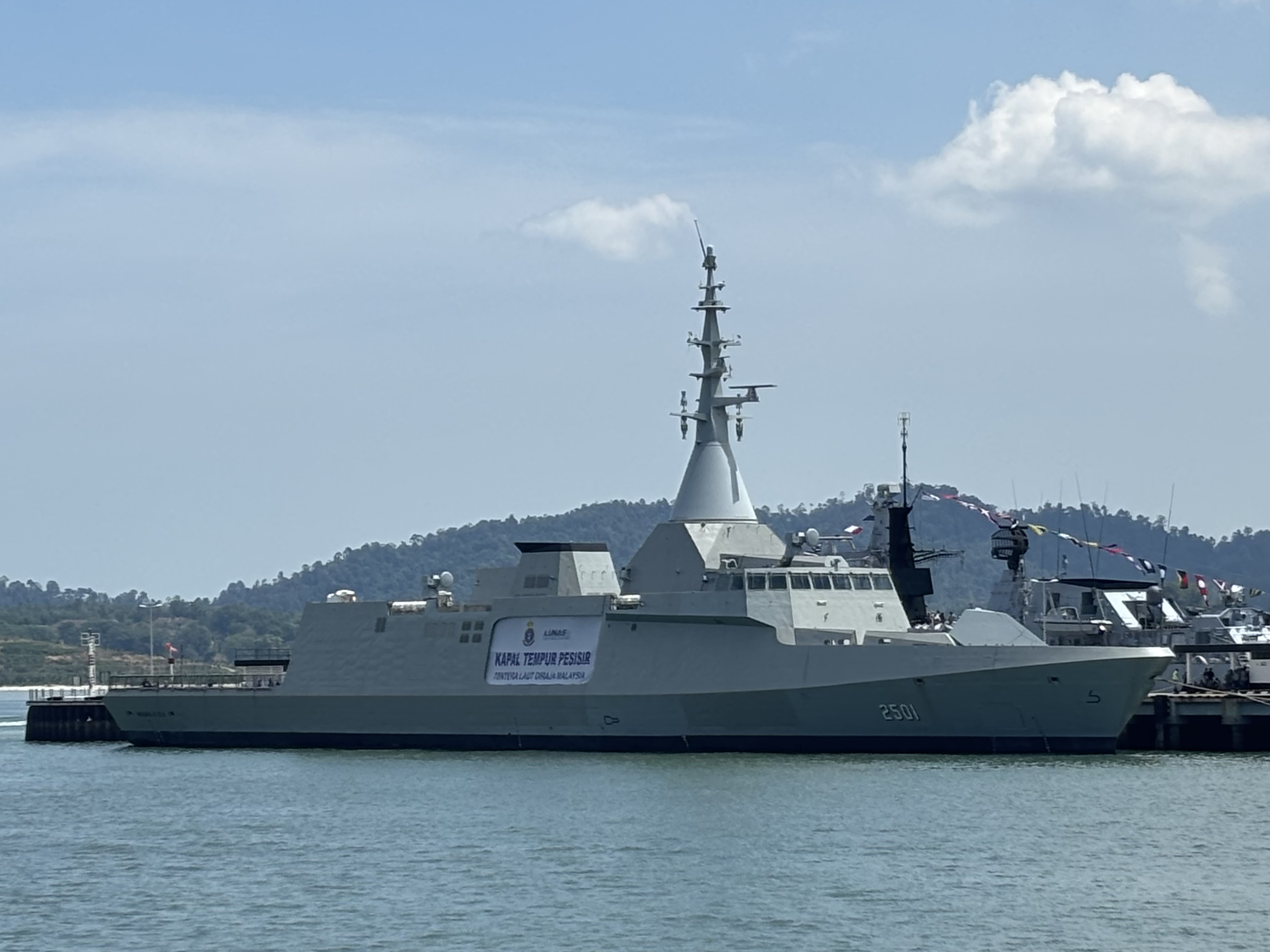
- Lead ship of the class, KD Maharaja Lela.

History

Malaysia
- Name: KD Raja Muda Nala
- Namesake: Raja Muda Nala
- Builder: Boustead Heavy Industries Corporation / Lumut Naval Shipyard (Primary shipbuilder); Naval Group (Design authority)
- Laid down: 28 February 2017
- Launched: 9 May 2025
- Identification: Hull number: 2502
- Status: Launched

General characteristics
- Class & type: Maharaja Lela-class frigate
- Displacement: 3,100 long tons (3,150 t) full load
- Length: 111 m (364 ft 2 in)
- Beam: 16 m (52 ft 6 in)
- Draught: 3.85 m (12 ft 8 in)
- Propulsion: CODAD 4 x MTU 20V 1163 M94, each rated at 7,400 kW (9,925 shp), total output: 29,600 kW (39,694 shp)
- Speed: 28 knots (52 km/h)
- Range: 5,000 nautical miles (9,300 km) at 15 knots (28 km/h)
- Complement: 138
- Sensors & processing systems: Combat system: Naval Group SETIS; Search radar: Thales SMART-S Mk2; Fire control radar: Rheinmetall TMEO Mk2 electro-optical tracking system & TMX/EO Mk2; Sonar: Thales TUS ASW suite: Kingklip Mk.1 hull-mounted sonar & CAPTAS-2 towed array sonar
- Electronic warfare & decoys: RESM: Thales Vigile; DLS: Wallop's Super Barricade decoy launching system
- Armament: Guns: 1 × Bofors 57 mm gun; 2 × MSI DS30M 30 mm cannon; Anti-air: 16 × VL MICA in Sylver VLS; Anti-ship: 8 × Atmaca; Anti-submarine: 2 × triple J+S torpedo launcher
- Aircraft carried: Various types of UAVs and helicopters, weighing up to 10 tons
- Aviation facilities: Stern hangar and helicopter landing platform

KD Raja Muda Nala is the second ship of the Maharaja Lela-class frigates built locally, in Malaysia, by Boustead Heavy Industries Corporation, and later Lumut Naval Shipyard. It was built based on enlarged version of Naval Group's Gowind-class design. The ship is named after Raja Muda Nala, one of Sultan Salehuddin Shah's prince and Selangor warrior. During the early construction of the ship, it was destined to use the name of Syarif Masahor but the name changed when the construction was about 70% complete.

== Development ==
Under a contract valued of RM9 billion, BHIC was contracted to build a total of six of this class for RMN. Like her sister ships, Raja Muda Nala has a length of 111 metres (364 ft 2 in), a beam of 16 metres (52 ft 6 in) and a draught of 3.85 metres (12 ft 8 in). The ship has displacement of 3,100 tonnes and a complement of 138. As for the weapon systems, she equipped with one Bofors 57 mm gun and two MSI DS30M 30 mm cannon. There was 16 Sylver VLS allocated on the deck of the ship for the VL MICA and 8 Atmaca anti-ship missile for anti-surface warfare. For the anti-submarine capabilities, the ship equipped with two J+S fixed triple torpedo launcher.
