= ENS Port Said =

Gowind-class corvette of the Egyptian Navy

History

Egypt
- Name: Port Said; (بورسعيد)
- Namesake: Port Said
- Ordered: 2014 June
- Builder: Alexandria Shipyard, Alexandria
- Cost: €250M (2014) (excluding weapon systems); €100M Exocet & MICA missiles; €25M-€50M torpedoes
- Laid down: 16 April 2016
- Launched: 7 September 2018
- Commissioned: 6 January 2021
- Home port: Alexandria
- Identification: Pennant number: 976
- Status: Active

General characteristics
- Class & type: Gowind-class corvette
- Displacement: 2,600 tons
- Length: 102 m (334 ft 8 in)
- Beam: 16 m (52 ft 6 in)
- Propulsion: CODED (combined diesel-electric and diesel-mechanical); 2 × Leroy-Somer diesel-electric engines; 2 × MTU diesel engines; 10MW
- Speed: 25 knots (46 km/h; 29 mph)
- Range: 3,700 nmi (6,900 km; 4,300 mi) at 15 knots (28 km/h; 17 mph)
- Endurance: 21 days
- Complement: 80 (65 sailors + 15 special forces)
- Sensors & processing systems: Naval Group's SETIS® combat management system; Thales Nederlands' SMART-S Mk.2 3D radar; Thales TUS' CAPTAS-2 variable depth towed sonar
- Electronic warfare & decoys: VIGILE 200 Tactical R-ESM System; ALTESSE Naval C-ESM
- Armament: 1 × OTO Melara 76 mm maingun; 2 × Nexter Narwhal 20 mm RWS cannons; 16 × VL MICA-M short-range SAMs; 8 × Exocet MM40 block-3 antiship cruise missiles; 2 × triple-tubed torpedo launchers
- Aircraft carried: 1 × 5-tons helicopter or 1 × 10-tons helicopter (supported); Schiebel Camcopter S-100
- Aviation facilities: Hangar and helipad

ENS Port Said (976) is the second ship of Egyptian Gowind-class corvette of the Egyptian Navy.

== Development and design ==
In 2014, Egypt signed a €1bn contract with Naval Group to buy four Gowind 2,500-ton corvettes with an option for two more. Separately, MBDA negotiated a contract to equip the ships with MICA vertical launch air-defense missiles and MM40 Block 3 Exocet anti-ship missiles, together worth an additional 400 million euros, while Naval Group negotiated a 100–200 million euro contract for torpedoes. Three of the corvettes are to be built locally by Alexandria Shipyardwithin a technology transfer agreement. It was apparently President Abdel Fattah el-Sisi who decided these were the ships he wanted rather than the Meko A200 being offered by German group ThyssenKrupp Marine Systems (TKMS) or the Sigma corvette proposed by Damen of the Netherlands. Egypt is in talks with France to acquire another two Gowind corvettes which, if ordered, would be produced by France in Lorient.

In April 2015, Naval Group started cutting metal for the very first Gowind 2500 corvette, with a planned construction period of 29 months. It is the first of a series of four units that will be delivered to Egypt before 2019. The corvette's first block was laid in the dry dock in September 2015. Naval Group celebrated the launch of the first Egyptian Gowind corvette El Fateh at the Lorient naval shipyard in September 2016. El Fateh successfully concluded its first sea trials by the end of March 2017. The Egyptian Navy took delivery of the vessel in September 2017, three years after the order was placed.

== Construction and career ==
Port Said was laid down on 16 April 2016 and launched on 7 September 2018 by Alexandria Shipyard in Alexandria.
