= KD Maharaja Lela =

Lead ship of the Malaysian Maharaja Lela-class frigates

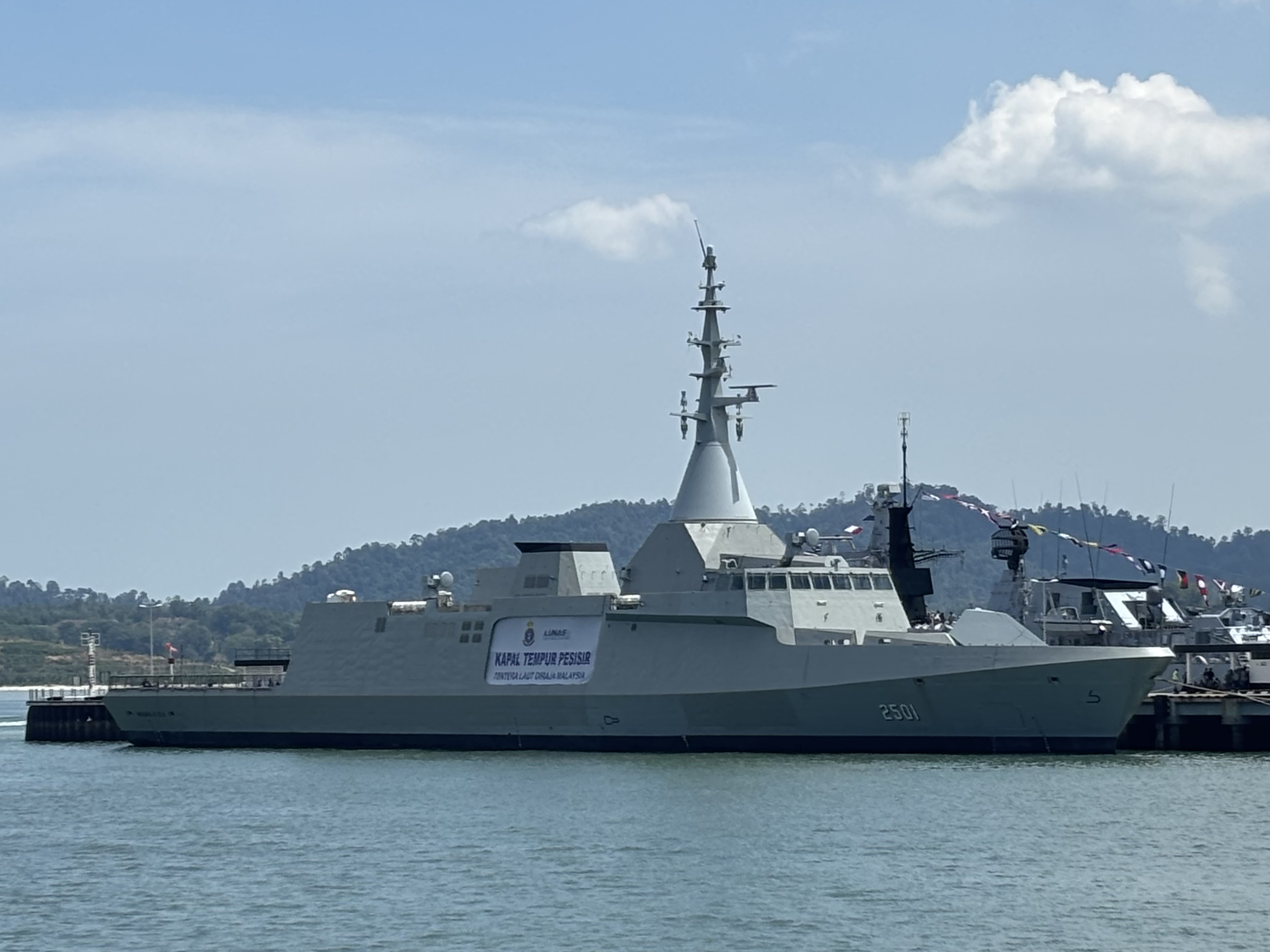
- KD Maharajalela docking at Lumut Naval Base during the base open day in May 2026. The ship was not yet commissioned.

History

Malaysia
- Name: KD Maharaja Lela
- Namesake: Dato Maharaja Lela
- Builder: Boustead Heavy Industries Corporation / Lumut Naval Shipyard (Primary shipbuilder); Naval Group (Design authority)
- Laid down: 8 March 2016
- Launched: 24 August 2017
- Identification: Hull number: 2501
- Status: Sea trials

General characteristics
- Class & type: Maharaja Lela-class frigate
- Displacement: 3,100 long tons (3,150 t) full load
- Length: 111 m (364 ft 2 in)
- Beam: 16 m (52 ft 6 in)
- Draught: 3.85 m (12 ft 8 in)
- Propulsion: CODAD 4 x MTU 20V 1163 M94, each rated at 7,400 kW (9,925 shp), total output: 29,600 kW (39,694 shp)
- Speed: 28 knots (52 km/h)
- Range: 5,000 nautical miles (9,300 km) at 15 knots (28 km/h)
- Complement: 138
- Sensors & processing systems: Combat system: Naval Group SETIS; Search radar: Thales SMART-S Mk2; Fire control radar: Rheinmetall TMEO Mk2 electro-optical tracking system & TMX/EO Mk2; Sonar: Thales TUS ASW suite: Kingklip Mk.1 hull-mounted sonar & CAPTAS-2 towed array sonar
- Electronic warfare & decoys: RESM: Thales Vigile; DLS: Wallop Super Barricade decoy launching system
- Armament: Guns: 1 × Bofors 57 mm gun; 2 × MSI DS30M 30 mm cannon; Anti-air: 16 × VL MICA in Sylver VLS; Anti-ship: 8 × Atmaca; Anti-submarine: 2 × triple J+S torpedo launcher
- Aircraft carried: Various types of UAVs and helicopters, weighing up to 10 tons
- Aviation facilities: Stern hangar and helicopter landing platform

KD Maharaja Lela is the lead ship of Maharaja Lela-class frigate built locally by Boustead Heavy Industries Corporation (BHIC), and later Lumut Naval Shipyard, based on enlarged version of Naval Group's Gowind-class design. She is named after Maharaja Lela, in honour of the Perak chieftain and British colonialism resistance leader, Dato Maharaja Lela.

== Development ==
Under a contract valued of RM9 billion, BHIC was contracted to build a total of six class of this ship for RMN. Each of the ships are equipped with warfare capabilities for electronic, air, surface and underwater threats, integrated with state-of-the-art systems.

The ship's construction was started on 3 December 2014 with the first steel cut at the IHC Metalix facility in Kinderdijk, Netherlands. The materials were then shipped to Malaysia. Another steel cutting ceremony took place on 12 June 2015 at the then-BHIC Shipyard in Lumut, Perak. The ship was laid down on 8 March 2016.

The frigate was officially named as KD Maharaja Lela and was launched on 24 August 2017 by Queen of Perak, Tuanku Zara Salim, witnessed by Sultan of Perak Sultan Nazrin Muizzuddin Shah at the BHIC Shipyard in Lumut, Perak. Maharaja Lela sailed underway on her own power for the first time on 28 January 2026 during her sea trials.
