= ENS El Fateh =

Gowind-class corvette of the Egyptian Navy

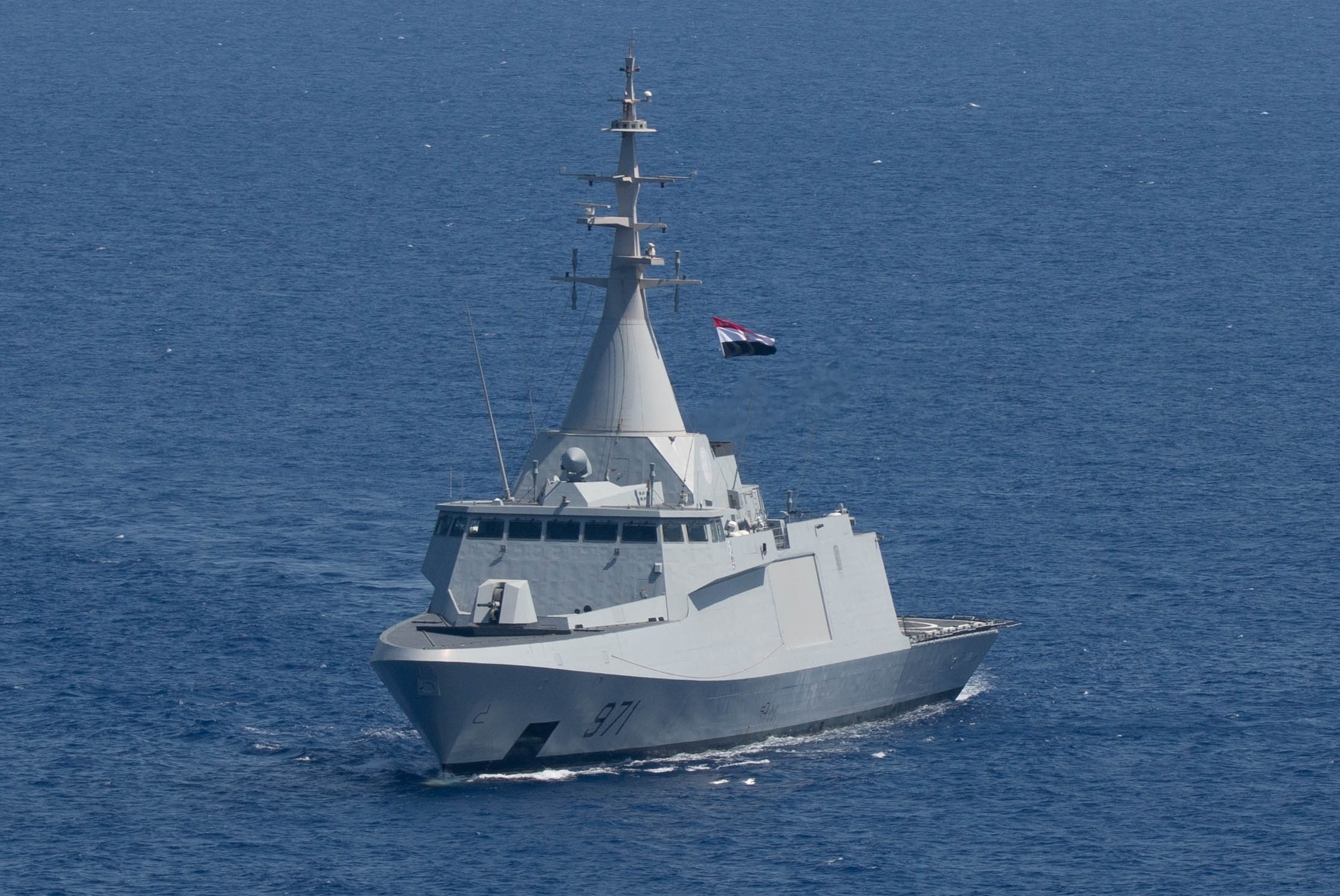
- El Fateh in August 2022

History

Egypt
- Name: El Fateh; (الفاتح)
- Namesake: El Fateh
- Ordered: 2014
- Builder: DCNS, Lorient
- Laid down: 30 September 2015
- Launched: 17 September 2016
- Commissioned: 22 September 2017
- Home port: Alexandria
- Identification: MMSI number: 622121045; Callsign: SUEP; Pennant number: 971
- Status: Active

General characteristics
- Class & type: Gowind-class corvette
- Displacement: 2,500 tons
- Length: 102 m (334 ft 8 in)
- Beam: 16 m (52 ft 6 in)
- Propulsion: CODED (combined diesel-electric and diesel-mechanical)
- Speed: 25 knots (46 km/h; 29 mph)
- Range: 3,700 nmi (6,900 km; 4,300 mi) at 15 knots (28 km/h; 17 mph)
- Endurance: 21 days
- Complement: 65 + 15 Special forces
- Sensors & processing systems: Naval Group's SETIS combat management system; Thales Nederlands' SMART-S Mk.2 3D radar; Thales TUS' CAPTAS-2 variable depth sonar
- Electronic warfare & decoys: VIGILE 200 Tactical R-ESM System; ALTESSE Naval C-ESM
- Armament: 1 × OTO Melara 76 mm main gun; 2 × Nexter Narwhal 20 mm RWS cannons; 16 × VLS for VL MICA-M SRSAMs; 8 × Exocet MM-40 Block-3 antiship cruise missiles; 2 × triple-tubed torpedo launchers
- Aircraft carried: 1 × 5-tons helicopter or 1 × 10-tons helicopter (supported); Schiebel Camcopter S-100
- Aviation facilities: Hangar and helipad

ENS El Fateh (971) is the lead ship of Egyptian Gowind-class corvette of the Egyptian Navy. She was commissioned on 22 September 2017.

== Development and design ==
The name El Fateh was originally first carried by the former British destroyer HMS Zenith (R95), acquired by the Egyptian Navy in 1955. The name was transferred to the new Gowind-class ship in September 2017, and the status of the former Zenith is now unclear.

In 2014, Egypt signed a €1bn contract with Naval Group to buy four Gowind 2,500-ton corvettes with an option for two more. Separately, MBDA negotiated a contract to equip the ships with MICA vertical launch air-defense missiles and MM40 Block 3 Exocet anti-ship missiles, together worth an additional 400 million euros, while Naval Group negotiated a 100–200 million euro contract for torpedoes. Three of the corvettes are to be built locally by Alexandria Shipyardwithin a technology transfer agreement. It was apparently President Abdel Fattah el-Sisi who decided these were the ships he wanted rather than the Meko A200 being offered by German group ThyssenKrupp Marine Systems (TKMS) or the Sigma corvette proposed by Damen of the Netherlands. Egypt is in talks with France to acquire another two Gowind corvettes which, if ordered, would be produced by France in Lorient.

In April 2015, Naval Group started cutting metal for the very first Gowind 2500 corvette, with a planned construction period of 29 months. It is the first of a series of four units that will be delivered to Egypt before 2019. The corvette's first block was laid in the dry dock in September 2015. Naval Group celebrated the launch of the first Egyptian Gowind corvette El Fateh at the Lorient naval shipyard in September 2016. El Fateh successfully concluded its first sea trials by the end of March 2017. The Egyptian Navy took delivery of the vessel in September 2017, three years after the order was placed.

== Construction and career ==
El Fateh was laid down on 30 September 2015 and launched on 17 September 2016 by DCNS in Lorient. She was commissioned on 22 September 2017.
