= Lela Pandak Lam =

Chief and rebel from Perak (died 1877)

Dato Maharaja Lela
- Died: 20 January 1877; Taiping, Perak
- Cause of death: Execution by hanging
- Known for: Assassination of James W. W. Birch, and involvement in the Perak War

Lela Pandak Lam (died 20 January 1877), better known as Dato Maharaja Lela, was a tribal chief from Perak, who is known for his assassination of James W. W. Birch, the British Resident of Perak, on 2 November 1875. He was a local leader who later led the struggle against British forces in Perak. Together with other leaders such as Dato' Sagor, he planned an alliance to assassinate James W. W. Birch and resist the British in Perak. His decision was approved in a meeting at Durian Sebatang, chaired by Sultan Abdullah on 21 July 1875.

== Early life ==
A descendant of Daeng Salili, Pandak Lam was the son of a Bugis king from Luwuk District, Sulawesi. During the reign of Sultan Muzaffar Shah III, he came to Perak and was appointed Mufti and awarded the title "Dato Maharaja Lela".

== Assassination of Birch ==
On 2 November 1875, Dato Maharaja Lela and his assistant Sepuntum speared the British Resident of Perak, James W. W. Birch to death as Birch was taking a bath by a river near Pasir Salak, which is located somewhere near today's Teluk Intan (Teluk Anson). Birch's murder led the British army to attack Pasir Salak, and following several days of battle, the leaders of the rebellion surrendered. In a subsequent trial held between 14 and 22 December in Matang, Sultan Abdullah and Ngah Ibrahim were deposed and sent to exile in Seychelles. Dato Maharaja Lela was found guilty of the murder of Birch and sentenced to death. He was executed by hanging on 20 January 1877 in Taiping. In the wake of the incident, the British administration was shifted to Taiping.

There is debate over the reason for Birch's assassination. One view is that he was assassinated because he outlawed slavery in Perak. Dato Maharaja Lela, whose income depended on capturing and selling the natives of Perak or Orang Asli as slaves, was incensed and plotted with some of the slave-traders to kill Birch. However, He is generally celebrated as a folk hero by Malay nationalists and seen as a symbol of Malay resistance against British colonialism and the first stirrings of early nationalism.

== Legacy ==
=== Memorials and eponyms ===
Several places and things were named after Dato Maharaja Lela:

- Jalan Maharajalela, Kuala Lumpur
- Maharajalela station
- KD Maharaja Lela

== See also ==
- Rentap, Iban hero in Sarawak
- Rosli Dhobi, a Malay Sarawakian who killed Sir Duncan Stewart
- Sharif Masahor
