= List of aircraft carrier classes in service =

The list of aircraft carrier classes in service includes all those currently with navies or armed forces and auxiliaries in the world. Ships are grouped by type, and listed alphabetically within.

== Kuznetsov-class (Project 1143.5) aircraft carrier ==
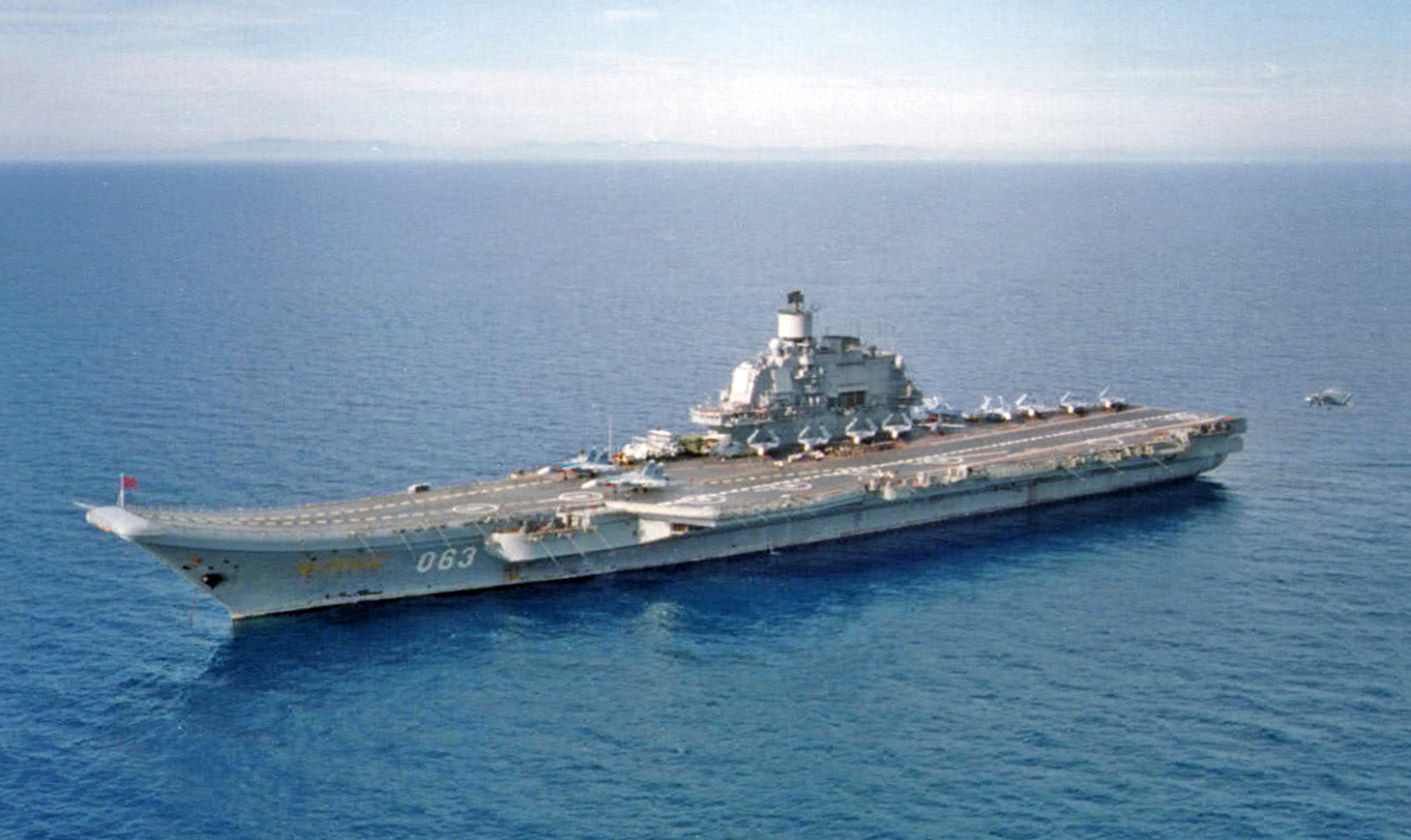
Admiral Kuznetsov

- Builders: Soviet Union (Black Sea Shipyard in Mykolaiv, present-day Ukraine)
- Displacement: 57,700 tons
- Aircraft: 17 fixed-wing aircraft and 24 helicopters
- Armament: 12 × P-700 Granit SSM; 192 × Tor SAM; 8 × CADS-1 CIWS; 8 × AK-630; 2 × RBU-12000
- Powerplant: 8 boilers, 4 steam turbines (200,000 shp)
- Speed: 32 knots
- Range: 3,850 nmi at 32 knots
- Ships in class: 3
- Operator: Russian Navy, People's Liberation Army Navy
- Commissioned: 1995
- Status: 2 in service in China, 1 more in long-term refit in Russia

== Cavour-class aircraft carrier ==
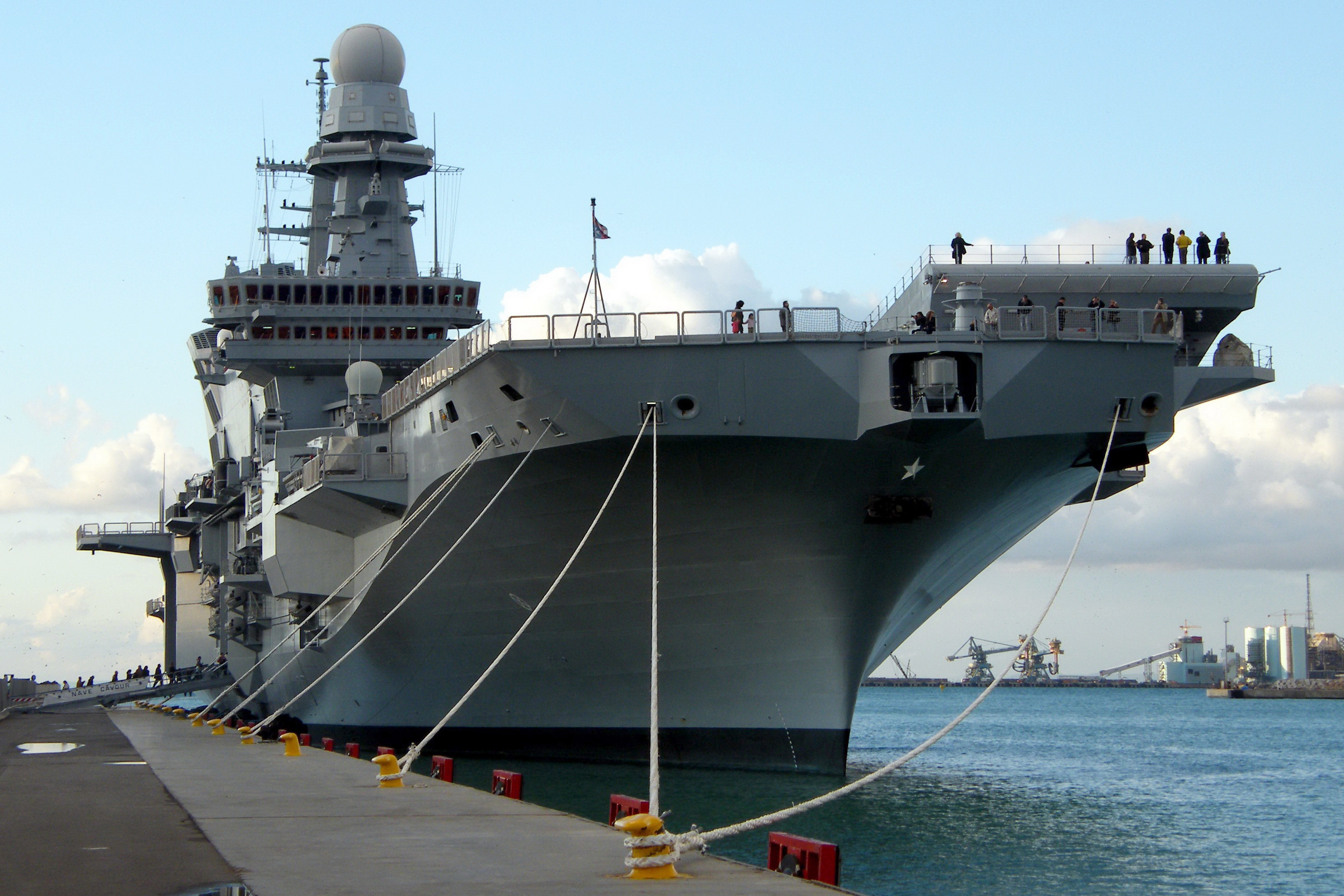
Conte di Cavour

- Builders: Italy
- Type: Aircraft carrier
- Displacement: 27,910 tons
- Aircraft: 8 AV-8B Harrier II Plus, 12 EH101 helicopters
- Armament: 4 × A43 SYLVER VLS for 32 Aster 15 SAM, 2 × Otobreda 76 mm gun Davide Strales, 3 × Oerlikon Contraves 25/80 mm Anti-asymmetric attack warfare gun
- Powerplant: 4 × General Electric/Avio LM2500+ gas turbines, 2 shafts, 88.000 KW, 6 × Diesel generators (13.200 KW)
- Speed 29+ knots
- Ships in class: 1
- Operator: Marina Militare
- Commissioned: 2008
- Status: In service

== Chakri Naruebet-class aircraft carrier ==
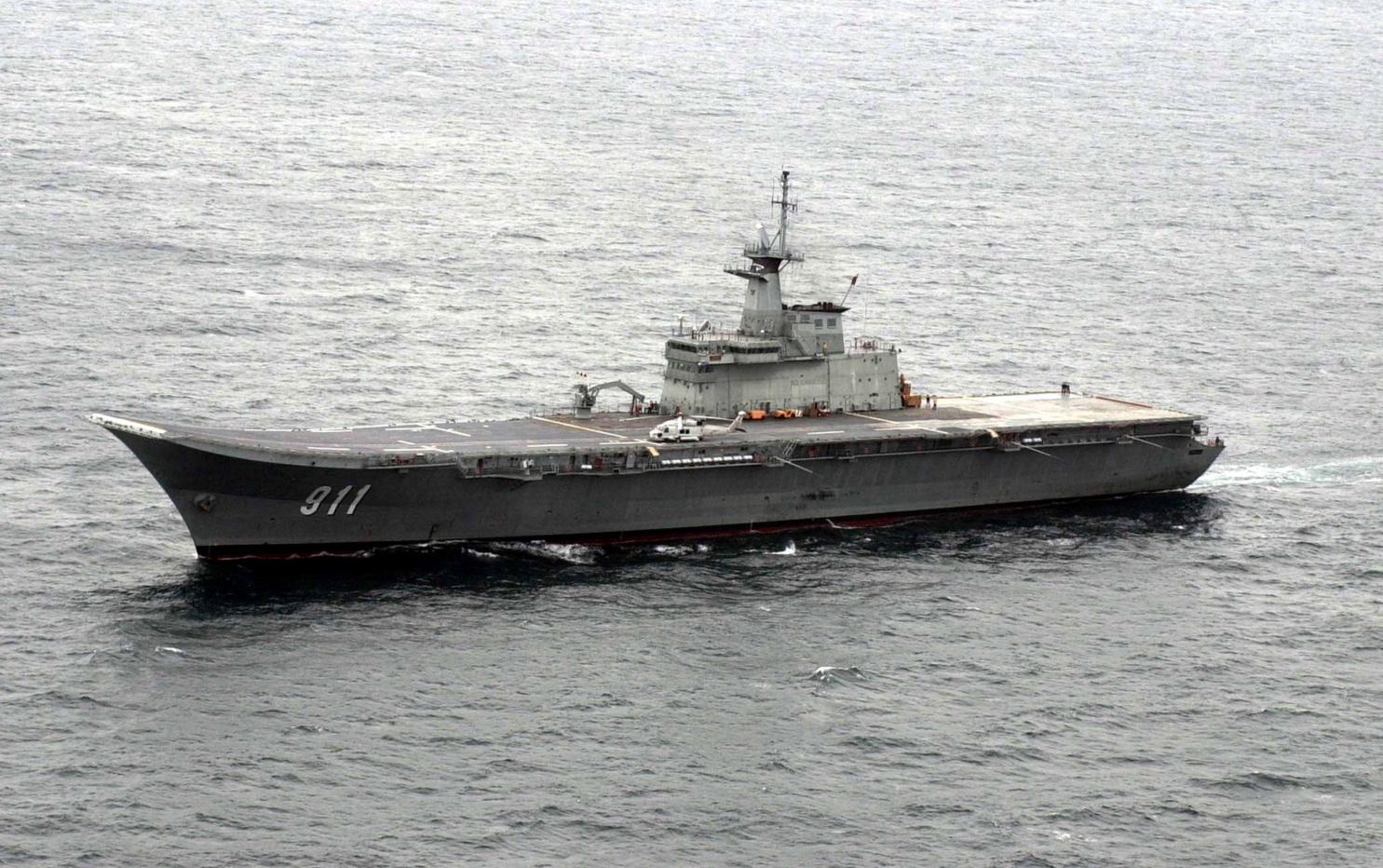
Chakri Naruebet

- Builders: Spain
- Displacement: 11,486 tons
- Aircraft: 6 AV-8 Harrier II aircraft and 4 S-70B Seahawk helicopter
- Armament: 2 × hex Sadral Mistral SAM launchers, 2x12.7 mm MG
- Powerplant: 2 diesels, 2 gas turbines, 2 shafts, 44,250 hp
- Speed: 26 knots
- Ships in class: 1
- Operator: Royal Thai Navy
- Commissioned: 10 August 1997
- Status: In service

== Charles de Gaulle-class nuclear-powered aircraft carrier ==
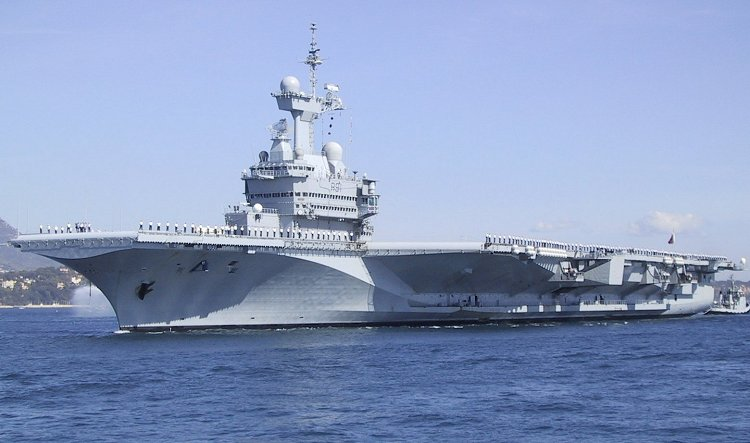
Charles de Gaulle

- Builders: France (DCN at Brest, Bretagne)
- Displacement: 40,500 tons
- Aircraft: 30 fixed-wing aircraft (Super Étendard, Rafale M) and helicopter
- Armament: 4 × SYLVER launchers (32 × Aster 15 SAM); 12 × Mistral SAM; 8 × 20 mm guns
- Powerplant: 2 × pressurized water reactors
- Speed: 27 knots
- Ships in class: 1
- Operator: Marine Nationale
- Commissioned: 18 May 2001
- Status: In service

== Gerald R. Ford-class nuclear-powered aircraft carrier ==
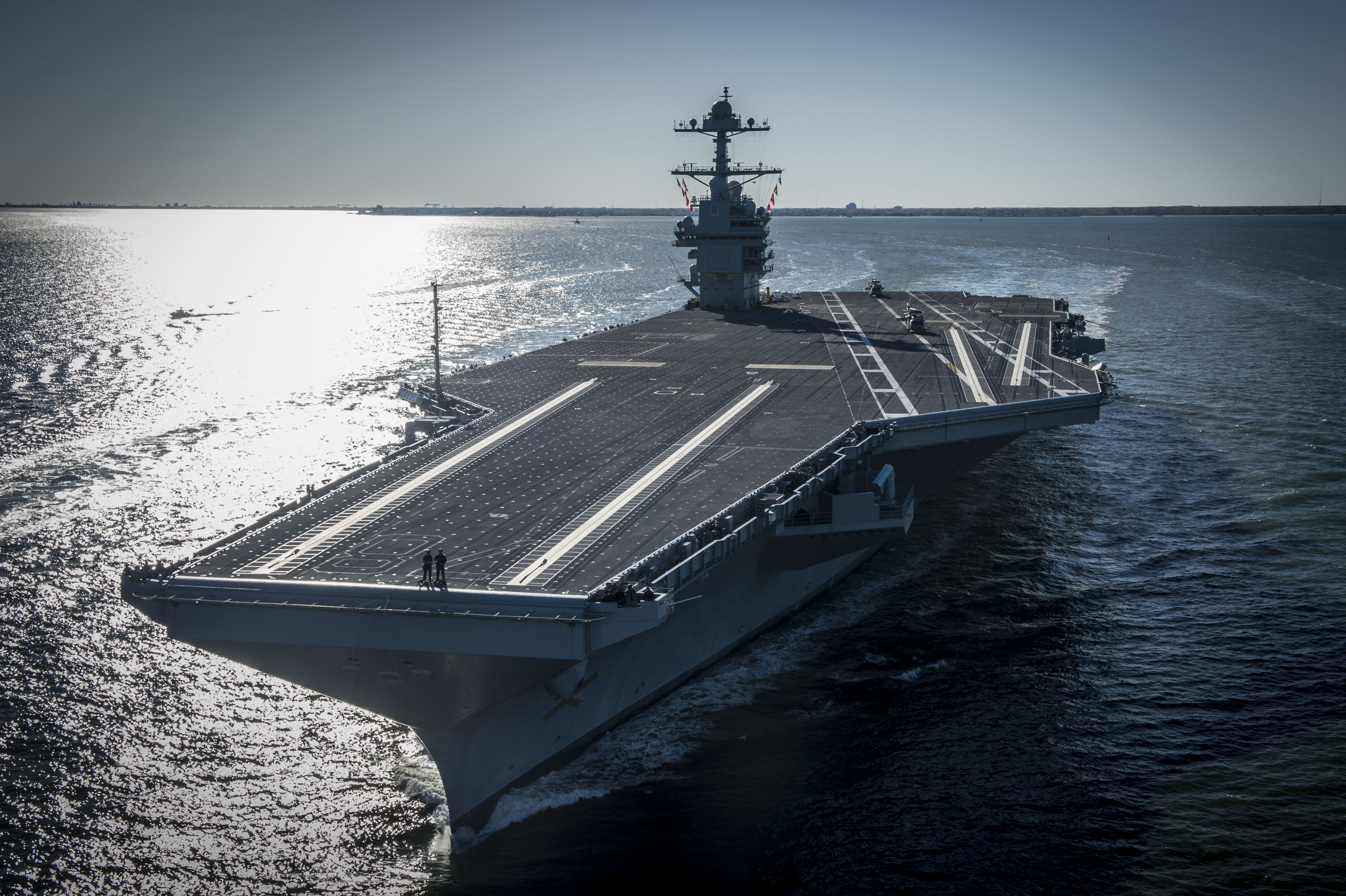
Gerald R. Ford

- Builders: United States
- Displacement: 100,000 tons
- Aircraft: 75+
- Armament: 2 × RIM-162 ESSM launchers, 2 × RIM-116 RAM, 3 × Phalanx CIWS, 4 × M2 .50 Cal. (12.7 mm) machine guns
- Powerplant: Two A1B nuclear reactors
- Speed: 30 knots
- Ships in class: 1
- Operator: United States Navy
- Commissioned: 22 Jul 2017
- Status: 1 in service, 2 under construction

== Giuseppe Garibaldi-class aircraft carrier ==
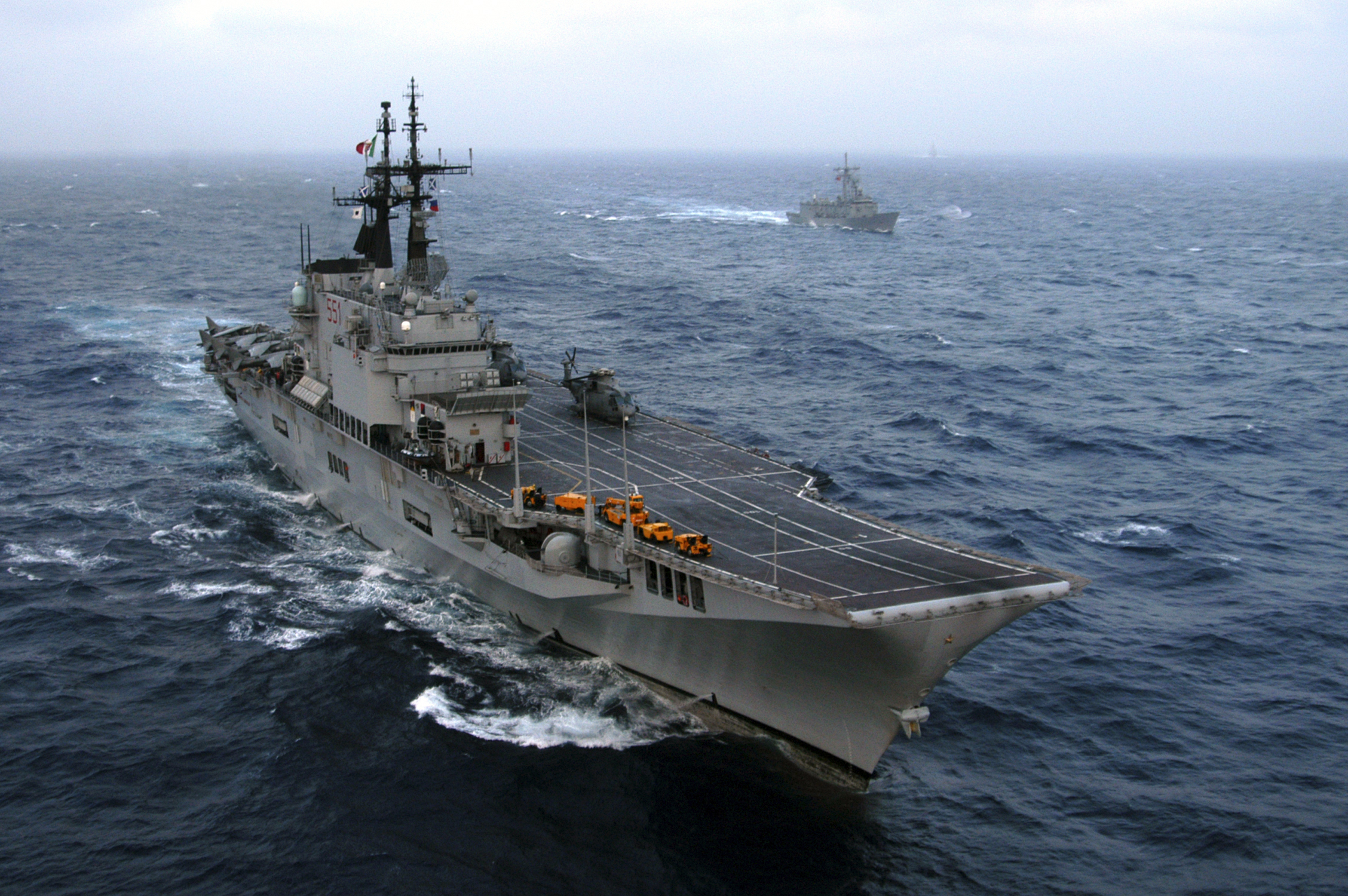
Giuseppe Garibaldi

- Builders: Italy
- Type: Aircraft carrier
- Displacement: 13,850 tons
- Aircraft: 16 AV-8B Harrier and Agusta helicopter
- Armament: MBDA Otomat SSM, Albatros Mark II Aspide SAM, 3 × Oto Melara 40 mm/70 mm twin guns, 2 triple-tube torpedo launchers
- Powerplant: 4 × General Electric/Avio LM2500 gas turbines, 2 shafts, 81,000 hp
- Speed: 30 knots
- Ships in class: 1
- Operator: Marina Militare, Indonesian Navy
- Commissioned: 1985, 2026
- Status: In service with Indonesia

== Vikrant-class aircraft carrier ==
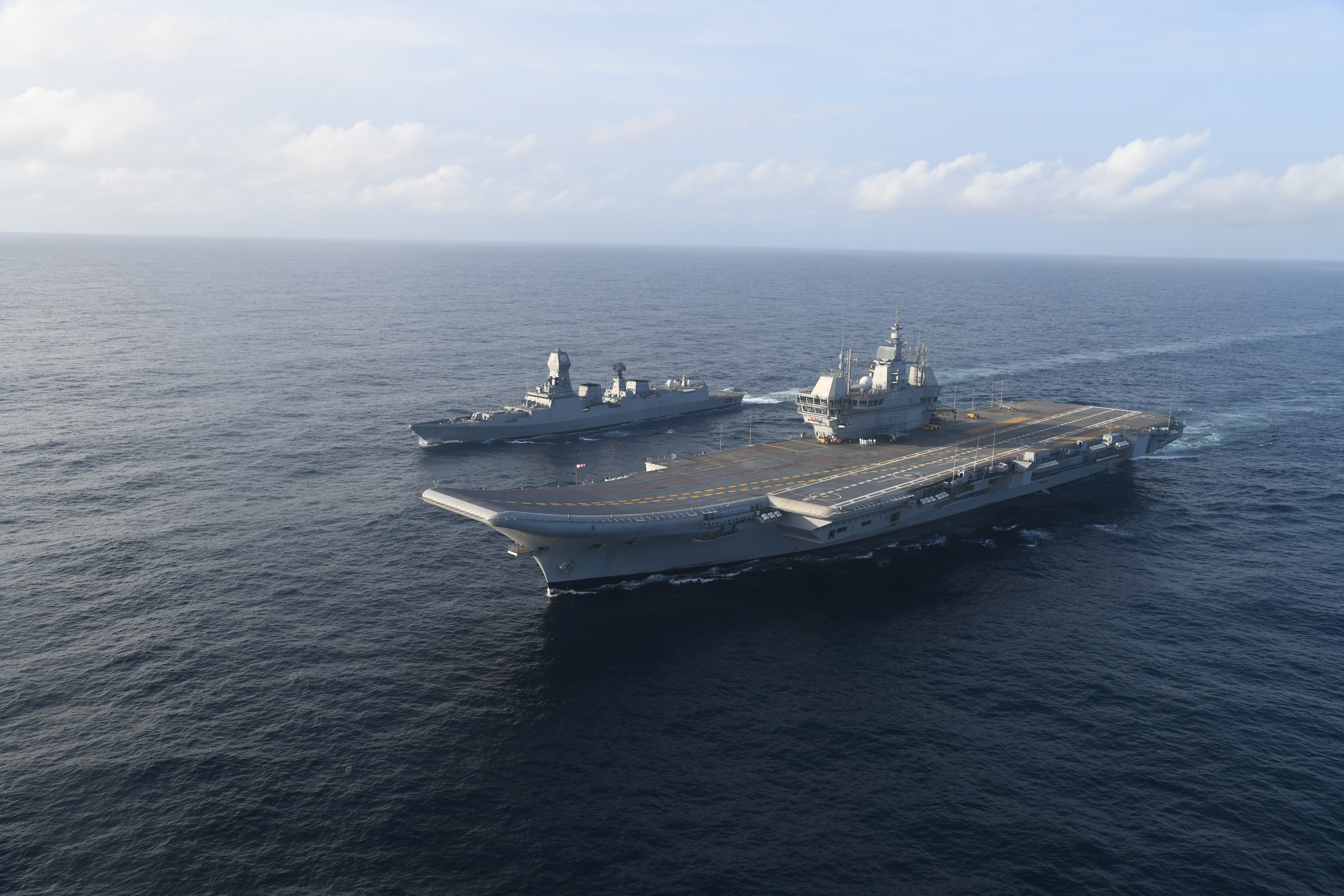
Vikrant

- Builders: India (Cochin Shipyard Limited)
- Displacement: 45,000 tons
- Aircraft: 30 × fighters and 6 × helicopters
- Armament: Barak 8 SAM, AK-630 CIWS, 4 × Otobreda 76 mm
- Propulsion: 4 × General Electric LM2500+ gas turbine, 2 × Elecon COGAG gearbox
- Speed: in excess of 30 knots
- Ships in class: 1
- Operators: Indian Navy
- Commissioned: 2 September 2022
- Status: In service

== Vikramaditya (modified Kiev)-class aircraft carrier ==
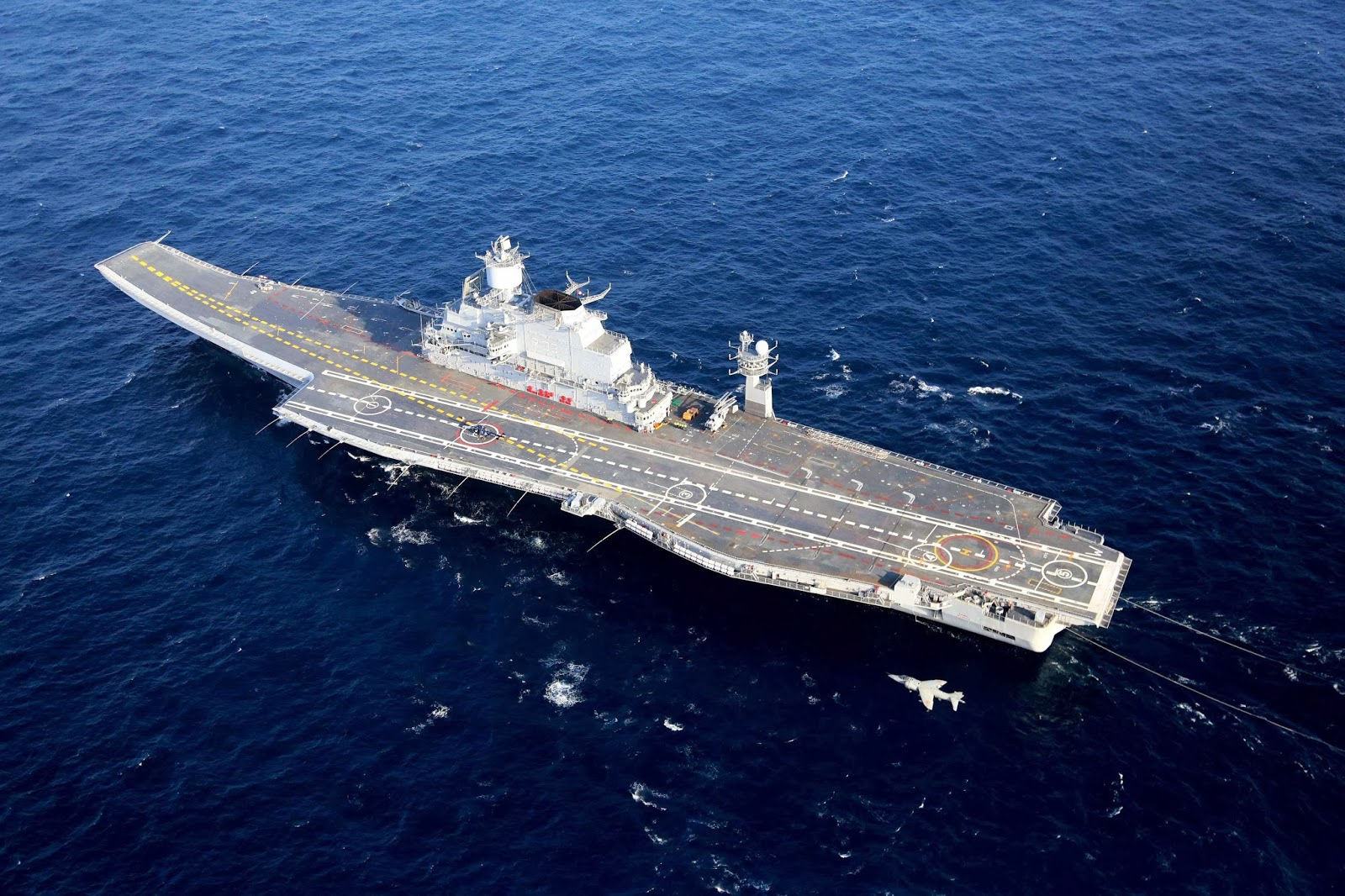
Vikramaditya

- Builders: Russia (Soviet "Baku" as Kiev-class aircraft carrier / Russia Sevmash in Severodvinsk)
- Displacement: 45,400 tons
- Aircraft: 30 × fighters and 6 × helicopters
- Armament: Barak 8 SAM, AK-630 CIWS
- Propulsion: 8 turbopressurized boilers, 4 shafts, 4 geared steam turbines, 180,000 hp
- Speed: in excess of 30 knots
- Ships in class: 1
- Operators: Indian Navy
- Commissioned: 16 December 2013
- Status: In service

== Nimitz-class nuclear-powered aircraft carrier ==
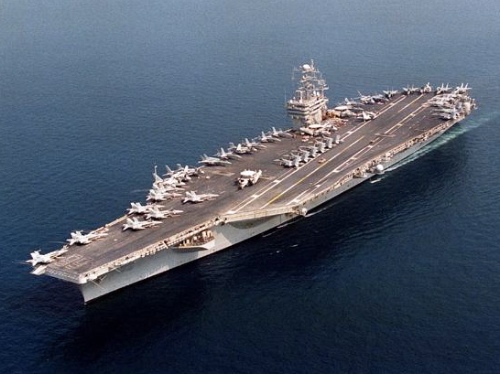
Nimitz

- Builders: United States (Northrop Grumman Newport News, Newport News, Virginia)
- Displacement: 97,000 tons
- Aircraft: 85 fixed-wing aircraft and helicopter
- Armament: 2 × RIM-162 ESSM launchers; 2 × Phalanx CIWS; 2 × RIM-116 Rolling Airframe Missile launchers, up to 4 x Mk 38 25 mm Machine Gun Systems
- Powerplant: 2 × A4W reactors, 4 × steam turbines (260,000 shp)
- Speed: 30+ knots
- Ships in class: 10
- Operator: United States Navy
- Commissioned: 3 May 1975
- Status: 10 in service

== Queen Elizabeth-class aircraft carrier ==
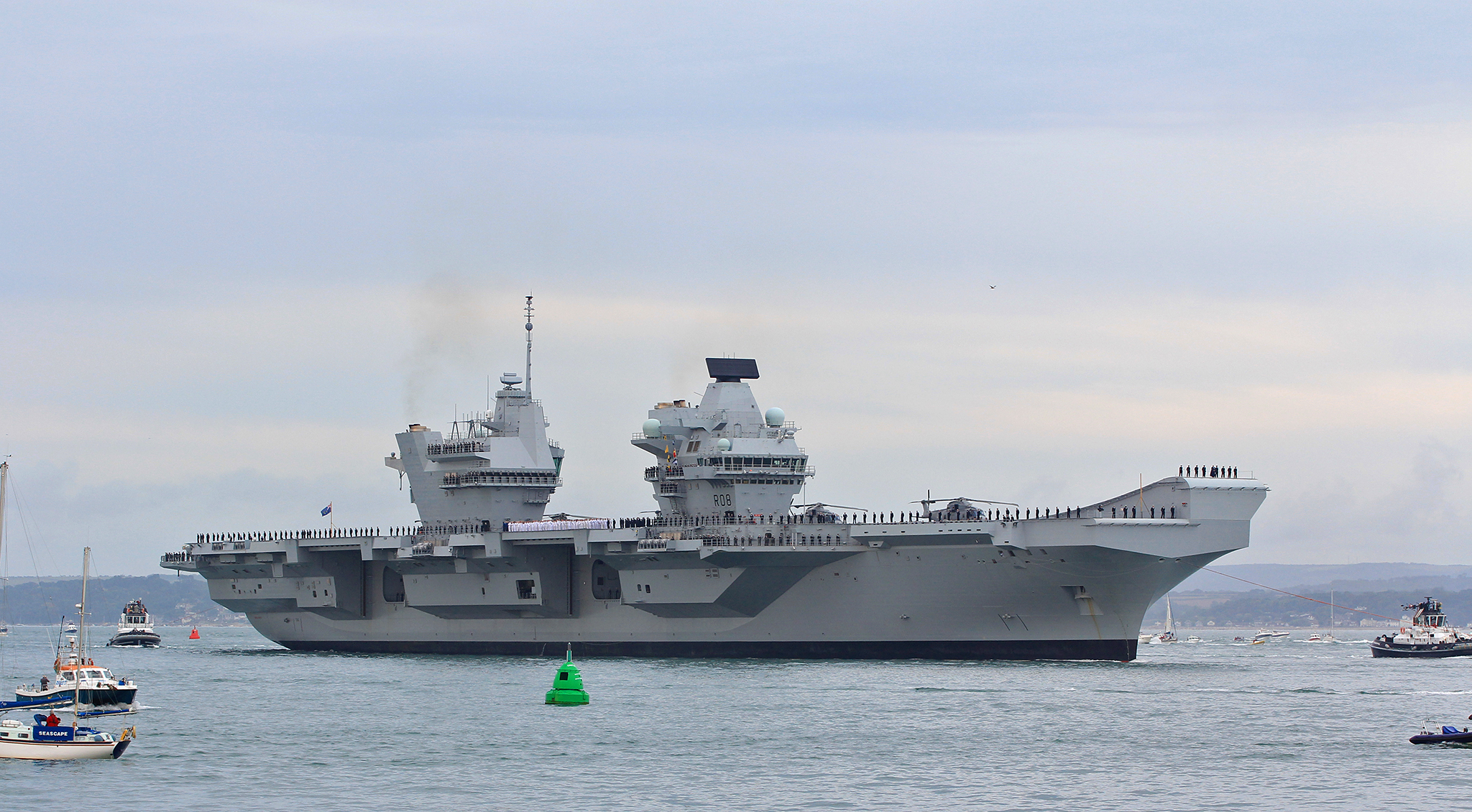
Queen Elizabeth

- Builders: United Kingdom (Aircraft Carrier Alliance)
- Displacement: 70,600 tons
- Aircraft: up to 72 aircraft
- Armament: At least 3 × Phalanx CIWS; 30-mm DS30M Mk 2 guns; Miniguns
- Powerplant: 2 × Rolls-Royce Marine Trent MT30 36 MW (48,000 hp) gas turbine engine;4 × Wärtsilä 38 marine diesel engines (4 × 16V38 11.6 MW or 15,600 hp)
- Speed: 26 knots
- Ships in class: 2
- Operator: Royal Navy
- Commissioned: 7 December 2017
- Status: 2 in service
