= M621 =

M621 can refer to:

- M621 motorway, a road in England
- M621 cannon, a 20 mm cannon
