= T.991-class patrol boat =

Thai-built and designed class of patrol boats

Class overview
- Builders: Marson Shipbuilding; Mahidol Adulyadej Naval Dockyard
- Operators: Royal Thai Navy
- Planned: 3
- Completed: 3

General characteristics
- Type: Patrol boat
- Displacement: 170 tons, 186 tons (full load) (est)
- Length: 38.7m (est)
- Beam: 6.49m (est)
- Draught: 3.8m (est)
- Propulsion: 2 x MTU 16V 4000 R41 R, 2 x diesel generators 140 kW
- Speed: Maximum: 27 knots
- Range: At cruising speed knots: 1,500Nm
- Complement: 29
- Sensors & processing systems: Combat System: Navigation: S G Brown Mk 31 Attitude and Heading Reference Systems (AHRS); Fire Control: Thales MIRADOR
- Armament: 2 × MSI-DSL 30mm DS-30M; , 2 x 12.7mm

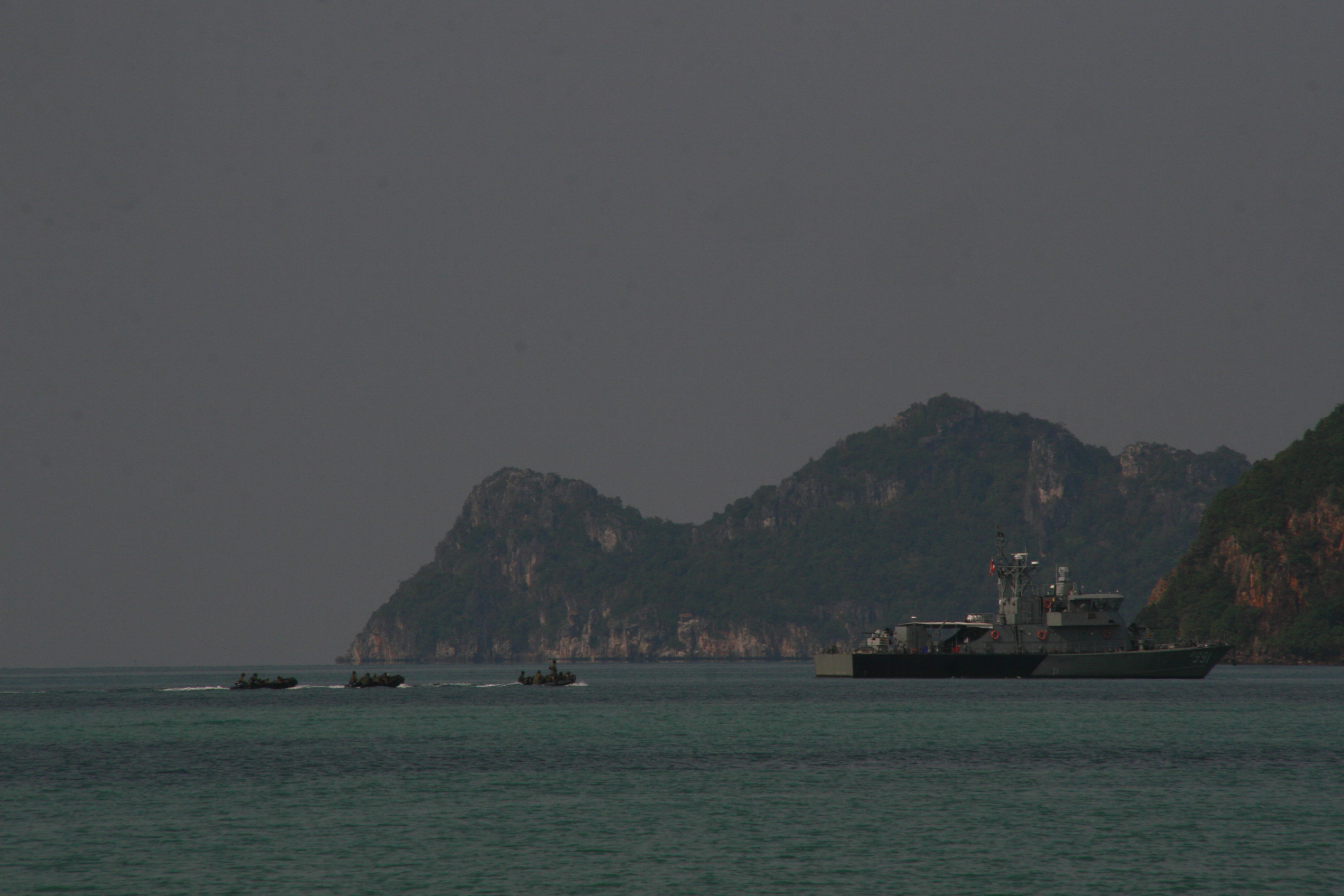
Thai Navy Patrol Boat Number 991 off the coast of Ko Phangan, Thailand.

The Tor 991 is a class of patrol boats designed and built in Thailand. The design of the patrol boat was initiated by King Bhumibol in 2003. The first vessel, T.991 was launched on April 30, 2007.
