= Syarif Masahor =

19th century Malay rebel

Syarif Masahor bin Syarif Hassan (1800, Bruneian Empire - February 1890, Colony of Singapore), also written as Sharif Masahor, was a Malay rebel of Hadhrami descent in Sarikei in the then Bruneian empire.

== Background ==
Before the arrival of James Brooke, Syarif Masahor was the chief of Sarikei that governed the Rajang basin. Syarif also had links with the Iban people from Saribas and Skrang. Syarif also claimed that he is the descendent from the Islamic prophet Muhammad. Syarif was annoyed by James Brooke who intruded Syarif's territory. Together with Datu Patinggi Abdul Gapur from Kuching, he opposed the Brooke rule over Sarawak. Others that who opposed the Brooke's rule are: Pangeran Ersat and his son Pangeran Nipa.

Pangeran Matusin, on the other hand, was a supporter of the Brooke's rule. Matusin was appointed by the Brooke government as Native Officer of Mukah. In 1854, Pangeran Matusin was provoked by followers of Pangeran Ersat. Pangeran Matusin, angered by the provocation, raided the home of Pangeran Mersat and killed both Mersat and his daughter. In 1855, Syarif led his followers and raided Mukah in retaliation. Syarif tried to pursue Matusin and killed several of the Matusin's followers. Pangeran Matusin escaped. However, Matusin later was sacked by the Brooke government due to charges of corruption.

In June 1859, two Melanau chiefs Sawing and Sakalai, rebelled against the Brooke government and killed two Brooke followers named Charles Fox and Henry Steele at Kanowit Fort. Charles Brooke, the Rajah of Sarawak at that time, suspected that Syarif Masahor was the mastermind behind this rebellion. Charles Brooke also suspected that Syarif himself had killed several of those involved in the murder of Charles Fox and Henry Steele to get rid of witnesses of the incident, to pave the way for the bigger plan of eliminating of white people from Sarawak or Syarif was simply disappointed that his followers performed the impulsive killings, thus exposing his plan prematurely.

== Resistance ==
James Brooke's expansion policy caused disturbance in many parts of Borneo. In the initial agreement between James Brooke and the Sultan of Brunei, Sarawak was only a territory which stretched from Tanjung Datu to Maong River (Sungai Maong). Syarif's territory was far away from the designated area. Brooke's encroachment into local leaders' territory caused many locals to rebel, including Syarif Masahor.

James Brooke departed for England at the end of 1857, leaving his nephew, Captain John Brooke Brooke, in charge. This allowed Masahor to put his plans into action. In July 1859, Masahor and his army attacked Brooke's outpost near Bukit Rejang in Kanowit. During this attack, officers Charles Fox and Henry Steele were killed by Melanau people led by Sawing and Sakalai. This frightened the Brooke government following the rebellion by the Bau Chinese in 1857, and the massacre of Europeans in SE Borneo in May 1859, at the start of the Banjarmasin War.

In 1860, Pangeran Matusin accused Syarif of plotting to attack Kuching. Charles Brooke, the Tuan Muda (heir-apparent) of the Brooke government at time worried that Syarif pose a real threat to topple the Brooke government. Charles detained Syarif's perahus (small boats that used oar as paddle) neat Santubong at the mouth of the Sarawak River, when Syarif was on his way to Kuching to deliver revenues. Charles Brooke later tried to attack Mukah, a stronghold of Syarif, but Syarif managed to escape. Syarif went to Brunei with several of his followers and told the acting British Consul General George Edwardes (who was also a former British army officer and the former governor of Labuan) that Charles invasion of Mukah was unjustified. George Edwardes then went to Mukah on an armed steamer named Victoria and ordered Charles to stop the invasion. Charles Brooke decided to retreat on advice of George Edwardes. Edwardes decision to stop Charles Brooke was partly due to his dislike of the Brooke government.

In early 1860, Masahor ordered Temenggung Hayim Jalil from Brunei to go to Pontianak for a meeting with Abdul Gapur. In early February 1860 they mounted an assault on Kuching (at that time, Sarawak), according to Masahor's plan. Masahor and his army wanted to approach Kuching via the Sarawak River. In the battle that ensued, the Sarawak forces gained the upper hand when Charles Brooke succeeded in ambushing and destroying all Masahor's ships. Facing defeat, Masahor retreated to Brunei, where he would seek shelter from the Sarawak government.

The Brooke government later wrote a petition to Britain to remove Edwardes from his post as British Consul in Brunei. The Brooke government's petition was supported by the British and Singapore Chamber of Commerce Sarawak Merchants. Edwardes was successfully removed from his post and Spenser St John was ordered to replace Edwardes.

On 1 July 1861, Spenser St John arrived in Mukah with 300 warboats and a fleet of sailing gunboats. James Brooke took control of Mukah and exiled Syarif to Singapore. Syarif was either willingly went to Singapore because resistance against Brookes were futile or Syarif was tricked by the Brookes to go to Kuching for peace agreement where Syarif was forcibly detained and deported to Singapore. One month after Syarif deported, Mukah, as well as Kidurong in Bintulu was ceded to the Brooke government.

After the incident, Charles Brooke commented Syarif Masahor as "he will never trouble more. I am no lover enough of bloody justice to begrudge him of his life on that condition. He deserved death, but was a murderer for political ends".

James Brooke also went to Brunei, in hopes of forcing the Sultan of Brunei to banish Syarif Masahor to Singapore once and for all.

== Death ==
Syarif Masahor lived the rest of his life in Singapore. The Brooke government granted a small pension for Syarif until his death in February 1890 in Singapore. Syarif was believed to be buried at one of the nearby islands.

== Aftermath ==
Even after the loss of Syarif Masahor, Datu Patinggi Abdul Gapur continued his resistance against the Brooke occupation of Sarawak through Pontianak. But the Dutch quickly captured him, and he was imprisoned in Batavia before being sent to Mecca.

Furthermore, most Malays in what was Sarawak at that time (presently Kuching) did not give support to Syarif Masahor and his resistance fighters because of their loyalty to James Brooke, as Brooke was deemed as a saviour from Brunei's tyranny. However, they in the same time did not give any support to James Brooke, as Syarif Masahor was claimed to be of holy lineage, descended from the Islamic prophet Muhammad himself. Malays, Melanaus and Dayaks from areas outside Kuching (largely Kanowit) rallied behind Syarif Masahor.
