= Alexandria Shipyard =

Egyptian shipyard

Coordinates: 31.1724°N 29.8687°E

- Native name: Arabic: ترسانة الاسكندرية
- Type: Government-owned company
- Industry: Shipbuilding, Defence
- Founded: 1962; 64 years ago
- Headquarters: Alexandria, Egypt
- Products: Warships, merchant vessels up to 57000 tdws, tugboats, river barges, flotillas, offshore engineering
- Services: Shipbuilding, ship maintenance, ship repair and conversion for all kinds of vessels up to 85,000 tdws
- Owner: Ministry of Military Production, Marine Industries And Services Organization
- Number of employees: 2800
- Website: www.alexyard.com.eg

Alexandria Shipyard is a shipyard located in the Alexandria Port in the northern coastal city of Alexandria, Egypt.

== History ==
A contract for the construction Alexandria shipyard and the supply of its shop's equipment was signed in 1962 with the government of the Soviet Union. The yard foundation was laid beside the site of Alexandria Port old graving dock. In 1963 the shipyard apprentice training center was opened to train and qualify the shipbuilding and ship repair personnel. In 1964 the shipyard mechanical slipway with carriage lifting capacity of 600 Tons was opened for service. In 1965 a new graving dock built by a German contractor with a capacity of 85,000 dwt went into service. In 1968 the rest of the shipyard area was reclaimed from the sea and the building of two semi submerged inclined berths were completed. Each can be used for building of vessels to 35,000 dwt. In 1969 after the shipyard has been practically completed, construction of large merchant ships started. In 1971 the first dry cargo vessel "ALEXANDRIA CLASS" M/V Alexandria was launched and towed to the yard outfitting quay for fitting out and delivery. Since then the yard has built and delivered 35 vessels of different types and sizes. By 1976, Russian involvement in the shipyard was curtailed.

In 2004 the shipyard ownership was transferred to the Ministry of Defense under the Maritime Industries and Services Organization (MIASO). In 2011, a contract was signed for upgrading of the shipyard main building facilities with China State Shipbuilding Corporation's China Shipbuilding Trading Co., Ltd. and the work was completed in 2015.

In 2014, the Egyptian Ministry of Defense signed an agreement for the construction of four El Fateh-class corvette. The first vessel was built in Lorient site of DCNS (later Naval Group) and delivered to Egypt in September 2017. The remaining three units of the series were built through technology transfer at the Alexandria Shipyard. The last was delivered in 2020.

== See also ==
- Egypt–Russia relations
