= Lumut Naval Shipyard =

Malaysian maritime company

- Company type: State-owned enterprise
- Industry: Shipbuilding; Defence
- Headquarters: Lumut, Malaysia
- Subsidiaries: See below: LUNAS Shiprepair; LUNAS Langkawi; LUNAS Yachts

Lumut Naval Shipyard (LUNAS) is a shipbuilding company owned by Malaysia. This company is located in Lumut, Perak which is one of the Royal Malaysian Navy (RMN) bases and has several other shipyards throughout Malaysia. The main business of LUNAS is the maintenance and manufacturing of ships as well as the construction of heavy engineering structures and offshore structures.

== History ==
This company began operations in 1984 and was known as the Royal Malaysia Navy Dockyard. The company was later incorporated in 1991 and privatized in 1995 as PSC-Naval Dockyard. In 2005, the management and financial crisis led to it being taken over by Boustead Holdings, which renamed it the Boustead Naval Shipyard (BNS). BNS was then placed under Boustead Holdings subsidiary Boustead Heavy Industries Corporation (BHIC). In 2024, BNS was fully taken over by the Government through the Ministry of Finance's company Ocean Sunshine Sdn Bhd and rebranded as Lumut Naval Shipyard (LUNAS). Within the same year, LUNAS assumed control of Boustead Langkawi Shipyard from BHIC and renamed it LUNAS Langkawi.

== Facilities and capabilities ==
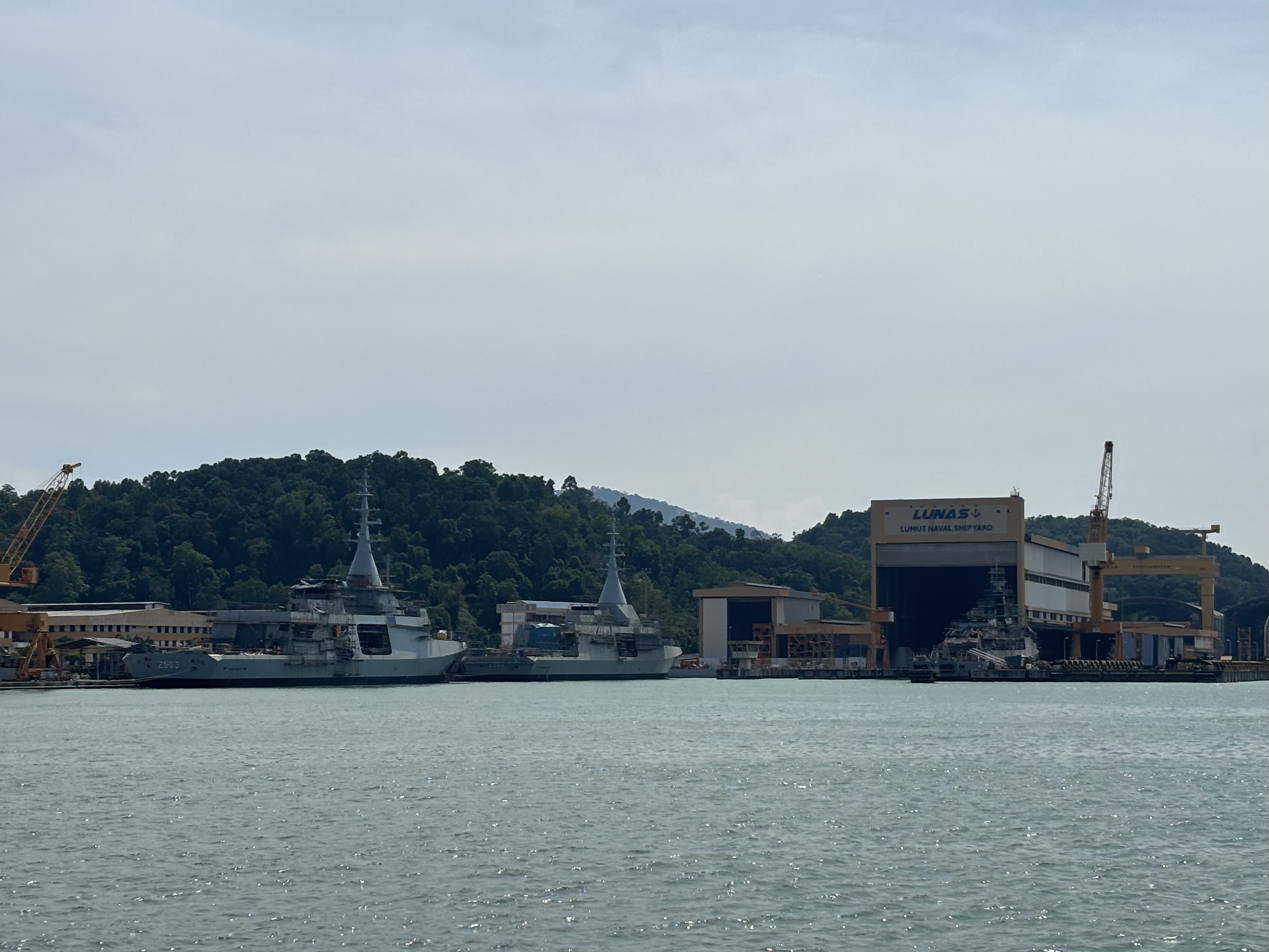
LUNAS shipyard facility viewed from Lumut Naval Base

LUNAS have an area of 120 acres with 400 meters floating jetty with quayside cranage and 950 meters berthing area. The equipment consisted of one 4,500 tonne synchrolift with the length of 120 meters, breadth of 23 meters and 9 meters depth. In addition the company also owned two 300-tonne elevating trucks and one each of 280-tonne safe working load crawler crane, 70-tonne all terrain mobile crane, 50-tonne all terrain mobile crane, 40 tonne quay side slewing crane, 10 tonne quay side slewing crane and 5 tonne quay side slewing crane.

There are also workshop for steel stock yard (2,340 sqm), steel fabrication (19,471 sqm), ship assembly & erection (29,907 sqm), outfitting (8400 sqm), piping & mechanical (9,691 sqm) and electrical work (2,304 sqm). For the hangar facilities, BNS have telescopic hangar (height 29m, area 2,500 sqm), hangar loc 25 (height 34.5m, area 2,500 sqm) and hangar loc 35 (height 9m, area 7,200 sqm) as well as ten 19,000 sqm warehouse and five 31,059 sqm hardstand.
