= M621 cannon =

M621
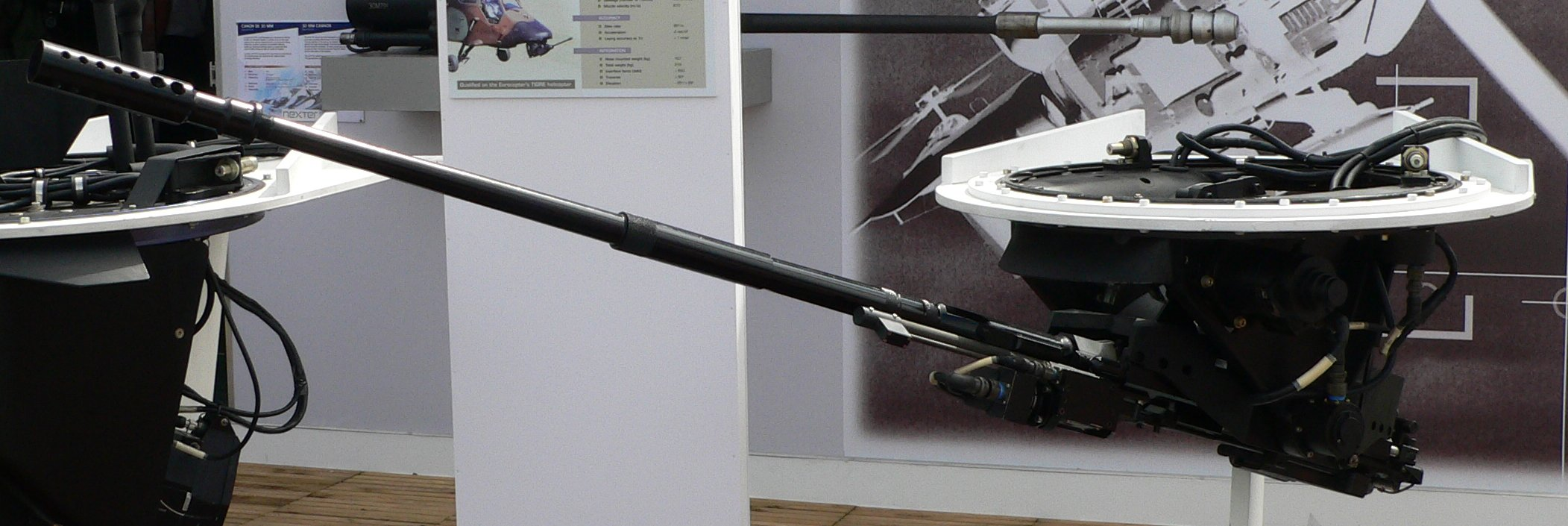
- Type: Automatic cannon
- Place of origin: France

Production history
- Designer: KNDS France
- Manufacturer: KNDS France
- Variants: see variants

Specifications
- Mass: 45.5 kg (100.31 lb)
- Length: 2,207 mm (86.9 in)
- Barrel length: 1,460 mm (57 in)
- Width: 202 mm (8.0 in) (in mount)
- Height: 245 mm (9.6 in) (in mount)
- Cartridge: 20×102mm
- Caliber: 20mm
- Action: Gas operated, delayed blowback
- Rate of fire: 800 rounds/min
- Muzzle velocity: 1,005 m/s (3,297 ft/s) (AP-T); 985 m/s (3,231.6 ft/s) (HEI and TP)
- Feed system: Open-link M12 belt

The M621 is a 20 mm automatic cannon of French design, developed by KNDS France as on-board armament for armored vehicles, aircraft, helicopters and small coastal vessels of the French Navy. It fires the same 20×102mm ammunition as the M61 Vulcan.

== Variants ==
=== THL 20 ===
Turreted cannon for helicopters.

=== POD NC 621 ===
Cannon pod for helicopters and light aircraft.

=== ARX 20 ===
Remotely controlled weapon station with M621 and a 7.62×51mm machinegun.

=== SH20 ===
Door mounted cannon for helicopters.

=== CP 20 ===
Pintle-mounted cannon for vehicles and boats.

=== 15A ===
Cannon for naval ships.

=== NARWHAL ===
As remote-controlled naval gun on the Nexter Narwhal 20A.

== See also ==
- GIAT 30
- 20 mm modèle F2 gun
- M197 electric cannon
