= 30mm DS30M Mark 2 Automated Small Calibre Gun =

DS30M
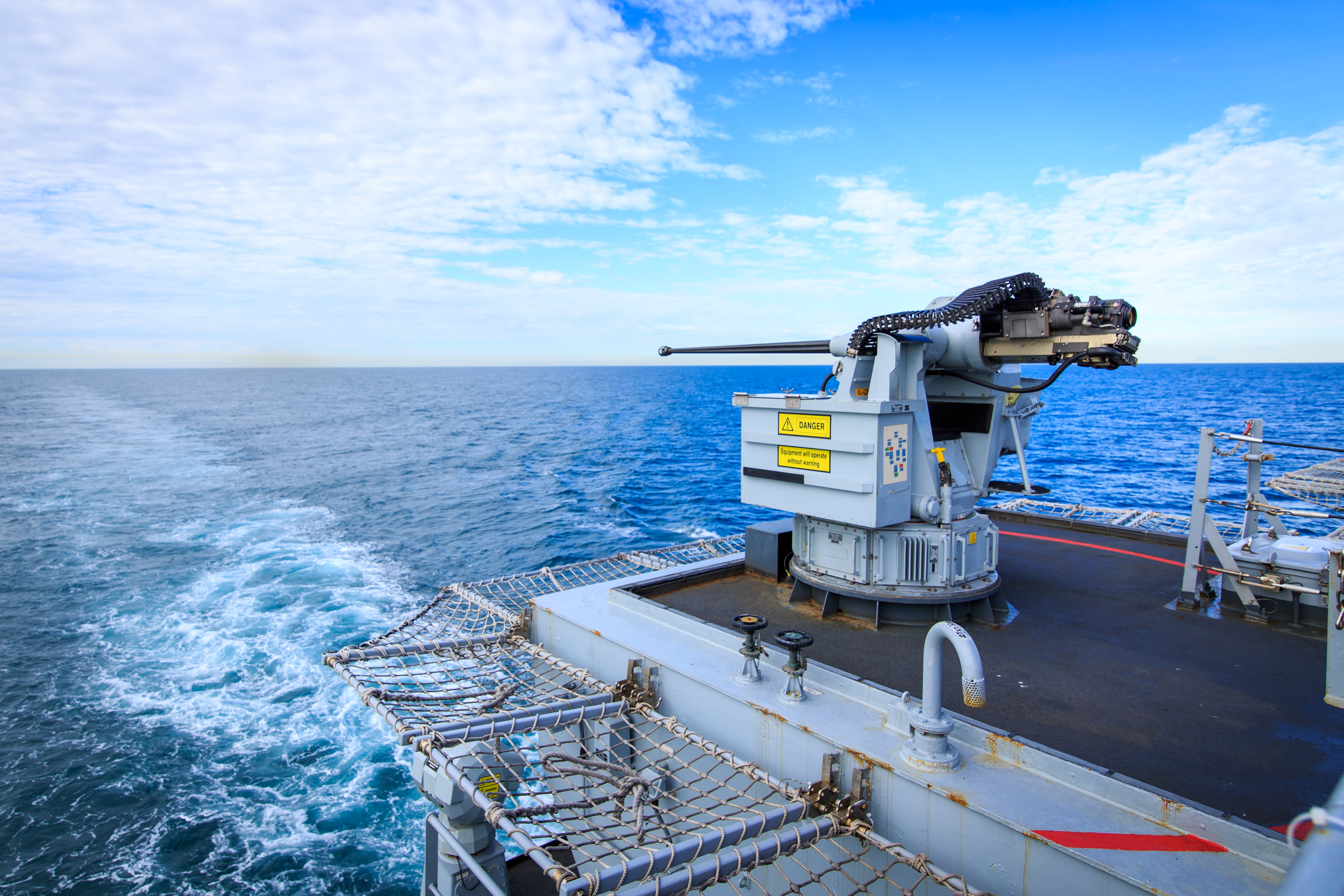
- 30mm DS30M Mark 2 fitted on NAM Atlântico
- Type: Gun turret for autocannon with automated mount or manual control
- Place of origin: United Kingdom

Service history
- In service: 2007–present
- Used by: See operators

Production history
- Designer: MSI-Defence Systems /Alliant Techsystems

Specifications
- Barrel length: 94.88 inches (2,410 mm)
- Shell: 30×173mm
- Caliber: 30 millimetres (1.18 in) caliber
- Muzzle velocity: 1,080 metres per second (3,500 ft/s) (HEI-T ammunition)
- Effective firing range: 5,100 metres (16,700 ft)

The 30mm DS30M Mark 2 is a ship-protection system made by MSI-Defence Systems consisting of a 30mm Mark 44 Bushmaster II cannon on an automated mount. It was designed to defend Royal Navy frigates from fast inshore attack craft armed with short-range missiles, rocket-propelled grenades, machine guns, or explosives.

== Description ==
The DS30M Mark 2 system consists of a 30mm Mark 44 Bushmaster II on a fully automated mount or via manual control with an off-mount electro-optical director (EOD). The gun and the EOD can be controlled from a remote operator console elsewhere on the ship. The weapon is a gyro-stabilized, electrically operated, self-contained, single cannon mount featuring a choice of weapon, control mode and sights. It has low magnetic, radar and infrared signatures with good availability, reliability and maintainability (ARM). In theory, the dual feed system of the Bushmaster series allows the operator to select different types of ammunition for use against a variety of targets.

== History ==
In August 2005, the Maritime Gunnery and Missile Systems Integrated Project Team in the UK Ministry of Defence awarded MSI-Defence Systems (part of MS International PLC) a contract to supply a total of 26 Automated Small Calibre Guns (ASCG) systems for retrofit to the 13 Type 23 frigates of the Royal Navy (RN) as part of their littoral Defensive Anti-Surface Warfare upgrade in a contract was worth more than £15 million (US$30.7 million). The system was bought after Fleet Command and the UK Ministry of Defence's (MoD's) Directorate Equipment Capability identified a gap in capability in the RN's ability to defend itself against swarming fast attack craft threats.

MSI undertook land-based trials at Eskmeals Firing Range in Cumbria. In mid-2007, MSI delivered the first two mountings, which were installed on HMS Somerset in August 2007, and used in sea trials on gun ranges in the English Channel starting in October 2007.

In 2008, the management consultancy company CORDA (part of BAE Systems) was awarded a £300,000 research contract by the UK MoD's Defence Technology and Innovation Centre to assess the level of protection British warships receive from small calibre 30mm guns. CORDA's programme manager said: "What we are doing is looking at the performance of the Royal Navy's 30mm Automated Small Calibre Gun and what can be done to increase the level of protection it provides. [...] The ASCG system has significantly enhanced capability, but we have been asked to look at how improving tactics or integrating further technology could improve the performance of the system." The study used simulator-based operator trials at the Maritime Warfare School to quantify the performance of the weapon system when engaging multiple targets.

In 2019, a trial was carried out on board HMS Sutherland to test the fitting and operation of Martlet light surface-to-surface missiles on a modified DS30M Mark 2 mount. While initial reports suggested that the tests were deemed successful, subsequent reports indicated otherwise. As a result, Martlet has not been integrated into Royal Navy DS30M Mk 2 mounts in the surface-to-surface mode.

== Operators ==
United Kingdom

- The system is fitted to the Royal Navy's Type 23 frigates and River-class Batch II offshore patrol vessels.

Iraq

- The system is fitted to fifteen Swiftships patrol boats of the Iraqi Navy.

Oman

- The system is fitted to three Khareef-class corvettes for the Royal Navy of Oman.

Thailand

- The system is fitted to HTMS Bhumibol Adulyadej and Naresuan-class frigates, HTMS Angthong amphibious assault ship, HTMS Krabi, Laemsing and Tor-class patrol boats, HTMS Prachuap Khiri Khan and khamronsin class corvette.

Malaysia

- Planned to be used by Royal Malaysian Navy on six Maharaja Lela-class frigates.

Brazil

- Used by Brazilian Navy. The system equips the three Amazonas-class offshore patrol vessels and the NAM Atlântico.

== See also ==
- DS30B rapid fire cannon
- Active Royal Navy weapon systems
