= Moroccan frigate Allal Ben Abdellah =

SIGMA 9813 frigate of the Royal Moroccan Navy

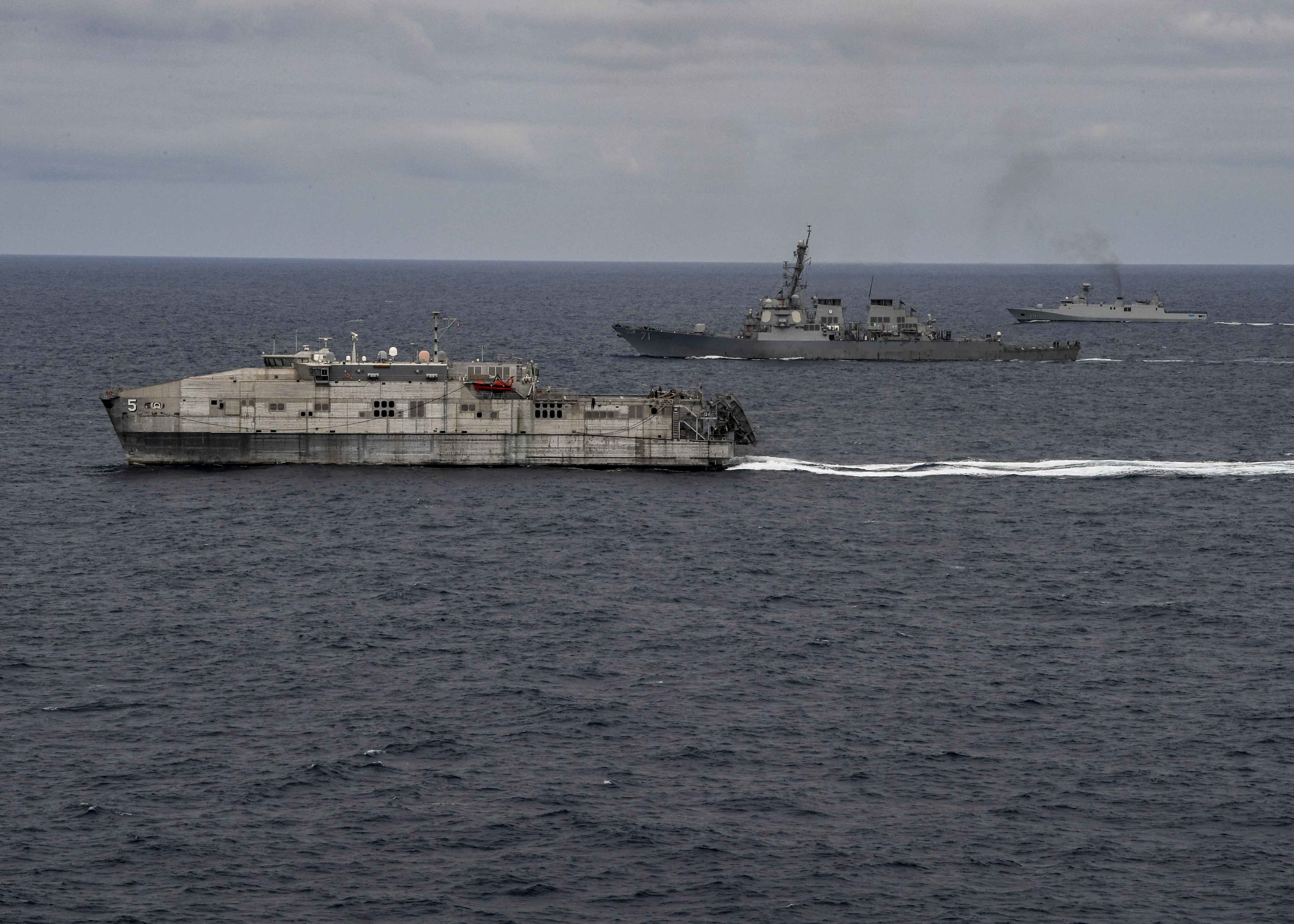
- Allal Ben Abdellah (background) sails in formation with USNS Trenton (foreground) and USS Ross (center) during African Lion 2021 exercise, 11 August 2021

History

Morocco
- Name: Allal Ben Abdellah; (علال بن عبد الله)
- Namesake: Allal ben Abdallah
- Ordered: 6 February 2008
- Builder: Damen Schelde Naval Shipbuilding, Vlissingen
- Laid down: September 2009
- Launched: October 2011
- Commissioned: 8 September 2012
- Identification: Pennant number: 615
- Status: In active service

General characteristics
- Type: SIGMA 9813 frigate
- Displacement: 1,950 tonnes (1,920 long tons)
- Length: 97.91 m (321.2 ft)
- Beam: 13.02 m (42.7 ft)
- Draft: 3.6 m (12 ft)
- Propulsion: 2 × SEMT Pielstick 20PA6B STC diesel engines, 8,100 kW (10,900 shp); 4 × generators, 435 kVA 60 Hz; 1 × backup generator, 150 kVA 60 Hz; 2 × shafts
- Speed: 27.5 knots (50.9 km/h)
- Range: 4,000 NM (7,400 km) at 18 knots (33 km/h)
- Endurance: 20 days
- Boats & landing craft carried: 2 × RHIB
- Complement: 91
- Sensors & processing systems: SMART-S Mk2 air/surface surveillance radar; Thales LIROD Mk2 FCS; Thales KINGKLIP UMS 4132 sonar; Thales TACTICOS combat management system; Thales TSB 2520 IFF; 2 × navigation radars
- Electronic warfare & decoys: Thales VIGILE 100 ESM; Thales SCORPION RECM; 2 × TERMA SKWS chaff launchers
- Armament: 1 × OTO Melara 76 mm gun; 2 × 20 mm modèle F2 gun; 4 × Exocet MM40 Block 3 SSM launchers; 12 × MBDA MICA VLS cells; 2 × 3 B515 torpedo tubes for MU90 torpedoes
- Aircraft carried: 1 × helicopter
- Aviation facilities: Flight deck and hangar

Allal Ben Abdellah (615) (Arabic: علال بن عبد الله) is a SIGMA 9813 frigate of the Royal Moroccan Navy. The ship is the last of three SIGMA multi-mission frigates ordered by Morocco from Damen Schelde Naval Shipbuilding, entering service in 2012.

== Design and description ==
Allal Ben Abdellah has a length of 97.91 m (321.2 ft), a beam of 13.02 m (42.7 ft) and draft of 3.6 m (12 ft). The frigate has a displacement of 1,950 tonnes (1,920 long tons) and is powered by combined diesel or electric (CODOE) type propulsion, consisted of two 8,100 kW (10,900 shp) SEMT Pielstick 20PA6B STC diesel engines, four 435 kVA/60 Hz generators, and one 150 kVA/60 Hz emergency generator connected to two screws. She has a top speed of 27.5 knots (50.9 km/h), range of 4,000 NM (7,400 km) with cruising speed of 18 knots (33 km/h), and endurance up to 20 days. The ship has a complement of 91 personnel.

The ship is armed with one OTO Melara 76 mm/62 gun and two 20 mm modèle F2 guns. For surface warfare, Allal Ben Abdellah are equipped with four Exocet MM40 Block 3 anti-ship missile launchers and twelve vertical launching system cells for MBDA MICA anti-aircraft missiles. For anti-submarine warfare, she is equipped with two three-tube B515 torpedo tubes for MU90 Impact torpedo.

Her sensors and electronic systems consisted of Thales SMART-S Mk2 air/surface surveillance radar, Thales LIROD Mk2 radar/electro-optical fire-control system, Thales KINGKLIP UMS 4132 sonar, Thales TACTICOS combat management system, Thales TSB 2520 IFF, two navigation radars, Thales VIGILE 100 ESM system, Thales SCORPION radar electronic countermeasure, and two TERMA SKWS chaff launchers.

Allal Ben Abdellah also has a hangar and flight deck for a 9 tonnes helicopter. The ship also has two rigid-hulled inflatable boats.

== Construction and career ==
Royal Moroccan Navy signed a contract with Damen on 6 February 2008 for three SIGMA frigates, also referred to as "Moroccan multi-mission frigates" (French: Frégates Multi-Missions Marocaines / FMMM), with the contract value estimated to be US$1.2 billion. The third frigate, which is a SIGMA 9813 design, was laid down in September 2009 at Damen shipyard in Vlissingen, Netherlands. The ship was launched in October 2011. The ship completed sea trials in June 2012.

Allal Ben Abdellah was transferred to the Royal Moroccan Navy and commissioned on 8 September 2012 in Rotterdam, coinciding with the 35th World Port Days event held in the city. In the next three weeks the ship's crew undergo Sail Safety Training in Den Helder and the North Sea, assisted by Royal Netherlands Navy personnel. At the conclusion of the training course in late September 2012, the frigate started her maiden voyage to Morocco.
