= Moroccan frigate Tarik Ben Ziyad =

SIGMA 10513 frigates of the Royal Moroccan Navy

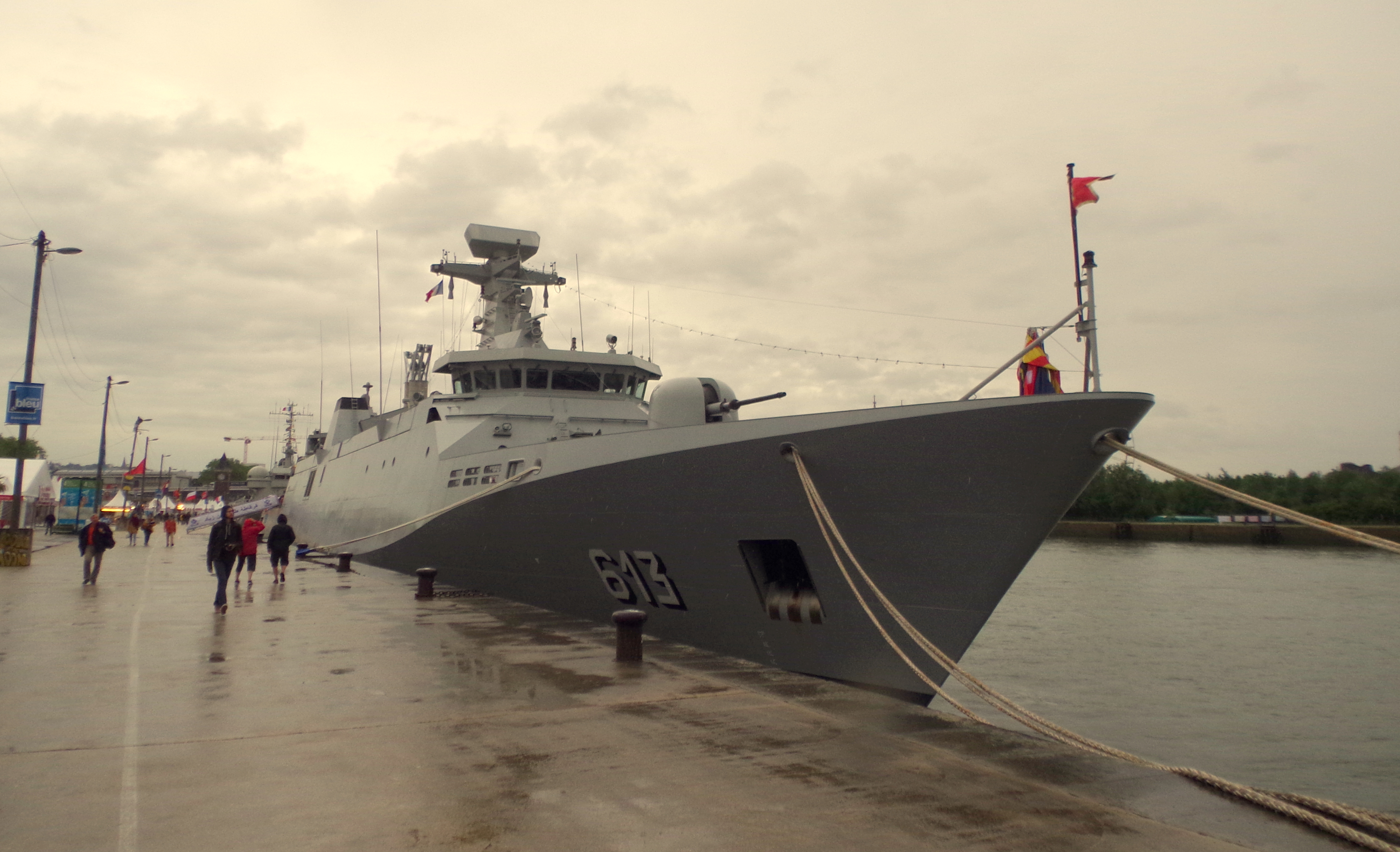
- Tarik Ben Ziyad at Armada Rouen 2019 event

History

Morocco
- Name: Tarik Ben Ziyad; (طارق بن زياد)
- Namesake: Tariq ibn Ziyad
- Ordered: 6 February 2008
- Builder: Damen Schelde Naval Shipbuilding, Vlissingen
- Laid down: April 2008
- Launched: 12 July 2010
- Commissioned: 23 December 2011
- Identification: Pennant number: 613
- Status: In active service

General characteristics
- Type: SIGMA 10513 frigate
- Displacement: 2,185 tonnes (2,150 long tons)
- Length: 105.11 m (344.8 ft)
- Beam: 13.02 m (42.7 ft)
- Draft: 3.6 m (12 ft)
- Propulsion: 2 × SEMT Pielstick 20PA6B STC diesel engines, 8,100 kW (10,900 shp); 4 × generators, 435 kVA 60 Hz; 1 × backup generator, 150 kVA 60 Hz; 2 × shafts
- Speed: 27.5 knots (50.9 km/h)
- Range: 4,000 NM (7,400 km) at 18 knots (33 km/h)
- Endurance: 20 days
- Boats & landing craft carried: 2 × RHIB
- Complement: 110
- Sensors & processing systems: SMART-S Mk2 air/surface surveillance radar; Thales LIROD Mk2 FCS; Thales KINGKLIP UMS 4132 sonar; Thales TACTICOS combat management system; Thales TSB 2520 IFF; 2 × navigation radars
- Electronic warfare & decoys: Thales VIGILE 100 ESM; Thales SCORPION RECM; 2 × TERMA SKWS chaff launchers
- Armament: 1 × OTO Melara 76 mm gun; 2 × 20 mm modèle F2 gun; 4 × Exocet MM40 Block 3 SSM launchers; 12 × MBDA MICA VLS cells; 2 × 3 B515 torpedo tubes for MU90 torpedoes
- Aircraft carried: 1 × helicopter
- Aviation facilities: Flight deck and hangar

Tarik Ben Ziyad (613) (Arabic: طارق بن زياد) is a SIGMA 10513 frigate of the Royal Moroccan Navy. The ship is the first of three SIGMA multi-mission frigates ordered by Morocco from Damen Schelde Naval Shipbuilding, entering service in 2011.

== Design and description ==
Tarik Ben Ziyad has a length of 105.11 m (344.8 ft), a beam of 13.02 m (42.7 ft) and draft of 3.6 m (12 ft). The frigate has a displacement of 2,185 tonnes (2,150 long tons) and is powered by combined diesel or electric (CODOE) type propulsion, consisted of two 8,100 kW (10,900 shp) SEMT Pielstick 20PA6B STC diesel engines, four 435 kVA/60 Hz generators, and one 150 kVA/60 Hz emergency generator connected to two screws. She has a top speed of 27.5 knots (50.9 km/h), range of 4,000 NM (7,400 km) with cruising speed of 18 knots (33 km/h), and endurance up to 20 days. The ship has a complement of 110 personnel, including 26 commissioned officers.

The ship is armed with one OTO Melara 76 mm/62 gun and two 20 mm modèle F2 guns. For surface warfare, Tarik Ben Ziyad are equipped with four Exocet MM40 Block 3 anti-ship missile launchers and twelve vertical launching system cells for MBDA MICA anti-aircraft missiles. For anti-submarine warfare, she is equipped with two three-tube B515 torpedo tubes for MU90 Impact torpedo.

Her sensors and electronic systems consisted of Thales SMART-S Mk2 air/surface surveillance radar, Thales LIROD Mk2 radar/electro-optical fire-control system, Thales KINGKLIP UMS 4132 sonar, Thales TACTICOS combat management system, Thales TSB 2520 IFF, two navigation radars, Thales VIGILE 100 ESM system, Thales SCORPION radar electronic countermeasure, and two TERMA SKWS chaff launchers.

Tarik Ben Ziyad also has a hangar and flight deck for a 9 tonnes helicopter. The ship also has two rigid-hulled inflatable boats.

== Construction and career ==
The Royal Moroccan Navy signed a contract with Damen on 6 February 2008 for three SIGMA frigates, also referred to as "Moroccan multi-mission frigates" (French: Frégates Multi-Missions Marocaines / FMMM), with the contract value estimated to be US$1.2 billion. The first frigate, which is a SIGMA 10513 design, was laid down in April 2008 at Damen's Vlissingen-East shipyard in Vlissingen, Netherlands. The ship was launched on 12 July 2010, then she was towed to Damen's Vlissingen-City shipyard for fitting out. She left Vlissingen for her first sea acceptance trial in the North Sea on 6 May 2011.

Tarik Ben Ziyad was transferred to the Royal Moroccan Navy on 12 September 2011. In the next three weeks the ship's crew were trained in Den Helder and the North Sea, assisted by Royal Netherlands Navy personnel. At the conclusion of the training course in late September 2011, the frigate started her maiden voyage to Morocco. Tarik Ben Ziyad was officially commissioned on 23 December 2011 in Casablanca by the King Mohammed VI of Morocco.

The frigate underwent her first routine dry-docking on 24 October 2014 at Damen ship repair facility in Brest, France. The maintenance took approximately a month.
