= Moroccan frigate Sultan Moulay Ismail =

SIGMA 9813 frigate of the Royal Moroccan Navy

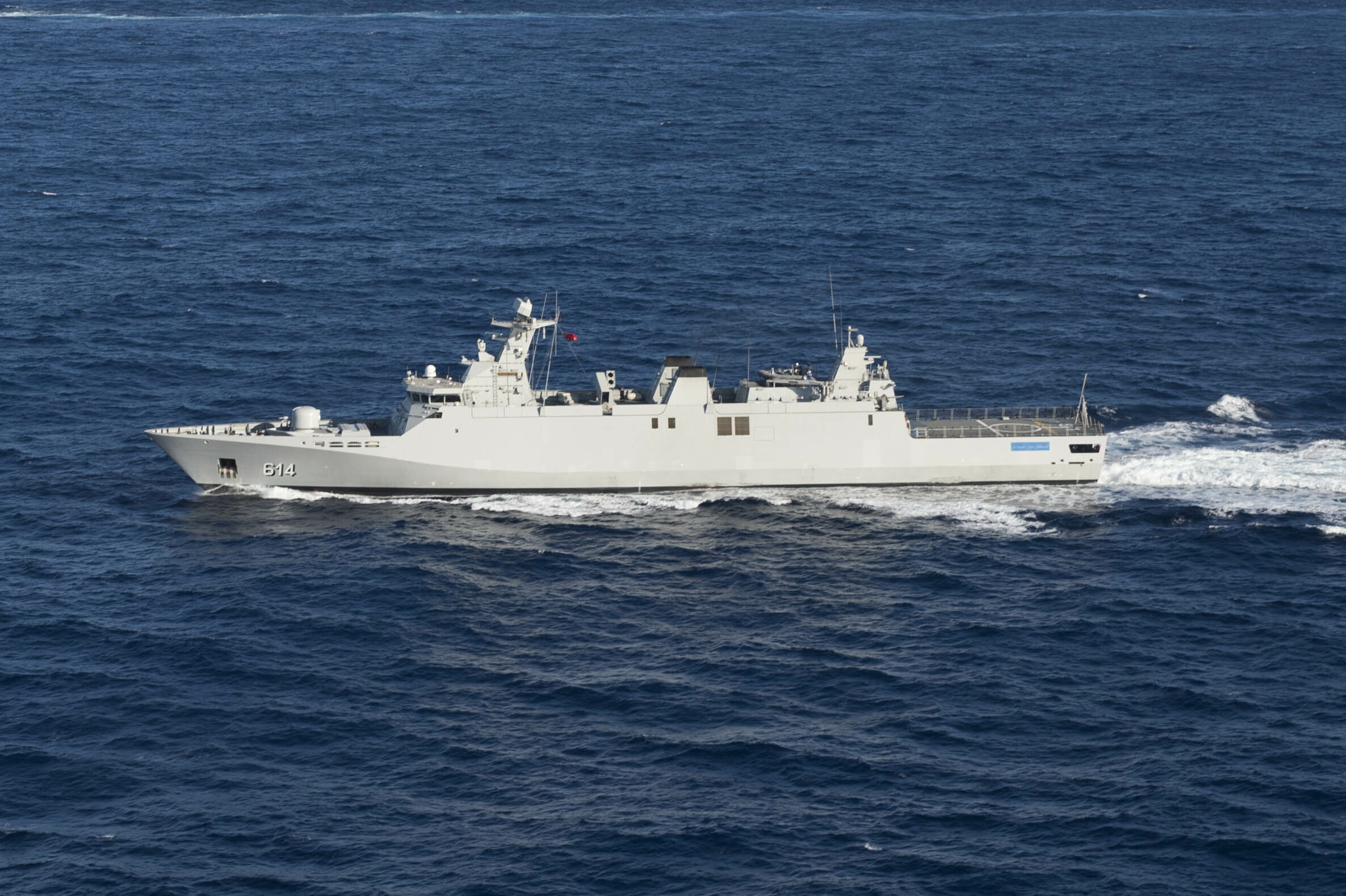
- Sultan Moulay Ismail at sea on 28 November 2015

History

Morocco
- Name: Sultan Moulay Ismail; (السلطان مولاي اسماعيل)
- Namesake: Moulay Ismail Ibn Sharif
- Ordered: 6 February 2008
- Builder: Damen Schelde Naval Shipbuilding, Vlissingen
- Laid down: March 2009
- Launched: 2 February 2011
- Commissioned: 10 March 2012
- Identification: Pennant number: 614
- Status: In active service

General characteristics
- Type: SIGMA 9813 frigate
- Displacement: 1,950 tonnes (1,920 long tons)
- Length: 97.91 m (321.2 ft)
- Beam: 13.02 m (42.7 ft)
- Draft: 3.6 m (12 ft)
- Propulsion: 2 × SEMT Pielstick 20PA6B STC diesel engines, 8,100 kW (10,900 shp); 4 × generators, 435 kVA 60 Hz; 1 × backup generator, 150 kVA 60 Hz; 2 × shafts
- Speed: 27.5 knots (50.9 km/h)
- Range: 4,000 NM (7,400 km) at 18 knots (33 km/h)
- Endurance: 20 days
- Boats & landing craft carried: 2 × RHIB
- Complement: 91
- Sensors & processing systems: SMART-S Mk2 air/surface surveillance radar; Thales LIROD Mk2 FCS; Thales KINGKLIP UMS 4132 sonar; Thales TACTICOS combat management system; Thales TSB 2520 IFF; 2 × navigation radars
- Electronic warfare & decoys: Thales VIGILE 100 ESM; Thales SCORPION RECM; 2 × TERMA SKWS chaff launchers
- Armament: 1 × OTO Melara 76 mm gun; 2 × 20 mm modèle F2 gun; 4 × Exocet MM40 Block 3 SSM launchers; 12 × MBDA MICA VLS cells; 2 × 3 B515 torpedo tubes for MU90 torpedoes
- Aircraft carried: 1 × helicopter
- Aviation facilities: Flight deck and hangar

Sultan Moulay Ismail (614) (Arabic: السلطان مولاي اسماعيل) is a SIGMA 9813 frigate of the Royal Moroccan Navy. The ship is the second of three SIGMA multi-mission frigates ordered by Morocco from Damen Schelde Naval Shipbuilding, entering service in 2012.

== Design and description ==
Sultan Moulay Ismail has a length of 97.91 m (321.2 ft), a beam of 13.02 m (42.7 ft) and draft of 3.6 m (12 ft). The frigate has a displacement of 1,950 tonnes (1,920 long tons) and is powered by combined diesel or electric (CODOE) type propulsion, consisting of two 8,100 kW (10,900 shp) SEMT Pielstick 20PA6B STC diesel engines, four 435 kVA/60 Hz generators, and one 150 kVA/60 Hz emergency generator connected to two screws. She has a top speed of 27.5 knots (50.9 km/h), a range of 4,000 NM (7,400 km) with cruising speed of 18 knots (33 km/h), and endurance up to 20 days. The ship has a complement of 91 personnel.

The ship is armed with one OTO Melara 76 mm/62 gun and two 20 mm modèle F2 guns. For surface warfare, Sultan Moulay Ismail is equipped with four Exocet MM40 Block 3 anti-ship missile launchers and twelve vertical launching system cells for MBDA MICA anti-aircraft missiles. For anti-submarine warfare, she is equipped with two three-tube B515 torpedo tubes for MU90 Impact torpedo.

Her sensors and electronic systems consisted of Thales SMART-S Mk2 air/surface surveillance radar, Thales LIROD Mk2 radar/electro-optical fire-control system, Thales KINGKLIP UMS 4132 sonar, Thales TACTICOS combat management system, Thales TSB 2520 IFF, two navigation radars, Thales VIGILE 100 ESM system, Thales SCORPION radar electronic countermeasure, and two TERMA SKWS chaff launchers.

Sultan Moulay Ismail also has a hangar and flight deck for a 9-tonne helicopter. The ship also has two rigid-hulled inflatable boats.

== Construction and career ==
Royal Moroccan Navy signed a contract with Damen on 6 February 2008 for three SIGMA frigates, also referred to as "Moroccan multi-mission frigates" (French: Frégates Multi-Missions Marocaines / FMMM), with the contract value estimated to be US$1.2 billion. The second frigate, which is a SIGMA 9813 design, was laid down in March 2009 at Damen's Vlissingen-East shipyard in Vlissingen, Netherlands. The ship was launched on 2 February 2011, then she was towed to Damen's Vlissingen-City shipyard for fitting out. The ship completed sea acceptance trials in December 2011.

Sultan Moulay Ismail was transferred to the Royal Moroccan Navy and commissioned on 10 March 2012. In the next three weeks the ship's crew underwent Sail Safety Training in Den Helder and the North Sea, assisted by Royal Netherlands Navy personnel. At the conclusion of the training course in April 2012, the frigate started her maiden voyage to Morocco.
