= ARM Benito Juárez (POLA-101) =

Sigma design frigate of the Mexican Navy

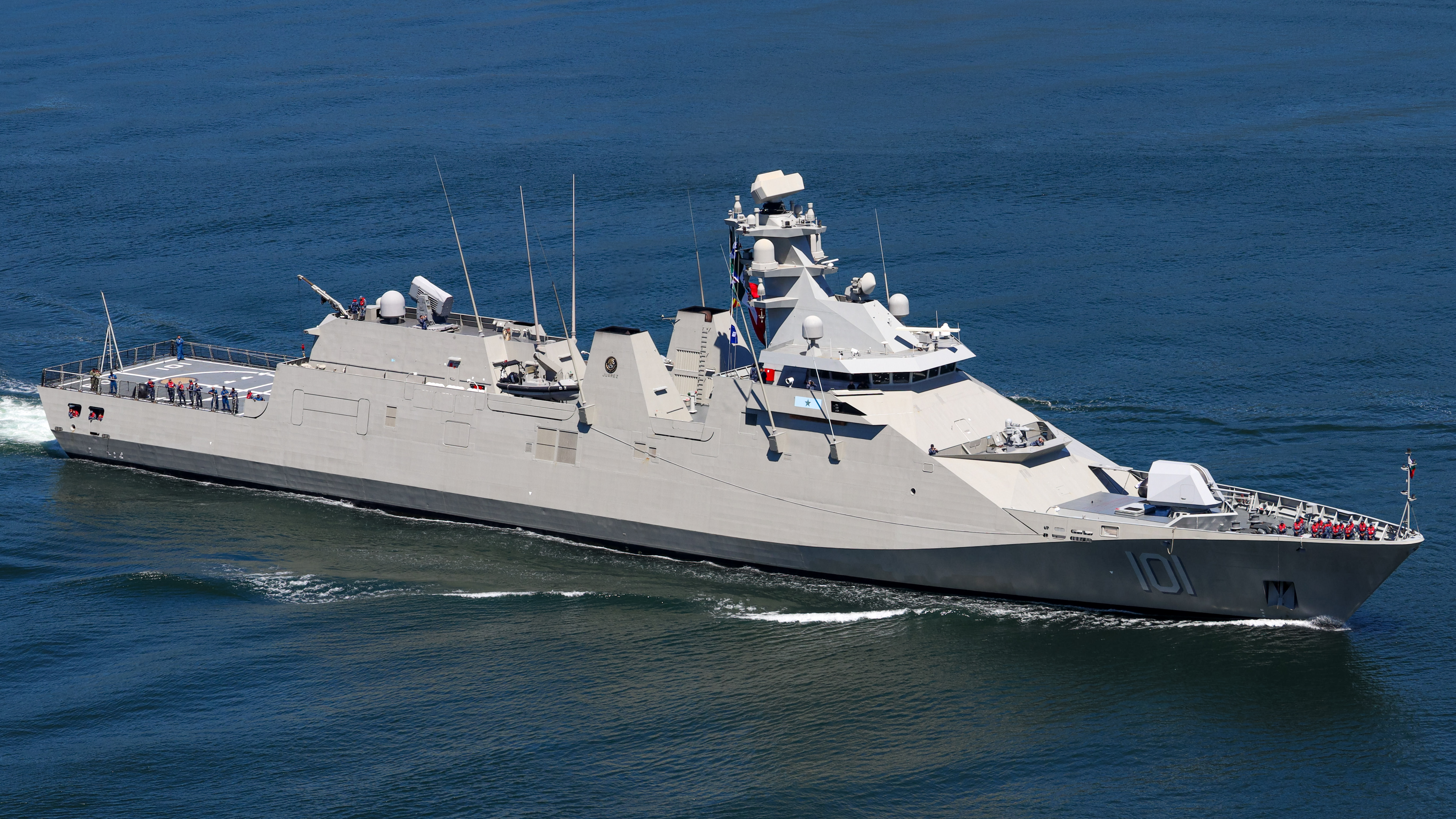
- ARM Benito Juárez in Burrard Inlet on June of 2025

History

Mexico
- Name: Reformador
- Renamed: Benito Juárez
- Namesake: Reformer in Spanish; Benito Juárez
- Builder: Damen Schelde Naval Shipbuilding, Netherlands; Astillero de Marina No. 20, Salina Cruz, Mexico
- Laid down: 17 August 2017
- Launched: 23 November 2018
- Commissioned: 6 February 2020
- Identification: Hull number: POLA-101
- Status: In active service

General characteristics
- Type: Reformador-class frigate; (SIGMA 10514 LROPV)
- Displacement: 2,575 long tons (2,616 t) standard
- Length: 107.50 m (352.7 ft)
- Beam: 14.08 m (46.2 ft)
- Draft: 3.90 m (12.8 ft)
- Propulsion: 2 × diesel engines, 9,240 kW (12,390 shp); 6 × diesel generators, 735 kW (986 shp); 2 × electric motors; 2 × shafts
- Speed: 28 knots (52 km/h)
- Range: 5,000 NM (9,300 km) at 18 knots (33 km/h)
- Endurance: 20 days
- Complement: 122
- Sensors & processing systems: SMART-S Mk2 air/surface surveillance radar; Anschütz Synapsis navigation radar; 1 × Thales Captas-2 towed sonar; Thales TACTICOS combat management system; ERA Indra Rigel ESM
- Armament: 1 × Bofors 57 mm/L70 Mk 3; 2 × 25 mm Rafael Typhoon Mk 38 Mod 2 RCWS; 6 × 12.7 mm (.50 cal) M2 Browning; 1 × RIM-116 RAM SAM launcher; 2 × 3 Mark 32 torpedo tubes; 8 × RIM-162 ESSM vertical launching system cells; 4 × RGM-84L Harpoon Block II
- Aircraft carried: 1 × AS565 Panther helicopter or 1 × MH-60R Seahawk anti-submarine helicopter for more traditional naval combat if needed
- Aviation facilities: Flight deck and hangar

ARM Benito Juárez (POLA-101) is the lead ship of Reformador-class frigate of the Mexican Navy. Previously was named as ARM Reformador until March 2020, the ship is officially classified as "long-range ocean patrol ship" (Spanish: Patrulla Oceánica de Largo Alcance / POLA).

== Design and description ==
Reformador has a length of 107.14 m (351.5 ft), a beam of 14.08 m (46.2 ft) and draft of 3.75 m (12.3 ft). The frigate has standard displacement of 2,575 long tons (2,616 t) and is powered by combined diesel or electric (CODOE) type propulsion, consisted of two 9,240 kW (12,390 shp) diesel engines, six 735 kW (986 shp) diesel generators, and two electric motors connected to two propellers. She has a top speed of 28 knots (52 km/h), range of 5,000 NM (9,300 km) with cruising speed of 18 knots (33 km/h), and endurance up to 20 days. The ship has a complement of 122 personnel.

The ship are armed with one Bofors 57 mm Naval Automatic Gun L/70 Mark 3, two 25 mm Rafael Typhoon Mk 38 Mod 2 remote-controlled weapon stations, and six 12.7 mm (.50 cal) M2 Browning. For surface warfare, Reformador are equipped with four RGM-84L Harpoon Block II anti-ship missile launchers, one RIM-116 Rolling Airframe Missile anti-aircraft missile launcher, and eight RIM-162 ESSM vertical launching system cells. For anti-submarine warfare, she is equipped with two three-tube Mark 32 torpedo tubes for Mark 54 torpedo.

Her sensors and electronic systems consisted of Thales SMART-S Mk2 air/surface surveillance radar, Raytheon Anschütz Synapsis navigation radar, one Thales Captas-2 towed sonar, Thales TACTICOS combat management system and ERA Indra Rigel electronic warfare suite.

Reformador also has a hangar and flight deck for helicopter. She can accommodate a MH-60R Seahawk anti-submarine helicopter, though in practice she usually carries an AS565 Panther helicopter.

== Construction and career ==
The ship was laid down on 17 August 2017 at Damen Schelde Naval Shipbuilding in Vlissingen, the Netherlands. Similar to the Indonesian Martadinata-class frigates built previously, the ship are built from six modules or sections. Two modules were built by Damen Naval in Vlissingen, with another four modules built at Astillero de Marina Número 20 (ASTIMAR 20) in Mexico, which also assembled the modules and finished the ship. The two modules built in the Netherlands were transported to the Mexican shipyard for assembly.

The frigate was launched and officially named as ARM Reformador (POLA-101) on 23 November 2018 in a ceremony at ASTIMAR 20 in Salina Cruz, Oaxaca, coinciding with the Mexican Navy Day. The ceremony was attended by the then-President Enrique Peña Nieto. Reformador was the first large warship to be built in Mexico in more than 80 years.

The ship completed sea trials in December 2019. Reformador was handed over to the Mexican Navy and commissioned on 6 February 2020 in a ceremony at ASTIMAR 20 in Salina Cruz. The frigate was renamed to ARM Benito Juárez in March 2020, ordered by President Andrés Manuel López Obrador.
