= Khareef-class corvette =

Omani navy ship class

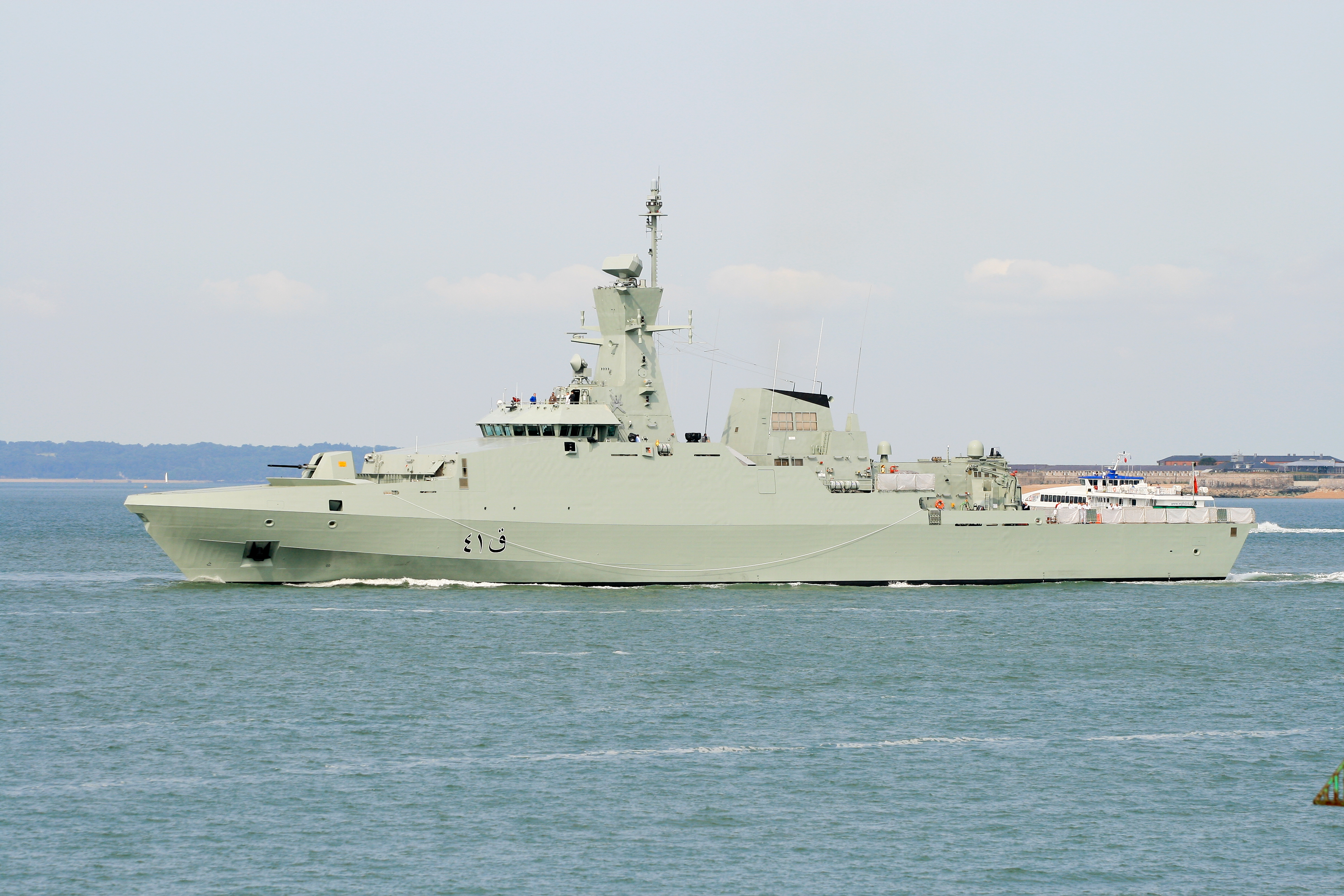
- Al-Rahmani, outbound from Portsmouth Naval Base June 2013.

Class overview
- Name: Khareef class
- Builders: BAE Systems
- Operators: Oman
- Planned: 3
- Completed: 3
- Active: 3

General characteristics
- Type: Corvette
- Displacement: 2,660 tonnes
- Length: 99 m (325 ft)
- Beam: 14.6 m (48 ft)
- Draught: 4.1 m (13 ft)
- Propulsion: Two MTU 4000 series diesel engines
- Speed: 28 kn (52 km/h; 32 mph)
- Range: 4,500 nmi (8,300 km; 5,200 mi)
- Endurance: 21 days
- Complement: 100
- Sensors & processing systems: SMART-S Mk2 3D S-band multibeam radar; TACTICOS combat management system; Thales Nederland Sting electro-optic weapons director
- Armament: 1 × 76 mm OTO Melara gun; 2 × 30mm MSI DS30M cannon; 12 × VL MICA surface-to-air missiles; 8 × MM-40 Block III Exocet surface-to-surface missiles
- Aircraft carried: 1 x medium helicopter
- Aviation facilities: Enclosed hangar

The Khareef class are three corvettes operated by the Royal Navy of Oman. The ships were built by BAE Systems at their shipyard in Portsmouth, as part of a £400m deal it also included training by VT Group.

== Role ==
The three vessels are capable of:

- Protection of maritime areas of interest including EEZ
- Extended surveillance patrols
- Deterrent operations during times of tension
- Fully interoperable with joint and coalition operations
- Special operations
- Search and rescue
- Maritime disaster relief operations

== Ships in class ==
Photo	Ship	Hull number	Launched	Commissioned	Status
	Al-Shamikh	Q40	22 July 2009	(IA 2013)	In active service
	Al-Rahmani	Q41	23 July 2010		In active service
	Al-Rasikh	Q42	27 June 2011		In active service

== Incidents ==
In March 2012 three BAE engineers were injured after a gun misfired during testing off the Dorset coast.
