= Sigma-class design =

Dutch-built family of modular naval vessels, of corvette or frigate size

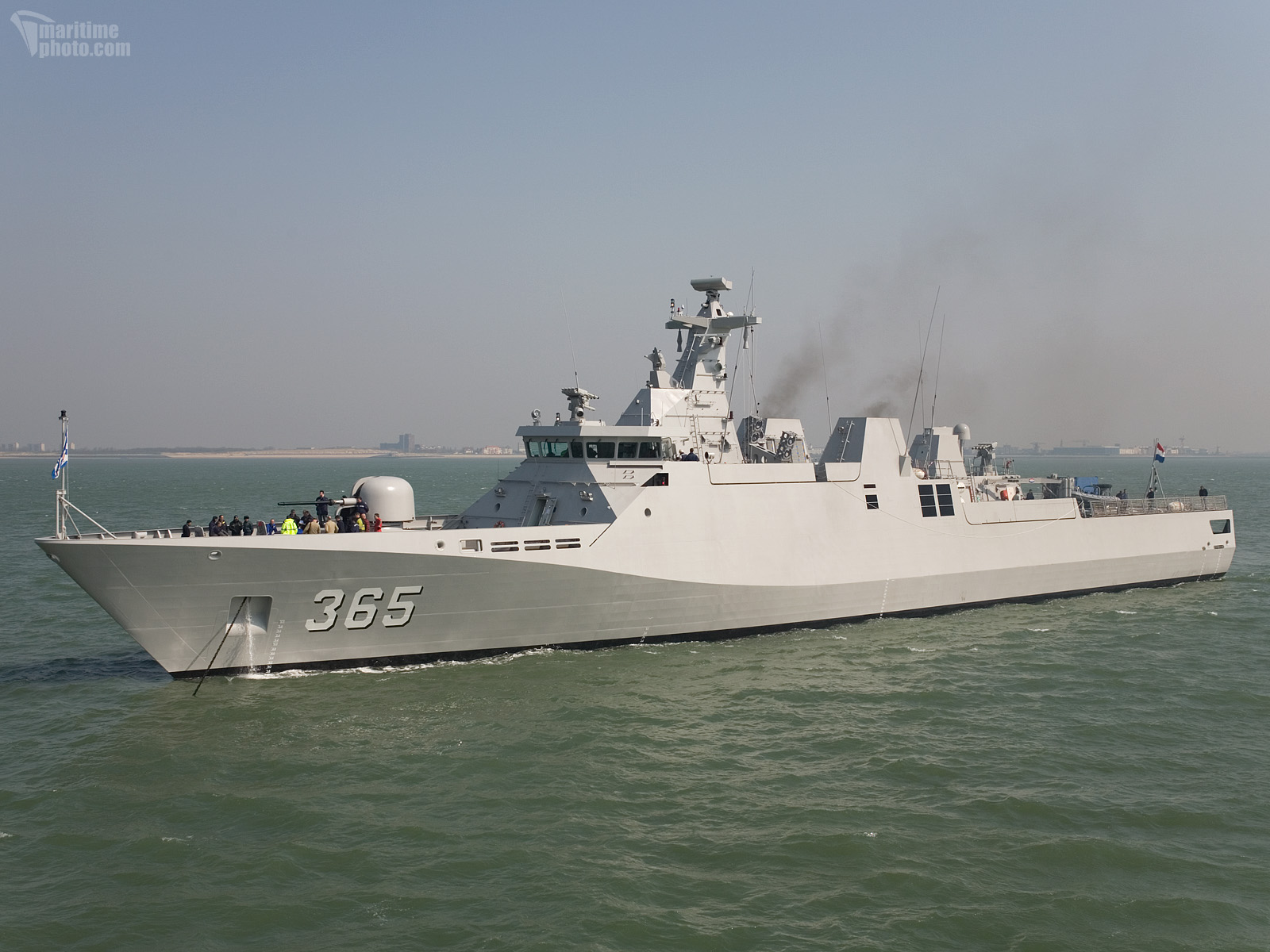
- SIGMA 9113 corvette, KRI Diponegoro (365)

Class overview
- Builders: Damen Schelde Naval Shipbuilding; PT PAL Indonesia; ASTIMAR 20; COTECMAR
- Operators: Indonesian Navy; Royal Moroccan Navy; Mexican Navy
- Subclasses: 9113 (Indonesian corvette variant); 9813 (Moroccan heavy corvette variant); 10513 (Moroccan light frigate variant); 10514 PKR (Indonesian frigate variant); 10514 POLA (Mexican Long Range OPV Variant)
- Cost: $222 million
- Built: 2005–present
- In commission: 2007–present
- Planned: 18
- Completed: 10
- Active: 10

General characteristics (Corvette 9113)
- Type: Multi-purpose corvette / frigate
- Displacement: 1,692 tons
- Length: 90.71 m (297 ft 7 in)
- Beam: 13.02 m (42 ft 9 in)
- Draft: 3.60 m (11 ft 10 in)
- Propulsion: 2 × SEMT Pielstick 20PA6B STC rated at 8910 kW each driving a lightweight Geislinger coupling combination BE 72/20/125N + BF 110/50/2H (steel – composite coupling combination); 4 × Caterpillar 3406C TA generator rated at 350 kW each; 1 × Caterpillar 3304B emergency generator rated at 105 kW; 2 × shaft with Rolls-Royce Kamewa 5 bladed controllable pitch propeller; 2 × Renk ASL94 single step reduction gear with passive roll stabilization
- Speed: Maximum: 28 knots (52 km/h; 32 mph); Cruising: 18 knots (33 km/h; 21 mph); Economy: 14 knots (26 km/h; 16 mph)
- Range: Cruising speed at 18 kn (33 km/h; 21 mph): 3,600 nmi (6,700 km; 4,100 mi); Economy speed at 14 kn (26 km/h; 16 mph): 4,800 nmi (8,900 km; 5,500 mi)
- Complement: 20, up to 80
- Sensors & processing systems: Combat System: Thales Group Tacticos with 4 × Multifunction Operator Console Mk 3 2H; Search radar: MW08 3D multibeam surveillance radar; IFF: Thales TSB 2525 Mk XA (integrated with MW08); Navigation radar: Sperry Marine BridgeMasterE ARPA radar; Fire control radar: Lirod Mk 2 tracking radar; Data Link: LINK Y Mk 2 datalink system; Sonar: Thales UMS 4132 Kingklip medium frequency active/passive ASW hull mounted sonar; Internal Communications: Thales Communication's Fibre Optical COmmunications Network (Focon) or EID's ICCS where on-board users have access to internal and/or external communication channels and integrated remote control of communications equipment; Satellite Comms: Nera F series; Navigation System: Raytheon Anschutz integrated navigation; Integrated Platform Management System: Imtech UniMACs 3000 Integrated Bridge System
- Electronic warfare & decoys: ESM: Thales VIGILE 100; ECM: Racal Scorpion 2L; Decoy: Terma SKWS, DLT-12T 130mm decoy launchers, port, starboard
- Armament: 1 × Oto Melara 76 mm gun (A position); 2 × 20 mm Denel GI-2 gun (B position); 2 × quad (8) Mistral TETRAL Anti-air missile, forward & aft; 4 × Exocet MM40 Block II/MM40 Block III anti-surface missile; 2 × B515/3 triple launchers for lightweight WASS A244-S mod.3/EuroTorp MU 90 torpedoes
- Aviation facilities: Landing pad, optional hangar

The SIGMA class is a Dutch-built family of modular naval vessels, of either corvette or frigate size, designed by Damen Group.

SIGMA stands for Ship Integrated Geometrical Modularity Approach. The basic design of the SIGMA Patrol Series can vary as the hull segments are designed as components. Ships can vary in the number of hull segments and in the order in which they are placed. The ship's dimensions of length and beam lead to the individual SIGMA type names: the SIGMA 9113 is 91 m (298 ft 7 in) long with a beam of 13 m (42 ft 8 in), the SIGMA 10513 is 105 m (344 ft 6 in) in length again with a beam of 13 m (42 ft 8 in)

The design was derived from the earlier High Speed Displacement hull form by Marin Teknikk AS in the 1970s.

== Versions ==
There are three types of Sigma combatants

- Sigma frigate
- Sigma corvette
- Sigma fast attack corvette

Simplified comparisons between the different Sigma models.

Comparisons between the different SIGMA models
	Compact SIGMA 7310	SIGMA 9113	SIGMA 9813	SIGMA 9814	SIGMA 10513	SIGMA PKR 10514	SIGMA 10514 POLA	SIGMA PES 10714CO
User	–	Indonesian Navy	Royal Moroccan Navy	Vietnam People's Navy	Royal Moroccan Navy	Indonesian Navy	Mexican Navy	Colombian National Navy
Type	Fast attack corvette	Corvette	Frigate	Frigate	Frigate	Frigate	Frigate (Long Range Patrol Vessel)	Frigate
Length	74.2 meters	90.01 meters	97.91 meters	99.91 meters	105.11 meters	105.11 meters	107.5 meters	107.5 meters
Beam	10.00 meters	13.02 meters	13.02 meters	14.02 meters	13.02 meters	14.02 meters	14.02 meters	14.02 meters
Draft	3.10 meters	3.60 meters	3.75 meters	3.75 meters	3.75 meters	3.75 meters	3.75 meters	3.93 meters
Displacement	900 tons	1,692 tons	2,075 tons	2,150 tons	2,335 tons	2,946 tons	2,575 tons	2,808 tons
Main machinery	4x 3.900 kW	2 x 8.910 kW	2 x 8.910 kW	tbd	2 x 8.910 kW	2 x 10.000 kW	2 x 13.410 kW	2 x 10.000 kW
Speed (cruising)	18 knots	18 knots	18 knots	tbd	18 knots	18 knots	18 knots	14 knots
Speed (maximum)	34 knots	28 knots	28 knots	tbd	28 knots	28 knots	28 knots	26 knots
Endurance	2,000 nmi	3,600 nmi	4,000 nmi	tbd	4,000 nmi	5,000 nmi	5,000 nmi+	8,200 nmi
Primary sensors	Thales NS-100	Thales MW08 (Thales NS50)	Thales SMART-S MK2	Thales SMART-S MK2	Thales SMART-S MK2	Thales SMART-S MK2	Thales SMART-S MK2	SAAB SEA GIRAFFE 4A
Complement	50	80	91	103	110	122	122	125
Helicopter capabilities	none	deck only	deck and hangar (9 ton)	deck and hangar	deck and hangar (9 ton)	deck and hangar (10 ton)	deck and hangar (10 ton)	deck and hangar (10 ton)
Status	Design concept	Operational	Operational	Cancelled	Operational	Operational	Operational	Under development

There are multiple new SIGMA designs released in early 2015 these are the:

- SIGMA 8313
- SIGMA 8011
- SIGMA 7613
- SIGMA 6610

They are likely to be part of the Compact SIGMA series, a new series small sized combatants with shorter range and up to 2 weeks mission endurance with the same combat systems as the larger version. Besides these smaller designs, there are also larger designs, such as the SIGMA 11515 frigate and the SIGMA 12516 frigate.

During DIMDEX 2024 Damen presented a Batch 2 version of the Sigma 10514 POLA which has a length up to 130 meters, a width between 14 and 17 meters and a draft of 4 meters.

== Operators ==
=== Current operators ===
- Indonesia operates four SIGMA 9113 Diponegoro-class corvette and two SIGMA 10514 Martadinata-class frigates.
- Mexico operate one SIGMA 10514 LROPV, ARM Benito Juárez (F 101).
- Morocco operates two SIGMA 9813 class heavy corvettes (with VLS) and a SIGMA 10513 class light frigate based on a modified design.

=== Potential operators ===
- Greece - Damen Schelde submitted a proposal to the Hellenic Navy for SIGMA 10514HN Corvetes based on the SIGMA 10514. This proposal along with Naval Group's proposal for Gowind 2500 are the candidates for the future Hellenic Navy's corvettes to replace the older Elli-class frigates.
- Malaysia - Although SIGMA-class design not be chosen as Littoral Combat Ship (LCS) program, Damen with Malaysian shipyard, Gading Marine has offered their improved SIGMA 9113 LMS design for RMN Littoral Mission Ship (LMS) second batch during Defence Services Asia 2022 (DSA 2022).
- Peru - The Peruvian Navy plans to acquire between three and six ships, with a displacement of 3,000 to 4,000 tons. During the 6th International Exhibition of Technology in Defense and Prevention of Natural Disasters (Sitdef 2017) Damen Group offered the SIGMA-class design to the Peruvian Navy. It believes that the variety of models of frigates offered by the SIGMA series allows to fit without difficulty to the requirements of the Peruvian Navy.

=== Failed bids ===
- Brazil - Damen and Saab AB joined in a consortium called "Damen-Saab Tamandaré" with a bid to supply the Brazilian Navy with four new Tamandaré-class frigates. On 28 March 2019, Damen lost the competition to a consortium led by TKMS and Embraer with a project derived of the MEKO A-100-class corvettes.
- Egypt - Damen Schelde was in competition for four SIGMA corvettes (+ two options) for the Egyptian Navy. The French Gowind-class corvette won this bid. The other competitor was the TKMS MEKO A200.
- Malaysia - Damen Schelde participated in the competition to supply the Royal Malaysian Navy with six frigates under the Second Generation Patrol Vessel program. It was chosen as the winner but unfortunately, Malaysia's Defence Minister had changed the result to the French Gowind class due to interference from Boustead Naval Shipyard. The other competitor was the MEKO A200.
- Oman - Oman had an interest in buying four SIGMA corvettes/frigates in March 2011. The Dutch queen Beatrix planned a state visit to Oman, one of the reasons for the visit being the potential sale of the ships to the Royal Navy of Oman. The official visit was cancelled due to the unrest in Oman at the time, although the queen did go to an unofficial dinner with the Sultan of Oman. The official visit took place later in January 2012. During the first visit to Oman, the Royal Netherlands Navy sent its air defence warfare frigate HNLMS De Ruyter to Muscat. In April 2012 it was announced that they lost to the Singaporean Al-Ofouq-class patrol vessel by ST Engineering. Damen had offered the SIGMA 7513.
- Philippines - Damen Schelde bought bidding documents but did not submit an offer.
- Poland - Damen Schelde submitted its SIGMA PL 10514 in two variants for the competition to supply the Polish Navy with options for their Miecznik & Czapla programmes. Miecznik will be a coastal defense ship and Czapla a patrol ship. Lost to the Arrowhead 140 design.
- Romania - Romania is planning to purchase four corvettes in the upcoming seven years, which have to be built and equipped in a Romanian building yard. Previously, in December 2016, the Romanian government decided that Damen Group would build four SIGMA light frigates for 1.6 billion euro at the Damen Galați Shipyard. However, the new Romanian government is repealing this decision and will re-open the procurement again. Nonetheless, Damen Group is a top contender for the job, since it has the only shipyard in Romania that has recent experience with building new naval ships reasonably fast and at a competitive price. In July 2019, the Romanian authorities announced the selection of Naval Group and its partner Santierul Naval Constanta (SNC) for the programme to build four new Gowind multi-mission corvettes.
- United Arab Emirates - Damen had submitted an offer (likely the SIGMA 9813 or SIGMA 9814) for the Abu Dhabi-class corvettes. It lost to a corvette based on the Italian Comandanti class.
- Vietnam - Vietnam in 2011 shows interest in buying four SIGMA corvette with two of them to be built by DSNS in Vietnam. The design were revealed to be SIGMA 9814 during Vietship 2014 Nava Exhibition in Vietnam. As of 2016 the program seems to be cancelled.

== Under construction ==
=== Mexico ===
Mexico has ordered 8 SIGMA 10514 LROPV based upon the Indonesian variant with different weapon systems and different role. The Mexican navy will use its SIGMA frigate as a long range patrol vessel. The keel was laid on 17 August 2017, and was launched on 23 November 2018 and service to begin in 2020. The ship will be built in six modules, with two of these modules built by Damen Schelde Naval Shipbuilding in Vlissingen in the Netherlands, and the remaining four by the Mexican Navy shipyard in Salina Cruz under the supervision of Damen Schelde Naval Shipbuilding. The SIGMA will replace the four Allende class (ex-USN Knox class), and two Bravo class (ex-USN Bronstein class) of frigates.

== Under development ==
=== Colombia ===
In September 2022, the Colombian Ministry of Defense announced that COTECMAR and Damen will co-develop five new frigates for the Colombian Navy based on the Sigma-class design. The Colombian Navy awarded a contract to COTECMAR to build the service's first frigate under the Strategic Surface Platform (Plataforma Estratégica de Superficie or PES) project on 22 November 2022. The ship's design was finalized in 2023 between Cotecmar and Damen Naval, construction can begin by 2025. In April 2024, the program were reported to have been facing problems and is expected to miss its planned construction date. In August 2024 it was reported that Damen and COTECMAR had signed a contract for the construction of a frigate based on the Sigma 10514 model. As part of the agreement Damen will supply technical support and components for the construction, while the frigate will be built by COTECMAR. Construction of the frigate is planned to begin in 2026 and to be completed in 2030.

In February 2025 Damen and Saab signed a contract for the delivery of the 9LV combat management system and 9LV fire control system, alongside radar and sensors systems. These systems include the Ceros 200 radar, EOS 500 electro-optical fire control director and Giraffe 4A radars. The following month, in March, a contract was signed between Damen and Heinen & Hopman for the delivery of the overall HVAC-R system. That same month Damen also signed a contract with BAE Systems to supply a Bofors 40 Mk4 naval gun system. In June 2025 Damen selected Alewijnse to integrate all major electrical systems aboard the PES frigate. Later that month it was reported that Kongsberg had been selected to supply twin controllable pitch propellers (CPPs) and shaftlines for the frigate. In September it became known that De Jong & Lavino was selected for the delivery of all steel materials needed to build the PES frigate. In October Damen and Terma signed a contract for the supply of the C-Guard Decoy Launching System.

In January 2026 it was reported that Georg Fischer had been contracted for the PES project. The following month it was announced that first steel had been cut at the Mamonal facility of COTECMAR, which officially marks the start of construction. The frigate will be built by making use of a modular block strategy, with a total of 52 steel blocks being used to assemble the hull.

== Variants ==
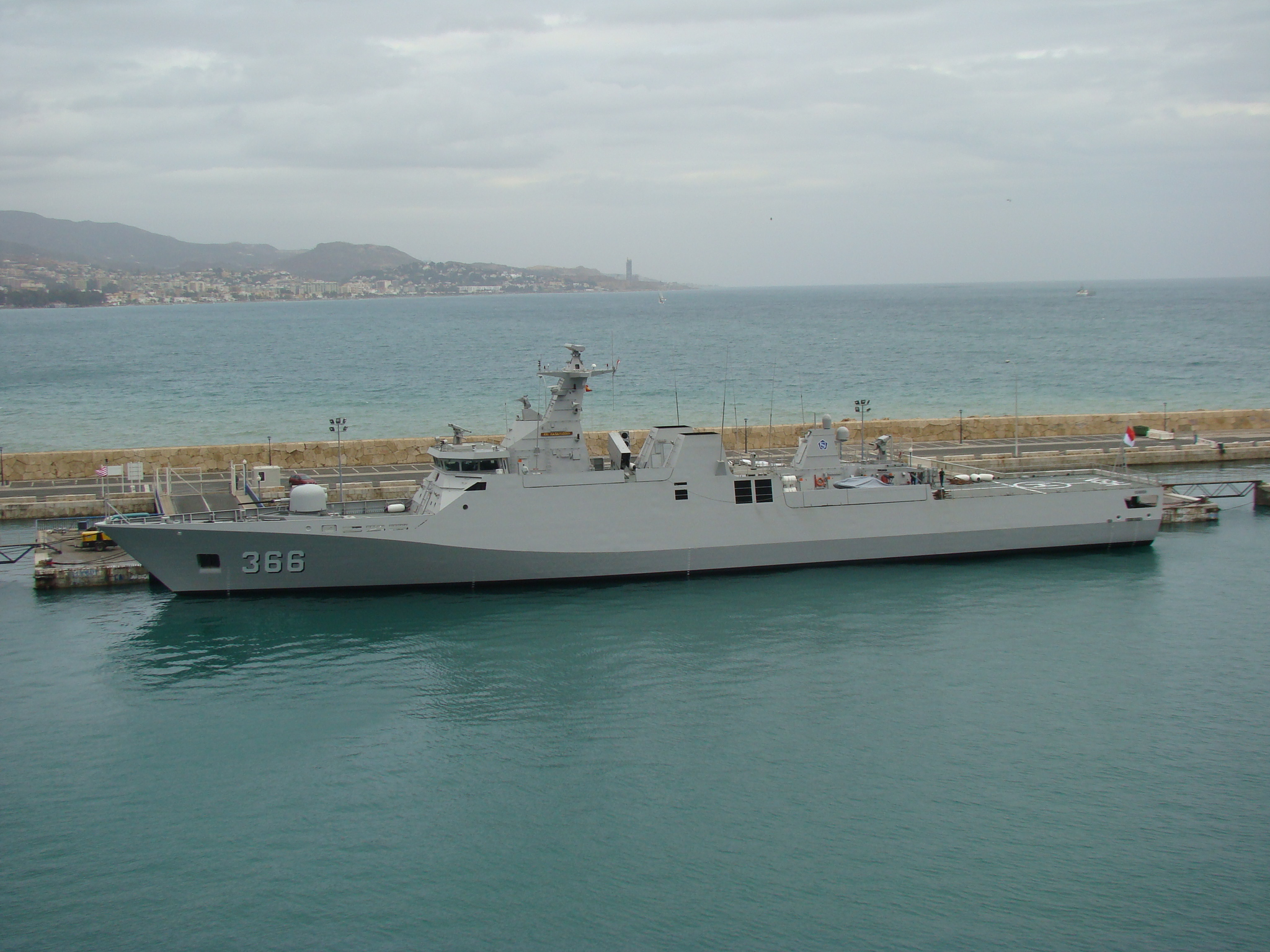
Indonesian Navy SIGMA 9113 corvette, KRI Sultan Hasanuddin (366).

=== Indonesia ===
==== SIGMA 9113 ====
The Indonesian variant is based on the SIGMA 9113 design. Work on the first of the class, KRI Diponegoro (365), began with the first steel cutting conducted in October 2004. The ship was christened on 16 September 2006 and commissioned on 2 July 2007 by Admiral Slamet Soebijanto, Indonesian Navy Chief of Staff.

Options for two other units were exercised in January 2006 with the first steel cut commenced on 3 April 2006 in Damen's Schelde Naval Shipbuilding yard, Vlissingen-Oost yard and not in Surabaya as stated earlier.

On 28 August 2007, Jane's Missiles and Rockets reported that Indonesia was having problems securing the export license for the MM40 Exocet block II and was considering Chinese made C-802 anti-ship missiles as alternatives. However, the ships have already been delivered with the Exocet missiles.

In 2018 Thales has upgraded the Indonesian Navy's Diponegoro-class corvette through the installation and refurbishment of the Kingklip hull-mounted sonar system.

In 2019 the Diponegoro-class corvettes were upgraded with MM40 Exocet block III missile.

On 31 August 2021, Terma announced that they have been awarded a contract for the upgrade of existing C-Guard systems with Anti-Submarine Warfare (ASW) capabilities for the Sigma-Class Corvettes of the Indonesian Navy. This C-Guard ASW upgrade program is a follow-on from the previous ASW upgrade contract awarded in 2019 for the same class of ships.

On 4 November 2022, Thales has signed a contract with PT. Len to undertake the refurbishment of the integrated mission systems for Diponegoro-class ships. The corvettes will be updated with Thales TACTICOS Baseline 2 combat management system (CMS) and the Naval Smarter (NS) NS50 radar system.

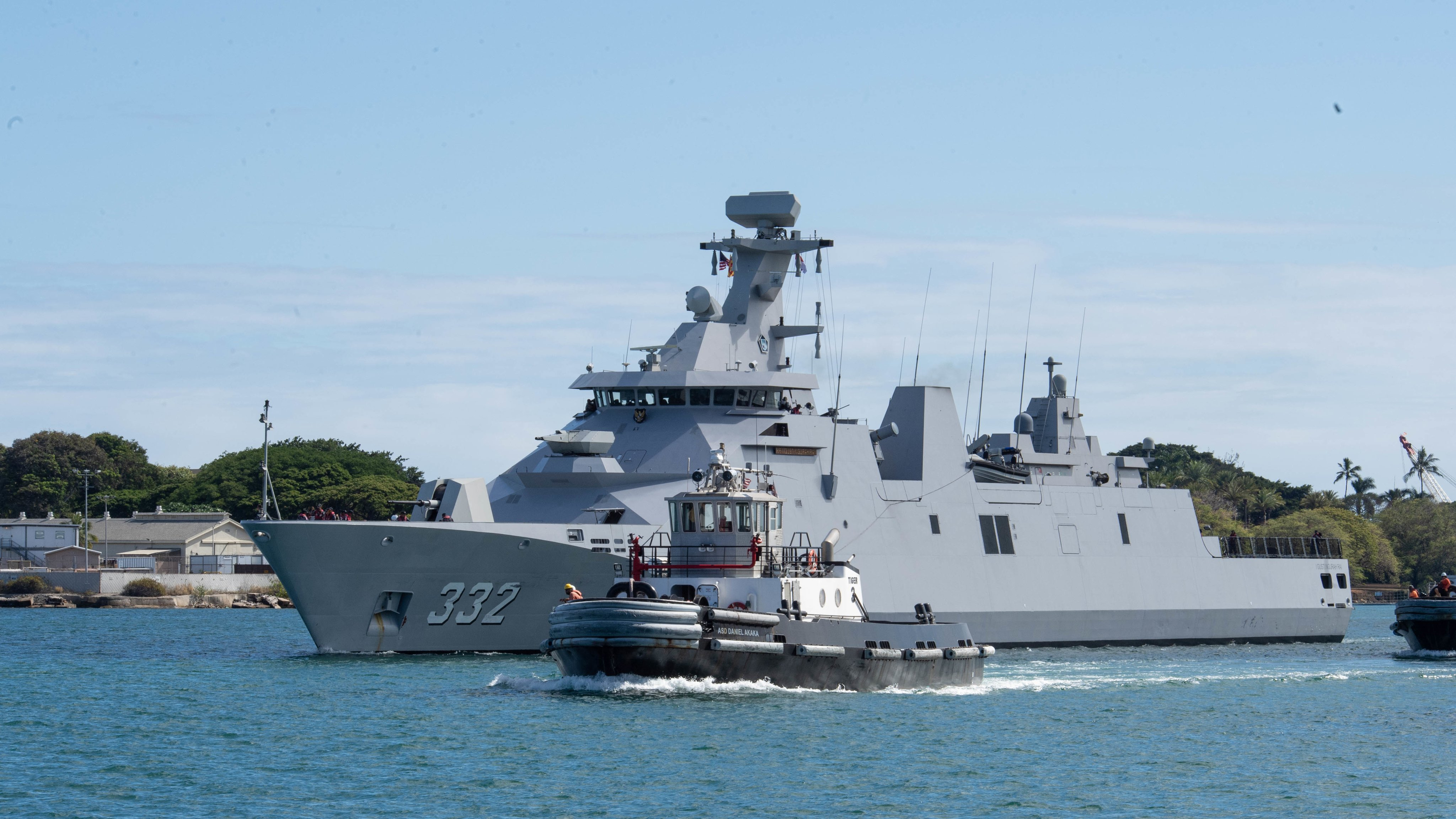
Indonesian Navy SIGMA 10514 frigate, KRI I Gusti Ngurah Rai (332) arriving at Pearl Harbor to participate in RIMPAC 2022.

==== SIGMA 10514 ====
On the 16 August 2010, Indonesian Defense Ministry, signed a deal with PT PAL Indonesia and Damen Schelde to build a 105-meter frigate in Indonesia based on Damen Schelde SIGMA 10514 design. For the first ship, five modules for the ship will be built in Indonesia and the Dutch manufacturer Damen Schelde will build 2 modules while for the second ship the Indonesians will build six modules and Damen Schelde will build one module.

On 1 February 2013 it was announced that a second unit will be built by Damen Schelde Naval Shipbuilding and PT PAL Surabaya, the second contract includes torpedo tubes, combat control room and a couple of surface weapons.

They were built without several of their main system and equipment, namely VL-MICA, MM40 Exocet block III, Rheinmetall Millennium CIWS, Electronic warfare system and were planned to be installed later on (FFBNW).

As of December 2015, the first ship, KRI Raden Eddy Martadinata (331), was 85% complete and the ship was launched on 18 January 2016. On 7 April 2017 the first ship, KRI Raden Eddy Martadinata (331), was commissioned at Tanjung Priok. The second ship, KRI I Gusti Ngurah Rai (332), was commissioned on 10 January 2018.

The class finally received their full complement of FFBNW system and equipment in December 2019 for KRI Raden Eddy Martadinata (331) and March 2020 for KRI I Gusti Ngurah Rai (332).

=== Morocco ===
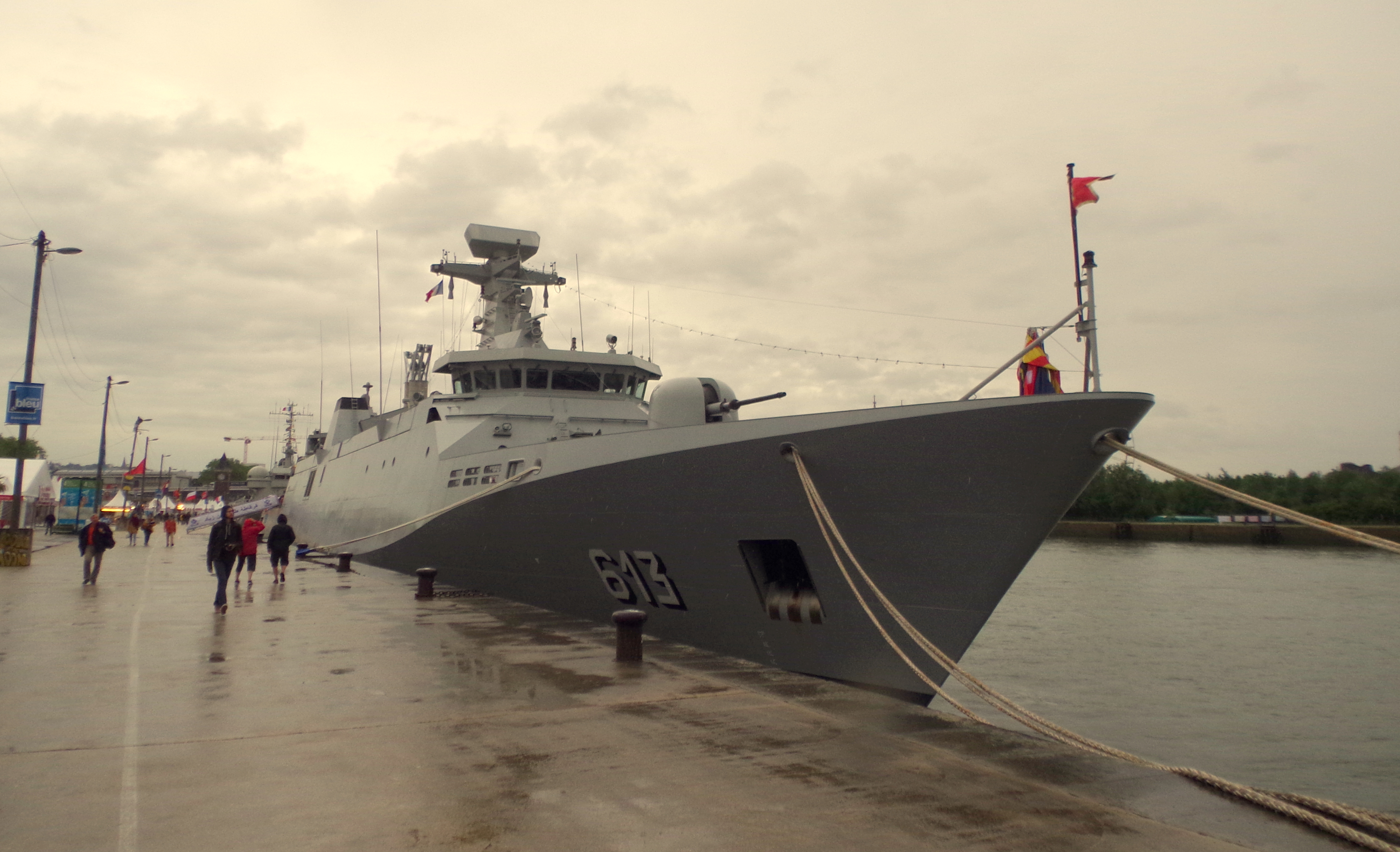
Royal Moroccan Navy SIGMA 10513 frigate, Tarik Ben Ziyad (613).

On 6 February 2008, Morocco signed a USD$1.2 billion contract with Schelde Naval Shipbuilding for two light frigate SIGMA 9813 and one light frigate SIGMA 10513, which are modified versions of the existing SIGMA-class design.

A subsequent contract was signed on 1 April 2008 with Thales Nederland for the supply and installation of the command and control and sensor package for the ships. The package included TACTICOS combat management system, SMART-S Mk2 surveillance radar, LIROD Mk2 tracking radar, Thales KINGKLIP sonar system, IFF system, Integrated communication system comprising external communication system and FOCON internal communication system, two Target Designation Sights, VIGILE ESM system, SCORPION ECM system, and the integrated navigation system.

The first frigate for Morocco, Tarik ben Ziyad, was launched in July 2010, began sea trials on 6 May 2011 and was delivered on 12 September 2011. The second ship was launched on 2 February 2011, with sea trials planned for late in the year. The third ship was planned to be launched in September 2011.

=== Mexico ===
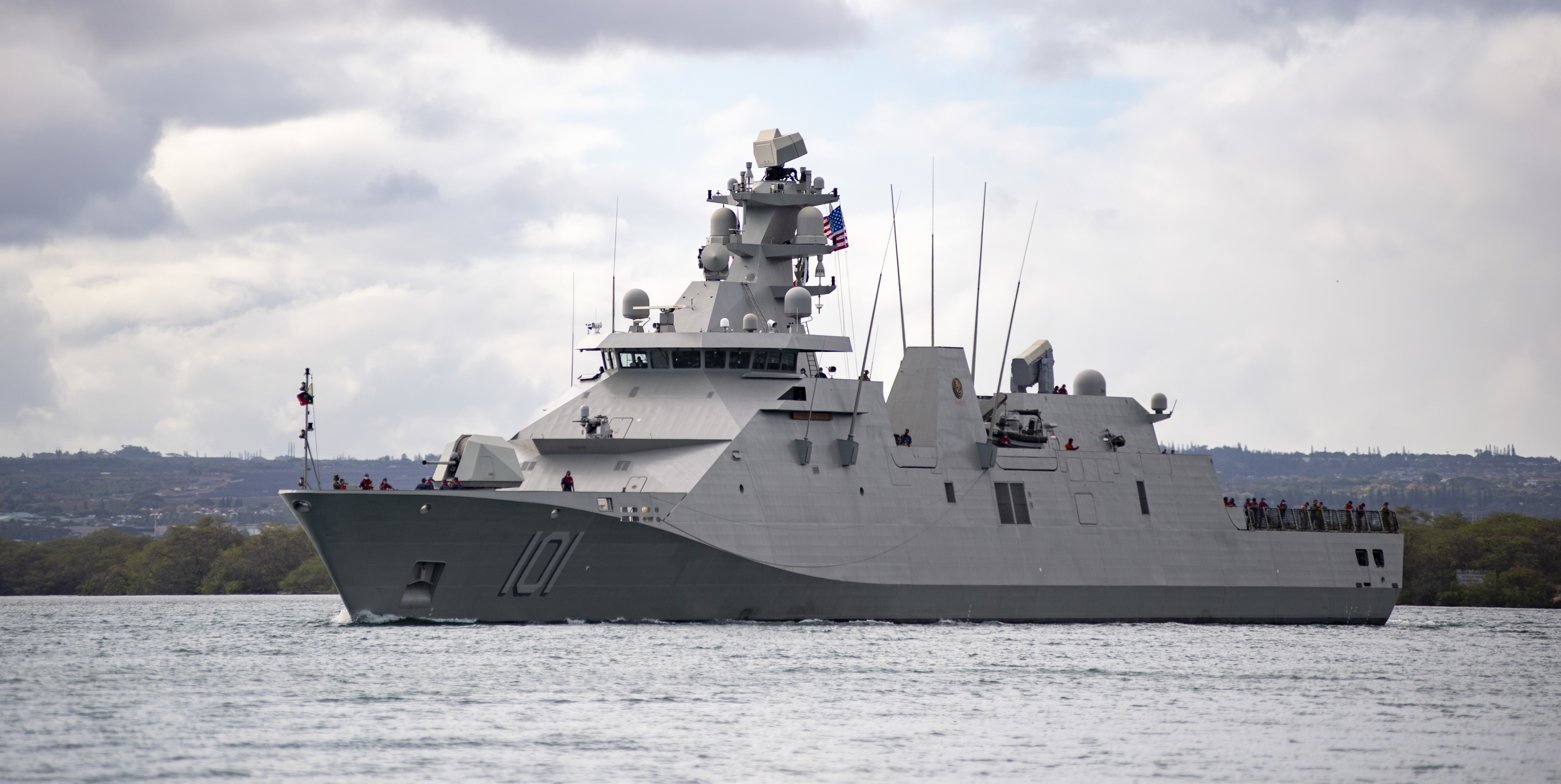
Mexican Navy SIGMA 10514 POLA frigate, ARM Benito Juárez (F 101) departs Pearl Harbor to begin the at-sea phase of Rim of the Pacific (RIMPAC) 2022, July 12.

On 18 August 2017, Damen announced the keel laying for one SIGMA 10514 Long Range Ocean Patrol Vessel (SIGMA 10514 LROPV/ SIGMA 10514 POLA) at Damen Schelde Naval Shipyard in Vlissingen for the Mexican Navy. The vessel was constructed modularly in six modules, two modules were constructed in Vlissingen and the other four modules in Mexico.

According to the Defense Security Cooperation Agency Major Arms Sale notification on 5 January 2018, the primary weapon systems for the SIGMA class will include RGM-84L Harpoon Block II, RIM-162 ESSM with eight cell MK 56 VLS launcher, MK 54 Mod 0 lightweight torpedoes with two MK 32 Surface Vessel Torpedo Tubes (SVTT) triple tube launchers, Block II Rolling Airframe Missile (RAM) missiles and Bofors 57 mm gun.

In April 2018 Damen Group contracted Spanish defense technology company Indra to equip the Mexican Navy's new long-range offshore patrol vessel (POLA) with its RIGEL electronic defense system.

== Ships of the class ==
Name	Pennant	Builder	Laid down	Launched	Commissioned	Notes
Indonesian Navy
SIGMA 9113 design
KRI Diponegoro	365	Damen, Vlissingen	24 March 2005	16 September 2006	5 July 2007	Diponegoro, a National Hero from Central Java.
KRI Sultan Hasanuddin	366	Damen, Vlissingen	24 March 2005	16 September 2006	24 November 2007	Sultan Hasanuddin, a National Hero from South Sulawesi.
KRI Sultan Iskandar Muda	367	Damen, Vlissingen	8 May 2006	24 November 2007	18 October 2008	Sultan Iskandar Muda, a National Hero from Aceh.
KRI Frans Kaisiepo	368	Damen, Vlissingen	8 May 2006	28 June 2008	7 March 2009	Frans Kaisiepo, a National Hero from Papua and the fourth Governor of Papua province.
SIGMA 10514 design
KRI Raden Eddy Martadinata	331	Damen, Vlissingen PAL Indonesia, Surabaya	16 April 2014	18 January 2016	7 April 2017	Named after Raden Eddy Martadinata, a national hero from Bandung and one of the founders of the Indonesian Navy.
KRI I Gusti Ngurah Rai	332	Damen, Vlissingen PAL Indonesia, Surabaya	18 January 2016	29 September 2016	10 January 2018	Named after I Gusti Ngurah Rai, a national hero from Bali Island and leader of the Puputan War against the Dutch colonialist government.
Royal Moroccan Navy
SIGMA 10513 design
Tarik Ben Ziyad	613	Damen, Vlissingen	April 2008	12 July 2010	23 December 2011	Now shows on AIS as Sultan Moulay Ismail.
SIGMA 9813 design
Sultan Moulay Ismail	614	Damen, Vlissingen	March 2009	2 February 2011	10 March 2012	
Allal Ben Abdellah	615	Damen, Vlissingen	September 2009	October 2011	8 September 2012	
Mexican Navy
SIGMA 10514 LROPV/POLA design
ARM Benito Juárez	101	Damen, Vlissingen ASTIMAR 20, Salina Cruz	17 August 2017	23 November 2018	10 February 2020	ARM Benito Juárez (F 101) was formerly named ARM Reformador (P 101) being renamed in March 2020.

== See also ==
- List of naval ship classes in service
- Martadinata-class frigate (an Indonesian frigate class based on the SIGMA 10514 design)

Equivalent warship designs of the same era

- MEKO
- Gowind
