= Martadinata-class frigate =

Frigate class of the Indonesian Navy

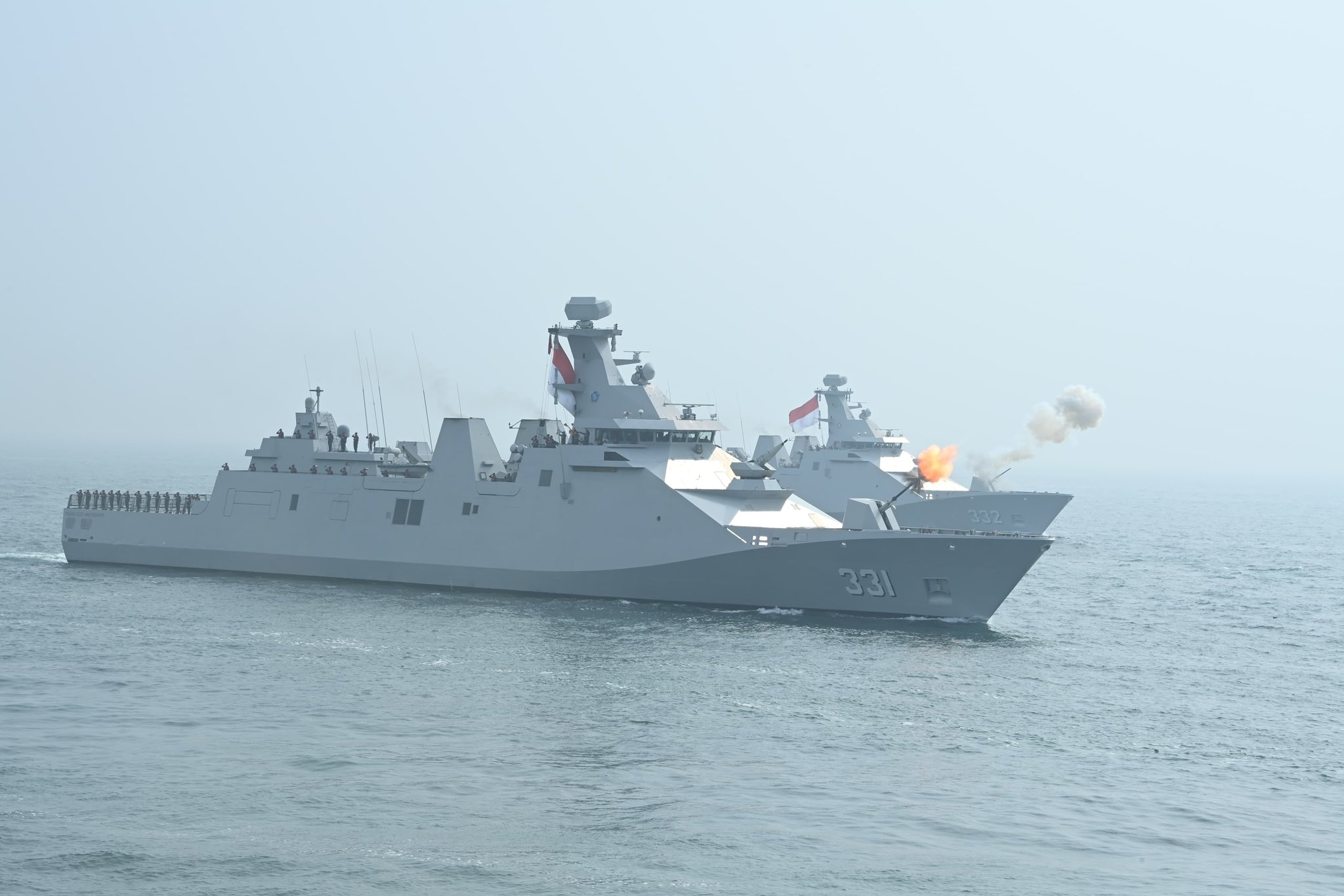
- Two Martadinata-class frigates, September 2024

Class overview
- Builders: Damen Schelde Naval Shipbuilding; PT PAL Indonesia
- Operators: Indonesian Navy
- Preceded by: Ahmad Yani class
- Succeeded by: Brawijaya class; Balaputradewa class; İstif class
- Cost: US$222 million (hull only)
- Built: 2014–2018
- In commission: 2017–present
- Planned: 4
- Completed: 2
- Cancelled: 2
- Active: 2

General characteristics
- Type: Guided-missile frigate
- Displacement: 2,365 tons; 2,946 tons (full load)
- Length: 105.11 m (344 ft 10 in)
- Beam: 14.02 m (46 ft 0 in)
- Draft: 3.75 m (12 ft 4 in)
- Propulsion: Combined Diesel or Electric (CODOE); 2 x 10000 kW MCR diesel propulsions; 2 x 1300 kW MCR electric propulsions; 2 x shafts with controllable pitch propellers
- Speed: 28 knots (52 km/h; 32 mph) on maximum power; 15 knots (28 km/h; 17 mph) on Electric-propulsion
- Range: 5,000 nmi (9,300 km; 5,800 mi) at 14 knots (26 km/h; 16 mph)
- Endurance: 20 days at sea
- Boats & landing craft carried: 2 x RHIB
- Complement: 122 persons
- Sensors & processing systems: Combat management system: Thales TACTICOS Baseline 2 CMS (10x MOC Mk.4 consoles); Surveillance radar: Thales SMART-S Mk2 3D Air and surface surveillance radar; Fire control system: Thales STIR 1.2 EO Mk2 Radar/EO fire control system; Sonar: Thales UMS 4132 KINGKLIP Medium frequency active/passive ASW hull-mounted sonar; Datalink: Thales Link-Y Mk2 Datalink system; IFF system: Thales TSB2520 IFF system
- Electronic warfare & decoys: ESM: Thales Vigile 100S Mk2 Tactical multi-purpose RESM; ECM: Thales Scorpion 2L RECM; Decoy launchers: Terma SKWS DL-12T 130 mm 12-tube decoy launcher
- Armament: Guns: 1 x OTO Melara Super Rapid 76 mm main gun; 1 x Rheinmetall Oerlikon Millennium Gun 35 mm CIWS; 2 x Denel Vektor GA-1 20 mm secondary guns; Missiles: 12 x VL MICA-M short-ranged surface-to-air missiles; 8 x Exocet MM40 Block III antiship cruise missiles; Torpedoes: 2 x WASS B515/3 triple-tubed torpedo launchers; WASS A244-S Mod.3 324 mm lightweight torpedoes
- Aircraft carried: 1 x Eurocopter AS565 Panther
- Aviation facilities: Helicopter deck and centerline hangar

The Raden Eddy Martadinata class of guided-missile frigates of the Indonesian Navy are SIGMA 10514 types of the Netherlands-designed Sigma family of modular naval vessels, named after Indonesian Admiral Raden Eddy Martadinata. The frigates are each built from six modules or sections, four built at the PT PAL shipyard at Surabaya, the other two at Damen Schelde Naval Shipbuilding in the Netherlands.

These warships were designed as multi-mission frigates, able to fulfill the anti-aircraft warfare role with surface-to-air missiles, anti-surface warfare with Exocet missiles, anti-submarine warfare with hull mounted sonar, torpedoes and ASW Helicopters.

== Design and description ==
Martadinata-class frigates have a length of 105.11 m (344.85 ft), a width of 14.2 m (46.59 ft), have a maximum speed of up to 28 kn (51.86 km/h; 32.22 mph), can sail up to 5,000 nmi (9,260.00 km; 5,753.90 mi) at a speed of 14 kn (25.93 km/h; 16.11 mph) and have a sailing endurance of up to 20 days. These ships are equipped with modern weaponry integrated into the combat management system (CMS). In addition, they feature a stealth design characterized by a low radar cross-section, low infrared signature, and low noise signature, making them more difficult to detect by other ships' radars. They are also capable of conducting surface, air, underwater, and electronic warfare.

== History ==
On 5 June 2012, the Indonesian Ministry of Defense officially signed a procurement contract with DSNS to build the first Sigma 10514 frigate for the Indonesian Navy with a value of $220 million. The procurement of this ship aims to strengthen the Indonesian Navy's arsenal and provide a deterrent effect on any party who intends to disrupt Indonesia's sovereignty and territorial integrity. The Transfer of Technology (ToT) scheme was applied during the construction of this ship to PT PAL Indonesia. In February 2013, a contract for the construction of the second Sigma frigate was signed.

KRI Raden Eddy Martadinata (331), lead ship of her class, was commissioned on 7 April 2017 at Tanjung Priok. The second ship, KRI I Gusti Ngurah Rai (332), was launched in September 2016. I Gusti Ngurah Rai was delivered on 30 October 2017. On 2 November 2017, it was reported that there was still work that needed to be completed in both Indonesia and the Netherlands before the ship will be ready for service. There will also be an estimated three-month training period for her crew as well. The second frigate was commissioned on 10 January 2018.

These ship were built without several of their main system and equipment fitted, namely VL-MICA surface-to-air missile, MM40 Exocet block III anti-ship missile, Rheinmetall Millennium close-in weapon system and their main electronic warfare system (ECM/ESM). They were planned to be installed later on (FFBNW) during their lifetime. The class finally received their full complement of FFBNW system and equipment in December 2019 for KRI Raden Eddy Martadinata (331) and March 2020 for KRI I Gusti Ngurah Rai (332).

Indonesia has decided not to continue the Martadinata-class project, despite its potential, due to DSNS—the project's designer—not fulfilling its commitment to invest in Indonesia. Instead, DSNS established a branch at Damen Song Cam Shipyard in Haiphong, Vietnam, which led to Indonesia's dissatisfaction and the decision to halt the program.

== Ships of class ==
Prefix	Ship name	Hull no.	Builder	Laid down	Launched	Commissioned	Home port	Status
KRI	Raden Eddy Martadinata	331	DSNS PT PAL	16 April 2014	18 January 2016	7 April 2017	Surabaya	Active
KRI	I Gusti Ngurah Rai	332	DSNS PT PAL	18 January 2016	29 September 2016	10 January 2018	Surabaya	Active

== Gallery ==
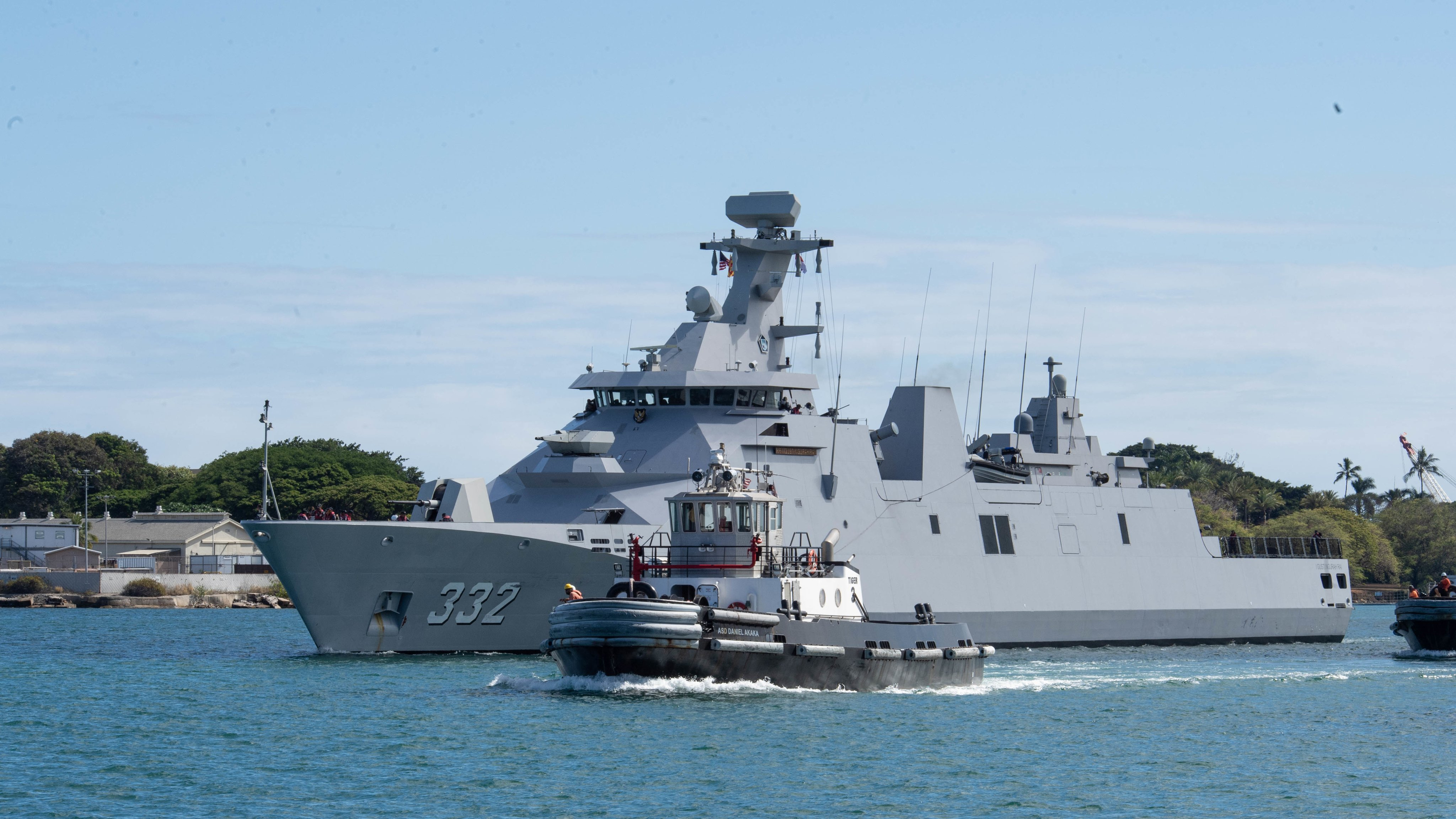
Indonesia frigate KRI I Gusti Ngurah Rai (332) arriving at Pearl Harbor to participate in RIMPAC 2022

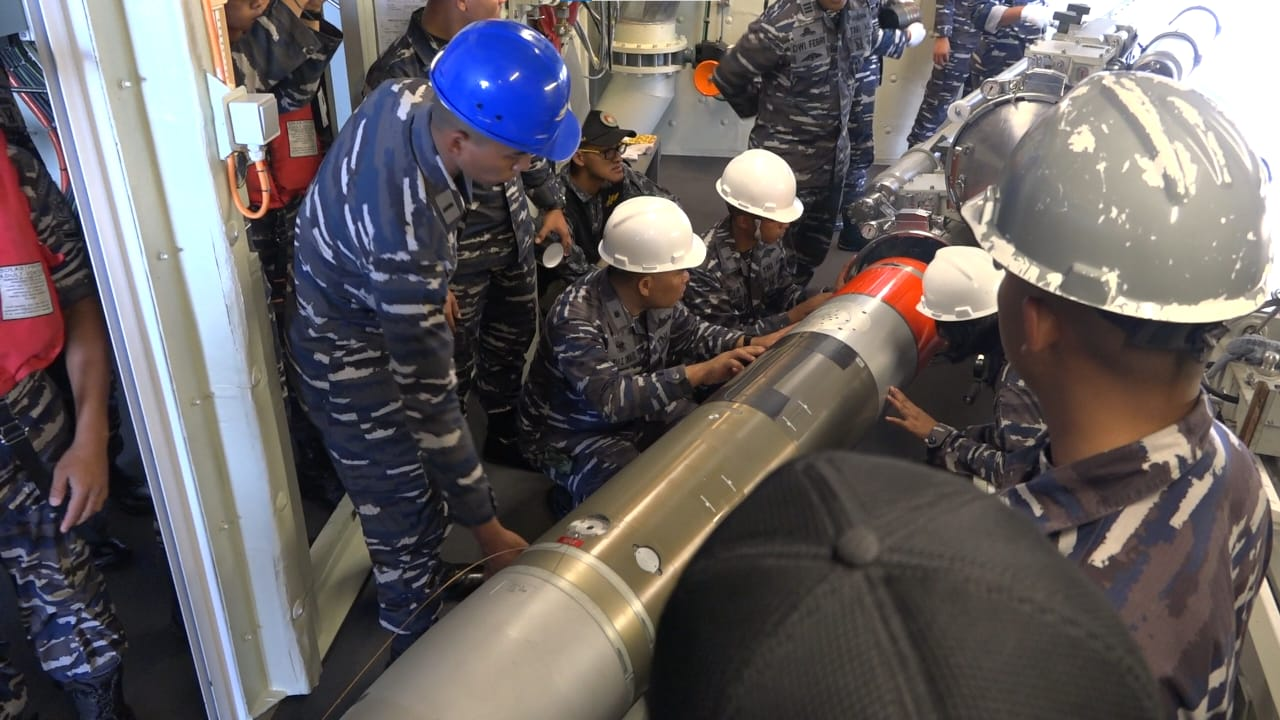
KRI Raden Eddy Martadinata (331) crew during torpedo firing exercise

== See also ==
Equivalent modern guided-missile frigates

- Daegu-class – (South Korea)
