= MICA (missile) =

Missile d'Interception, de Combat et d'Auto-défense
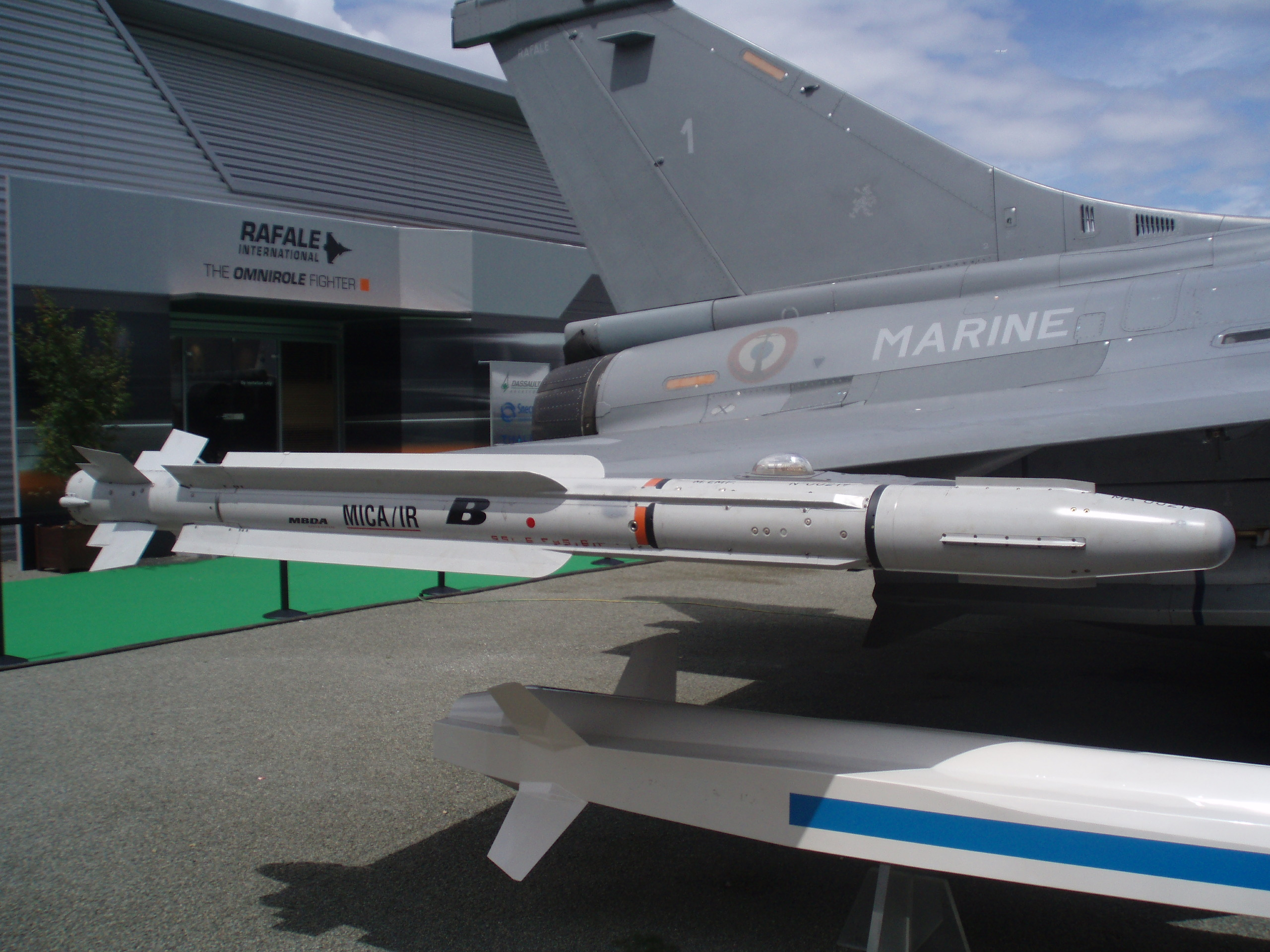
- An air-launched MICA IR on a Dassault Rafale
- Type: Beyond-visual-range air-to-air missile; Short range surface-to-air missile (VL MICA)
- Place of origin: France

Service history
- In service: 1996–present
- Used by: See Operators

Production history
- Manufacturer: MBDA France

Specifications
- Mass: 112 kg (247 lb)
- Length: 3.1 m (10 ft)
- Diameter: 160 mm (6.3 in)
- Warhead: 12 kg (26 lb) warhead
- Detonation mechanism: Proximity or direct impact
- Engine: Solid-propellant rocket motor
- Operational range: Air-launched : 60–80 km (37–50 mi); Vertical Launch : 20 km (12 mi)
- Flight altitude: Vertical Launch : 9 km (30,000 ft)
- Maximum speed: Mach 4
- Guidance system: Midcourse: Inertial guidance; Datalink; Terminal: MICA-RF: Active radar homing; MICA-IR: Infrared homing; MICA-EM: Active radar homing
- Launch platform: Dassault Rafale; Mirage 2000; Mirage F1; Su-30MKI; Ground batteries; Surface vessels; Submarines

The MICA (French: Missile d'Interception, de Combat et d'Auto-défense, lit. 'Missile for Interception, Combat and Self-defense') is a French anti-air multi-target, all weather, fire-and-forget short to medium-range missile system manufactured by MBDA France. It is intended for use both by air platforms as individual missiles as well as ground units and ships, which can be equipped with the rapid fire MICA Vertical Launch System. It is fitted with a thrust vector control (TVC) system. It was developed from 1982 onward by Matra. The first trials occurred in 1991, and the missile was commissioned in 1996 to equip the Rafale and Mirage 2000. It is a replacement for both the Super 530 in the interception role and the Magic II in the dogfighting role. Both MICA-EM and MICA-IR variants can fulfill the roles of short-range and medium range BVR air-to-air missiles.

On 11 June 2007, a MICA launched from a Rafale successfully demonstrated its over-the-shoulder capability by destroying a target behind the launch aircraft. The target was designated by another aircraft and coordinates were transmitted via Link 16.

== Characteristics ==
There are two MICA variants; MICA RF has an active radar homing seeker and MICA IR has an imaging infra-red homing seeker. Both seekers are designed to filter out counter-measures such as chaff and decoy flares. A thrust vector control unit fitted to the rocket motor increases the missile's agility. The missile is capable of lock-on after launch (LOAL) which means it is capable of engaging targets outside its seeker's at-launch acquisition range. Mounted on the Rafale, the MICA IR can provide IR imagery to the central data processing system, thus acting as an extra sensor.

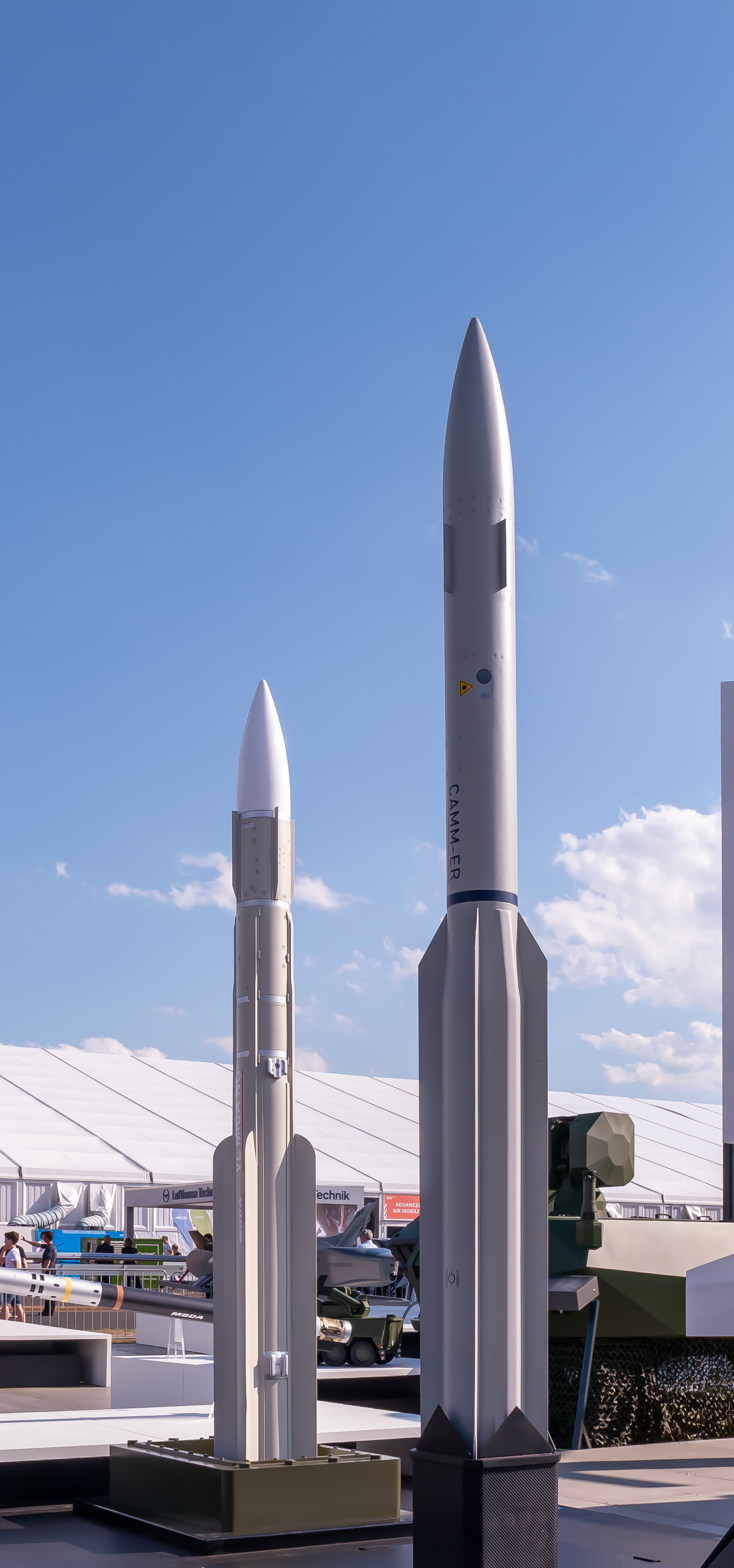
VL MICA NG (left), next to a CAMM-ER (right) at the ILA Berlin Air Show 2024

MICA can also be employed as a short-range surface-to-air missile. It is available in a ground-based version, VL MICA, fired from a truck-mounted box launcher, and a naval version, VL MICA-M, fired from a ship-fitted vertical launch system. On 23 October 2008, 15:30, at CELM, Biscarosse (Landes), a VL MICA missile successfully performed the last of its 14 test firings meaning it is now ready for mass production. The target drone was flying at low level, over the sea, 12 km away; despite this distance, MICA, equipped with an active radar seeker, locked on the target and shot it down.

Corvettes too small to have the big and costly Aster missile system are the most likely customers for the VL MICA-M, which offers similar capability as the Aster 15 but without its booster and PIF-PAF vectorial control.

While the VL MICA has an advertised range of 20 km, aerodynamic performance is significantly degraded at those ranges. From 0 to 7 km MICA has maneuverability of 50g, however by 12 km this is reduced to 30g as energy is lost.

== Variants ==
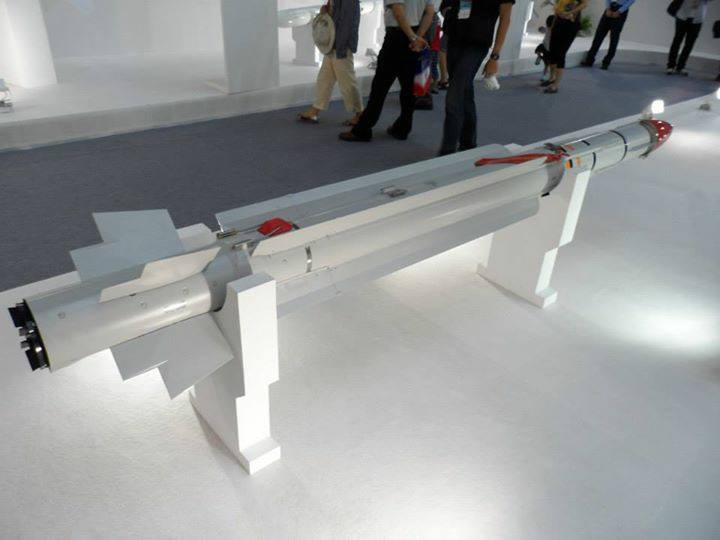
Mock-up of a MBDA MICA missile in Taiwan

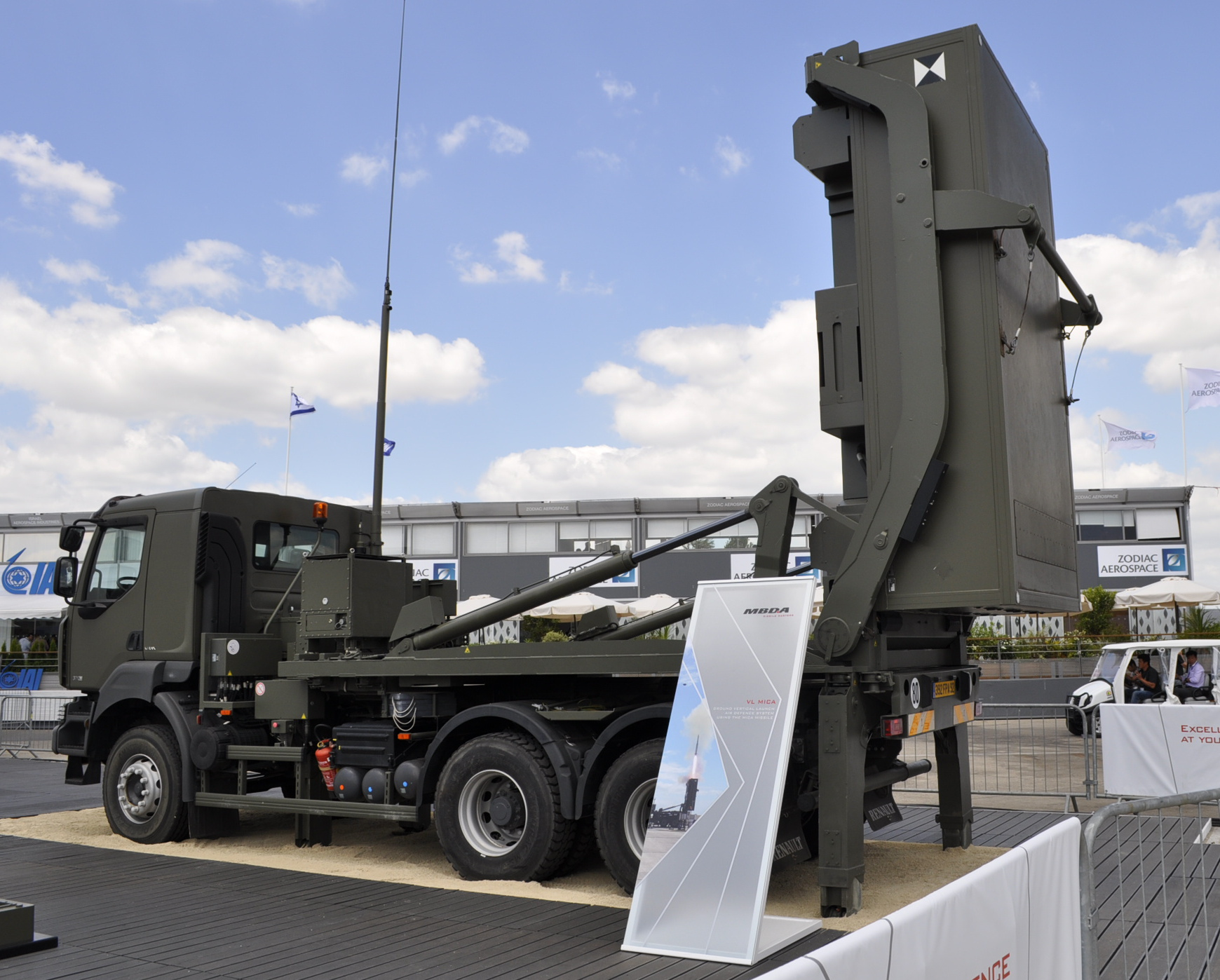
MICA SAM Launcher at the Paris Air Show 2015

- MICA RF or EM (électromagnétique)
- MICA IR (infrarouge/infrared)
- VL MICA RF/EM
- VL MICA IR
- VL MICA-M RF/EM
- VL MICA-M IR
- A3SM: Submarine-launched version. Installed in Barracuda-class nuclear-fueled attack subs of the French Navy.
- MICA NG: Second generation of MICA designed against stealthy targets. Infrared seeker will use a matrix sensor providing greater sensitivity. The radio frequency seeker will use an AESA. The range has been increased by up to 40% over the standard MICA.

== Operators ==
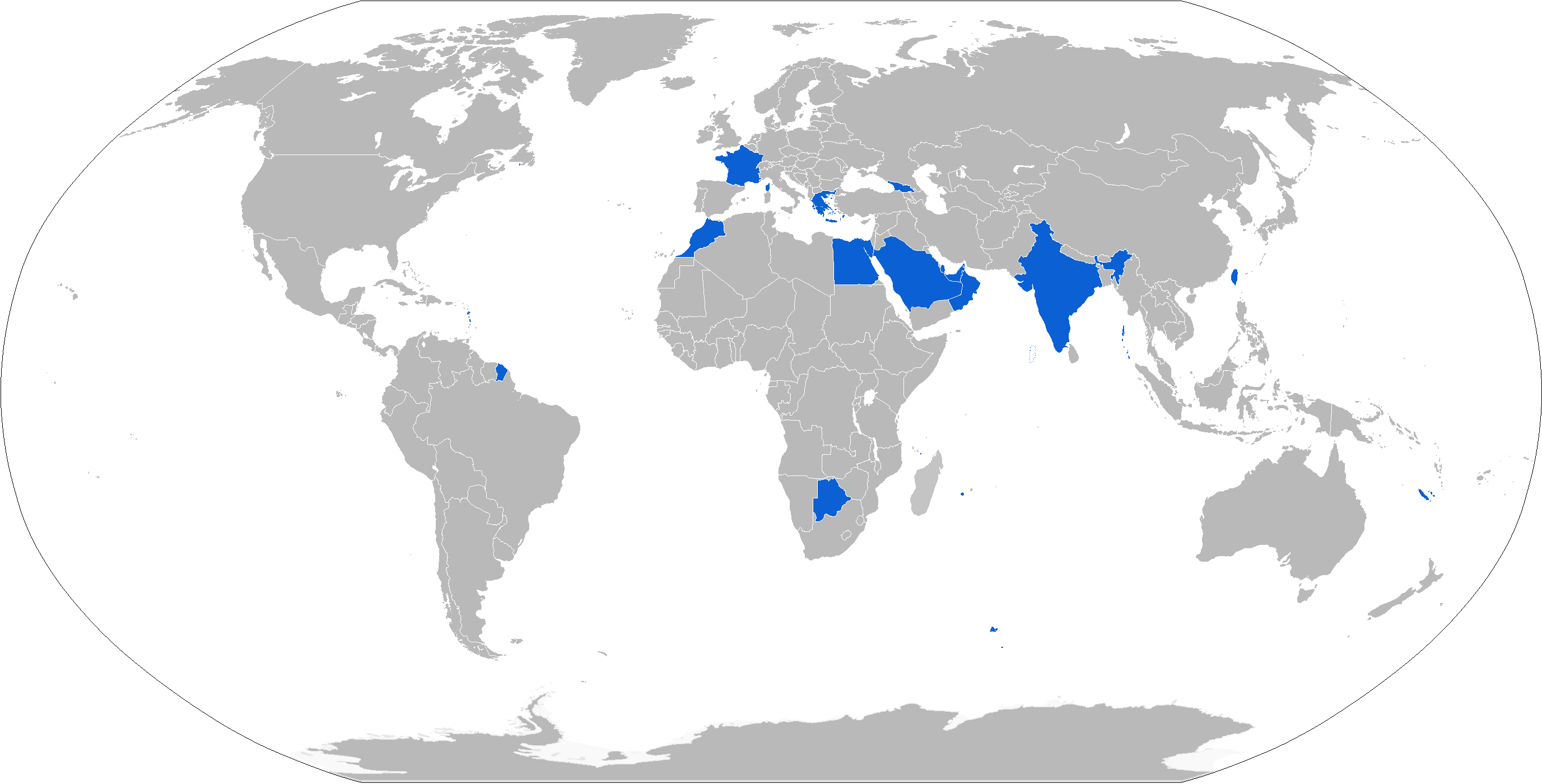
Map of MICA operators in blue

=== Current operators ===
==== Air-to-air missile ====
Croatia
Croatian Air Force: With the purchase of the Rafale F3R fighter jets come MICA missiles in radar-guided and infrared versions.
Egypt
Egyptian Air Force: MICA EM/IR and MICA NG EM/IR purchased in 2025.
France
French Air and Space Force: used on Mirage 2000-5, Mirage 2000D RMV and Rafale aircraft.
French Navy: used on Rafale M aircraft.
Greece
Hellenic Air Force: MICA EM/IR on Mirage 2000 and Rafale fighters.
India
Indian Air Force: 200 MICA-IR and 1000 MICA-RF missiles are integrated on upgraded Mirage 2000 and Rafale. First inducted in 2016 for Mirage 2000. Indian Air Force successfully tested MICA missile from its aircraft Sukhoi Su-30MKI. The Air Force will also establish and operate an MRO facility for the missiles after an agreement with MBDA for supply of industrial machinery, tools and data packages as well as training and technical support.
Morocco
Royal Moroccan Air Force, 150 missiles ordered in 2005.
Qatar
Qatar Emiri Air Force, 100 MICA-EM ordered in 1994, 150 MICA-IR + 150 MICA-EM ordered in 2015.
Taiwan
Republic of China Air Force: The National Chung-Shan Institute of Science and Technology was tasked with upgrading the existing MICA missile in 2016.
Ukraine
On 23 October 2024, Sébastien Lecornu, French Armed Forces Minister, announced that France would send the first of three Mirage 2000s to Ukraine by March 2025. These aircraft would be capable of carrying SCALP-EG and MICA missiles, have updated electronic warfare systems and that Ukrainian pilots were trained in their usage.
United Arab Emirates
United Arab Emirates Air Force: on the Mirage 2000, 500 missiles ordered in 1998.

==== Surface-to-air missile ====
Botswana
Botswana Ground Force: MICA-VL on erector launcher, acquired in 2016.
France
French Air Force: 1 ordered for the 2024 Paris Olympic Games, and entered service in summer 2024. 9 to be in service by 2030, 12 by 2035.
Launchers on Mercedes-Benz Zetros 6×6, the Thales Ground Master 200 radar and the TOC (Tactical Operations Center) are each installed on a Mercedes-Benz Actros 8×8.
Morocco
Royal Moroccan Army: 4 batteries Ground based VL MICA. 200 missiles ordered for those systems in 2020.
Oman
Royal Army of Oman Ground based VL MICA (first client 1 battery ordered in 2009, delivered in 2012, 50 missiles).
Saudi Arabia
Saudi Arabia National Guard Air Defence: VL-MICA., 5 batteries ordered in 2013 with 250 missiles.
Thailand
Royal Thai Army: 1 VL MICA battery, 50 missiles ordered in 2016.

==== Naval surface-to-air missile ====
Egypt
VL MICA-M installed on 4 Gowind-class corvettes (16 VLS), 75 missiles purchased with that contract.
VL-MICA-M installed on 4 MEKO-A200-EN with each 32 × VLS for MBDA MICA-NG, 200 missiles purchased with that contract.
75 missiles purchased.
Indonesia
Indonesian Navy: VL MICA-M installed on Martadinata-class frigate.
- 40 MICA missiles purchased in 2018.
Morocco
Royal Moroccan Navy: VL MICA-M installed on Sigma-class design.
Philippines
Philippine Navy: VL-MICA installed on Miguel Malvar-class frigates.
Oman
Royal Navy of Oman: VL MICA-M used on the Khareef-class corvettes (ordered in 2008, delivered in 2013-14, 60 missiles).
Qatar
Qatari Emiri Navy, 2 patrol ships Musherib class with each 8 VLS MICA, and 30 missiles ordered in 2016.
Saudi Arabia
Saudi Arabia Navy: VL MICA-M. ordered for 5 Avante-2200 frigates, ordered in 2018 with 120 missiles.
Singapore
Republic of Singapore Navy: 8 Independence-class littoral mission vessel are equipped with the VL MICA-M, 150 missiles ordered for it in 2013.
United Arab Emirates
United Arab Emirates Navy: VL MICA-M on Falaj 2-class patrol vessel, 20 missiles ordered for 2 corvettes.

=== Future operators ===
==== Air-to-air missile ====
Serbia
Serbian air force: 12 Rafale F4 ordered in 2024, to be equipped with the MICA NG.

==== Surface-to-air missile ====
Denmark
Danish Armed Forces: 2 fire units of the VL MICA GBAD system ordered in July 2025.

==== Naval surface-to-air missile ====
Bulgaria
Bulgarian Navy: The Bulgarian government concluded the purchase of VL MICA for the two future patrol ships of the Bulgarian Navy.
Malaysia
Royal Malaysian Navy: VL MICA-M has been selected for the future Maharaja Lela-class frigates.
Ukraine
Sébastien Lecornu, French Armed Forces Minister, announced that France would send the first of three Mirage 2000s to Ukraine by March 2025. These aircraft would be capable of carrying SCALP-EG and MICA missiles, have updated electronic warfare systems and that Ukrainian pilots were to be trained in their usage.

=== Potential operators ===
==== Surface-to-air missile ====
Armenia
Armenian Armed Forces – French Defense Minister Sébastien Lecornu mentioned its possible sale during his visit to Armenia in February 2024.

==== Naval underwater-to-air missile ====
France
French Navy: on the SNLE 3G and / or the Suffren class.
India
Indian Navy: on Kalvari-class submarines.
Netherlands
Royal Netherlands Navy: on Orka-class submarine.

== See also ==
- Air-to-air missile
- List of missiles
- A-Darter – (South Africa)
- AIM-9 Sidewinder – (United States)
- AIM-120 AMRAAM – (United States)
- AIM-132 ASRAAM – (United Kingdom)
- Astra (missile) – (India)
- CAMM – (United Kingdom, Italy)
- Derby – (Israel)
- HİSAR – (Turkey)
- IRIS-T – (Germany, Italy, Sweden, Greece)
- Meteor – (France, United Kingdom, Italy, Germany, Spain, Sweden)
- PL-10 – (China)
- PL-15 – (China)
- QRSAM – (India)
- R-27 – (Soviet Union)
- R-73 – (Soviet Union)
- R-Darter – (South Africa)
- Umkhonto – (South Africa)
