= SMART-S Mk2 =

Dutch naval radar system

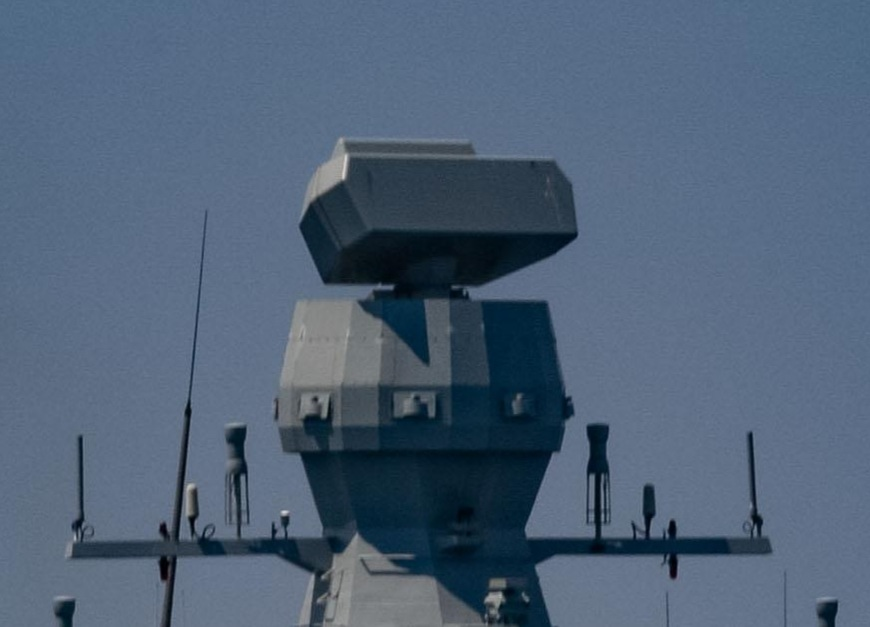
- Ada-class corvette of the Turkish Navy deployed with SMART-S Mk2 radar
- Manufacturer: Thales Nederland, ASELSAN (produced transmitter/receiver (T/R) modules, licence production or assembly of the radar)
- Introduced: March 2007
- No. built: > 65
- Type: 3D air search and track 2D surface search and track
- Frequency: E/F band (S band)
- Beamwidth: Approximately 2° horizontal
- RPM: 13,5 rpm surveillance mode, 27 rpm defence mode
- Range: Air: 250 km (maximum); Surface: 40 / 80 km
- Azimuth: 0–360°
- Elevation: 0-70°
- Power: 115V, 230V, 440V

SMART-S Mk2 (Signaal Multibeam Acquisition Radar for Tracking, S band Mk2) is a naval medium to long-range air and surface surveillance multibeam passive electronically scanned array 3D radar designed by Thales Nederland, formerly Hollandse Signaalapparaten (Signaal). While the original SMART-S radar was only produced in small numbers, SMART-S Mk2 is more successful with 30 systems were sold to navies all over the world within six years after being introduced. The radar transmitter/receiver (T/R) modules for the radar are purchased by Thales from the Turkish defence company Aselsan.

== Overview ==
The system has two operating modes: medium range up to 150 km (81 nmi) at 27 RPM and long range up to 250 km (130 nmi) at 13.5 RPM. The radar mainly designed for light frigates, corvettes and ships such as Landing Platform Docks (LPD). SMART-S Mk2 is designed to support full performance of surface to air missiles (SAM), such as the RIM-162 ESSM.

- Antenna system:
  - Number of beams formed: 12
  - Identification friend or foe (IFF) system integrated
- Maximum detection ranges:
  - Stealth missiles: 50 km (27 nmi)
  - Patrol aircraft: 200 km (110 nmi)
- Range accuracy: < 15 m (49 ft)
- Maximal numbers of tracked targets:
  - Sea+Air: 500 / 700
- Cooling: Chilled water
- Fully automatic detection and tracking of air and surface targets
- Dedicated electronic counter-countermeasure (ECCM) techniques
- Jammer detection and tracking
- Automatic Target Classification

== Users ==
- Absalon-class frigate
- Ada-class corvette (MILGEM project, license produced / assembled by ASELSAN)
- Adhafer-class corvette
- Almirante Padilla-class frigate
- Anzac-class frigate (Royal New Zealand Navy, SMART-S Mk2 as part of the ANZAC Frigate System Upgrade)
- Arialah-class offshore patrol vessel
- Babur-class corvette - MILGEM Pakistan
- Barbaros-class frigate
- Bayraktar-class tank landing ship (TCG Sancaktar (L-403))
- Brandenburg-class frigate (Mk1)
- Cassard-class frigate
- Charles de Gaulle-class aircraft carrier
- G-class frigate
- Gawron-class corvette (ORP Ślązak patrol vessel)
- Gowind-class design (Gowind 2500 Egypt, Gowind 2500 United Arab Emirates)
- Guaiquerí-class patrol boat
- Halifax-class frigate
- Karel Doorman-class frigate (Upgraded Mk1)
- Khareef-class corvette
- Martadinata-class frigate
- Oliver Hazard Perry-class frigate (Egyptian Navy)
- Sigma-class design (SIGMA 9813 & SIGMA 10513 Morocco, SIGMA 10514 LROPV/POLA Mexico)
- TCG Anadolu (L-400)

== Future users ==
- Bung Tomo-class corvette - KRI Usman Harun (359)
- Hetman Ivan Mazepa-class corvette - MILGEM Ukraine
- Maharaja Lela-class frigate - Gowind 3100 Malaysia

== See also ==
- Thales SMART-L, long range version in the SMART radar family.
