= Lazaga-class patrol vessel =

Spanish class of patrol vessels

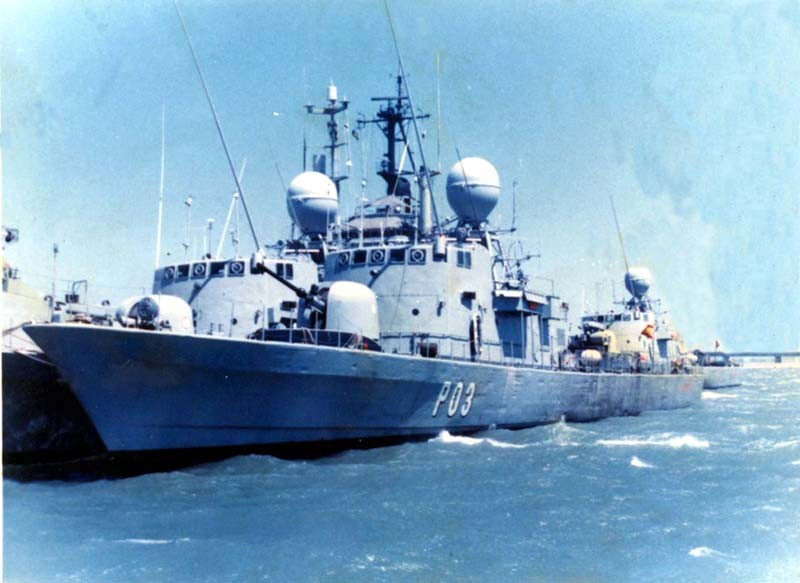
- Patrol boat Cadarso of the Spanish Navy in 1989. It was transferred to the Colombian Navy in 1997, where it was renamed ARC Jorge Enrique Márquez Durán

Class overview
- Name: Lazaga class
- Builders: Lürssen-Bremen; Bazán Shipyards (now Navantia )
- Operators: Spanish Navy; Royal Moroccan Navy; Colombian National Navy
- Built: 1974–1982
- In service: 1974–present
- Planned: 10
- Completed: 10
- Active: 4
- Retired: 6 (1 pending final disposition as of 2011)
- Scrapped: 5: 4 scrapped, 1 purposefully sunk

General characteristics
- Type: Patrol vessel
- Displacement: 303 tonnes
- Length: 57.4 m (188 ft 4 in)
- Beam: 7.6 m (24 ft 11 in)
- Draught: 2.6 m (8 ft 6 in)
- Installed power: 8,045 hp (5,999 kW)
- Speed: 31 knots (57 km/h; 36 mph)
- Range: 3,000 nmi (5,600 km; 3,500 mi) at 15 knots (28 km/h; 17 mph)
- Complement: 41
- Sensors & processing systems: Surface search: 1 Thales ZW-06 (Morocco); Navigation: 1 Raytheon (Spain); Targeting: 1 Thales WM-22.
- Armament: 1 × 76 mm (3 in)/62 Oto Melara cannon; 1 × 40 mm (1.57 in)/70 Breda-Bofors cannon; 2 × 20 mm (0.79 in) Oerlikon AA cannon

The Lazaga class is a series of midsize patrol vessels for coastal and exclusive economic zone patrol, built by the Spanish National Bazán shipyards (now Navantia) for the Spanish Navy and the Royal Moroccan Navy. Two of the Spanish units were later transferred to the Colombian Navy.

Based on the German Type 143 Albatros-class vessels, the hull of the first unit was built in Germany and the rest were built in San Fernando, Cádiz, Spain in a similar way to that of the Barceló-class patrol boat, in 1976–1977. A second batch of four units was built in 1980–1982 for the Royal Moroccan Navy, which were slightly different from the initial units in armament and navigational systems, as they included missile capability (Exocet MM-40), although that was later removed.

== Service ==
=== Spain ===
Their early retirement from the Spanish Navy prompted an inquiry in the Spanish senate about the reasons for their decommissioning; some of the reasons presented included lack of endurance and lack of a helicopter capability. It seems, however, that the navy was using the ships for roles more complex than those initially designed for. Under its initial German design, the ships were designed for fast attack by the German Navy as fast attack ships using Exocet missiles in the Baltic Sea, allowing for quick return to their bases. In Spain, that was their initial use as well, and they included a modern targeting system Signaal (now Thales) WM-22, similar to that used in the Descubierta-class corvette (WM-25) and in the Santa Maria-class frigate (WM-28). Budgetary restrictions did not allow that plan to be fully completed and they were not fitted with missile capability in the end, which left them stripped of one of their most important capabilities.

The creation of the Maritime service of the Civil Guard (Spanish: Servicio Marítimo de la Guardia Civil) only sped up their demise in the Spanish Navy, since many small and midsize boats were decommissioned from the navy as some of the coast guard functions were transferred to the new service.

Some of their systems, including the Oto Melara 76 mm/62 cannon, the diesel engines and the surface search radar were dismounted and used as spare parts for the Descubierta-class corvettes which shared those systems.

=== Morocco ===
Some of the systems, including the 76 mm/62 Oto Melara cannons, their targeting systems were ceded to the Royal Moroccan Navy. In 2008, two of the Moroccan vessels were upgraded in Cartagena, Spain, for an estimated amount of US$ 10 million

=== Colombia ===
Two of these boats were transferred to the Colombian Navy in 1997, where they served until 2009 when they were finally disposed of and sunk as part of the "Pelícano II" training exercises.

== Ships of the class ==
#	Country	Name	Commissioned	Decommissioned	Notes
1	Spain	Lazaga (P-01)	16 August 1975	30 June 1993	Scrapped
2	Spain	Alsedo (P-02)	1977	30 June 1993	Scrapped
3	Spain	Cadarso (P-03)	10 July 1976	1993	Sold to Colombian Navy
3	Colombia	ARC Jorge Enrique Márquez Durán	1997	2011	Retired and awaiting final disposition
4	Spain	Villaamil (P-04)	1977	30 July 1993	Scrapped
5	Spain	Bonifaz (P-05)	11 July 1977	30 July 1993	Scrapped
6	Spain	Recalde (P-06)	1977	30 July 1993	Sold to Colombian Navy
6	Colombia	ARC Capitán Pablo José de Porto	1997	2009	Retired and sunk as part of training exercises
7	Morocco	Commandant Al Khattabi (304)	30 July 1981		Active
8	Morocco	Commandant Boutouba (305)	11 December 1981		Active
9	Morocco	Commandant El Harty (306)	25 February 1982		Active
10	Morocco	Commandant Azouggarh (307)	2 August 1982		Active

== Bibliography ==
- Alejandro Anca Alamillo. Buques de la Armada Española del siglo XX (in Spanish). ISBN 978-84-9781-428-7.
