= OPV-64 =

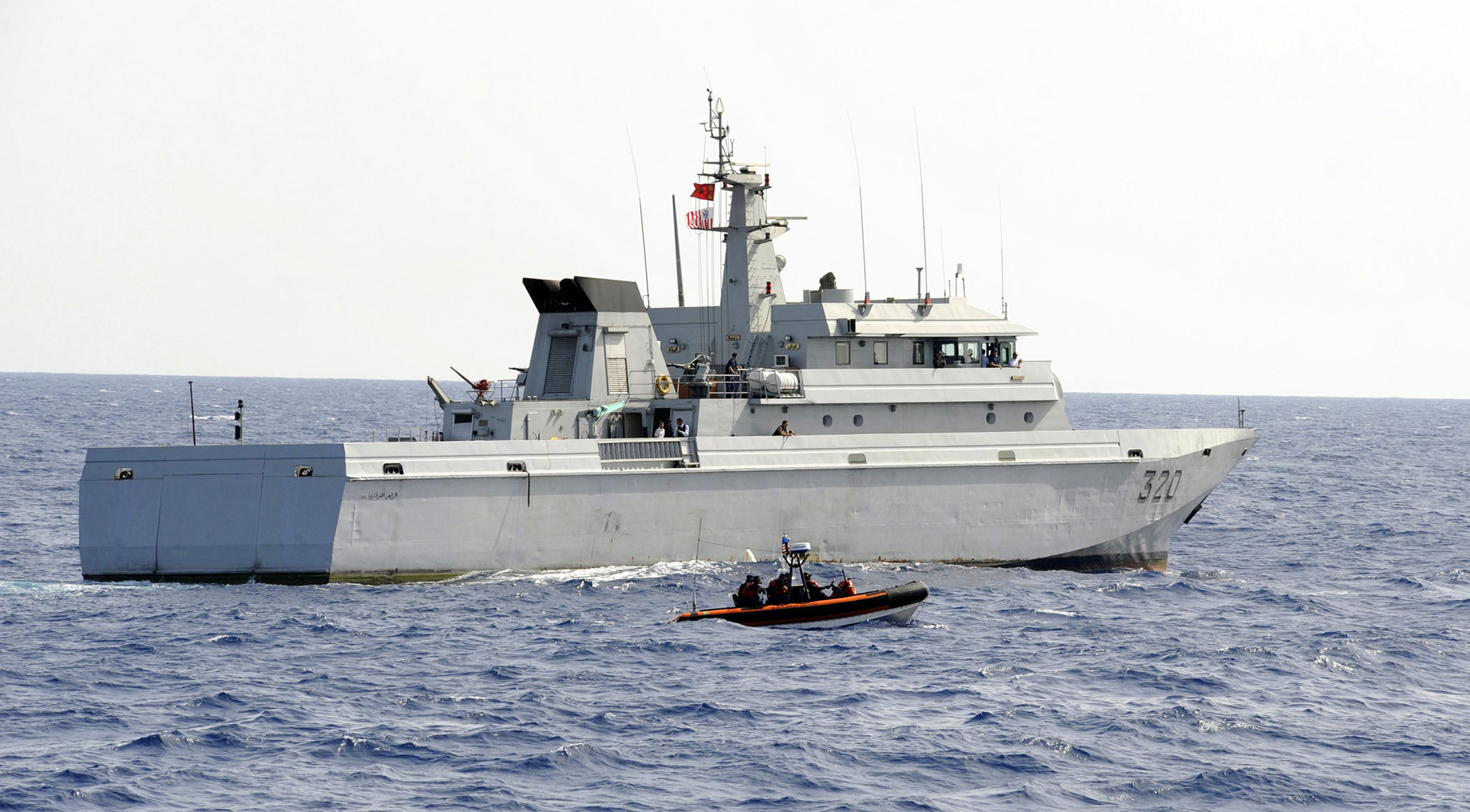
- OPV-64Royal Moroccan Navy Raïs Charkaoui OPV-64 patrol vessel.

Class overview
- Name: OPV-64
- Builders: Lorient Naval Industries; currently STX France SA
- Operators: Royal Moroccan Navy
- Built: 1994–1997
- In service: 1995–present
- Completed: 5
- Active: 5

General characteristics
- Type: Offshore patrol vessel
- Displacement: 580 t (570 long tons) or 650 t (640 long tons)
- Length: 64 m (210 ft 0 in)
- Beam: 11.42 m (37 ft 6 in)
- Draught: 3 m (9.8 ft)
- Installed power: 7.6 MW (10,200 hp)
- Propulsion: 2 Wartsila Nohab 16V25 diesel engines; 2 Leroy-Somer electric propulsors
- Speed: 25 knots (46 km/h; 29 mph) max
- Range: 4,000 nmi (7,400 km; 4,600 mi) at 12 knots (22 km/h; 14 mph)
- Endurance: maximum 20 days
- Complement: 46 (incl. 6 officers) + 8 spare berths
- Sensors & processing systems: Surface search: Decca Bridgemaster 2000; Navigation: Decca 2090 ARPA; Sonar: Commercial fathometer
- Armament: 1 × 40 mm Bofors cannon; 2 × 20 mm Oerlikon AA cannons; 2 × twin 14.5 mm guns

OPV-64 is a type of offshore patrol vessel based on a Leroux & Lotz patrol vessel concept and designed for the needs of the Royal Moroccan Navy, ordered in late 1993.

== Definition of the requirements ==
The main propulsion systems are two Wartsila Nohab 16V25 diesel engines with 7.6 MW (10,200 hp) power produced. A secondary propulsion system is fitted separately from the main engines and used for economic mode or emergencies. The main mission is the surveillance of Moroccan exclusive economic zone and control of fisheries in the Atlantic Ocean, with secondary roles including detecting illegal immigration, smuggling and drug trafficking and supporting counter terrorism and search and rescue patrols along Moroccan coasts.

== Equipment ==
The armament was recycled from decommissioned warships and from Royal Moroccan Army's inventory, later added after reception of the ships between 1995 and 1997 in Moroccan naval bases.

Original armament:

- 2 x 20 mm

Added after reception:

- 1 x Bofors 40 mm
- 4 x (2 twin) KPV 14.5 mm
- 1 x Oerlikon 20 mm

== Ships ==
Pennant no.	Name	Launched	Commissioned	Status	Note
P-318	Raïs Bargach	9 Oct 1995	14 Dec 1995	In service	
P-319	Raïs Britel	19 Mar 1996	14 May 1996	In service	
P-320	Raïs Charkaoui	26 Sep 1996	15 Dec 1996	In service	
P-321	Raïs Maaninou	7 Mar 1997	21 May 1997	In service	
P-322	Raïs Al Mounastiri	15 Oct 1997	17 Dec 1997	In service	
