= Royal Moroccan Navy =

Branch of Morocco's military

- القوات البحرية الملكية المغربية
- Flag of the Royal Moroccan Navy
- Founded: 1956
- Country: Morocco
- Type: Navy
- Size: 7,800 personnel (includes 1,500 Marines)
- Part of: Royal Moroccan Armed Forces
- Headquarters: Rabat
- Anniversaries: April 1 (foundation)
- Equipment: 121 vessels 17 aircraft

Commanders
- Commander-in-Chief: King Mohammed VI
- Inspector General of the Navy: Vice-Admiral Mostapha El Alami

Insignia
- Naval Ensign

Aircraft flown
- Helicopter: AS565 Panther

The Royal Moroccan Navy (Arabic: القوات البحرية الملكية المغربية) is a branch of the military of Morocco responsible for conducting naval operations. The Royal Moroccan Navy is administratively managed by the Administration of Defence, which is (de facto) commanded by King Mohammed VI, the commander-in-chief of the Moroccan Armed Forces.

== Mission ==
The Royal Moroccan Navy is part of the Moroccan Armed Forces. Its mission includes the protection of Moroccan territory and sovereignty, as well as the control of Morocco's 81,000-square-nautical mile Exclusive Economic Zone. Given Morocco's significant coastline (2,952 km) and strategic position overseeing the Strait of Gibraltar, it (along with Spain and the United Kingdom) is deeply involved in the security of this important international waterway.

== History ==
Although the modern Royal Navy was structured following independence, the Moroccan naval military traces its roots back to the 11th century, with the rise of the Almoravid dynasty, and its ambition for naval hegemony in the Mediterranean Sea. Admiral Abdullah Ben Meimoun is credited for being the first commander of the Almoravid dynasty organized naval forces.
With the Almohad dynasty taking over most of northern Africa, together with Al-Andalus, the Almohad dynasty navy soon became the "first fleet of the Mediterranean". At its peak, the Almohad navy's military reputation was well known, inciting Ayyubid dynasty Egypt and Saladin to seek its help in preventing Crusades expeditions.
The 16th century marked the decline of the Moroccan state and consequently the navy that served it. The capture of major coastal cities and locations by Spain and Portugal significantly affected Morocco's naval capabilities.
The history of the modern Royal Moroccan Navy began in 1960 with its foundation by King Mohammed V. The first admiral of the modern Moroccan Navy was Vice Admiral Mohammed Triki, who held the position as the Commander in Chief of the Royal Moroccan Navy for 14 years from 1991 to 2005, and devoted 46 years of service to the Moroccan Navy. Vice Admiral Triki was awarded these decorations: (from Morocco) Legion of the Order of Commander, Knight of the Order of the Throne by King Hassan II; (from France) Legion of Honor by President Jacques Chirac; (from USA) Legion of Merit by President Bill Clinton; and (from Spain) Legion of Merit.

== Ranks ==
=== Officers ===
Rank group	General/Flag/Air officers				Senior officers				Junior officers
Royal Moroccan Navy
Royal Moroccan Navy	Amiral	Vice-amiral d'escadre	Vice-amiral	Contre-amiral	Capitaine de vaisseau-major	Capitaine de vaisseau	Capitaine de frégate	Capitaine de corvette	Lieutenant de vaisseau	Enseigne de vaisseau de 1^{re} classe	Enseigne de vaisseau de 2^{e} classe

=== Enlisted ===
Rank group	Senior NCOs					Junior NCOs		Enlisted
Royal Moroccan Navy									No insignia
Royal Moroccan Navy	Maître principal	Premier maître	Maître	Second-maître de 1^{ère} classe	Second-maître de 2^{ème} classe	Quartier-maître de 1^{ère} classe	Quartier-maître de 2^{ème} classe	Matelot de 1^{ère} classe	Matelot

== Bases ==
The main bases of the Royal Moroccan Navy are located in:

- Casablanca
- Al Hoceima
- Dakhla
- Agadir
- Ksar Sghir
- Laayoune
- Tangier

== Equipment ==
=== Warships ===
Class	Photo	No.	Ship	Origin	Year Commissioned	Note
Frigates (6)
FREMM		701	Mohammed VI	France/Italy	2014	ASW version
Floréal		611	Mohammed V	France	2002	
Floréal		612	Hassan II	France	2002	
Sigma		613	Tarik Ben Ziyad	Netherlands	2011	Sigma 10513 version (Frigate)
Sigma		614	Sultan Moulay Ismail	Netherlands	2012	Sigma 9813 version (multi mission frigate)
Sigma		615	Allal Ben Abdellah	Netherlands	2012	Sigma 9813 Version (multi mission frigate)
Corvettes (1)
Descubierta	Descubierta class Lieutenant Colonel Errahmani	501	Lieutenant-Colonel Errahmani	Spain	1983	Updated in 2014
Avante 1800		506	Moulay Hassan I	Spain	2026	Updated in 2026
Missile boats (4)
Lazaga		304	El Khattabi	Spain	1981	
Lazaga		305	Commandant Boutouba	Spain	1981	
Lazaga		306	Commandant El Harty	Spain	1982	
Lazaga		307	Commandant Azouggarh	Spain	1982	
Patrol boats (18)
OPV-70	341 Bir Anzaran	341	Bir Anzaran	France	2011	4 under construction
OPV-64	322 Raïs Al Mounastiri.	318	Raïs Bargach	France	1995	
OPV-64	322 Raïs Al Mounastiri.	319	Raïs Britel	France	1996	
OPV-64	322 Raïs Al Mounastiri.	320	Raïs Charkaoui	France	1996	
OPV-64	322 Raïs Al Mounastiri.	321	Raïs Maaninou	France	1997	
OPV-64	322 Raïs Al Mounastiri.	322	Raïs Al Mounastiri	France	1997	
Osprey 55		308	El Lahiq	Denmark	1987	
Osprey 55		309	El Tawfiq	Denmark	1988	
Osprey 55		316	El Hamiss	Denmark	1990	
Osprey 55		317	El Karib	Denmark	1990	
Cormoran		310	Lieutenant De Vaisseau Rabhi	France	1988	
Cormoran		311	Errachiq		1988	
Cormoran		312	El Akid		1989	
Cormoran		313	El Maher		1989	
Cormoran		314	El Majid		1989	
Cormoran		315	El Bachir		1989	
PR-72		302	Okba	France	1976	
PR-72		303	Triki	France	1977	
Damen Interceptor 1503		1-5	TBD	Netherlands	2016	5 under construction for Coast Guard Duties, capable of 60 knots (110 km/h; 69 mph)
Fearless 36			12 Boats			

=== Amphibious and auxiliary vessels ===
Class	Photo	No.	Ship	Year commissioned	Note
Amphibious ships
BATRAL		402	Daoud Ben Aicha	1977	
BATRAL		403	Ahmed Es Sakali	1977	
BATRAL		404	Abou Abdallah El Ayachi	1978	
LCT		409	Sidi Ifni		Landing craft tank
Support ships
Hydrographic and oceanographic boat		804	Dar Al Beida	2018	Used to chart the underwater coastal area
Ad Dakhla CLS		408	Daoud Ben Aicha	1997	Cargo ship which has a displacement of 2100 tons
Hydrographic research boat		H-01	H-01	2011	Used to chart the underwater coastal area.
Damen Stan Tug 2208		A2	Al Mounkid	2015	Coastal & harbour tug
BBP		803	BBP		Submariner training ship

=== Inshore patrol vessels ===
- P-32
  - El Wacil (203)
  - El Jail (204)
  - El Mikdam (205)
  - El Khafir (206)
  - El Haris (207)
  - Essahir (208)
  - Erraid (209)
  - Erraced (210)
  - El Kaced (211)
  - Essaid (212)
- VCSM/RPB 20 (107-116)
- Rodman-101 (130-139)
- Arcor-46 (D01-D18) In Service with Moroccan Customs
- 15 Arcor-53 In Service with Moroccan Gendarmerie
- 2 Griffon 500TD hovercraft In service with Moroccan Gendarmerie
- 10 Rodman-55
- 10 Arcor-17
    - No boats of this class have been built yet. Russia has offered the sub for sale to India, but in 2005, India ordered Scorpène-class submarines instead. On 4 July 2013, Rosoboronexport announced they will offer the Amur 1650 to the Moroccan Navy if they announce a tender for new submarines.[5]

=== Aircraft ===
Aircraft	Photo	Origin	Mission	In Service	Note
Maritime patrol aircraft
Britten-Norman Defender		United Kingdom	Maritime patrol aircraft	14	Operated by the Royal Moroccan Air Force
Beech King Air		United States	Maritime patrol aircraft	4	Two more were delivered in 2020. They are all of the 350ER versions
Helicopters
Eurocopter AS565 MA		France	Naval Military utility	3	Operated by the Royal Moroccan Navy
Bell 412 MA		United States	Anti-submarine helicopter	24	24 ordered by the Royal Moroccan Navy

== Notable sailors ==
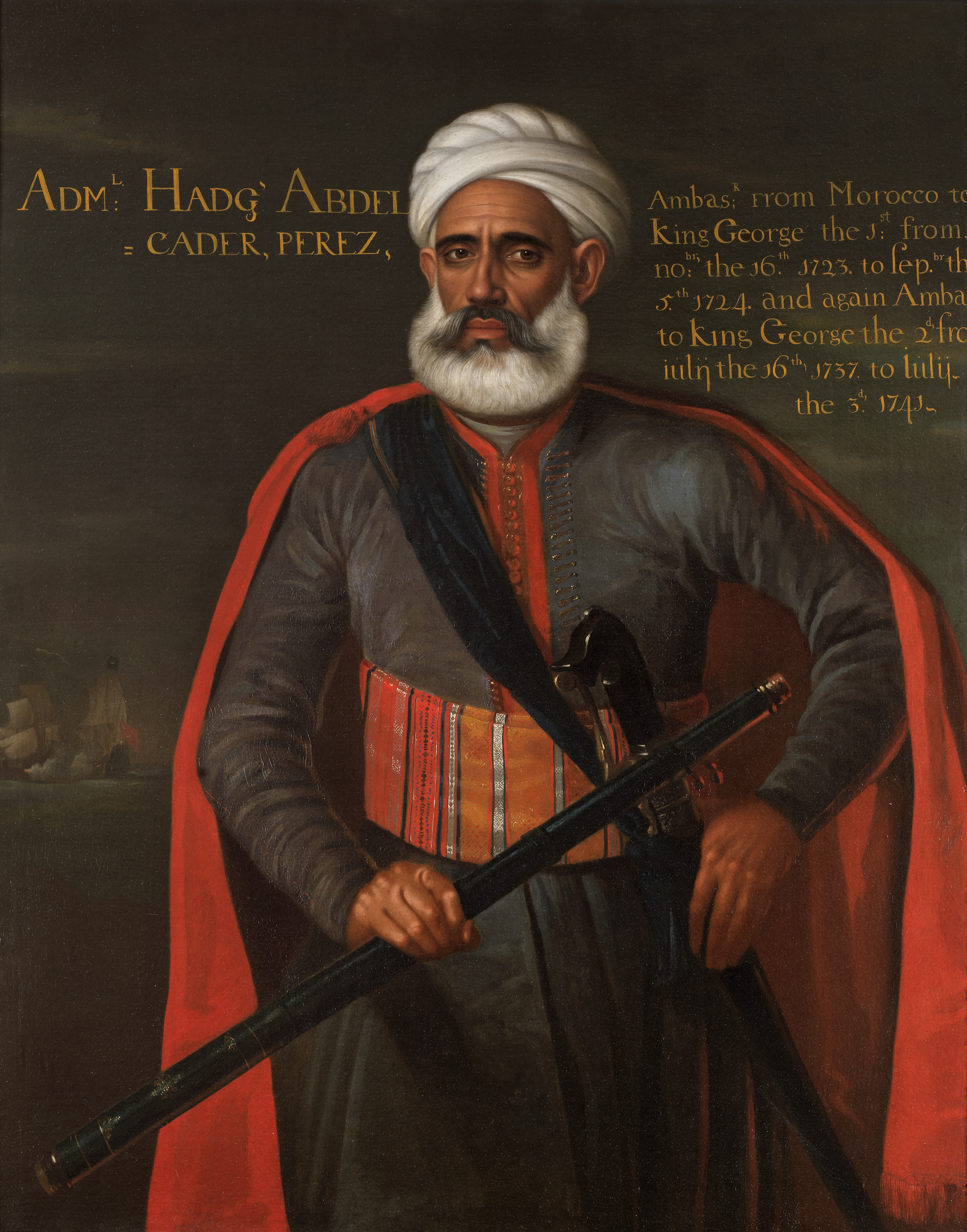
Abdelkader Perez, Admiral and an ambassador to England in 1723

- Abdellah Ben Soleïman, commander of the Almohad fleet under sultan Abd al-Mu'min.
- Abdellah Ben Taâ Allah, commander of the Almohad fleet under Muhammad al-Nasir and governor of Mallorca.
- Abdellah Ben Aïcha, admiral of Salé, ambassador to king Louis XIV of France in 1689.
- Abdelkader Perez, ambassador to England in 1723 and again in 1737.
- Corsair Triki of Salé, 17th century.
- Vice Admiral Mohammed Triki of Safi, Commander in Chief of the Royal Moroccan Navy from July 1991 to June 2005.

== Gallery ==
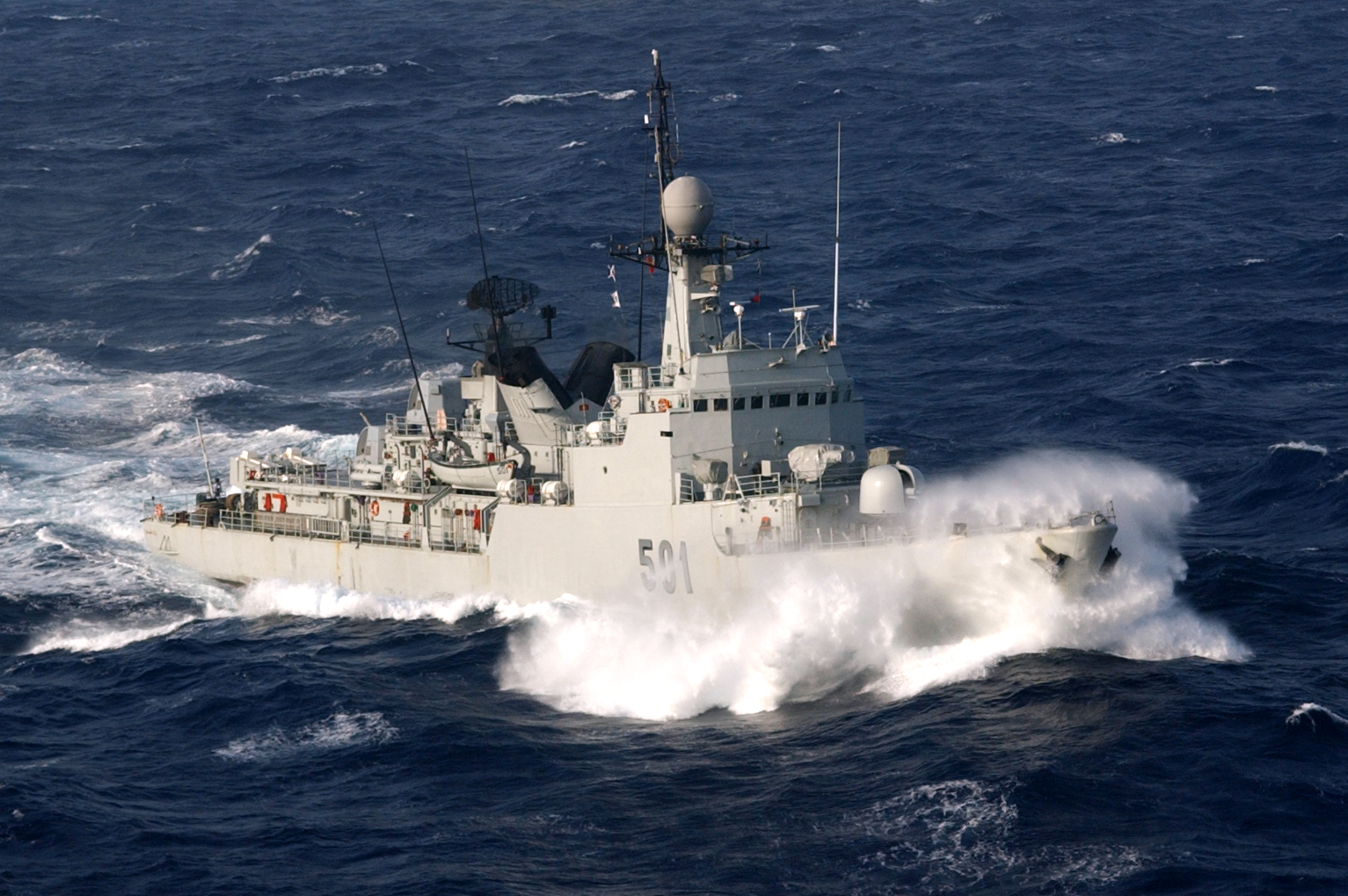
Descubierta class Lieutenant-Colonel Errahmani

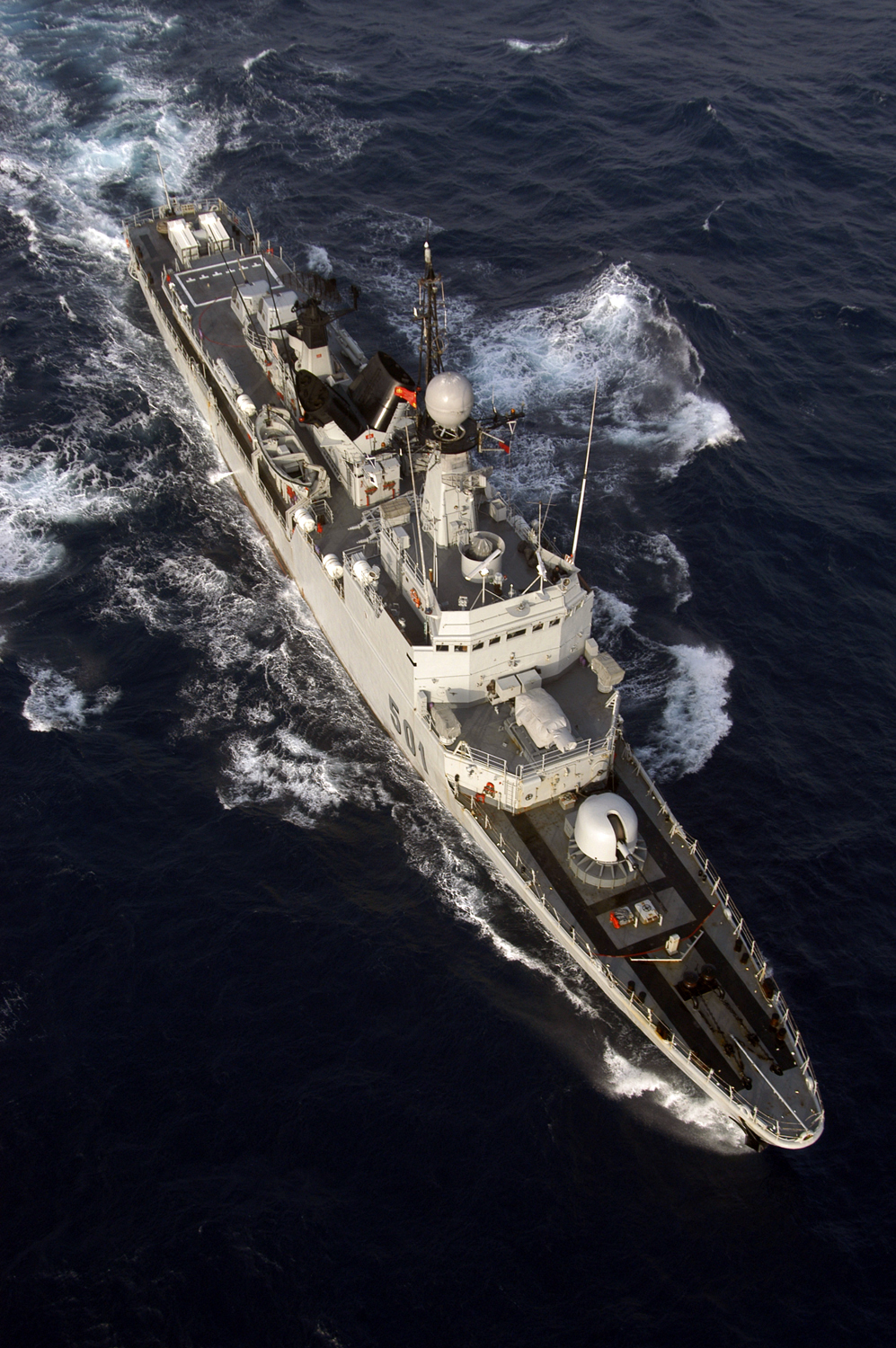
Descubierta class Lieutenant-Colonel Errahmani

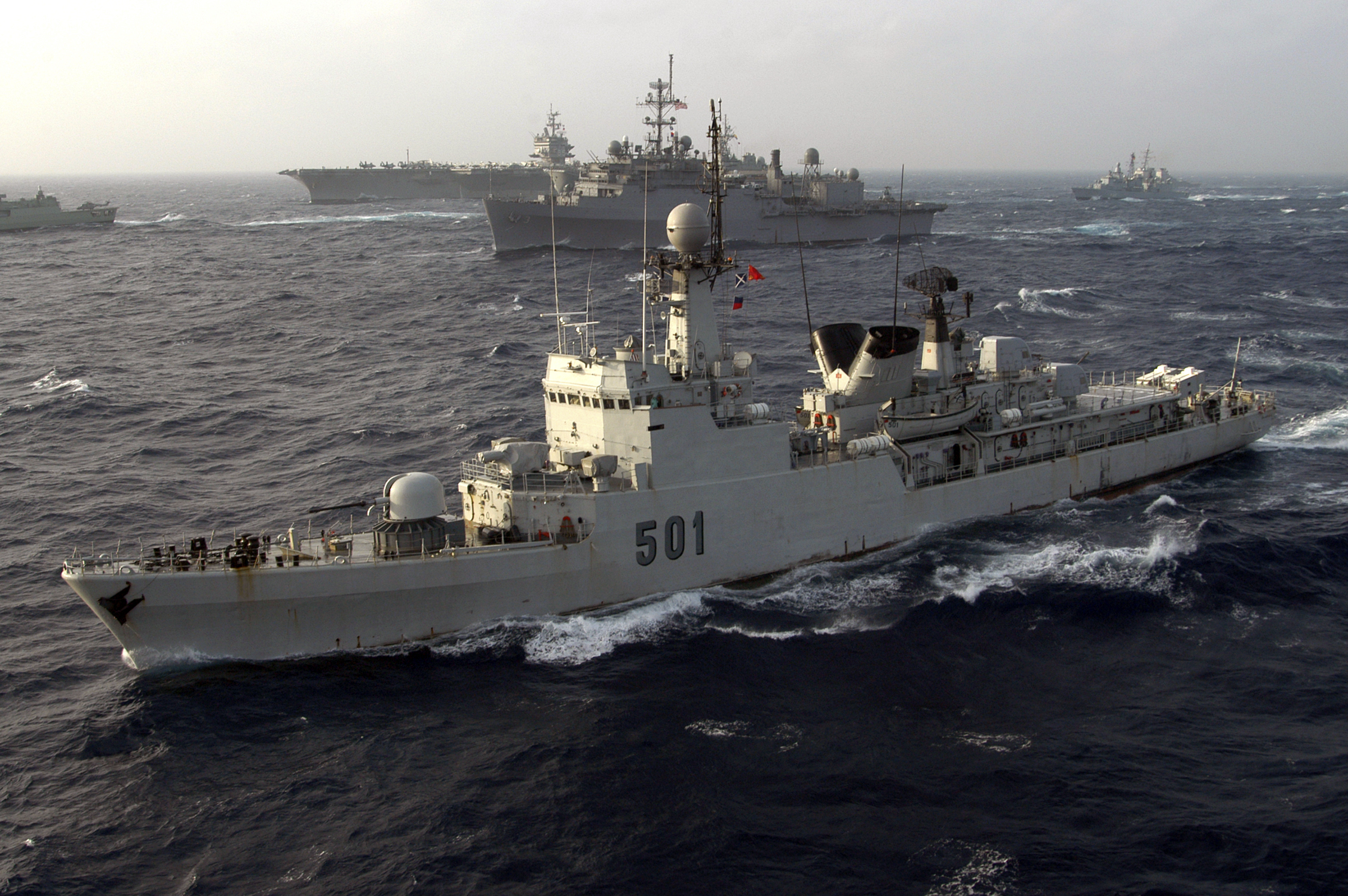
Descubierta class Lieutenant-Colonel Errahmani

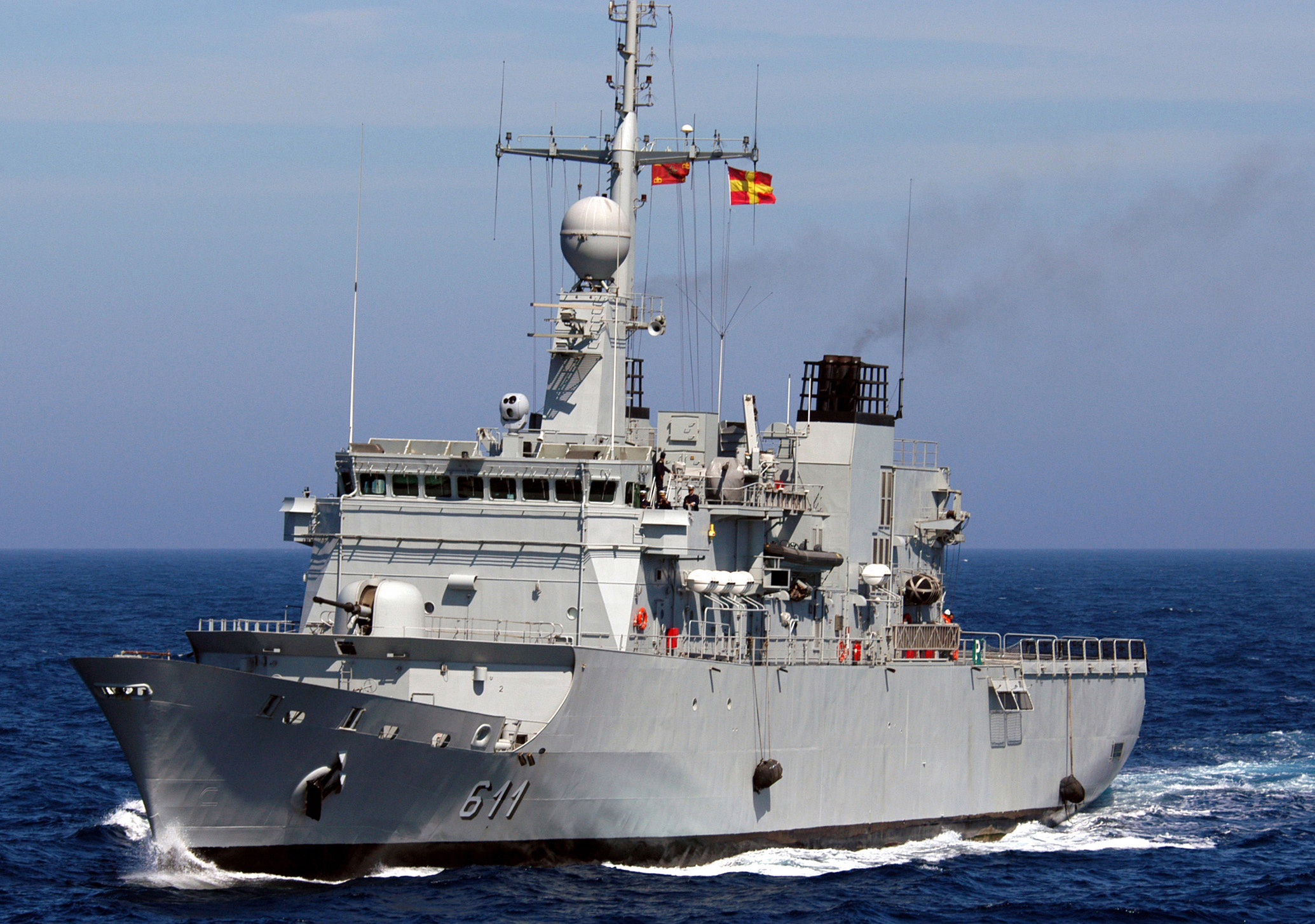
Floréal class Mohammed V

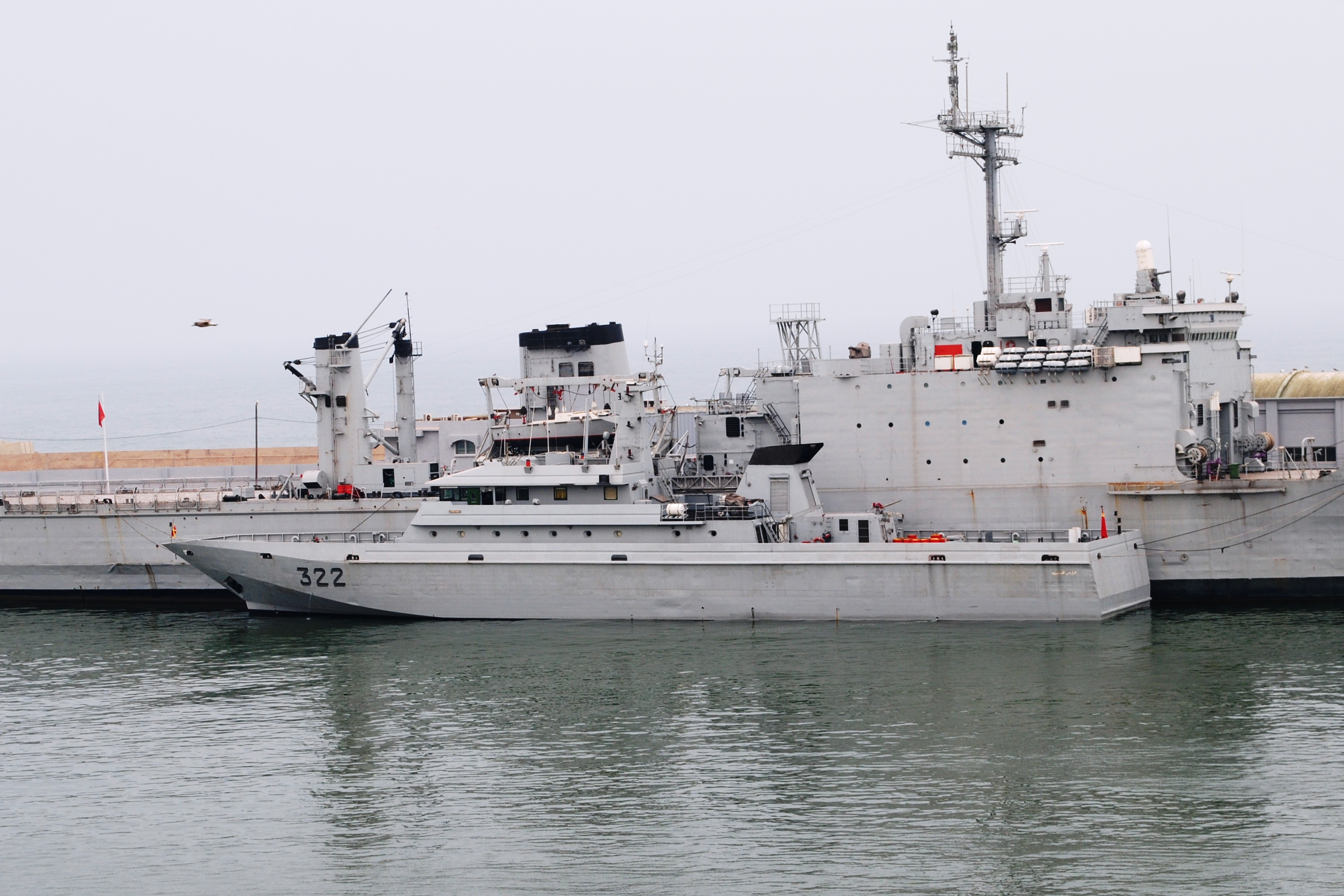
OPV-64 Raïs Al Mounastiri

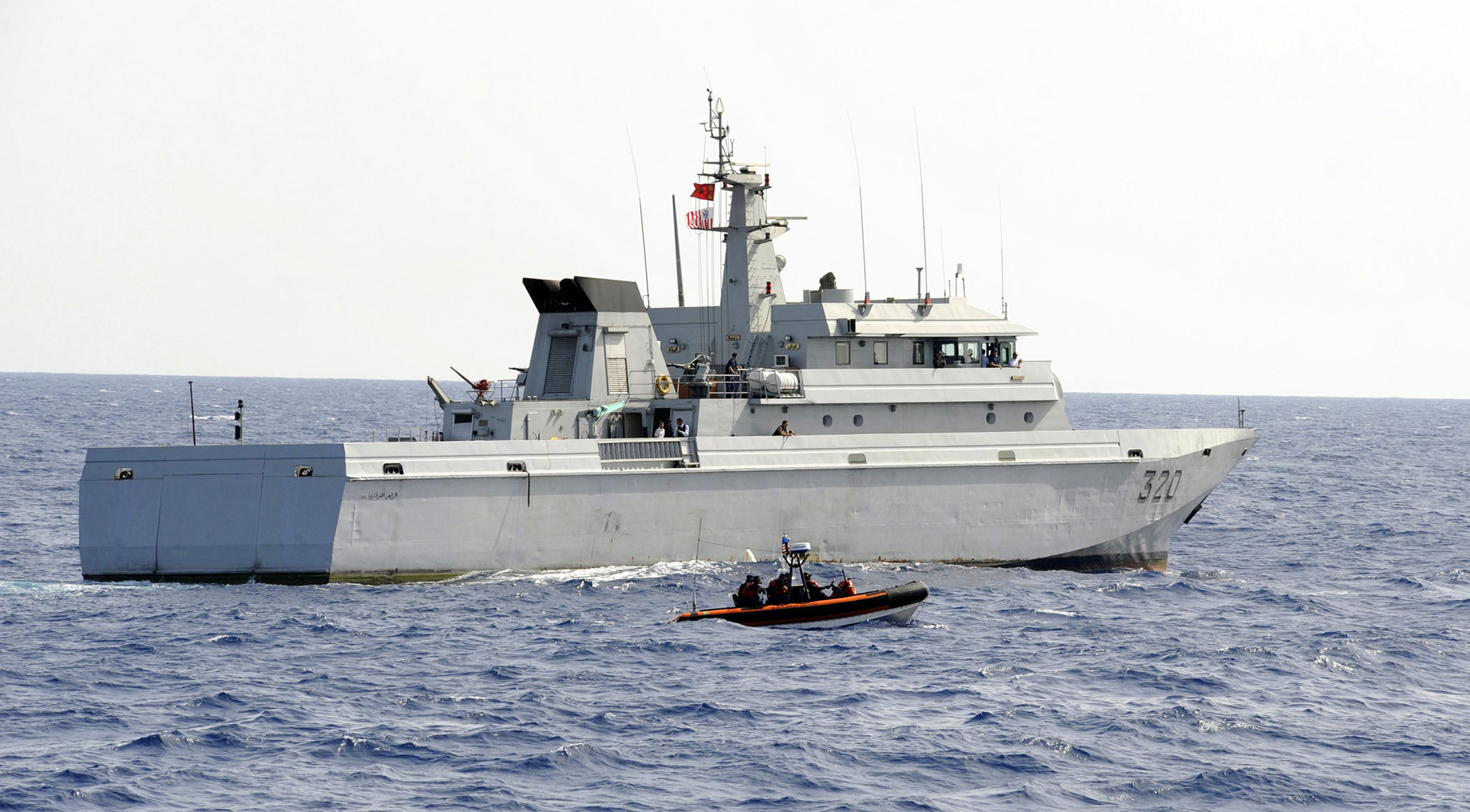
OPV-64 Rais Charkaoui

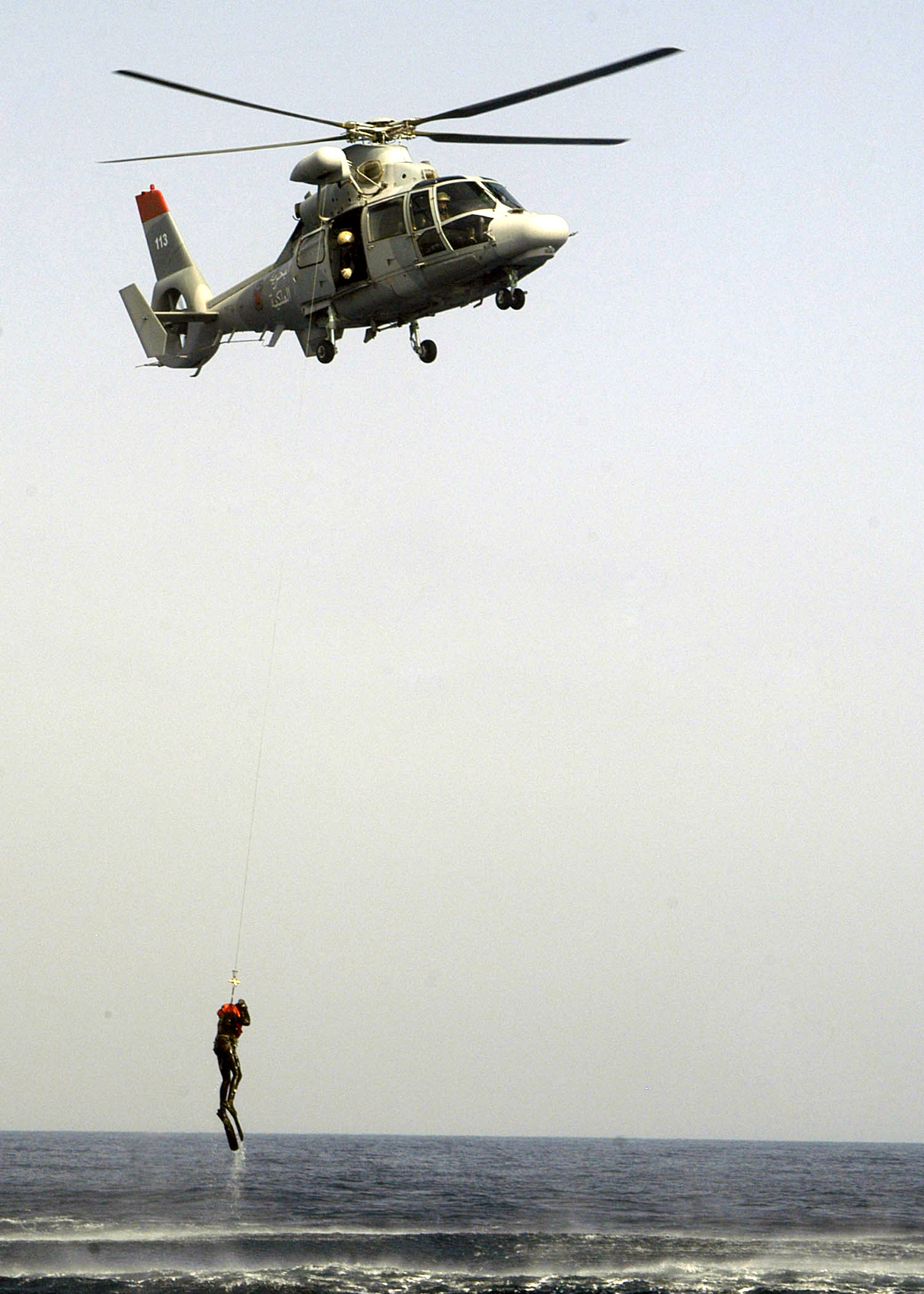
AS565 MA Panther of the RMN

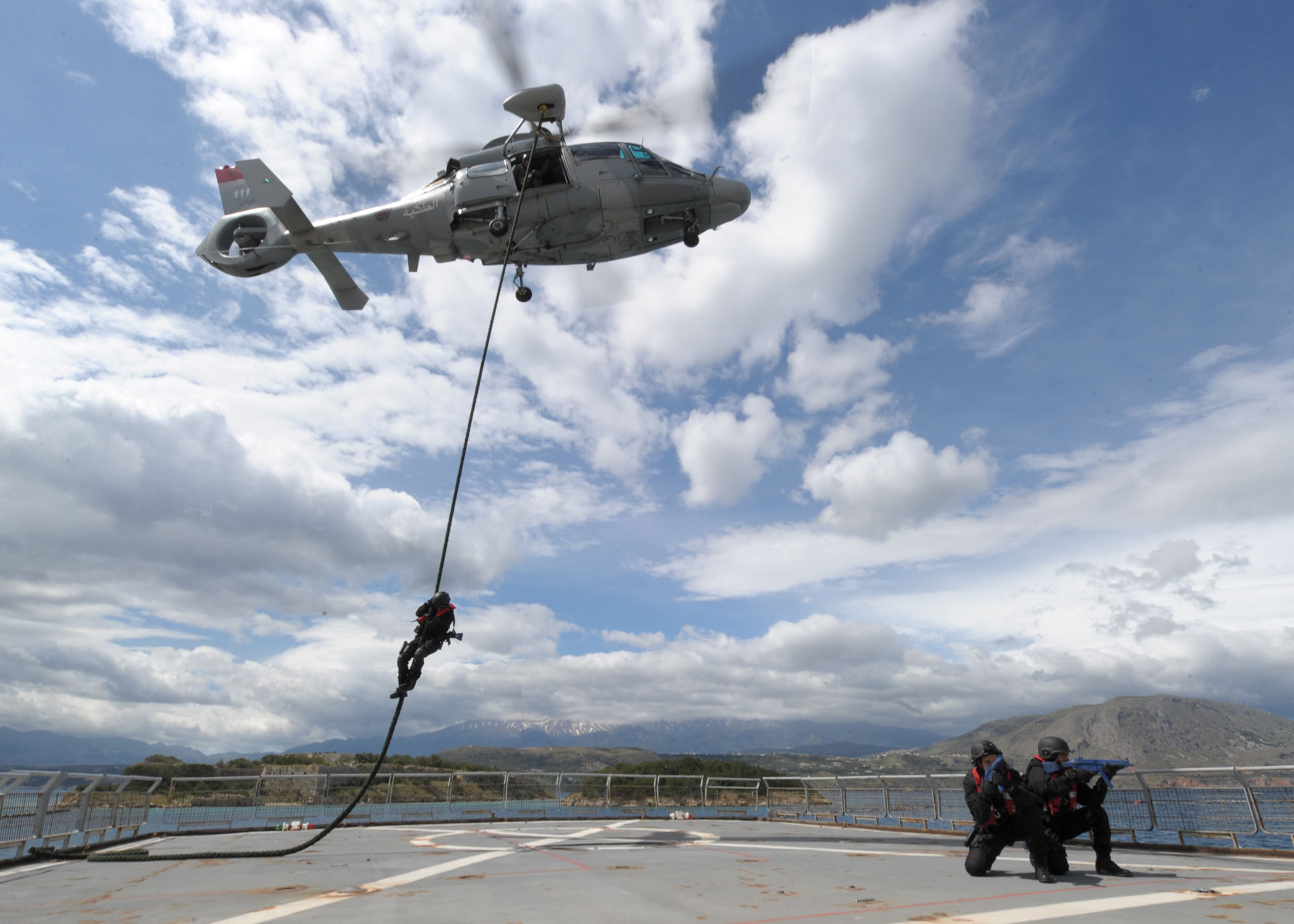
Eurocopter AS565 MA Panther of the RMN

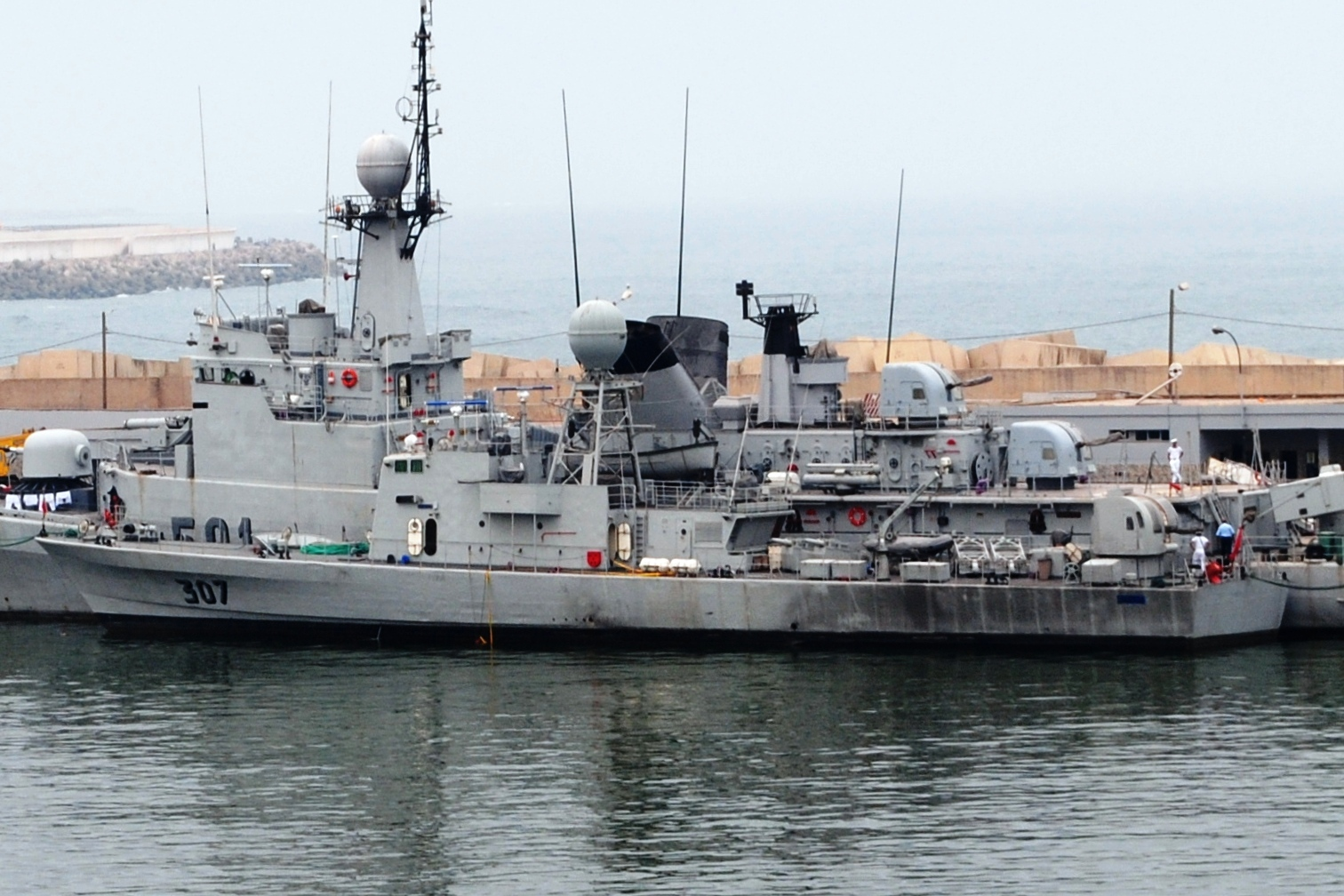
Lazaga class Commandant Azouggarh

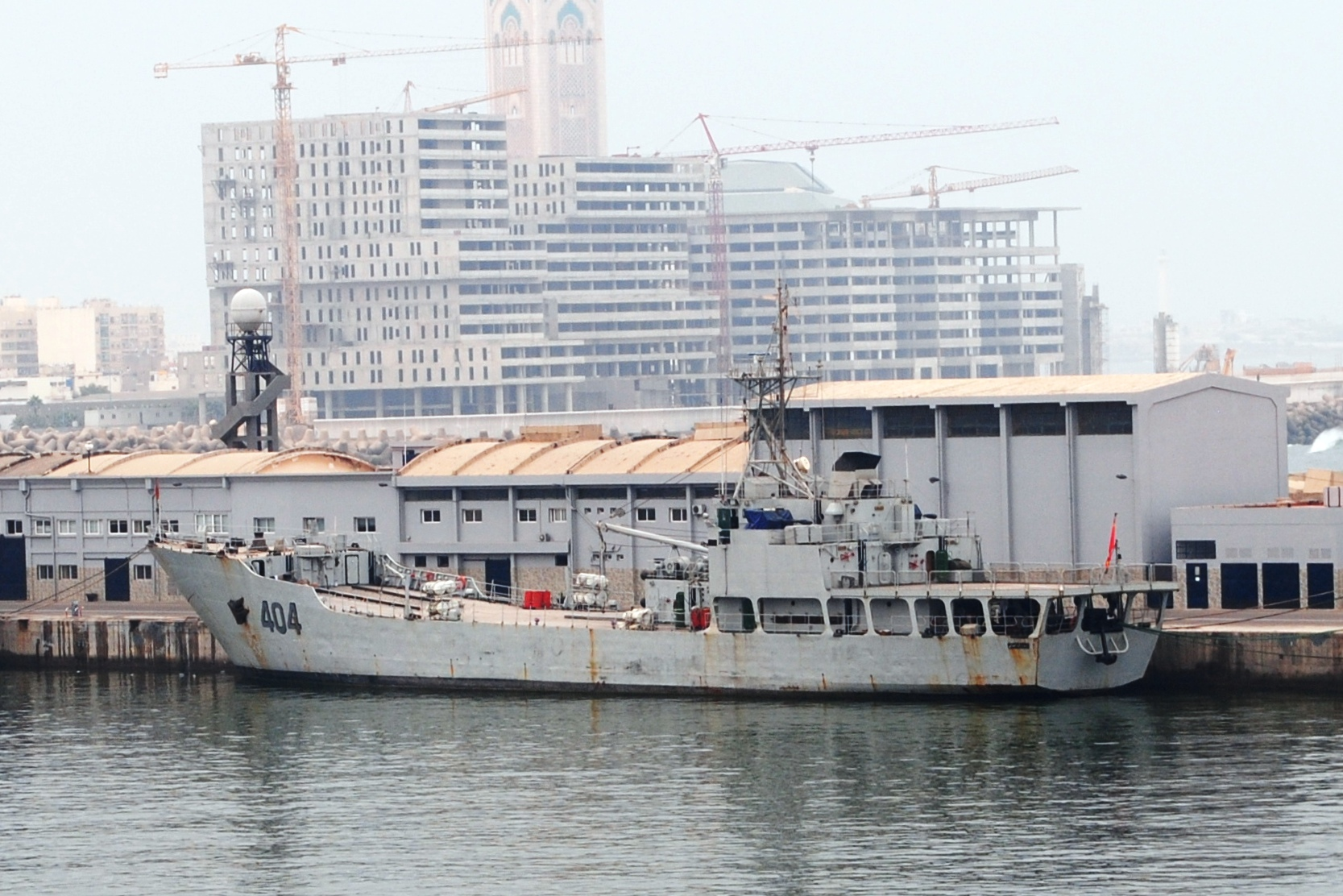
BATRAL LST Abou Abdallah El Ayachi

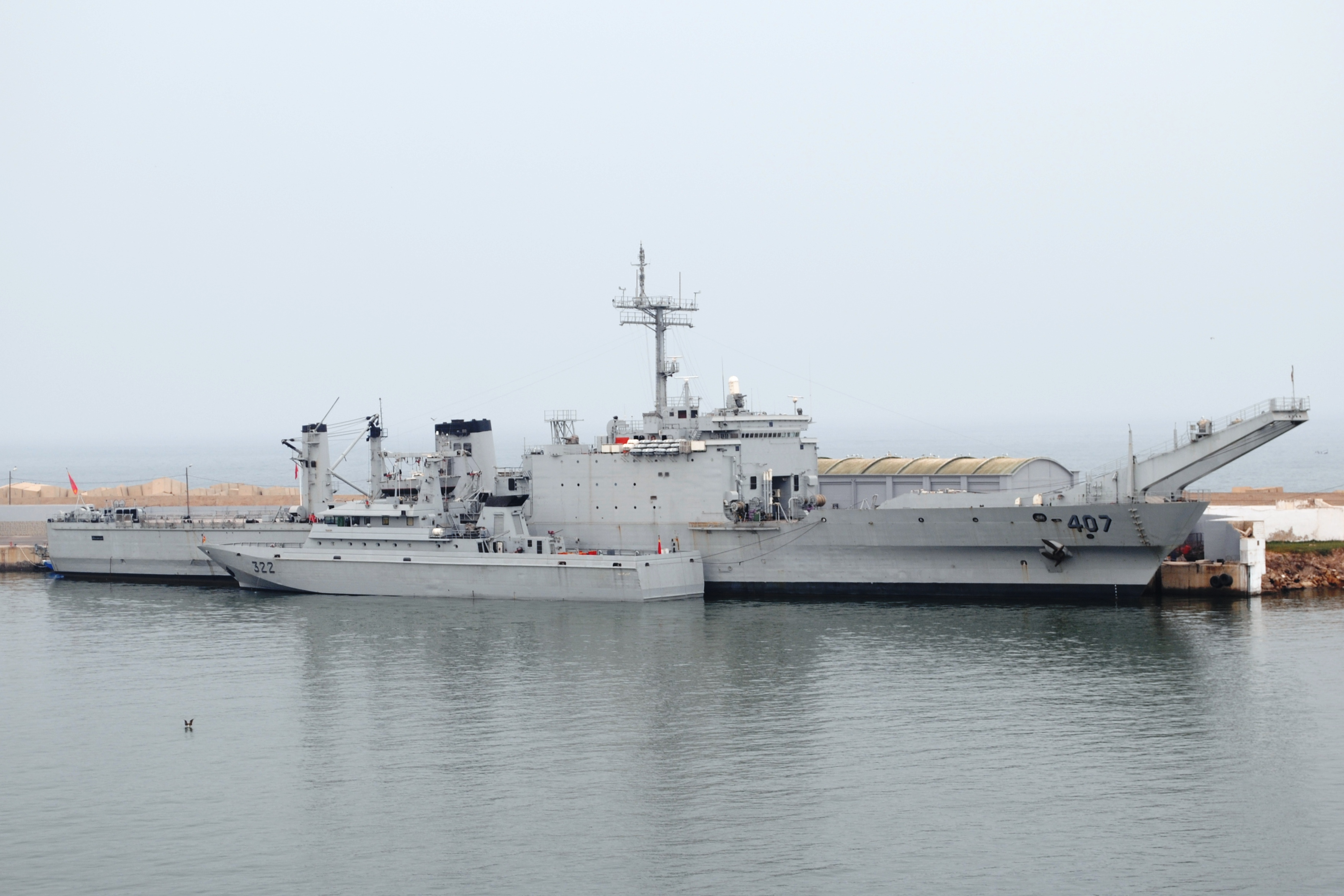
Newport class Sidi Mohammed Ben Abdallah (inactive)

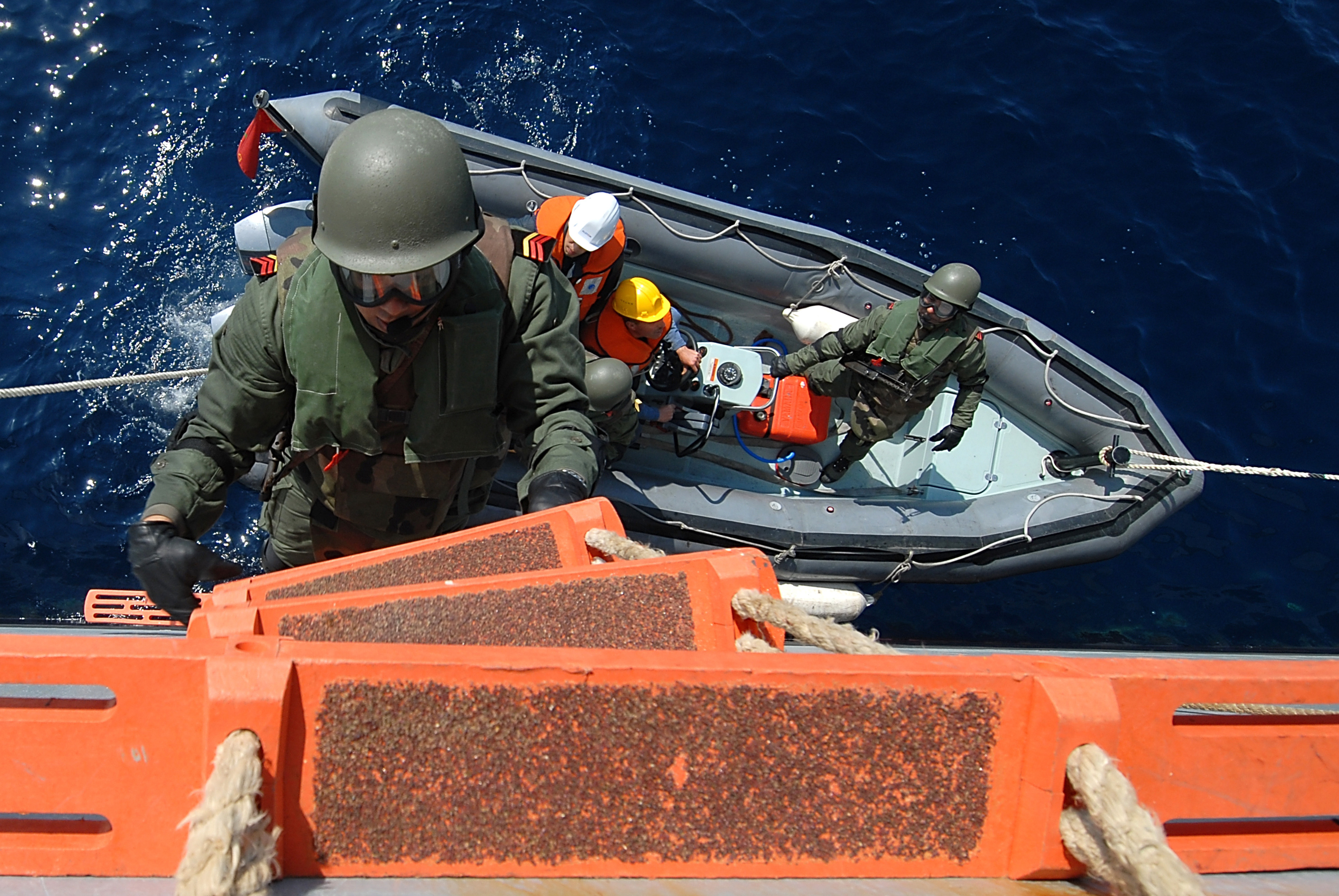
Moroccan Maritime Interdiction Operation (MIO) team during multi-national exercise Phoenix Express 2007.

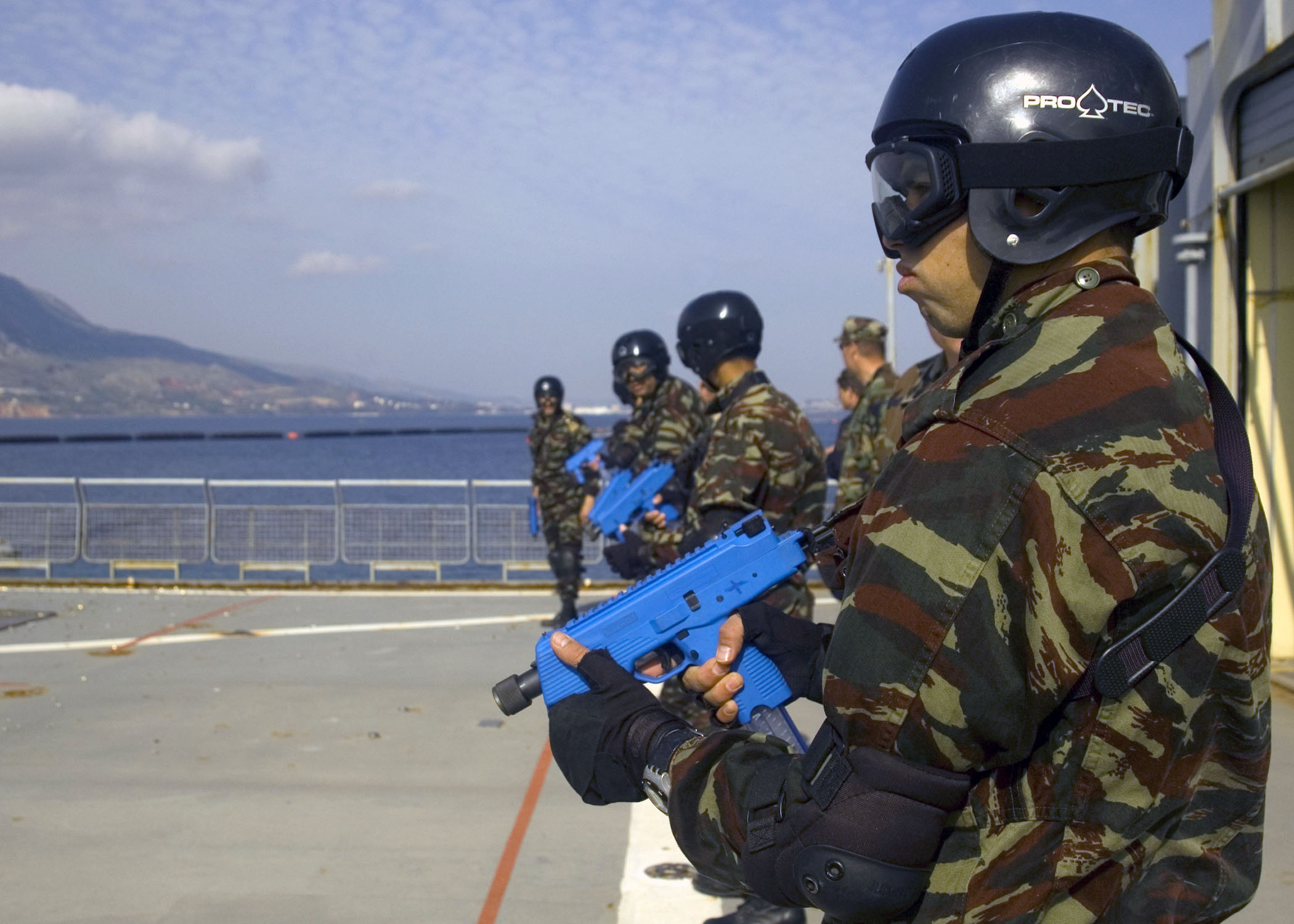
Marines from Morocco during exercise Phoenix Express 2009.

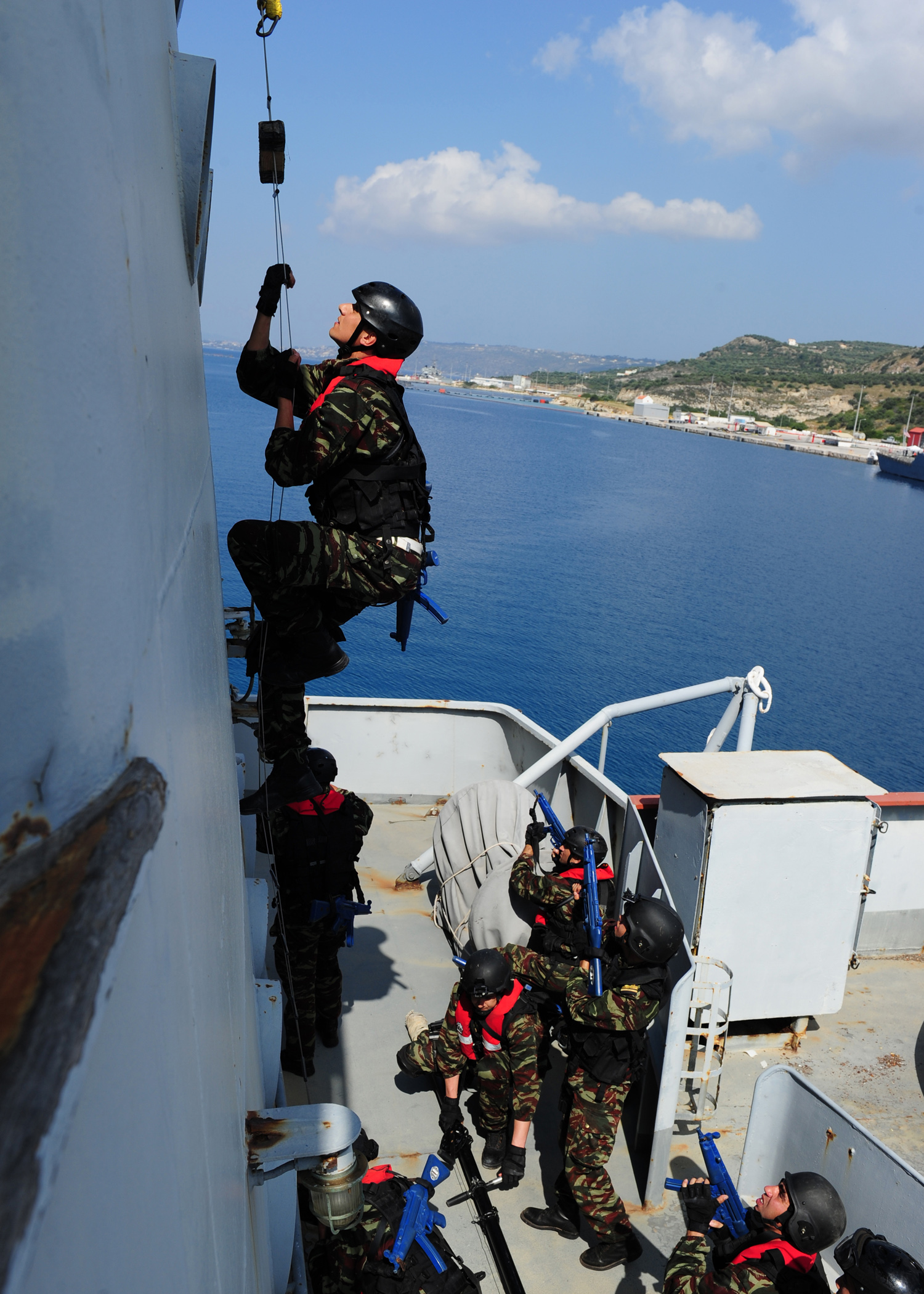
Moroccan sailors conduct boarding exercises.

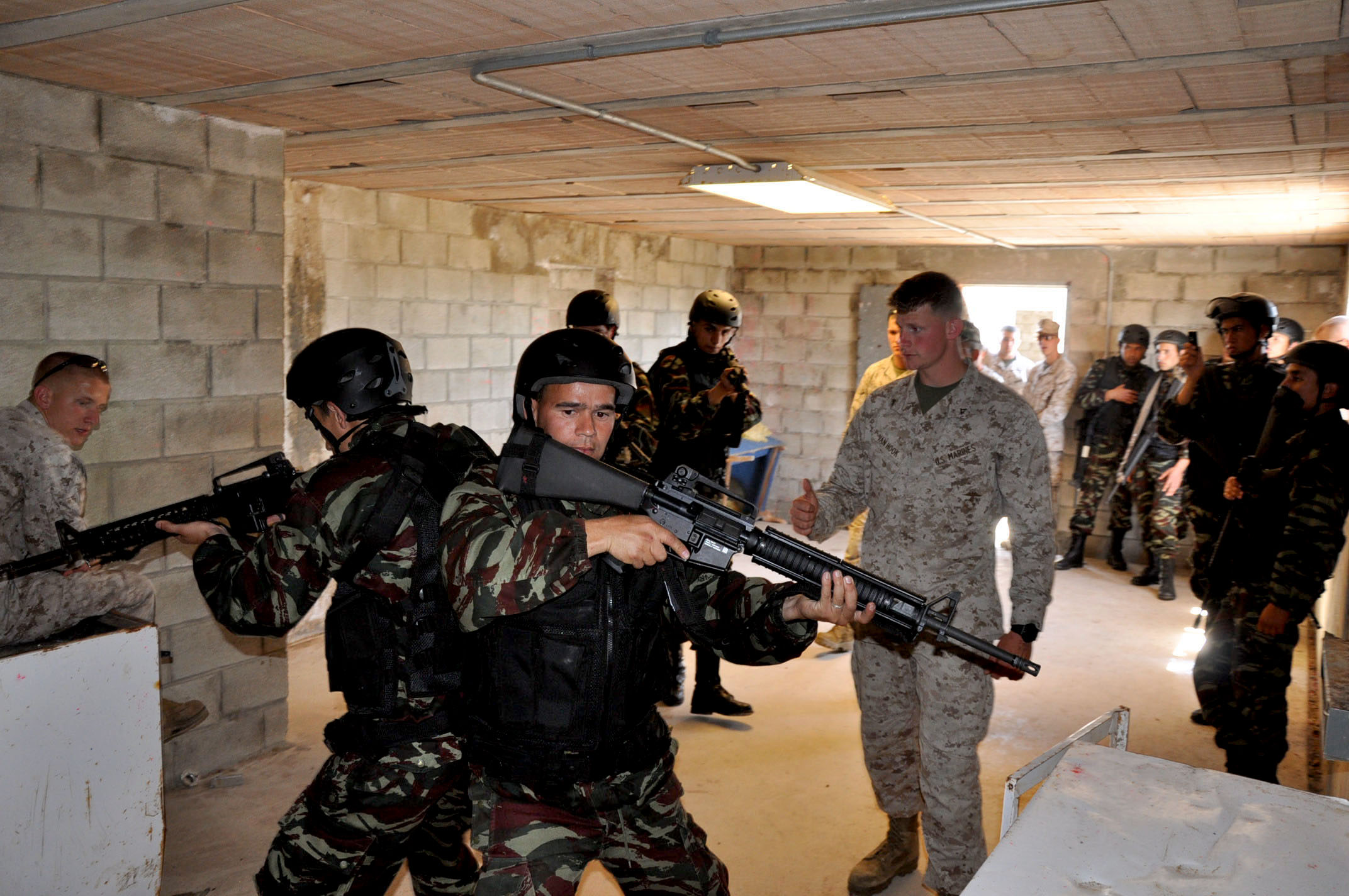
Moroccan maritime interdiction operations team on basic close quarter battle training in Exercise Phoenix Express 2010.

== See also ==
- Military of Morocco
