= OPV-70 =

Offshore patrol vessel of the Royal Moroccan Navy

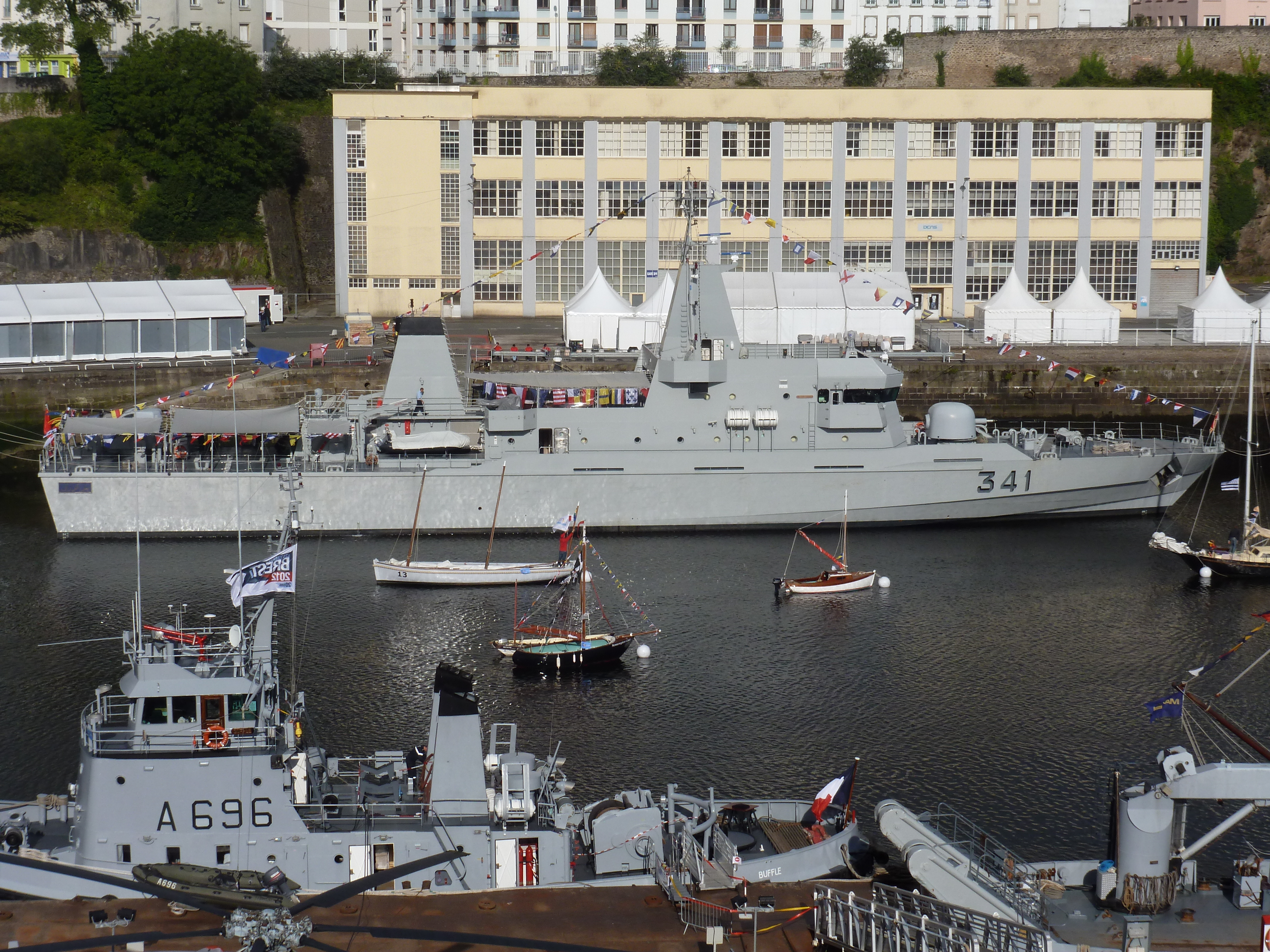
- OPV-70Royal Moroccan Navy Bir Anzaran OPV-70 patrol vessel

Class overview
- Name: OPV-70
- Builders: Raidco Marine Lorient; STX France SA
- Operators: Royal Moroccan Navy
- Built: 2008–present
- In service: 2011–present
- Planned: 4
- Completed: 1
- Active: 1

General characteristics
- Class & type: Bir Anzaran class
- Type: offshore patrol vessel
- Displacement: 800 tonnes
- Length: 70 m
- Beam: 11,3 m
- Draught: 3,25 m
- Installed power: 8.16 MW (5 500 cv)
- Propulsion: 2 x Wärtsilä 12V26 diesel engines
- Speed: 22 knots (41 km/h)
- Range: 4200 Nm (7780 km) @ 12 knots
- Endurance: 15 days
- Boats & landing craft carried: Fast intervention craft on the deck
- Complement: 64 officers; ratings 4 pax
- Sensors & processing systems: Surface search: DECCA Bridgemaster II radar
- Armament: 1 × Otobreda 76 mm; 1 × Bofors 40mm; 2 × 14,5 mm MG; 2 × 12,7 mm MG
- Aviation facilities: helicopter landing pad / no hangar

OPV-70 is an Offshore Patrol Vessel of the Royal Moroccan Navy, designed by Raidco Marine and built at STX France SA.

The first vessel received, was named after the Battle of Bir Anzaran, between the Polisario Front and Royal Armed Forces in 1979.

== Definition of the Equipment and requirements ==
The main mission is the surveillance of Moroccan EEZ and control of fisheries in the Atlantic Ocean, with secondary roles including detecting illegal immigration, smuggling and drug trafficking and supporting counter terrorism and search and rescue patrols along Moroccan coasts.

Bir Anzaran is the first in a series, which will include three more units: P342, P343 and P344 with an option for two more. The Moroccan EM (Etat Major) now discuss the purchase of a more sophisticated and advanced version for the three last ships to be built.

Its hull is made of steel and aluminum structures, for a displacement of 800 tonnes with a maximum speed of 22 knots.

It received its weapons at the port of Casablanca:

- x1 Otobreda 76 mm
- x1 Bofors 40mm
- 2 x 14,5 mm MG
- 2 x 12,7 mm MG

== Ships ==
Pennant no.	Name	Launched	Commissioned	Status
P-341	Bir Anzaran	25 Aug 2010	23 June 2011	In service
P-342				Under construction.
P-343				Under construction.
P-344				Under construction.
