= Descubierta-class corvette =

Class of Spanish Navy corvettes

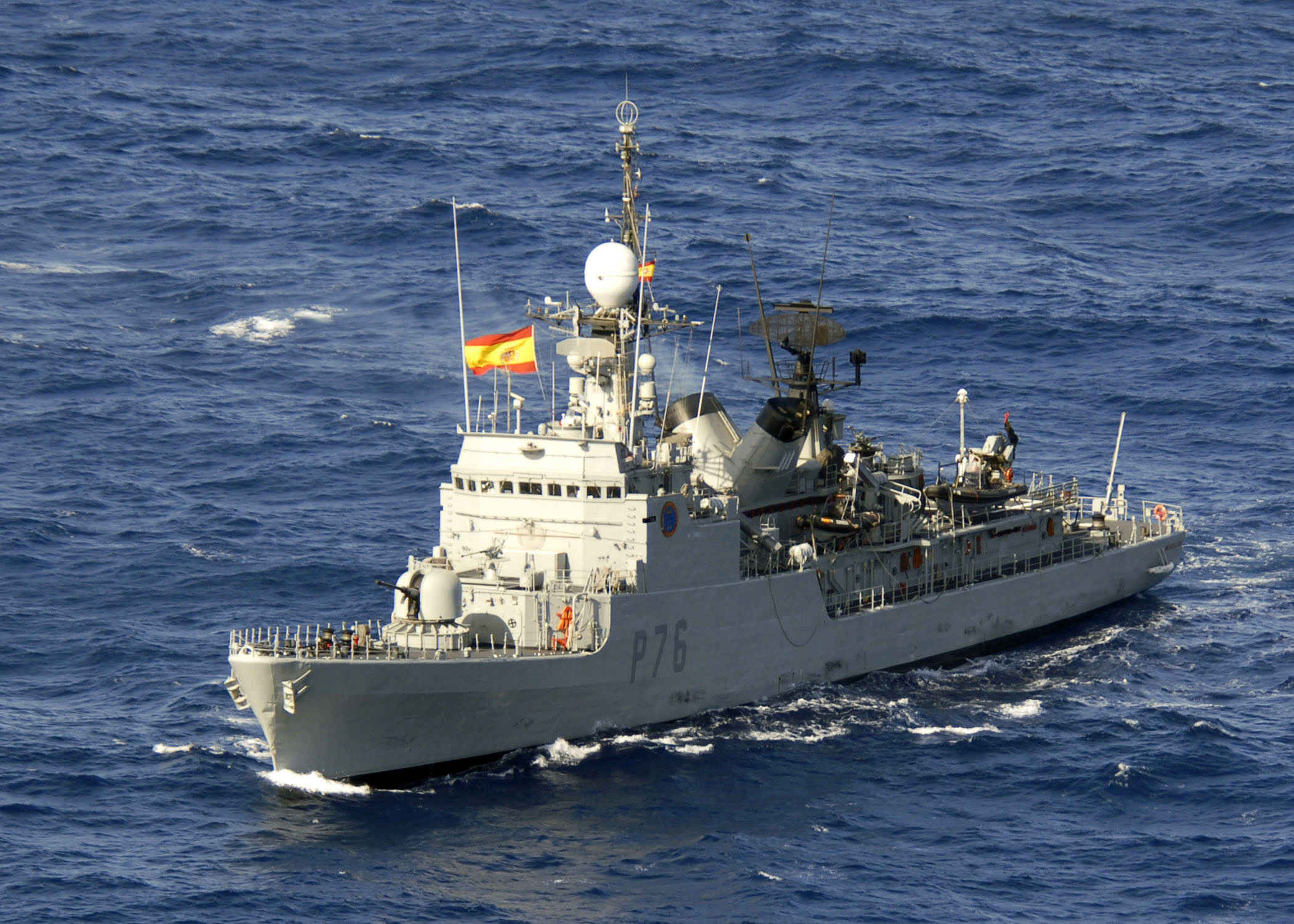
- Infanta Elena (P-76), in 2008

Class overview
- Name: Descubierta class corvette
- Builders: Arsenal de Cartagena; Arsenal de Ferrol
- Operators: Spanish Navy; Egyptian Navy; Royal Moroccan Navy
- Built: 1975-1984
- In commission: 1978 - 2023 (Spanish Navy); 1984 - now (Egyptian Navy); 1983 - now (Royal Moroccan Navy)
- Completed: 9
- Active: 3
- Retired: 6

General characteristics
- Type: Corvette
- Displacement: 1,233 tons standard, 1,482 tons full load
- Length: 88.8 m (291 ft)
- Beam: 10.4 m (34 ft)
- Draught: 3.8 m (12 ft)
- Propulsion: 2 shaft, 4 MTU-Bazán 16V 956 TB91 diesel engines, 16,000 hp (12,000 kW)
- Speed: 25 knots (46 km/h; 29 mph)
- Range: 4,000 nautical miles (7,400 km) at 18 knots (33 km/h)
- Complement: 118
- Armament: 8 - Harpoon SSM (2 × 4); 8 - Aspide SAM (1 × 8); 1 - 76 mm gun; 2 - 40 mm guns (2 × 1); 2 - Bofors 375mm Anti-submarine mortar (1 × 2); 6 - 12.75 in anti submarine torpedo tubes (2 × 3)

The Descubierta-class corvettes were a series of corvettes built for the Spanish Navy in the late 1970s and early 1980s. These ships were also sold to the Egyptian Navy and the Moroccan Navy. The ships were designed in cooperation with the German company Blohm & Voss, based on the João Coutinho-class corvettes which were designed in the late 1960s for the Portuguese Navy, by the Portuguese naval engineer Rogério de Oliveira. A larger version was proposed for a second batch but the Spanish Navy chose to build the American Oliver Hazard Perry-class frigates under licence instead.

== Ships ==
=== Spanish Navy ===
Ship	Pennant number	Builder	Commissioned	Current Status
Descubierta	F31	Cartagena	18 November 1978	Transformed to patrol craft P-75 (2000). Decommissioned 30 June 2009
Diana	F32	Cartagena	30 June 1979	Transformed to MCM support ship M-11 (2000). Decommissioned 27 May 2015
Infanta Elena	F33	Cartagena	12 April 1980	Transformed to patrol craft P-76 (2000). Decommissioned 17 March 2023 Sunk as target 2026.
Infanta Cristina	F34	Cartagena	24 November 1980	Transformed to patrol craft P-77 (2000). Decommissioned 20 March 2024
Cazadora	F35	Ferrol	2 July 1981	Transformed to patrol craft P-78 (2000). Decommissioned 26 April 2018
Vencedora	F36	Ferrol	27 March 1982	Transformed to patrol craft P-79 (2000). Decommissioned 1 January 2017

=== Egyptian Navy ===
Ship	Pennant number	Builder	Commissioned	Current Status
El Suez	F946	Bazan, Ferrol	21 August 1984	In service
Abo Qir	F941	Bazan, Ferrol	27 October 1984	In service

=== Royal Moroccan Navy ===
The Moroccan vessel is equipped with Exocet missiles instead of Harpoon missiles.

Ship	Pennant number	Builder	Commissioned	Current Status
Lieutenant Colonel Errhamani	501	Bazan, Ferrol	28 March 1983	In service

== Gallery ==
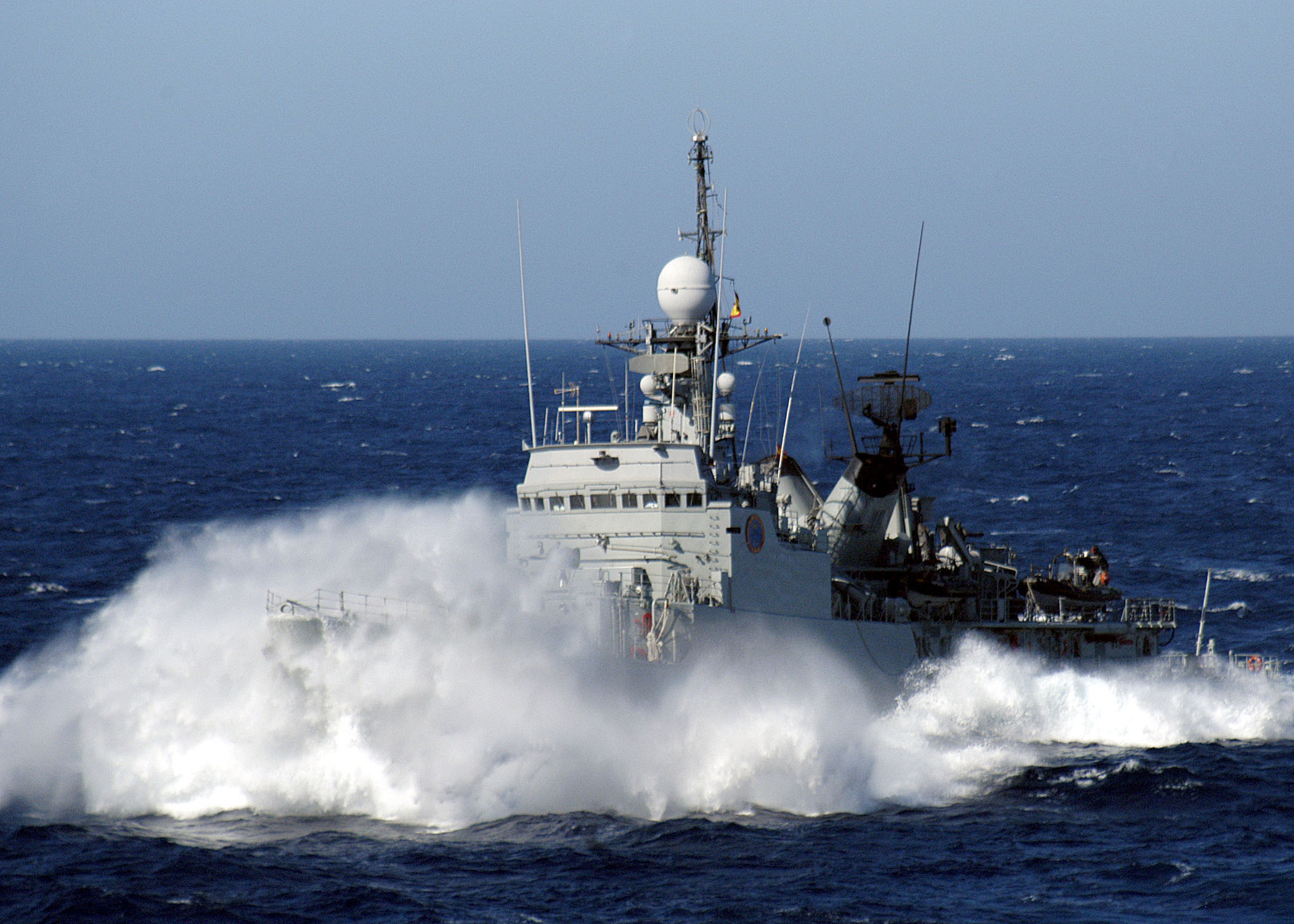
Infanta Elena (P-76), ex-F33, in 2008

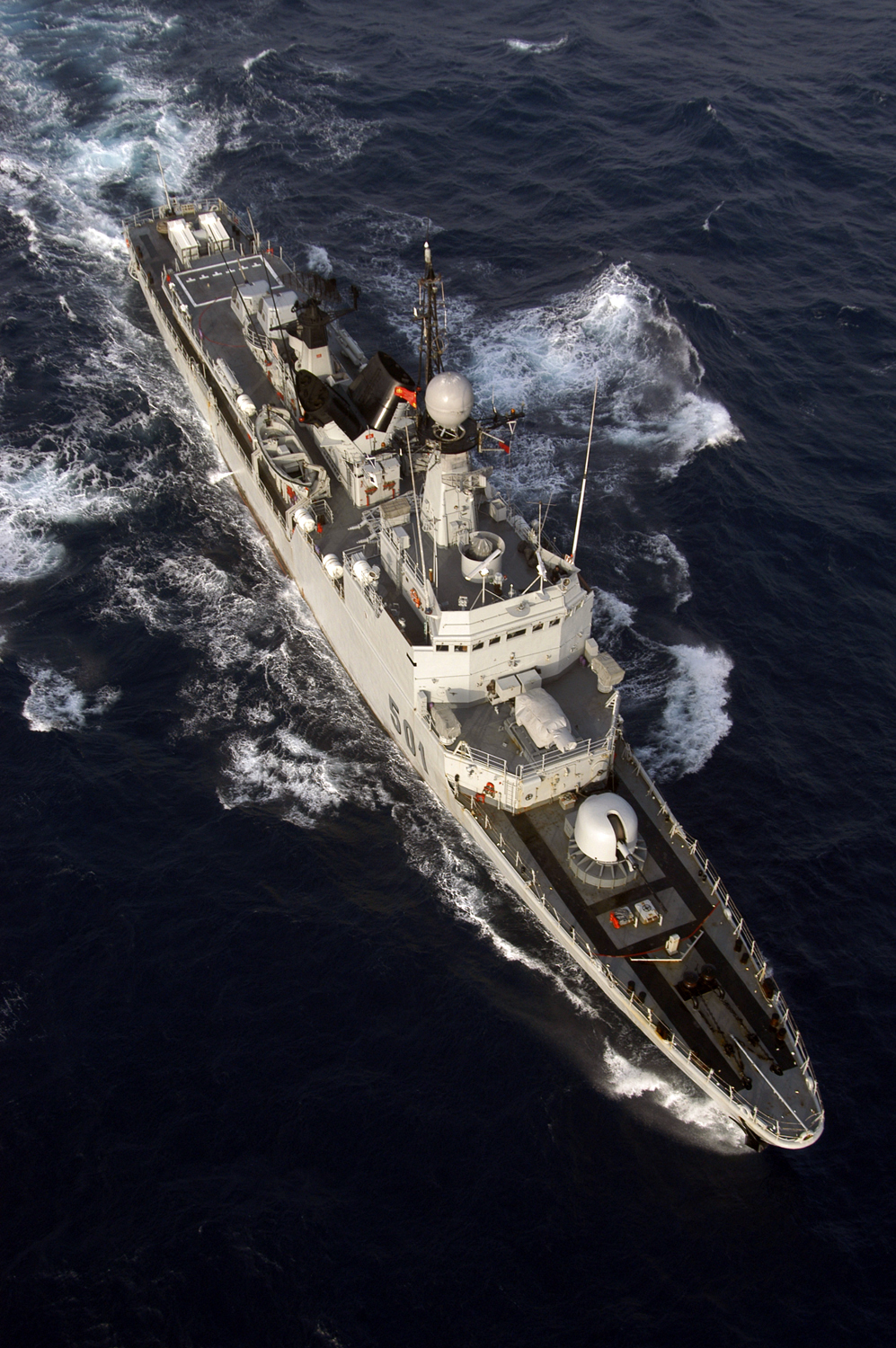
Moroccan Lieutenant Colonel Errhamani (F 501).

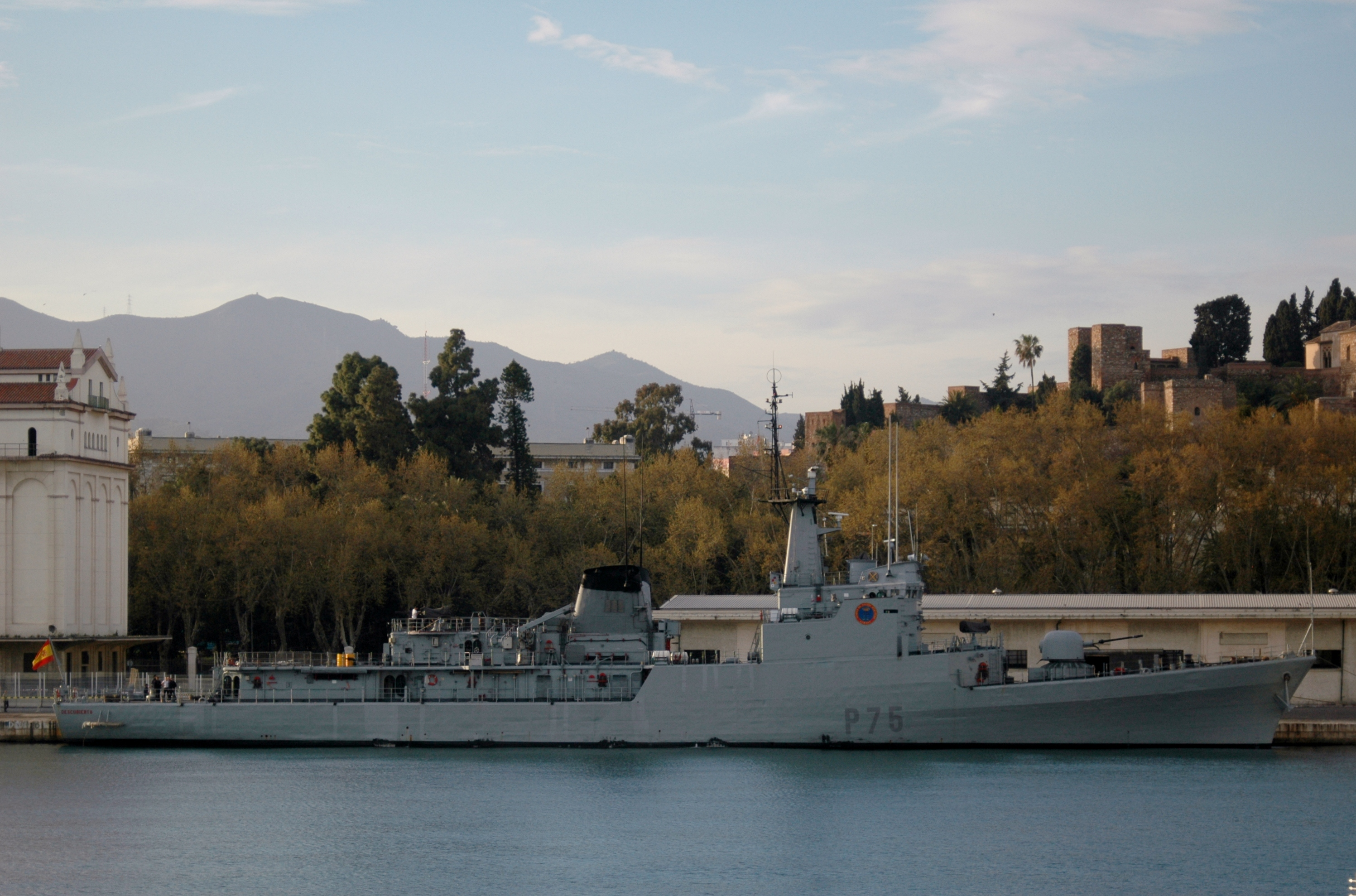
Descubierta (P-75), ex-F31

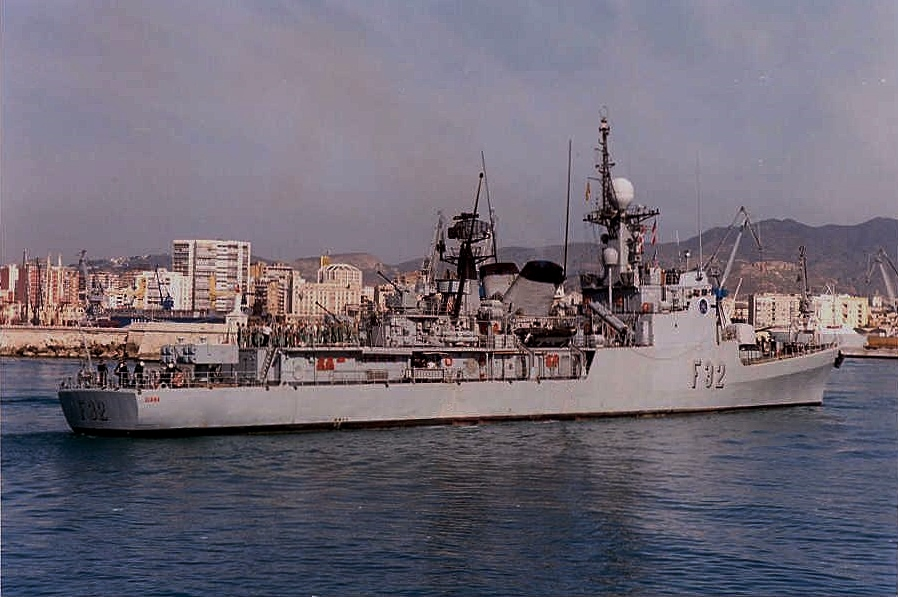
Diana (M-11), ex-F32

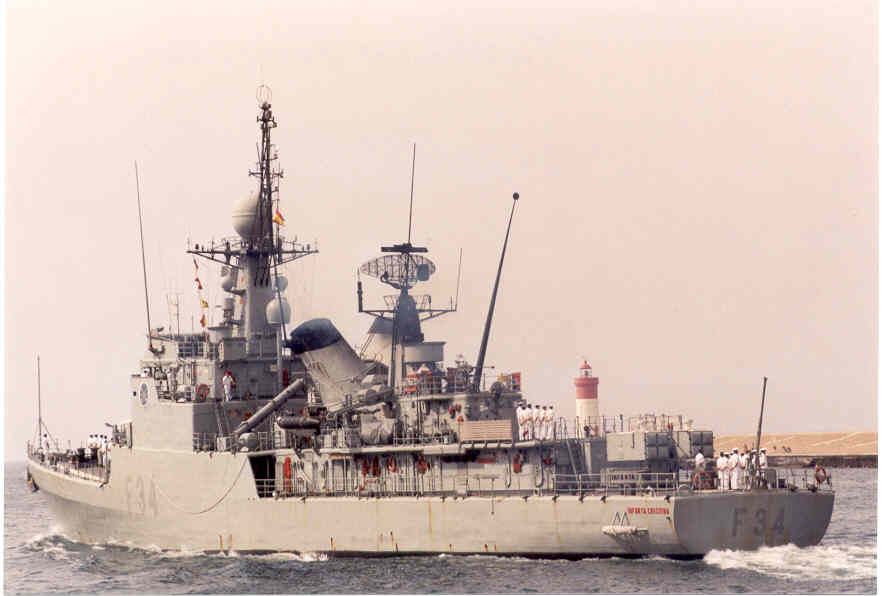
Infanta Cristina (P-77), Ex-F34

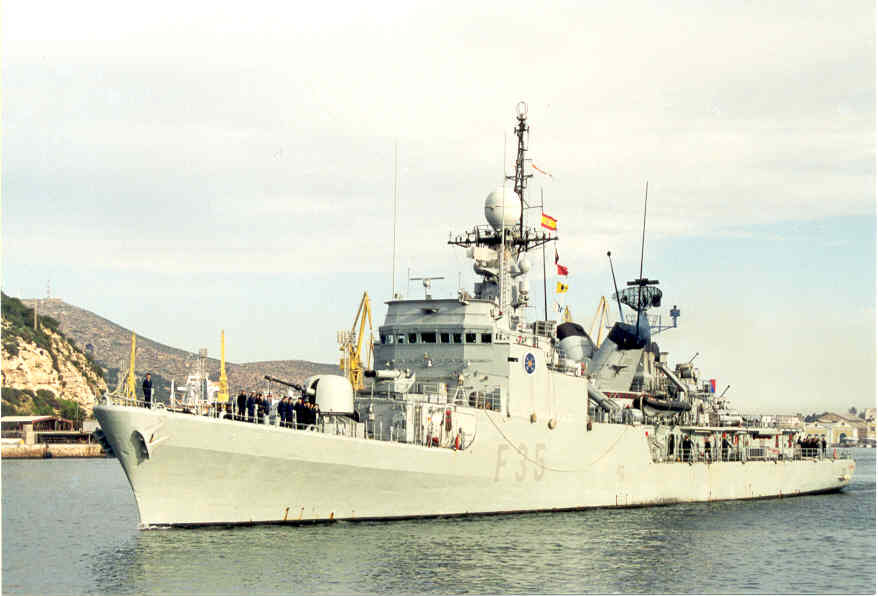
Cazadora (P-78), Ex-F35

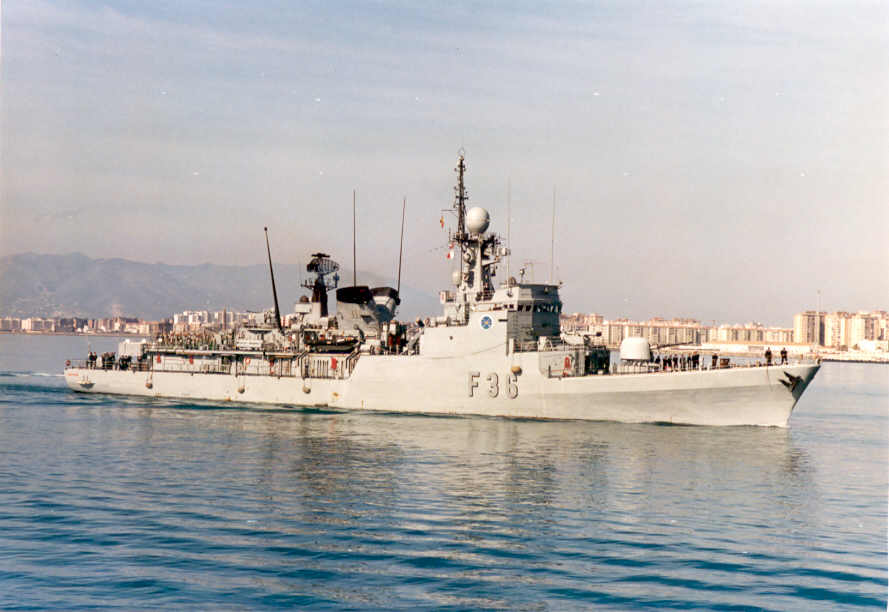
Vencedora (P-79), ex-F36

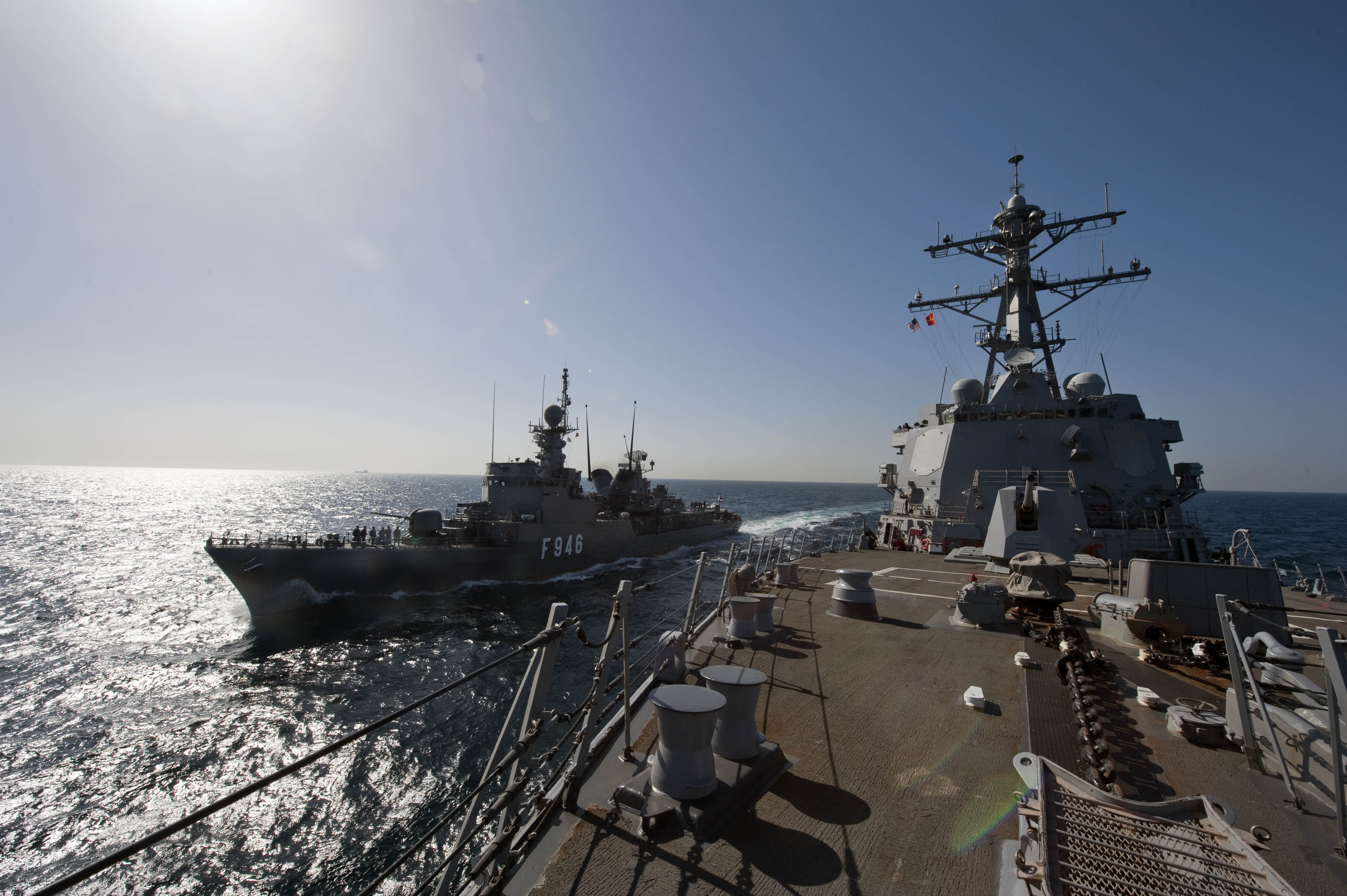
Egyptian Suez - السويس (F496) in 2012.

== See also ==
- List of naval ship classes in service
