= List of active Hellenic Navy ships =

The Hellenic Navy is the naval warfare service branch of the Armed Forces of Greece. As of 2026, the Navy operates a wide variety of warships including: 13 frigates, 8 submarines, 13 missile boats, 8 gunboats, 6 patrol boats and others.

== Current fleet ==
=== Submarine fleet ===
Class (Type)	Photo	No.	Name	Name(Greek)	Comm.	Builder	Active	Notes
Diesel–electric attack submarine (3)
Glavkos class (209/1100)		S111	HS Nireus	Νηρεύς	10 Feb 1972	(Germany) HDW	1	4 submarines of the class entered service in 1971 / 1972. The HS Nireus remains in service as of 2025, and modernised between Mar 1998 and Jan 2000 (Neptune-I MLU programme). The other submarines in class are decommissioned: Glavkos, Jun 2011.; Proteus, Sep 2022.; Triton, May 2025.
Poseidon class (209/1200)		S117	HS Amfitriti	Αμφιτρίτη	6 Sep 1979	(Germany) HDW	2	4 submarines of the class entered service in 1979 / 1980. 2 submarines remain as they were built: HS Amfitriti; HS Pontos; The other submarine in class is now decommissioned: HS Poseidon, Dec 2025; The HS Okeanos was modernised to integrate an AIP system in 2014, forming a new class.
Poseidon class (209/1200)		S119	HS Pontos	Πόντος	8 Jun 1980	(Germany) HDW	2	4 submarines of the class entered service in 1979 / 1980. 2 submarines remain as they were built: HS Amfitriti; HS Pontos; The other submarine in class is now decommissioned: HS Poseidon, Dec 2025; The HS Okeanos was modernised to integrate an AIP system in 2014, forming a new class.
Diesel–electric / AIP attack submarine (5)
Okeanos class (209/1500 AIP)		S118	HS Okeanos	Ωκεανός	8 Jun 1980	(Germany) HDW (Greece) HS Co.	1	1 of the 4 submarines of the Poseidon class that entered service in 1979 / 1980, which was modernised, and is now considered as part of the Okeanos class. It was modernised as part of the Neptune-II MLU programme, but only one of the three submarines was modernised due to a dispute with TKMS. The changes include an AIP system, the DM2A4 torpedo and the Leonardo ODLS decoy system. It re-entered service in 2014.
Papanikolis class (Type 214)		S120	HS Papanikolis	Παπανικολής	3 Nov 2010	(Germany) HDW	4	Contract for 3 submarines signed the 15 Feb 2000, the contract for an additional unit was signed in Jun 2002. The submarines that were built and are in service are: HS Papanikolis; HS Pipinos; HS Matrozos; HS Katsonis; Modernisation planned under the Achilles’ Shield programme.
Papanikolis class (Type 214)		S121	HS Pipinos	Πιπίνος	6 Oct 2014	(Germany) HDW (Greece) HS Co.	4	Contract for 3 submarines signed the 15 Feb 2000, the contract for an additional unit was signed in Jun 2002. The submarines that were built and are in service are: HS Papanikolis; HS Pipinos; HS Matrozos; HS Katsonis; Modernisation planned under the Achilles’ Shield programme.
Papanikolis class (Type 214)		S122	HS Matrozos	Ματρώζος	23 Jun 2016	(Germany) HDW (Greece) HS Co.	4	Contract for 3 submarines signed the 15 Feb 2000, the contract for an additional unit was signed in Jun 2002. The submarines that were built and are in service are: HS Papanikolis; HS Pipinos; HS Matrozos; HS Katsonis; Modernisation planned under the Achilles’ Shield programme.
Papanikolis class (Type 214)		S123	HS Katsonis	Κατσώνης	23 Jun 2016	(Germany) HDW (Greece) HS Co.	4	Contract for 3 submarines signed the 15 Feb 2000, the contract for an additional unit was signed in Jun 2002. The submarines that were built and are in service are: HS Papanikolis; HS Pipinos; HS Matrozos; HS Katsonis; Modernisation planned under the Achilles’ Shield programme.

=== Combat surface fleet ===
Class (Type)	Photo	No.	Name	Name in Greek	Builder	Active	Notes
Frigates (14)
Kimon class (Defence and intervention frigate)		F-601; F-602	HS Kimon; HS Nearchos	Κίμων; Νέαρχος	Naval Group	2 (2 on order, under construction)	First ship joined HN 15 January 2026, continuing post-acceptance trials
Hydra class (MEKO-200HN)	HS Hydra	F452; F453; F454; F455	HS Hydra; HS Spetsai; HS Psara; HS Salamis	Ύδρα; Σπέτσαι; Ψαρά; Σαλαμίς	(Germany) B.V.&Co (Greece) HS Co.	4	The first was built in Germany, the rest in Greece. 1992-1998. Modernised air defence capabilities in 2008. Under new extended Modernization as of Jan 2026 by Thales, Hellenic shipyards & SSmart.
Elli class (Kortenaer class)		F450; F451; F459; F460; F461 F462; F466	HS Elli; HS Limnos; HS Adrias; HS Aigaion; HS Navarinon; HS Kountouriotis; HS Nikiforos Fokas	Ελλη; Λήμνος; Αδρίας; Αιγαίον; Ναυαρίνον; Κουντουριώτης; Νικηφόρος Φωκάς	(Netherlands) N.K.	7	Transferred to the HN in the 1990s and early 2000s. Six ships were modernized in 2004-2009. F465 Themistoklis was de-commissioned in March 2026. F464 Kanaris was de-commissioned November 2026[1][2][3]
Missile Boats (FAC) (13)
Super Vita (Roussen class)	HS Roussen	P67; P68; P69; P70; P71; P78; P79	HS Roussen; HS Daniolos; HS Krystallidis; HS Grigoropoulos; HS Ritsos; HS Karathanasis; HS Vlahakos	Ρουσσέν; Δανιόλος; Κρυσταλλίδης; Γρηγορόπουλος; Ρίτσος; Καραθανάσης; Βλαχάκος	(Greece) Elefsis Sh.	7	2005-2021. Modernization program ongoing.
Kavaloudis class (La Combattante IIIb)	HS Simaioforos Xenos	P26; P29	HS Degiannis; HS Starakis	Ντεγιάννης; Σταράκης	(Greece) HS Co.	2	1980-1981. Modernised since 2006. P24 Kavaloudis was de-commissioned in July 2024. P27 Xenos was de-commissioned in March 2025. P28 Simitzopoulos was de-commissioned in October 2025.
Laskos class (La Combattante IIIa)	HS Blessas	P20; P21; P22; P23	HS Laskos; HS Blessas; HS Mykonios; HS Troupakis	Λάσκος; Μπλέσσας; Μυκόνιος; Τρουπάκης	(Greece) Elefsis Sh.	4	1977-1978. Modernised since 2006.
Gunboats (8)
Mahitis class (Osprey HSY-56A )		P266; P267; P268; P269	HS Mahitis; HS Nikephoros; HS Aittitos; HS Krataios	Μαχητής; Νικηφόρος; Αήττητος; Κραταιός	(Greece) HS Co.	4	2003-2005. Equipped with Spike NLOS missile launchers.
HSY-55		P57; P61	HS Kasos; HS Polemistis	Κάσος; Πολεμιστής	(Greece) HS Co.	2	1993-1994. Can be equipped with Harpoon missiles.
Osprey 55		P19	HS Navmahos	Ναυμάχος	(Greece) HS Co.	1	1991. Can be equipped with Harpoon missiles.; P18 Armatolos was de-commissioned
Asheville class		P229	HS Tolmi	Τόλμη	(United States) PB Inc.	1	Former 1969 US Navy boats, transferred to Greece in 1989. P230 Ormi was de-commissioned.
Patrol Boats (6)
Antoniou-class (Esterel-class)		Ρ286; Ρ287	HS Diopos Antoniou; HS Kelevstis Stamou	Δίοπος Αντωνίου; Κελευστής Στάμου	7 (France) Esterel	2	
Island-class		P197; P198; P288; P289	HS Mantouvalos Ioannis; HS Galanis Georgios; HS Liaskos Antonios; HS Gialopsos Ektoras	Υποκελευστής Β' Μαντούβαλος Ιωάννης; Υποκελευστής Α' Γαλάνης Γεώργιος; Υποκελευστής Β' Λιάσκος Αντώνιος; Αρχικελευστής Γιαλοψός Έκτορας	(United States) Bollinger Shipyards (Greece) Salamis Shipyards	4	Former Adak, Aquidneck, Monomoy & Wrangell. Last two ships listed were transferred to the HN in September 2023. All ships rebuilt and upgraded by Salamis Shipyards.
Special Operations Craft (15)
Mark V SOC		P62; P63; P64; P65	HS Aiolos; HS Astrapi; HS Esperos; HS Kentauros	Αίολος; Αστραπή; Έσπερος; Κένταυρος	(United States) VT Halter Marine Inc.	4	Entered service April, 2020. Equipped with Spike ER2 missiles.
Okyalos SOC		Ρ51	Okyalos ΙΙ	Ωκύαλος ΙΙ	(Greece) HS Co.	1	
Agenor SOC		-	Agenor	Αγήνωρ	(Greece) HS Co.	1	Entered service in 2021.
SuperTermoli (ST) 60		-	SOC-11	ΣΑΠ-11	(Greece) Super Termoli	1	Entered service in 2021.
RIB NSW		-	-	-	United States Marine Inc.	4	Entered service in 2022. Used by the Underwater Demolition Command.
VICTA		-	-	-	(United Kingdom) SubSeaCraft Ltd.	4	Four will be used by the Underwater Demolition Command, another six will be used by the Army Special Forces. Contract signed July 2026, first ships delivered by October 2026.
General Support Ships (6)
Etna class		A374	HS Prometheus	Προμηθεύς	(Greece) Elefsis Sh.	1	2004.
Lüneburg class		A470	HS Aliakmon	Αλιάκμων	(Germany) B.V.&Co	1	Former 1968 German Navy boats, transferred to Greece in 1993-94. A464 Axios was de-commissioned June 2022.
Atlas class		A471; A472; A473	HS Atlas I HS Heracles; HS Aias	Άτλας I Ηρακλής; Αίας	(Norway) Simon Møkster Shipping	3	Donated to HN in 2019, 2020 and 2021 respectively.
Viking Vision		Α377	HS Perseus I	Περσεύς I	(Spain) Naval Gijon	1	Platform supply vessel (PSV) built in 1993. Repurposed in 2007 to a Research/Survey Vessel. Donated to the HN in 2023.
Tankers (10)
Water Tankers		A433; A434; A467; A468	HS Kerkini; HS Prespa; HS Doirani; HS Kallirhoe	Κερκίνη; Πρέσπα; Δοϊράνη; Καλλιρόη	(Greece) Chalkis Shipyards	4	
Oil Tankers		A375 A376 A416 A417 A466 A469	HS Zeus HS Orion HS Ouranos HS Hyperion HS Iridanos HS Ilissos	Ζεύς Ωρίων Ουρανός Υπερίων Ηριδανός Ιλισσός	(Greece) Chalkis Shipyards	6	
Tank Landing Ships/ Hovercraft/ Landing Craft (8)
Jason class		L173; L174; L175; L176; L177	HS Chios; HS Samos; HS Ikaria; HS Lesvos; HS Rhodos	Χίος; Σάμος; Ικαρία; Λέσβος; Ρόδος	(Greece) Elefsis Sh.	5	
Zubr class		L181	HS Ithaca	Ιθάκη	(Ukraine) More (Feodosiya)	1	HS Cephalonia, HS Corfu and HS Zakynthos were decommissioned
LCU Klasse 520		L169	HS Herakleia	Ηρακλειά	Germany	1	Former German Barbe-class utility landing craft.
LCM Klasse 521		AB452	HS Schinousa	Σχοινούσα	Germany	1	
Transport Ships (7)
Pandora class		A419; A420	HS Pandora; HS Pandrosos	Πανδώρα; Πάνδροσος	(Greece) Perama Shipyards	2	
Personnel Transfer Ships		L178	HS Naxos	Νάξος	Germany	1	Former Type 520 Landing craft.
Passenger Transfer Ships		A447; A446; A445; A444	HS Ptolemais; HS Demetrias; HS Antigonis; HS Ammonias	Πτολεμαΐς; Δημητριάς; Αντιγονίς; Αμμωνιάς	(Greece) Spanopoulos Group	4	
Mine countermeasures vessels (2)
Osprey class		M61	HS Evniki	Ευνίκη	(United States) Avondale Shipyard, Int. USA	1	1994-1995. Sold to the HN in 2007. HS Kalypso was de-commissioned in July 2025.
Hunt class		M62	HS Europa	Ευρώπη	(United Kingdom) VT Group	1	1986-1988. Transferred to the HN in 2000-2001. HS Kallisto was severely damaged in two pieces after a collision with a Portuguese container vessel.
Miscellaneous Ships (9)
Oceanographic & Hydrographic Survey Vessels		A476; A478	HS Strabon; HS Nautilus	Στράβων; Ναυτίλος	(Greece) Perama Shipyards	2	
Torpedo retrievers		A460; A461; A463	HS Evrotas; HS Arachthos; HS Nestos	Ευρώτας; Άραχθος; Νέστος	Germany	3	
Floating Crane		Π/Γ-4; Π/Γ-6; Π/Γ-8	-	-	(Greece) Perama Shipyards	3	
Training ship		Α484	Kyknos I	Κύκνος Ι	(France) Esterel	1	
MAGURA V5 (USV)					Ukraine	1	(Captured in Lefkada)
Tugboats (10)
Tugboat		A409 A412 A424 A428 A430 A438 A440 A441 A442 A443	HS Achilleus HS Aias HS Jason HS Kadmos HS Atlas HS Antaios HS Diomedes HS Theseus HS Romaleos HS Titan	Αχιλλεύς Αίας Ιάσων Κάδμος Άτλας Ανταίος Διομήδης Θησεύς Ρωμαλέος Τιτάν	Greece United States	10	

=== Unmanned surface vessels ===
Class (Type)	Photo	No.	Name (Name in Greek)	Builder	Active	Notes
Anti-surface warfare/One-Way Attack
Pyrpolitis-class		–	–	Greece		Undergoing integration tests, will be deployed 2026 onwards.
Corsair		–	–	USA	30 on order	Underwent integration tests, LOA submitted to the US in October 2026.
PLUTINO MIKI		–	–	Italy Gaymarine Srl		Underwent integration tests October 2026.
Mine clearance
Pluto Plus		–	–	Italy Gaymarine Srl	3	Deployed 2025 in the minehunter Europi

=== Memorial ships fleet ===
Class (Type)	Photo	No.	Name (Name in Greek)	Builder	Active	Notes
Experimental archaeology ship (1)
Trireme		–	HS Olympias (Ολυμπιάς)	Greece	1	1987. Historical ship reconstruction.
Museum ships (3)
Pisa-class armoured cruiser		–	HS Georgios Averof (Γεώργιος Αβέρωφ)	Italy	1	Museum ship, though ceremonially commissioned.
Fletcher-class destroyer		D16	HS Velos (Βέλος)	United States	1	Museum ship.
Glavkos class (209/1100)		S113	HS Proteus (Πρωτεύς)	(Germany) HDW	1	In service from 1972 to the 16 May 2022. As of February 1, 2025, the submarine reached its final location. The transformation into a museum is completed.

== Future ships ==
=== Submarines ===
A bid for four submarines is ongoing as of 2025 as part of the Achilles' Shield Programme. The potential suppliers and their submarines include:

- HD Hyundai Heavy Industries:
  - KSS-III - Batch 2
- Naval Group:
  - Blacksword Barracuda class
- Saab Kockums:
  - Saab A26 Blekinge
- TKMS:
  - Type 209NG
  - Type 212CD
  - Type 218

=== Surface combat fleet ===
Class (Type)	Photo	No.	Name (Name in Greek)	Planned Comm.	Builder	Ordered (+ option)	Notes
Frigates (6)
Kimon class (FDI class)		F601	HS Kimon (Κίμων)	Dec 2025	(France) Naval Group	4	First FDI Kimon delivered 18 December 2025 Contract for 3 FDI signed in Mar 2022. Contract for 1 additional FDI signed in Sep 2025. Note: parts of the ships built in the Salamis shipyards in Greece.
Kimon class (FDI class)		F602	HS Nearchos (Νέαρχος)	Oct 2026	(France) Naval Group	4	First FDI Kimon delivered 18 December 2025 Contract for 3 FDI signed in Mar 2022. Contract for 1 additional FDI signed in Sep 2025. Note: parts of the ships built in the Salamis shipyards in Greece.
Kimon class (FDI class)		F603	HS Phormion (Φορμίων)	Dec 2026	(France) Naval Group	4	First FDI Kimon delivered 18 December 2025 Contract for 3 FDI signed in Mar 2022. Contract for 1 additional FDI signed in Sep 2025. Note: parts of the ships built in the Salamis shipyards in Greece.
Kimon class (FDI class)		F604	HS Themistokles (Θεμιστοκλής)	Dec 2028	(France) Naval Group	4	First FDI Kimon delivered 18 December 2025 Contract for 3 FDI signed in Mar 2022. Contract for 1 additional FDI signed in Sep 2025. Note: parts of the ships built in the Salamis shipyards in Greece.
Bergamini class (FREMM class)		TBA	Carlo Bergamini	2028	(Italy) Fincantieri	2 (+ 2)	MoU for 2 second-hand ships signed in Sep 2025 with an option for 2 more ships. Preliminary agreement for the first ships signed in Oct 2025. Contract for the first ships signed in Sep 2026.
Bergamini class (FREMM class)		TBA	Virginio Fasan	2029	(Italy) Fincantieri	2 (+ 2)	MoU for 2 second-hand ships signed in Sep 2025 with an option for 2 more ships. Preliminary agreement for the first ships signed in Oct 2025. Contract for the first ships signed in Sep 2026.

== Aircraft ==
=== Aeroplanes ===
Model	Variant	Photo	Origin	Role	Active	Notes
Aeroplanes
Lockheed P-3 Orion	P-3B		United States	ASW, and maritime patrol	1 (+ 4)	Contract signed in February 2016 to reactivate 1 P-3B and to modernise 4 P-3B at HAI.: Reactivated aircraft delivered in May 2019 (only one in service); Test flights of the first modernised aircraft starting in September 2025
Helicopters
Sikorsky SH-60 Seahawk	S-70Β/B-6 Aegean Hawk		United States	ASW, ASuW, SAR	11	11 entered service between 1994 and 2005.
Sikorsky SH-60 Seahawk	MH-60R SeaHawk		United States	ASW	5 (+ 2)	Orders: 4 in July 2020; 3 in April 2021 Deliveries: 3 delivered in March 2024; 2 delivered in October 2026, another 2 to be delivered by the end of 2026
Bell AB 212	AB 212ASW		United States; Italy	ASW	7	
Unmanned aerial vehicles
Alpha 900 systems	A900	(Illustration)	United States; Spain	Maritime surveillance / reconnaissance	5 (systems) 10 × A900	Each system is composed of: 2 × A900 UAV; 1 × maritime control station; 1 × antenna
Schiebel Camcopter S-100	S-100		Austria	Maritime surveillance / reconnaissance	4 (systems) 8 × S-100	Ordered to equip the FDI frigates and to be integrated to its combat management system (SETIS, from Naval Group). Each UAV system is composed of: 2 × S-100 UAV; 1 × Control system with: 2 × workstations; data link
Ucandrone Archytas	—	—	Greece	Maritime surveillance / reconnaissance	1	Vertical take-off / landing winged UAV.

== See also ==
- List of current Greek frigates
- List of decommissioned ships of the Hellenic Navy
- List of former equipment of the Hellenic Armed Forces
