= List of current Greek frigates =

This is a list of frigate classes of the Hellenic Navy.

| Origin | Class & Type | Name | Pennant number | Name in Greek | Photograph | Notes |
|---|---|---|---|---|---|---|
| Germany; Greece | Class: Hydra; Type: Meko-200HN | Hydra; Spetsai; Psara; Salamis | (F 452) (F 453) (F-454) (F 455) | Φ/Γ Ύδρα; Φ/Γ Σπέτσαι; Φ/Γ Ψαρά; Φ/Γ Σαλαμίς | | |
| Netherlands | Class: Elli; Type: Standard | Elli; Limnos; Adrias; Aigaion; Navarinon; Kountouriotis; Kanaris; Themistoklis; Nikiforos Fokas | (F 450) (F 451) (F 459) (F 460) (F 461) (F 462) (F 464) (F 465) (F 466) | Φ/Γ 'Ελλη; Φ/Γ Λήμνος; Φ/Γ Αδρίας; Φ/Γ Αιγαίον; Φ/Γ Ναυαρίνον; Φ/Γ Κουντουριώτης; Φ/Γ Κανάρης; Φ/Γ Θεμιστοκλής; Φ/Γ Νικηφόρος Φωκάς | | Variant of the Dutch Kortenaer-class frigates. Elli and Limnos built specifically for the Hellenic Navy. Eight further Kortenaer-class frigates bought second-hand from the Netherlands. Bouboulina decommissioned in 2013. |
| France | Class: | Kimon-class frigate (kimon-class frigate) | (F 601) (F 602) | Φ/Γ Κίμων Φ/Γ ΝΕΑΡΧΟΣ | | Commissioned in September 2023. |
