= Greek frigate Hydra =

Greek naval ship, launched 1991

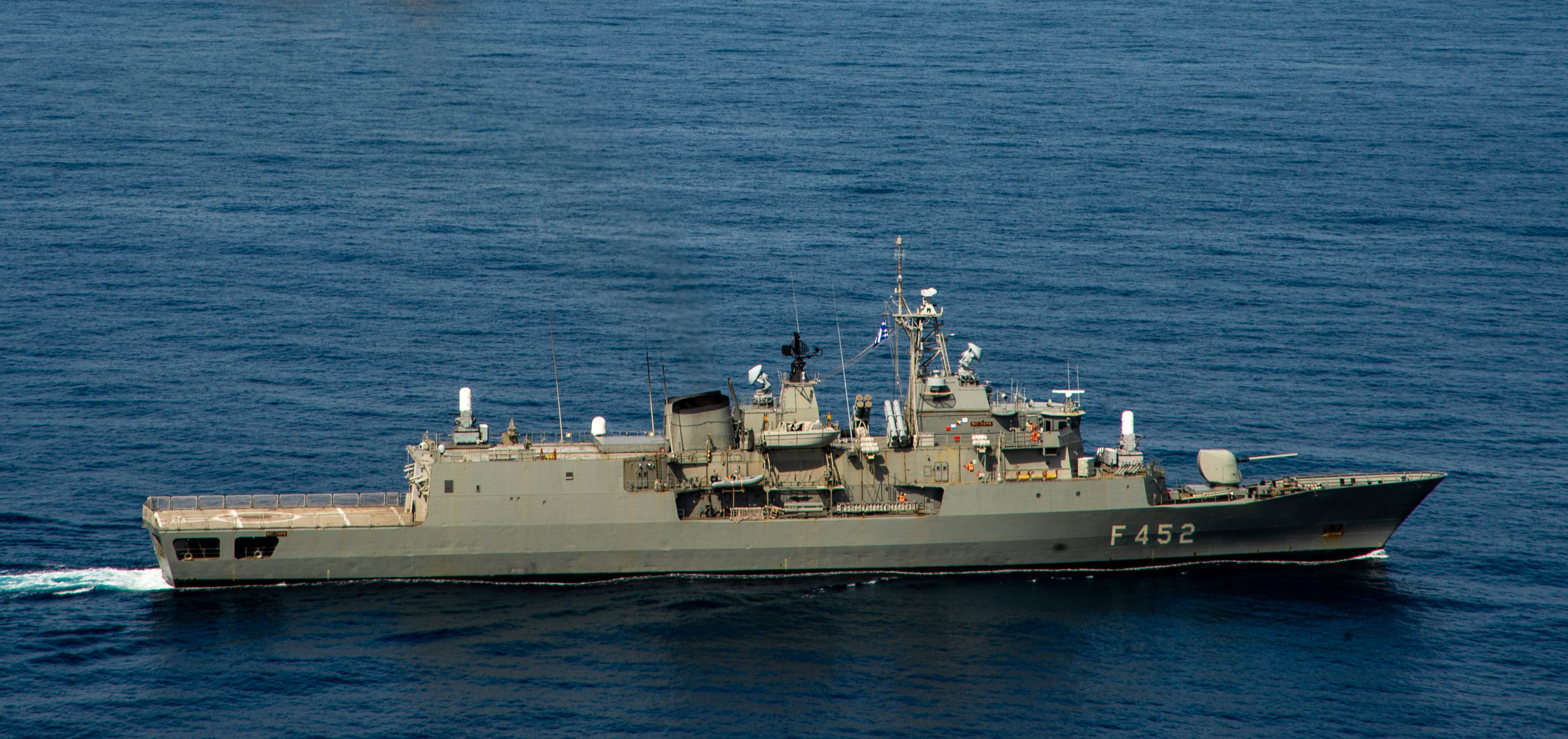
- Hydra (F-452) (Φ/Γ Ύδρα (F-452)

History

Greece
- Name: Hydra
- Namesake: the Hydra Island
- Builder: Blohm + Voss
- Launched: 25 June 1991
- Commissioned: 1992
- Status: in active service

General characteristics
- Class & type: Hydra-class frigate
- Displacement: 3,350 tons
- Length: 117 m (384 ft)
- Beam: 14.8 m (49 ft)
- Draught: 6 m (20 ft)
- Propulsion: 2 shaft CODOG, controllable pitch propellers , 2 General Electric LM2500 gas turbines 60,656 hp (45,231 kW); 2 MTU 20V 956 diesel engines, 10,040 hp (7,490 kW)
- Speed: 31 knots (57 km/h; 36 mph) maximum; 20 knots (37 km/h; 23 mph) cruise
- Range: 4,100 nmi (7,600 km; 4,700 mi) at 16 kn (30 km/h; 18 mph) (diesels)
- Complement: 173
- Sensors & processing systems: Signaal MW08 air search radar; Signaal DA08 air surface radar; 2 Signaal STIR fire control radar; Racal Decca 2690 BT navigation radar; Raytheon SQS-56/DE 1160 hull-mounted and VDS sonar; SLQ-25 Nixie torpedo decoy; Mk XII Mod 4 IFF radar; 2 Signaal Mk 73 Mod 1 radar for ESSM; Signaal STACOS Mod 2 combat data system; SAR-8 IR searcher
- Electronic warfare & decoys: Argo AR 700 ESM system; Telegon 10 ESM system; SME 150 ESM; Argo APECS II ECM system; 4 SCLAR decoy launchers
- Armament: 1 × Mk 45 Mod 2A, 2 × Mk15 Phalanx 20 mm CIWS, 2 Mk141 4 × 8 Harpoon missile launchers, Mk 48 Mod 2 vertical launcher for 16 × RIM-162 ESSM, 2 Mk32 Mod 5 2 × 324 mm (13 in) torpedo tubes for Mk46 torpedoes
- Aircraft carried: 1
- Aviation facilities: Hangar for 1 Sikorsky S-70B-6 Aegean Hawk helicopter

Hydra (F-452) (Greek Φ/Γ Ύδρα) is the lead ship of the Greek Hydra-class frigate and flagship of the Hellenic Navy. The ship was built in the same shipyard as the Blohm + Voss MEKO 200 frigate class, on which its design was based. Three more vessels were built by Hellenic Shipyards Co. at Skaramagas in following years. It is the fifth ship in the Hellenic Navy to bear the name Hydra.

Hydra was the first of four frigates of the MEKO 200 type (the four being Hydra, Spetsai, Psara, and Salamis) ordered by the Greek government. The ship was delivered to the Hellenic Navy on 15 October 1992 and first sailed in Greek waters on 28 January 1993. The crest of the frigate Hydra is the same as that of her predecessor. It is based on one of the flags which the ships of Hydra island sailed under during the 1821 revolution.

In April 1988, the Hellenic Navy proposed and approved the four frigates of the MEKO 200 type in an effort to modernize its fleet. After a lengthy negotiation process, the following contracts were signed to fulfill the program:

- A contract with ΜΕΚΟ Consortium (MC), Blohm + Voss AG and Thyssen Rheinstahl Technik to build the frigate in Germany.
- A second contract with MEKO Consortium to supply parts to Hellenic Shipyards to build the other three Hydra-class frigates in Scaramanga, Greece

On 12 May 2020, Hydra sailed off from her port in Salamis Island to participate in Operation Irini, however the ship was damaged for unknown reasons and had to be replaced by another ship of the same class, Spetsai.

In March 2024, in response to the Red Sea crisis, Hydra was deployed to the Red Sea to protect shipping from Houthi attacks as part of the European Union's Operation Aspides. The ship was equipped with new electronic warfare and anti-drone systems for the mission. On March 13, she spotted two Houthi drones and shot them down with her 127mm gun.

In 25 April, the frigate Hydra fired shots at two drones as part of its mission in EUNAV FOR ASPIDES operation (Operation Shields) in the Gulf of Aden. According to reports, the incident occurred while the navy frigate was helping to protect a merchant vessel in the maritime route. The Greek frigate reportedly shot at two Unmanned Aerial Vehicles (UAVs), in accordance with the Rules of Engagement, where one drone was shot down, and the other changed course.

The ship returned to Greece on 6 June 2024.
