= Greek ship Salamis =

At least three ships of the Hellenic Navy have borne the name Salamis (Greek: Σαλαμίς), after the Greek island of Salamis and the Battle of Salamis:

- Greek battleship Salamis, a battleship ordered from Germany in 1912 and launched in 1914,. She was never delivered and was scrapped incomplete in 1932.
- Greek destroyer Salamis (1944), a B-class destroyer, launched as HMS Boreas in 1930 and renamed on transfer to Greece in 1944. She was returned to the Royal Navy in 1951 and scrapped.
- Greek frigate Salamis (F-455), a Hydra-class frigate launched in 1996.
