= Red Sea Operation =

Red Sea Operation may refer to:

== Military operations ==
- Operation Atalanta, 2008 – present
- Operation Ocean Shield, 2009 – 2016
- Operation Enduring Freedom – Horn of Africa
- Operation Prosperity Guardian, 2023 – present
- Operation Aspides, also known as EUNAVFOR Aspides, 2024 – present

== Films ==
- Operation Red Sea, 2018 Chinese action
