= Abu Dhabi MAR =

Holding company in Abu Dhabi

Coordinates: 24.527838°N 54.391594°E

- Type: Holding Company
- Industry: Shipbuilding
- Founded: 2007
- Headquarters: Abu Dhabi, UAE
- Key people: Iskandar Safa, Managing Director & CEO
- Products: Ships, Submarines, Frigates, mega-yachts, Ship repair
- Owner: Privinvest (30%)
- Number of employees: 19,760 (2017)
- Website: Abu Dhabi MAR

Abu Dhabi MAR (ADM), a holding company based in Abu Dhabi, UAE; is a shipbuilding group with an international presence, and one of the leading shipbuilders in the Persian Gulf.

The group was founded in 2007, and employs around 2,000 people. It specializes in the construction of frigates, mega-yachts, and shiprepairs. The docks owned by the group can handle ships up to a total length of 200 meters.

The shares of the holding company are held by the Privinvest (30%). Its managing director and CEO was Iskandar Safa, board member ). The group's order book exceeds one billion euros.

== History ==
A holding company under the umbrella of Abu Dhabi MAR was founded in 2007 Privinvest (30%). Its principals have owned the French shipyard Constructions Mécaniques de Normandie, based in Cherbourg-en-Cotentin, France, since 1992.

In 2008 Abu Dhabi MAR group entered into a shipbuilding venture — ADMShipyards, located across a deep-water channel from Abu Dhabi's main shipping terminal, Port Zayed.

In July 2009 the group acquired more than 90 percent of the German shipyard Nobiskrug shipyard, based in Rendsburg, Germany.

In October 2009 the group signed a MOU with ThyssenKrupp Marine Systems (TKMS) that involved the establishment of a 50/50 joint venture for the construction of naval surface ships. As per the partnership agreement signed by the two companies, the 50/50 joint venture would see TKMS retain a lead role and know-how in all projects with the German Navy and NATO partners; while Abu Dhabi MAR Group was responsible for the Middle East and North Africa (MENA). It was also agreed that Abu Dhabi MAR would be acquiring 80% of TKMS' key three surface ship firms: Blohm+Voss Shipyards, Blohm + Voss Repair GmbH, and Blohm + Voss Industries.

In September 2010 Abu Dhabi MAR purchased 75.1% of TKMS's Greek subsidiary Hellenic Shipyards Co. at Skaramangas.

In 2011 an agreement was in place for ADM to buy the civil shipbuilding facilities of the former Howaldtswerke-Deutsche Werft (HDW) in the northern German city of Kiel.

== Brands and investments ==
- ADMShipyards, Abu Dhabi, UAE. (100%)
- Nobiskrug, Rendsburg, Germany. (90%)
- Constructions Mécaniques de Normandie, Cherbourg, France. (100%)
- ADM Kiel, Kiel, Germany ( Only the civilian shipbuilding assets of HDW Gaarden included in ADM Kiel)

== Previous investments ==
- Skaramangas Shipyards (formerly Hellenic Shipyards SA, Skaramangas, Greece. (75%)

== See also ==
- Nobiskrug
- Hellenic Shipyards Co.
- Blohm + Voss
- ThyssenKrupp Marine Systems
