= Operation Irini =

European Union Military Operation in the Mediterranean Sea

European Union Naval Force Mediterranean
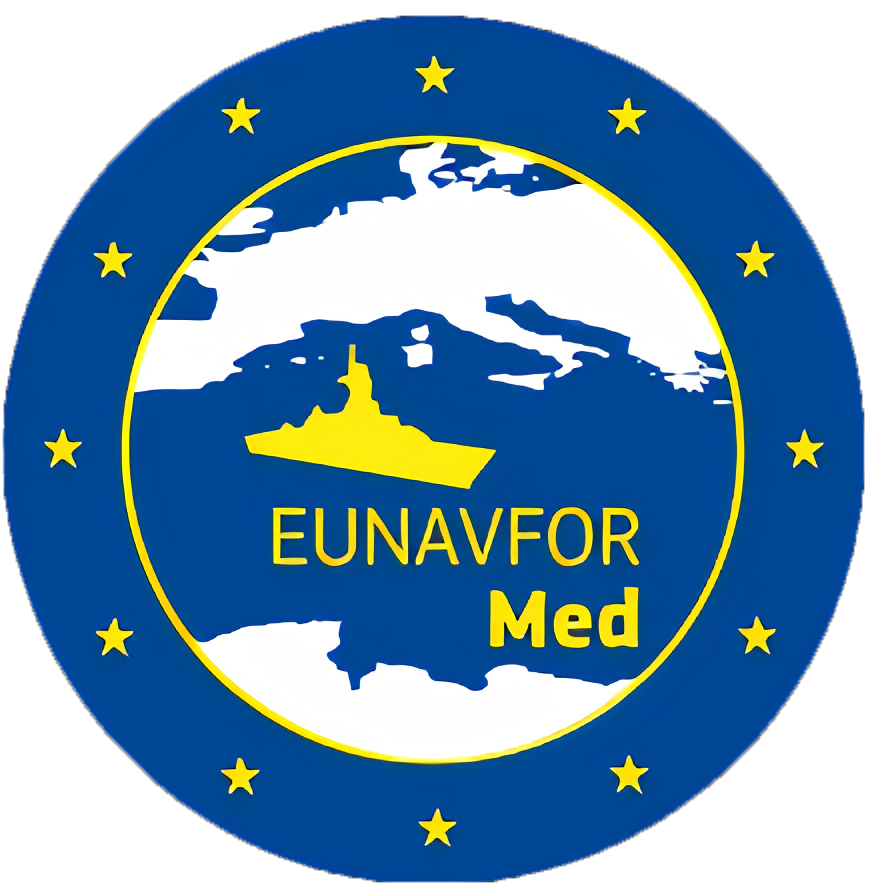
- Emblem of the Operation
- Other name: EUNAVOR MED, Operation Irini
- Political leader: European Union
- Operation Commander: Rear admiral Stefano Turchetto
- Deputy Operation Commander: Rear admiral Jean Jourdain de Muizon
- Chief Of Staff: Brigadier general Matteo Spreafico
- Force Commander: Commodore; Konstantinos Bakalakos
- Dates active: 31 March 2020 – present
- Country: European Union
- Website: Operation Irini

The European Union Naval Force Mediterranean Operation Irini (abbr. EUNAVFOR MED IRINI) is a Common Security and Defence Policy (CSDP) military operation of the European Union, was launched on 31 March 2020 and headquartered in Rome. It was created to help enforce the United Nations arms embargo on Libya during the Second Libyan Civil War, and its name comes from the Greek word for "Peace". It replaced Operation Sophia, which ceased activity at the same time. Besides monitoring arm flows, the operation's activity included training the Libyan Coast Guard and Libyan Navy, contributing to efforts against illicit Libyan oil export, human trafficking and gathering information with air, sea and satellite assets. In March 2025 the Council widened this to surveillance of other illicit activity and the protection of critical maritime infrastructure. In 2026 the operation began flag verification boarding of suspected Russian shadow fleet tankers. The operation's authority to inspect vessels at sea for arms embargo violations rested on United Nations Security Council Resolution 2292 (2016), which the EU reported had ceased to be operative in May 2026. In October 2026 the Council extended the mandate to the 31 of March 2029 and added a shadow fleet task. Between its launch and 1 February 2026 the operation carried out checks on 21,836 ships. The operation has been repeatedly in dispute with Turkey, which has refused flag state consent for Turkish flagged vessels on numerous occasions.

== Mission ==
The primary mission of the operation is to ensure the implementation of the UN arms embargo. Other missions include the training of the Libyan Coast Guard and Libyan Navy, the disruption of human trafficking and halt the illicit exports of Libyan oil.

In March 2025, the Council expanded the operation’s mandate to include the monitoring, surveillance and information gathering of additional illicit activities beyond arms and oil trafficking. It was also tasked with collecting information relevant to the protection of critical maritime infrastructure and contributing to contingency planning.

== Duration ==
The former Operation Sophia permanently ceased its activity at the same time of the launch of Irini. Operation Irini has been extended multiple times over the years with the latest extension prolonging the mandate until 31 March 2027.

== Assets ==
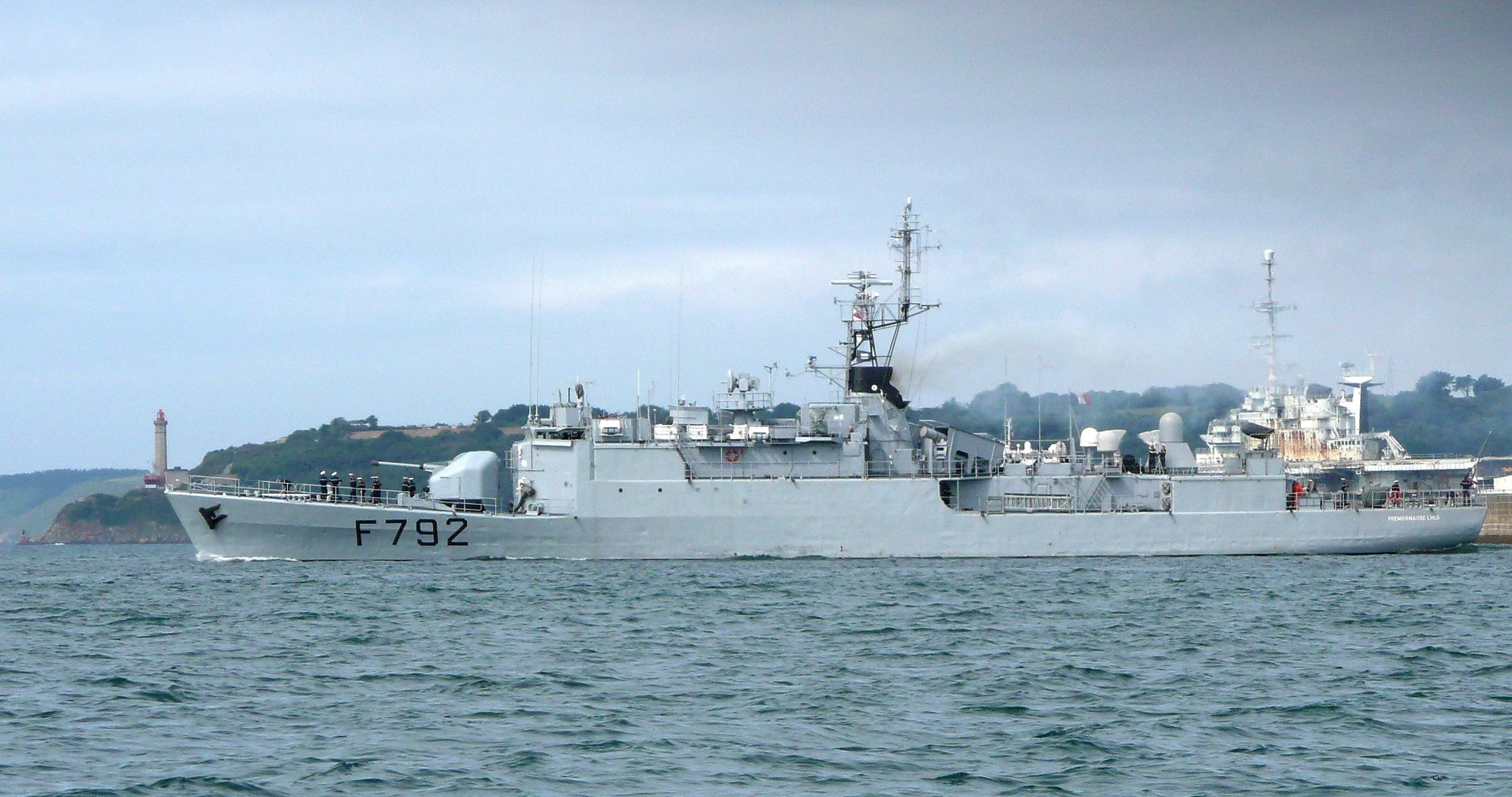
Premier-Maître L'Her in 2008

=== Naval assets (active) ===
France: D'Estienne d'Orves-class aviso Premier-Maître L'Her
Greece: Elli-class frigate Aigaion - flagship
Italy: Comandanti-class patrol vessel Comandante Borsini

=== Air assets (active) ===
France: Atlantique 2
France: Falcon 50 from July 2020
Germany: P-3C Orion from May 2020
Greece: EMB-145H from July 2020
Italy: Predator B from July 2020
Luxembourg: Swearingen Merlin from 4 May 2020
Poland: An-28B1R Bryza from May 2020

=== Previously deployed assets ===
==== Naval assets (past) ====
France: Cassard-class frigate Jean Bart from 4 May 2020, left 1 June 2020
France: Georges Leygues-class frigate Latouche-Tréville from 7 October 2020
Germany: Sachsen-class frigate Hamburg from 18 August 2020 to 14 December 2020.
Germany: Type 212 submarine U-35 from 12 June 2021 to 14 December 2021.
Greece: Hydra-class frigate Spetsai from 4 June 2020, left 17 August 2020
Greece: Elli-class frigate Adrias
Greece: Elli-class frigate Limnos from 17 September 2020
Italy: San Giorgio-class amphibious transport dock San Giorgio - from 17 July 2020 to 7 September 2020
Italy: Bergamini-class frigate Carlo Margottini - from 7 September 2020
Italy: Comandanti-class patrol vessel Comandante Cigala Fulgosi
Portugal: Tridente-class submarine NRP Tridente - from 24 June 2021 to 20 August 2021

=== Planned but never deployed ===
Greece: Hydra-class frigate Hydra expected May 2020, but not deployed

== Criticism ==
=== Government of National Accord ===
In April 2020, the Government of National Accord (GNA) in Libya objected to the operation on the ground that it would affect the supply of arms from Turkey.

=== Malta ===
In May 2020, Malta pulled out of Operation Irini and threatened to veto EU funds for the operation, in a move that could have impacted on the Turkish–Libyan agreement. Malta complained to the European Commission that it does not give enough support to Malta on the issue of migration, the EU responded that "The Irini operation was conceived to stop the fighting in Libya and political stabilisation is a precondition to stop the migrant wave. So to stop the migration push, we need to politically stabilise Libya, and this depends on [Irini]," while Turkey has said that it will provide concrete and effective assistance to Malta. In addition, Malta, Turkey and the GNA have issued a joint statement expressing reservations about the IRINI.

=== Russia ===
In early June 2020, Russia was the only Security Council member which raised concerns about renewing authorization for the operation, which was due to expire on 10 June.

=== Turkey ===
In June and July 2020, Turkey criticized the operation as being "not objective" and claimed that the operation is supporting Khalifa Haftar. In June of the same year, European diplomats and officials stated that Turkey was blocking EU attempts to secure NATO's help for the operation. In addition, in August 2020, Turkey criticized Germany for its participation in the operation, after Germany decided to send a frigate in August. In November 2020, the Turkey’s National Security Council said that Turkey will take necessary steps in every field against the Operation Irini, after a German frigate, participating in the operation, tried to search a Turkish-flagged freighter near Libya. In addition, the Ankara Chief Public Prosecutor's Office launched an investigation ex officio for the incident. Furthermore, Turkey has denied the inspection of suspect Turkish vessels on many occasions (see the "Incidents" section below).

== Incidents ==
In May 2020, a French warship participating in the operation intercepted the Gabon-flagged oil tanker Jal Laxmi off the coast of Tobruk and stopped it from docking at the city. The vessel had not received authorization from the Tripoli-based Libyan National Oil Corporation. Following the event, Russia raised concerns regarding the operation's authorization.

On 10 June 2020, the Greek frigate Spetsai under the command of the Irini operation attempted to inspect the Tanzanian-flagged cargo vessel Çirkin which was suspected of carrying arms to Libya, but was ordered to retreat after warnings from Turkish frigates accompanying the cargo vessel. According to sources, the Turkish commander's message was that "the Turkish ship is under the protection of the Turkish Republic." EU confirmed that Turkey blocked the check on the ship.

Later, on 17 June 2020, France also accused Turkish ships of harassing a French warship from the NATO Operation Sea Guardian as they tried to inspect Çirkin and that the Turkish Navy was using their NATO call signs while accompanying Turkish vessels suspected of breaking the UN arms embargo on Libya. According to French officials, when the French ship tried to inspect the vessel, the Turkish vessel switched off its tracking system, masked its ID number and refused to say where she was going, while the Turkish frigates flashed their radar lights three times against the French warship, suggesting a missile strike was imminent. On the other hand, Turkish officials, denied that the warship was harassed and claimed that the French warship did not establish communications with the Turkish vessel during the incident and provided fuel for the Turkish vessel. At a request of France, NATO stated on 18 June that it would investigate the incident. NATO carried out three-week investigation into the incident, producing a 130-page report published on 1 July. The report did not include a "statement supporting the French claims that Turkish warships harassed the French warship by locking its radar on it". The report of NATO's investigation was never released publicly. Diplomats told Reuters that the investigation was too sensitive to discuss in public and does not apportion blame, adding that NATO wanted to keep Turkey onside and for this there was no willingness to point a finger. On 21 September 2020, the EU sanctioned the Turkish maritime company Avrasya Shipping which operated the freighter Çirkin, because the vessel was found to have violated the arms embargo in Libya in May and June 2020.

On 22 November 2020, the German frigate Hamburg, which participated in the operation, intercepted the Turkish 16,000-tonne freighter, Rosalina-A (or Rosaline-A), about 200 km (120 mi) north of the Libyan city of Benghazi. Soldiers from the frigate boarded the Turkish freighter in order to search it but had to abandon checks and withdraw after Turkey protested. According to the German spokesman, Hamburg had followed standard procedure by waiting four hours for approval from the flag country, and then boarding. Later, once the objection arrived, they withdrew. The German defense ministry spokesman said that "By the time the soldiers left the ship, they had not found anything suspicious." Turkey said that the search team had violated international law by not waiting for permission from Turkey, adding that the ship was carrying various materials such as food and paint. Furthermore, Turkey summoned the envoys of the European Union, Germany and Italy to Ankara in order to protest against the operation. Turkey condemned the incident, saying that Operation Irini is a biased mission that targets Turkey and the internationally recognized Government of National Accord (GNA) in Libya.

European Union in an official statement said that the Operation Irini gave five hours notice to Turkey (four hours in line with the international maritime practice plus a one hour extension at the request of the Turkish Embassy in Rome, where Operation Irini's headquarters are located). After the time elapsed and no answer has received from Turkey, the soldiers boarded the ship and started the inspection in accordance with internationally agreed procedures including NATO procedures. Later, when Turkey formally and with delay notified of its refusal to grant the permission for inspection, the search operation terminated and the soldiers left the ship. Until then, nothing suspicious has found on the ship. In addition, the statement reminded that the Irini operation is in accordance with the UN Security Council resolutions 2292 (2016) and 2526 (2020) and that the UN Security Council resolution 2292 (2016) calls upon all flag states to cooperate with inspections. These resolutions are binding for all UN member states, including Turkey. A secret EU report cited by the Deutsche Presse-Agentur, indicated that the Turkish vessel had long been watched on suspicion of making illegal arms shipments. In addition, Der Spiegel reported that Operation Irini's military analysts, in a report for United Nations, had previously spotted arms being unloaded in the Libyan port of Misrata in satellite images. Furthermore, EU report's authors said that suspicious cargo was again sighted in November while the ship was docked in the Turkish port of Ambarli. Turkish prosecutors launched an investigation into the incident on 27 November 2020, which was not expected to lead to arrests or the extradition of officials involved in the search.

In July 2021, Irini's forces intercepted a Zambian-flagged vessel called MV Gauja for being suspected of transporting illegal arms from Morocco to Libya. The Zambian government said that it does not own the vessel and that it is Russian operated. In September 2021, an Irini report revealed that Turkey refused the inspection of Turkish ships heading to Libya six times.

In May 2022, Turkey refused to accept the inspection of the Turkish-flagged vessel MV Kosovak which headed to the port of Misrata in Libya.

In July 2022, Irini inspected the Equatorial Guinea-flagged vessel MV Victory Roro and found that it breached the UN arms embargo. The vessel was suspected, since it had been identified by UN Panel of Experts of transferring military equipment in Libya before under the name MV Luccello and the flag of the Comoros. In addition, Irini commanders asked the permission from Turkey to inspect another ship called MV Parpali, but Turkey rejected it. Irini commanders wrote on a statement that all UN members are called by United Nations Security Council (UNSC) to cooperate with inspections.

In October 2022, the Irini commanders asked for the inspection of the Turkish-flagged vessel MV Matilde A, which was heading to Libya, in accordance with UN Security Council Resolution 2292 on the arms embargo on Libya, but Turkey refused again. Same month, Irini found and seized military vehicles in the merchant vessel MV MEERDIJK coming from the United Arab Emirates and heading to Libya. In the October 2022 report on Operation Irini, it was mentioned that Turkey has denied the inspection of suspect Turkish vessels on nine occasions since the launch of the operation.

In March 2023, Turkey denied inspection to Turkish-flagged MV Kosovak as requested by Irini commanders. The UN Security Council called upon all UN members to cooperate with inspections. Again, in October 2023 Turkey denied inspection to the MV Kosovak.

In November 2023, Turkey declined a request from IRINI to board and inspect the MV MATILDE A, a vessel suspected of breaching the UN arms embargo.

In September 2024, Turkey once again denied Operation IRINI permission to inspect the MV MATILDE A. It was the twelfth time that Turkey denied the inspection of suspect Turkish vessels.

== Developments since 2025 ==
=== Mandate and legal basis ===
On 24 May 2026, United Nations Security Council Resolution 2292, which had authorised regional organisations including Irini to inspect vessels on the high seas off Libya suspected of violating the arms embargo ceased to be operative. The legal framework for the operation's role in countering oil smuggling was separately renewed by Resolution 2819 on 14 April, 2026. On 9 October 2026, the Council of the EU adopted decision (CFSP) 2026/2243, extending the operation to 31 March 2029. According to one analyst, the decisions adds a tusk of contributing to "constraining" the Russian shadow fleet in compliance with the United Nations Convention on the Law of the Sea, plus maritime domain awareness and protection of critical maritime infrastructure with common cost for April 2027 to March 2029 set at €16.88 million and without conferring a new inspection power.

=== Shadow fleet boardings ===
Following an agreement between EU defence ministers in Nicosia on 8 June 2026, Irini was used for a campaign against vessels that are false flagged fraudulently certified or in breach of maritime safety rules. By early June the operation reported having stopped three vessels - the Cameroon flagged tankers ''Nelsa'' (11 May), ''Oneiroi'' and ''Sandhya''. The vessels were reported to continue their voyages afterwards and the results of the inspection were not made clear. Further boardings followed through the summer, including of the tanker ''MV Sun'' and an interception highlighted by Kaja Kallas on 22 July 2026. In August 2026, Operation Atalanta was authorized to carry out flag verification boardings of suspected shadow fleet vessels in the same way as Irini.

=== Command, assets and exercises ===
By early 2026 the operation commander was Rear Admiral Marco Casapieri of the Italian Navy. In June 2026 the naval component was reported to include the Italian offshore patrol vessel ''Francesco Morosini'' and the Greek frigate ''Kanaris'', supported by Luxembourgish and Polish maritime patrol aircraft. From 3 to 12 June 2026 the operation conducted the "Nereus 2026" focused operations, a ten day surge of naval and air activity in the central Mediterranean and Aegean.

== See also ==
- Emigration from Africa
- African immigration to Europe
- Operation Mare Nostrum
- Operation Triton
- Operation Sea Guardian
- Turkish military intervention in the Second Libyan Civil War
