= HSY-55-class gunboat =

Class of naval vessel of the Hellenic Navy

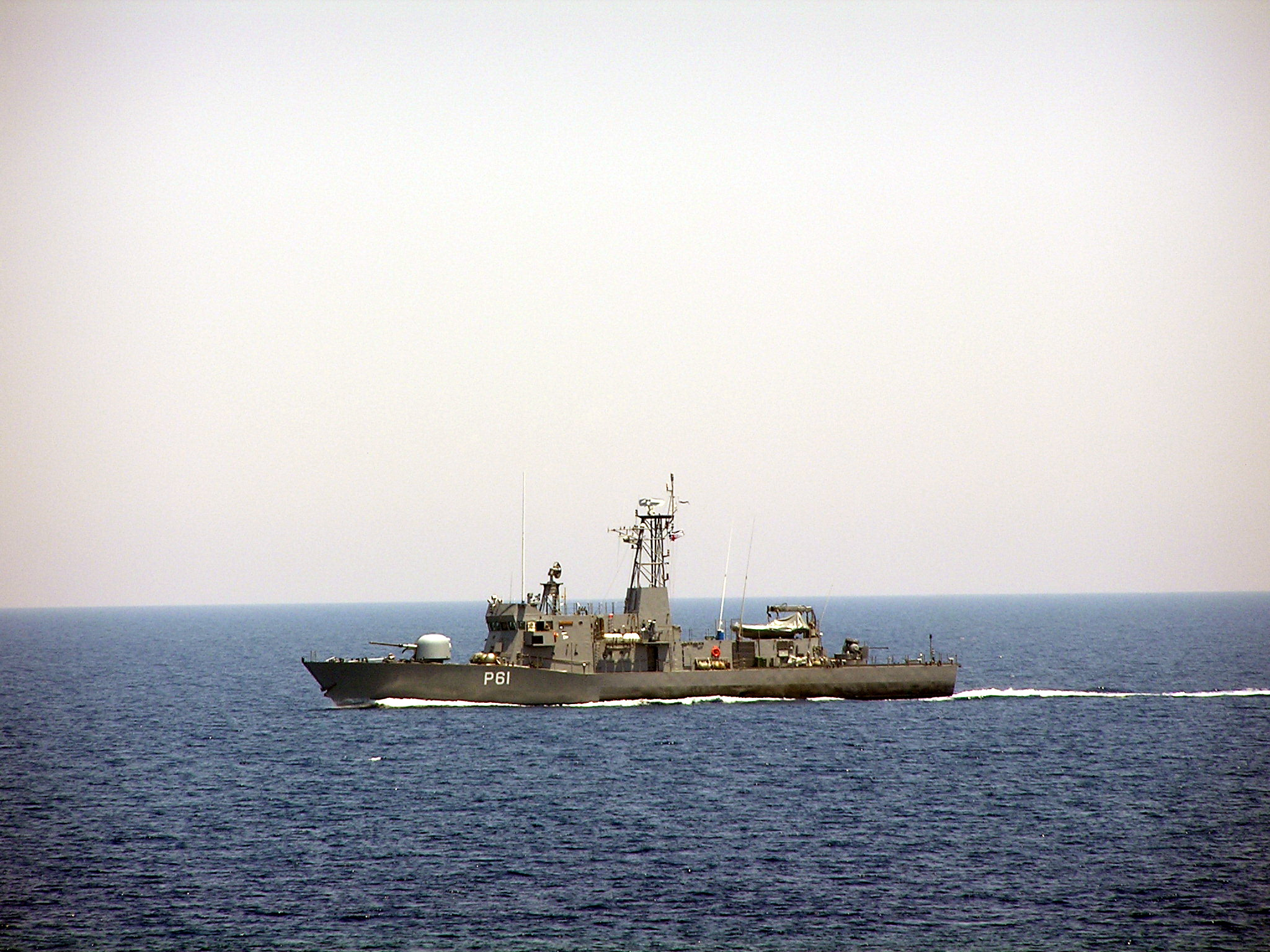
- Polemistis (P 61)

Class overview
- Operators: Hellenic Navy
- Built: 1990–1993
- In commission: 1993–present
- Completed: 2
- Active: 2

General characteristics
- Type: Patrol boat
- Displacement: 595 t (586 long tons) full load
- Length: 56.5 m (185 ft 4 in)
- Beam: 10 m (32 ft 10 in)
- Draught: 2.7 m (8 ft 10 in)
- Propulsion: 2 × Wärtsilä Nohab 16V25 diesels, 9,200 hp (6.9 MW) sustained; 2 shafts
- Speed: 24 knots (44 km/h; 28 mph)
- Range: 2,470 nmi (4,570 km) at 15 kn (28 km/h; 17 mph); 900 nmi (1,700 km) at 24 kn (44 km/h; 28 mph)
- Troops: 23
- Complement: 36 (6 officers)
- Sensors & processing systems: Thomson-CSF Triton; I-band surface search radars; Selenia Elsag NA 21 weapons control
- Armament: 4 × McDonnell Douglas Harpoon SSM; 1 × OTO Melara 3 in (76 mm)/62 compact gun; 1 × Bofors 40 mm; 2 × 20 mm guns; 2 × Mine rails

The HSY-55-class gunboat is a class of naval vessel designed by the Hellenic Navy and built by Hellenic Shipyards (HSY). This class of ship uses the modular concept, so that weapons & sensors can be changed as required. These vessels are similar in appearance to Osprey 55-class gunboat. The first pair was ordered on 20 February 1990 but completion was delayed by the shipyard's financial problems. Pyrpolitis (P57) was launched on 16 September 1992 and Polemistis (P61) on 21 June 1993. Each ship can carry 25 fully equipped troops. Alternative guns & Harpoon SSM can be fitted, as required.

Pyrpolitis was renamed Kasos on 11 November 2005, after the island of Kasos in the Dodecanese. The ship is based in the area of Kasos, and the name recognises the island and its inhabitants during Kasos Massacre of the Greek War of Independence.

== Ships ==
Ship	Builder	Commissioned	Status
P57 Kasos Κάσος (formerly Pyrpolitis Πυρπολητής)	Hellenic Shipyards S.A.	4 May 1993	In active service (2025)
P61 Polemistis Πολεμιστής	Hellenic Shipyards S.A.	16 June 1994	In active service (2025)

== See also ==
- Current Hellenic Navy ships
- Osprey HSY-56A-class gunboat

== External link ==
- L.S. Skartsis, "Modern Greece's Machines: A Comprehensive Guide to Greek Vehicle & Machine Manufacturers (1700 to Present)" (2026) ISBN 978-618-00-6734-7 (open access eBook)
