= Operation Aspides =

EU military operation in the Red Sea

- Part of Red Sea crisis, Middle Eastern crisis (2023–present)
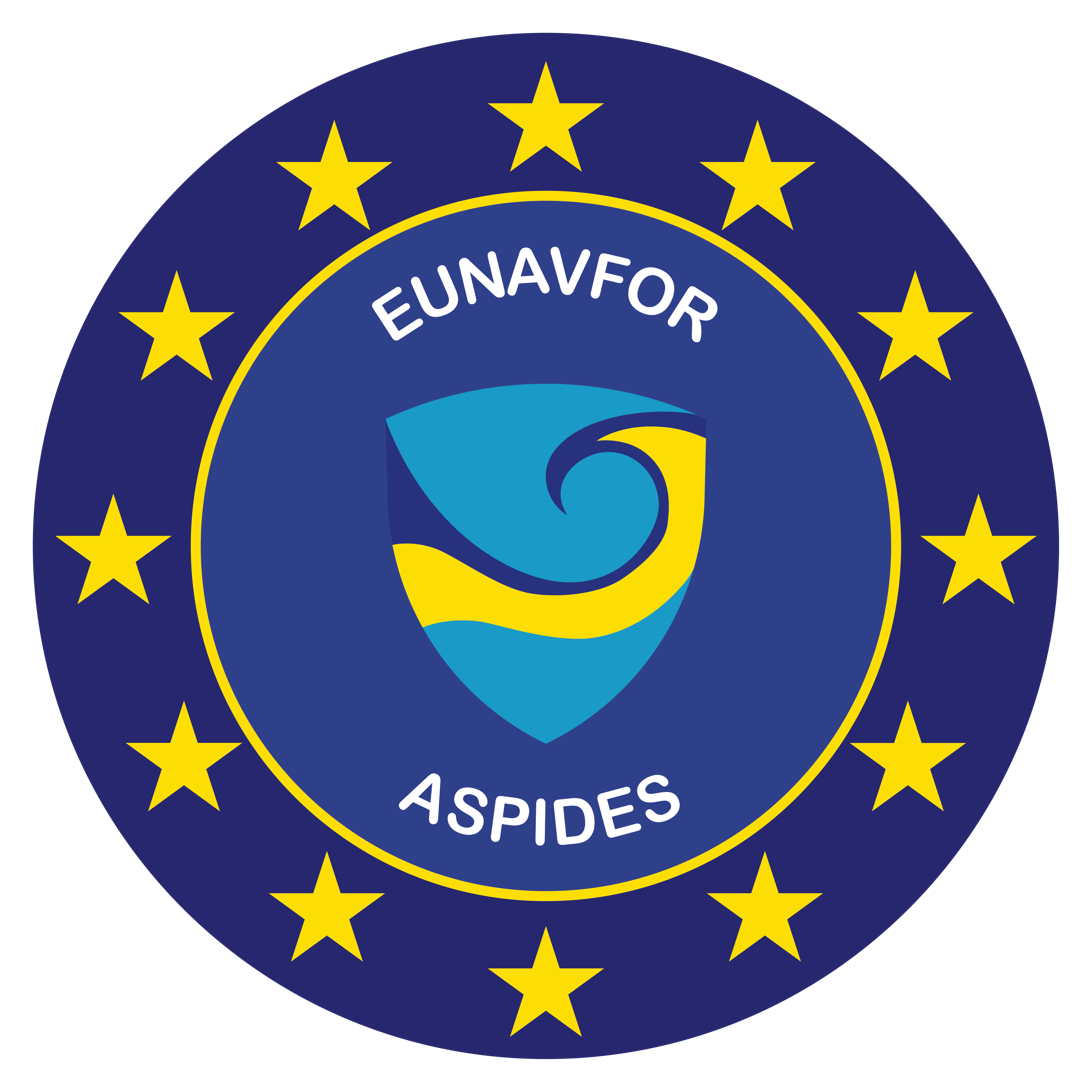
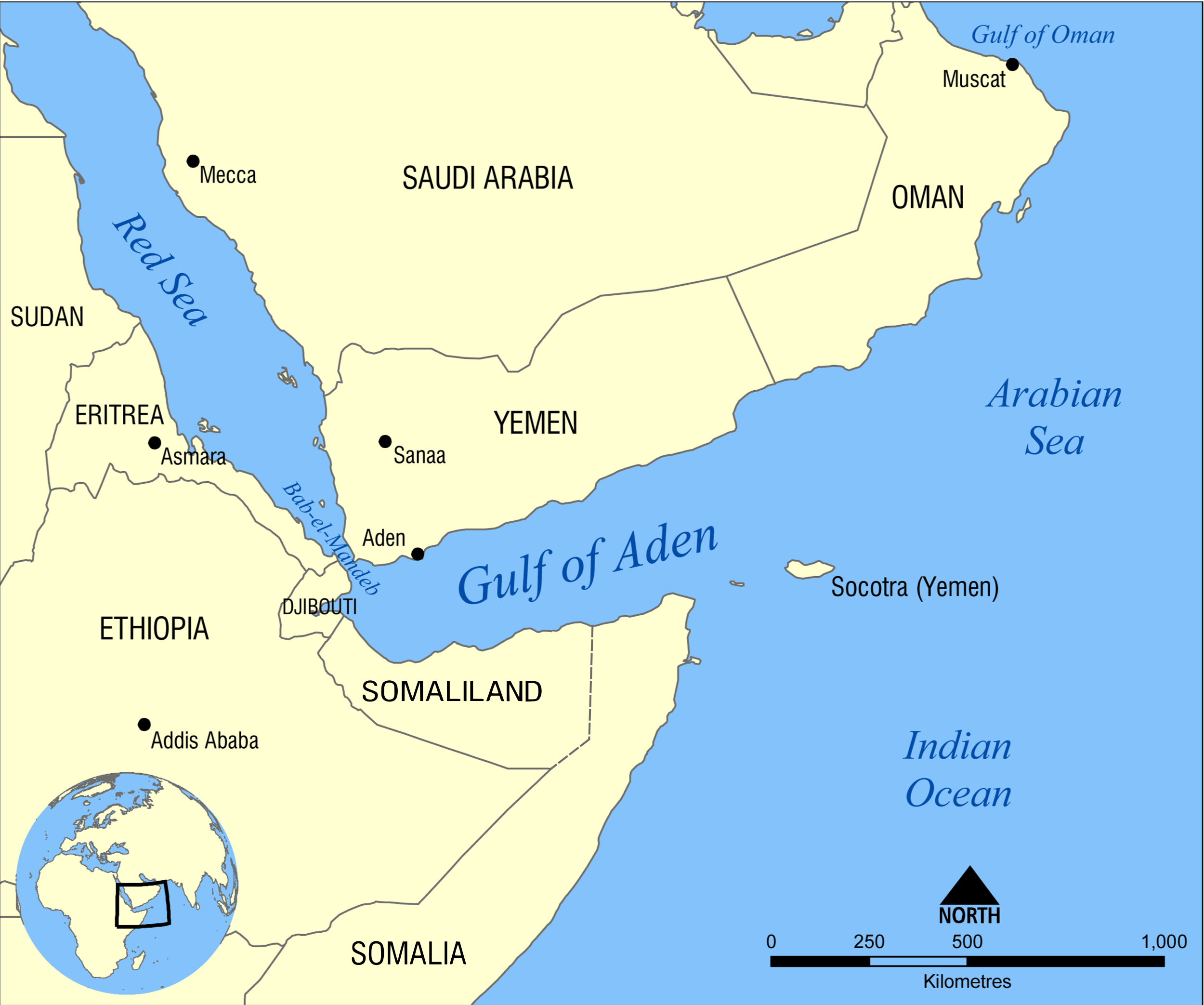
Date	19 February 2024 – present (2 years, 6 months and 1 week)
Location	Red Sea, Gulf of Aden, Yemen
Result	Ongoing

Belligerents
European Union: Belgium; Estonia; Finland; France; Germany; Greece; Italy; Latvia; Netherlands; Sweden	Yemen (SPC): Yemeni Navy (SPC faction); Houthis

Commanders and leaders
Unified Command; Kaja Kallas (2024–present); Josep Borrell (2024); OCdr Vasileios Gryparis; FCdr Commodore Michail Pantouvakis National leaders Bart De Wever (2025–present); Alexander De Croo (2024–2025); Emmanuel Macron; Friedrich Merz (2025–present); Olaf Scholz (2024–2025); Kyriakos Mitsotakis Giorgia Meloni	Abdul-Malik al-Houthi; Mohamed al-Atifi; Mahdi al-Mashat Abdel-Aziz bin Habtour

Strength
1 Destroyer; 1 Joint support ship 2 Frigates Various aerial assets	(Yemen) Unclear (see Houthi armed strength)

Casualties and losses
	18 UAVs; 2 USVs; 4 ballistic missiles intercepted (As of 12 February 2025)

Operation Aspides, also known as European Union Naval Force (EUNAVFOR) Aspides, is an EU military operation in response to Houthi attacks with international shipping in the Red Sea. Named after the Greek word for shields (Greek: Ασπίδες), the EU describes Operation Aspides as a "purely defensive" mission to increase maritime surveillance in the region, provide escort to merchant vessels, and defend against strikes. The mission began in February 2024 and includes two or three ships deployed at any given time.

== Background ==
Since the start of the Israel–Gaza war, the Houthi movement has engaged with and boarded certain ships passing through the Red Sea, as a response to the Israeli attacks in Gaza and the rest of Palestine since October.

Since the beginning of the conflict up to February 2024, at least four EU country-flagged ships have been struck by the Houthis.

== Mission ==
On 8 February 2024, EU member states took a decision in the Council of the European Union to start Operation Aspides, which was to begin on 19 February and last one year, with its base of operations being in Greece and with a Hellenic Navy officer being in charge of operations.

According to the European External Action Service, the purpose of the operation is to protect merchant vessels against strikes, to accompany them and to reinforce maritime situational awareness in the region. It thus has a "purely defensive" mandate, something which has also been underlined by EU officials, in contrast to the US-led Operation Prosperity Guardian. The mission is instructed to coordinate closely with Operation Atalanta, another EU-led naval mission in the wider region.

The EUNAVFOR ASPIDES Area of Operations – AOO, according with its mandate, comprise the Baab al-Mandab Straits and the Strait of Hormuz, as well as international waters in the Red Sea, the Gulf of Aden, the Arabian Sea, the Gulf of Oman and the Persian Gulf.

On 14 February 2025, Council of the EU decided to prolong the mandate of the operation until 28 February 2026. On that day, however, the Israeli–U.S. war with Iran began, and the mission remained on high alert.

On 9 March 2026, French president Emmanuel Macron announced that France is sending additional ships to the region to set up an escort mission for the Strait of Hormuz with other states, due to the crisis, in the framework of EUNAVFOR Operation Aspides.

== Force structure ==
=== Operation Headquarter ===
EUNAVFOR Aspides is led by the Operation Commander, Rear Admiral Vasileios Gryparis HN. He was appointed as Operation Commander on 8 February 2024 and promoted to Rear Admiral on 2 March 2024.

The operational headquarters of EUNAVFOR ASPIDES is the Hellenic European Union Operational Headquarters (EL EU OHQ) in Larissa, Greece. The European External Action Service has indicated that 130 staff officers will be based in the operational headquarters.

On 22 February 2024, the Government of Sweden announced that Sweden would be sending some military personnel to participate in Operation Aspides. Sweden will initially send four staff officers with the possibility to increase the number to ten. On 8 March, Finland made a decision to participate in the operation by sending a maximum of five soldiers with staff duties, in addition to dispatching up to two soldiers with similar responsibilities to Operation Prosperity Guardian. On 28 March, the government of Estonia announced that one member of the Estonian Defence Forces will participate in the operation. Similarly, the Latvian National Armed Forces have also been greenlighted to participate in the operation.

==== Force Command ====
The Force Commander (FCdr) exercises command and control of all military forces in the area of operation. He and his staff are operating from a flagship in the Red Sea. Since 2 February 2025, the Force Commander is Commodore Michail Pantouvakis (HEL Navy), aboard Italian Destroyer FEDERICO MARTINENGO. The previous Force Commander till 2 November 2024 was the Commodore Konstantinos Pitykakis (HEL Navy) serving aboard Italian destroyer Caio Duilio. The post was first held by Italian Rear Admiral Stefano Costantino, based on the Italian destroyer Caio Duilio, and from 29 April on the Italian frigate Virginio Fasan. From 15 June 2024, Netherlands Commodore George Pastoor took over the role, serving from on board the Netherlands joint support ship Karel Doorman till 8 August 2024. From 8 August 2024 Rear Admiral Massimo Bonu took over the role of the Force Commander till 2 November 2024.

Ships currently participating in Operation Aspides
Ship	Nationality	Class	Notes	Reference
Andrea Doria	Italian Navy	Destroyer	Entered the area of operations on 20 July 2024, replacing Italian frigate Virginio Fasan, serving as Flagship since 8 August 2024.	
Forbin	French Navy	Frigate	Entered the area of operations in June 2024.	
Chevalier Paul	French Navy	Frigate		
Psara	Hellenic Navy	Frigate	Replaces Hydra, arrived in the area of operations in June 2024.	

Ships previously participating in Operation Aspides
Ship	Nationality	Class	Notes	Reference
Caio Duilio	Italian Navy	Destroyer	Served as operation flagship until 29 April 2024.	
Virginio Fasan	Italian Navy	Frigate	Deployed under operation Aspides from 19 April to 20 July 2024, serving as operation flagship from 29 April to 15 June under Italian Rear Admiral Stefano Costantino.	
Federico Martinengo	Italian Navy	Frigate	–	
Hessen	German Navy	Frigate	Embarks two Sea Lynx Mk88A. Left the area of operations on 21 April 2024 after a successful deployment.	
Louise-Marie	Belgian Navy	Frigate	Scheduled to transit the Suez Canal on April 12, deployment postponed due to failed operational and technical tests while transiting the Mediterranean Sea, including an incident where a RIM-7 Sea Sparrow missile was reportedly "stuck" in its launch tube. On 27 April, the issues were resolved and Louise-Marie set course for the area of operations. Louise Marie remained in the area of operations until departing in late June 2024.	
Hydra	Hellenic Navy	Frigate	In the area of operations from April to June, replaced by HS Psara.	
Languedoc	French Navy	Frigate	–	
Alsace	French Navy	Frigate	–	
Tromp	Royal Netherlands Navy	Frigate	Embarking an NH90. Was deployed under Operation Prosperity Guardian for 25 days from late March 2024 to late April 2024 while en route to the Indo-Pacific, delivering "associated support" for Operation Aspides. During the deployment, Tromp was once raised to general quarters, the first such incident in the Royal Netherlands Navy since the Yugoslav Wars.	
Karel Doorman	Royal Netherlands Navy	Joint support ship	Served as operation flagship from 15 June to 8 August 2024. Deployed from May to August under operation Aspides, embarking a Eurocopter AS532 Cougar and a Swedish surgical team, and delivering "associated support" for Operation Prosperity Guardian. Deployment to the Red Sea was delayed in early May due to technical issues with the Goalkeeper CIWS, extending its stay in Crete Naval Base for several days, departing for the area of operations on 10 May.	

== Timeline of events ==
On 27 February 2024, the German frigate Hessen engaged and destroyed two Houthi drones.

On 2 March, the Greek frigate Hydra passed the Suez Canal to join the operation in the Red Sea. On the same day, the Italian destroyer Caio Duilio shot down a Houthi missile over the Red Sea. The missile was within 4 miles (6.4 km) of the destroyer when it was shot down. On 12 March, the Italian Ministry of Defense reported that the Caio Duilio had shot down two Houthi drones in self-defense.

On 13 March, the Greek frigate Hydra shot down two Houthi drones.

On 12 April, Belgian frigate Louise-Marie failed technical operational tests in the Mediterranean Sea while en route to the area of operations, delaying her deployment indefinitely. The test failures reportedly included a case where a RIM-7 Sea Sparrow missile got "stuck" in its launch tube.

On 20 March, a French Navy helicopter deployed in the area of the Gulf of Aden, the Strait of Bab el-Mandeb and the Red Sea to fight against the Houthi rebels shot down a drone, the first time this had happened.

On 21 March, a German Navy Sea Lynx Mk88A helicopter engaged and destroyed an uncrewed surface vessel (USV) when it approached a civilian convoy under tow. On the same day, the French frigate Alsace shot down three Houthi ballistic missiles.

As of 26 March, the French had fired 22 Aster missiles.

On 6 April, the German frigate Hessen intercepted a missile launched from Houthi-controlled territory.

On 25 April, the Greek frigate Hydra fired shots at two drones as part of its mission in the Gulf of Aden. According to reports, the incident occurred while the frigate was deployed to protect a merchant vessel in the maritime route. The Greek frigate reportedly shot at two unmanned aerial vehicles (UAVs) using its 127 mm cannon: one drone was shot down, and the other altered course away from the merchant vessel.

On 27 April, the issues affecting the deployment of Belgian frigate Louise-Marie were resolved, and the ship set course to the area of operations in the Red Sea.

On 8 May, the Netherlands Ministry of Defence announced Karel Doorman was suffering from technical issues with one of its weapons systems, delaying the deployment into the Red Sea. Independent reports confirmed the issues were with the Goalkeeper CIWS, which was deemed fully operational upon departure from the Netherlands on 21 April. After departing Crete Naval Base on 2 May, the vessel was spotted there again on 4 May, where it awaited repairs until setting sail for the area of operations on 10 May.

On 13 June, the merchant vessel Verbena was struck by a Houthi missile attack. A heavily wounded crewmember was evacuated to Karel Doorman for medical treatment.

On 15 June, Force Command transitioned from Italian Rear Admiral Stefano Costantino to Dutch Commodore George Pastoor, serving the role from aboard Karel Doorman.

On 7 July, the Greek frigate Psara repelled a Houthi-launched drone strike of four drones, downing two of them.

On 20 July, the Italian destroyer Andrea Doria joined the area of operations, replacing the departing Italian frigate Virginio Fasan

On 8 August, command transitioned from Dutch Commodore George Pastoor aboard Karel Doorman, departing the area, to Italian Commodore Massimo Bonu aboard Italian destroyer Andrea Doria.

On 21 August, the entire crew of the tanker Sounion was rescued while the ship was drifting about 77 nautical miles (143 km; 89 mi) to the west of Al Hudaydah port, using the French frigate Chevalier Paul to evacuate the crew to nearby Djibouti on 22 August 2024.

While engaged in rescue operations, Chevalier Paul sighted an approaching Houthi explosive boat and successfully engaged and destroyed it with the frigate's 20 mm Narwhal guns.

== See also ==
- Yemeni civil war (2014–present)
- Operation Ocean Shield
- Operation Sankalp
- Operation Irini
