= Osprey 55-class gunboat =

Class of naval ship

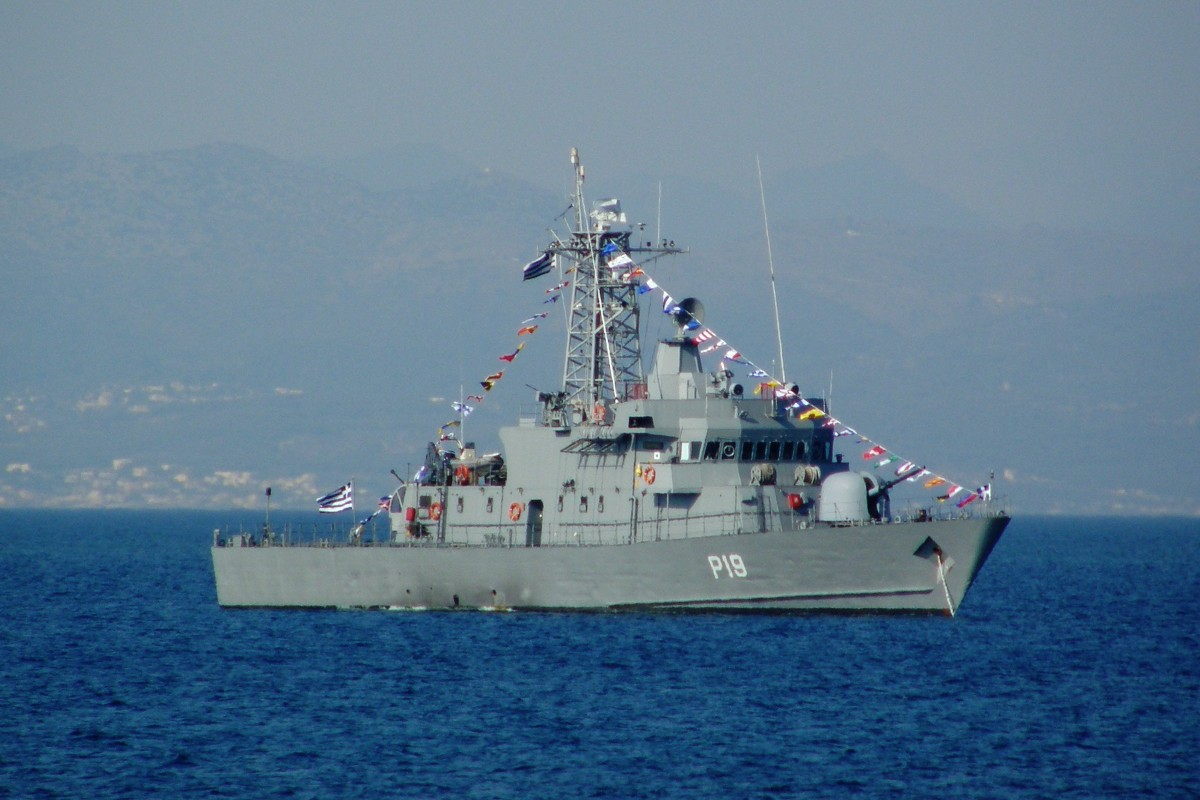
- Osprey 55-class gunboat P-19 HS Navmachos at Faliron Bay, Greece.

Class overview
- Builders: Hellenic Shipyards, Scarmanga (Greek ships); Danyard A/S, Frederikshaven, Denmark
- Operators: Hellenic Navy; Royal Moroccan Navy; Senegal Navy
- Built: 1986–1990
- Completed: 7
- Active: 7

General characteristics Armatolos class (after re-arming)
- Type: Gunboat
- Displacement: 555 long tons (564 t) full load
- Length: 54.8 m (179 ft 9 in)
- Beam: 10.5 m (34 ft 5 in)
- Draught: 2.6 m (8 ft 6 in)
- Propulsion: 2× MTU 16V 1163 TB63 diesels; 10,000 hp (7,500 kW); 2 shafts
- Speed: 25 kn (29 mph; 46 km/h)
- Range: 500 mi (430 nmi; 800 km) at 25 kn (29 mph; 46 km/h); 2,800 mi (2,400 nmi; 4,500 km) at 12 kn (14 mph; 22 km/h)
- Troops: 25
- Complement: 36
- Sensors & processing systems: Thomson-CSF Triton Surface search radar; Selenia RTNX fire control radar
- Electronic warfare & decoys: Thomson-CSF DR 2000S ESM
- Armament: 1× OTO Melara 76 mm gun; 1× Bofors 40 mm gun; Provision for mines

The Osprey 55-class gunboat is a Danish-designed class of naval ship currently in service in the Hellenic Navy and Royal Moroccan Navy. Two ships were ordered by Greece in March 1988 and built by Hellenic Shipyards. The first one was laid down on 8 May 1989 and launched on 19 December 1989. The second ship was laid down on 9 November 1989 and launched on 16 May 1990. Armament is of modular design and therefore can be changed. 76-millimetre (3 in) guns replaced the Bofors 40 mm (1.6 in) guns in 1995, after being taken from decommissioned Gearing-class destroyers. Options on more of the class were shelved in favour of the slightly larger HSY-55 class.

Four other ships were ordered by the Royal Moroccan Navy all received between 1987 and 1990. Built in Frederikshavn, Denmark, they were only armed with one Bofors 40 mm and two Oerlikon 20 mm cannon. El Lahiq is equipped with a cartographic sonar and North American navigation systems for hydrographic research.

== Incidents at sea ==
On 4 May 2018, a Turkish-flagged cargo ship named Karmate (IMO: 8135461, MMSI: 271002030) collided with HS Armatolos P-18 off the coast of the island of Lesbos, while the gunboat was participating in a NATO mission (called Aegean Activity for controlling migrant flows into the Aegean) in the Aegean Sea. According to available information, before the collision, the captain of the gunboat sounded warning horns and sent repeated radio messages, but there was no response from the Turkish ship, while the Turkish ship violated maritime safety rules (like giving priority to a military vessel). The damage to the Greek gunboat was very small, according to the available information from the Greek minister of defence.

== Ships ==
Pennant number	Name	Navy	Builder	Launched	Commissioned	Status
Greece
P 18	Armatolos	Hellenic Navy	Hellenic Shipyards Co.	19 December 1989	27 March 1990	In service (2020)
P 19	Navmachos	Hellenic Navy	Hellenic Shipyards Co.	16 May 1990	15 July 1990	In service (2020)
Morocco
308	El Lahiq	Royal Moroccan Navy	Danyard A/S Frederickhaven	July 1987	11 November 1987	In service (2018)
309	El Tawfiq	Royal Moroccan Navy	Danyard A/S Frederickhaven	October 1987	31 January 1988	In service (2018)
316	El Hamiss	Royal Moroccan Navy	Danyard A/S Frederickhaven	April 1990	9 August 1990	In service (2018)
317	El Karib	Royal Moroccan Navy	Danyard A/S Frederickhaven	July 1990	23 September 1990	In service (2018)
Senegal
Without number	Fouta	Senegal Navy	Danyard A/S Frederickhaven	March 1987	1 June 1987	In service (2018)

== Sources ==
- Baker, A.D. (1998). The Naval Institute Guide to Combat Fleets of the World 1998–1999. Annapolis, Maryland, USA: Naval Institute Press. ISBN 1-55750-111-4.
- Saunders, Stephen (2002). Jane's Fighting Ships 2002–2003. Coulsdon, UK: Jane's Information Group. ISBN 0710624328.
- Hellenic Navy website
