= Greek frigate Psara =

Greek Hydra-class frigate

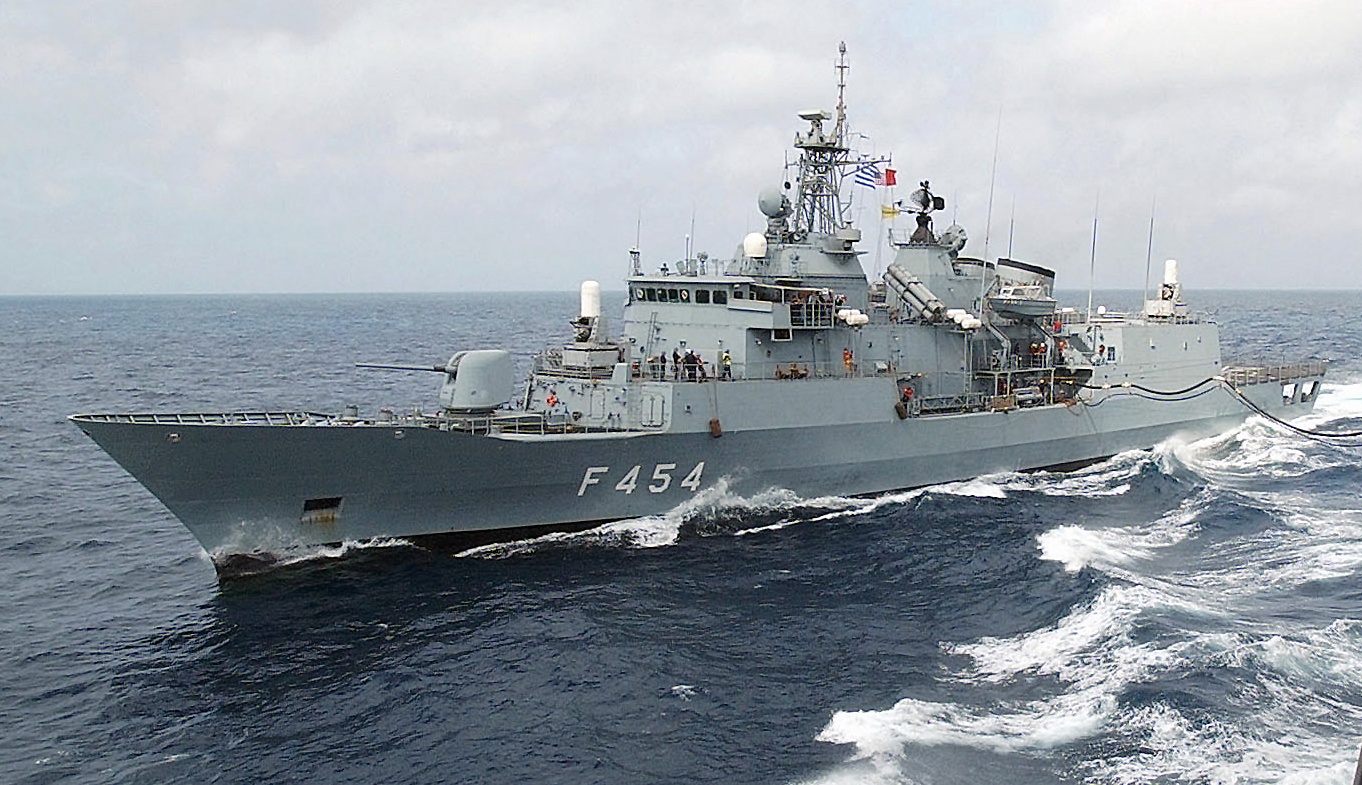
- Psara (F-454) (Φ/Γ Ψαρά (F-454)

History

Greece
- Namesake: the Psara Island
- Builder: Hellenic Shipyards Co.
- Launched: 20 December 1994
- Commissioned: 1998
- Status: in active service

General characteristics
- Class & type: Hydra-class frigate
- Displacement: 3,350 tons
- Length: 117 m (383.9 ft)
- Beam: 14.8 m (48.6 ft)
- Draft: 6 m (19.7 ft)
- Propulsion: 2 shaft CODOG, controllable pitch propellers; 2 General Electric LM2500 gas turbines 60,656 hp (45,231 kW); 2 MTU 20V 956 diesel engines, 10,040 hp (7,490 kW)
- Speed: 31 knots (57 km/h) maximum
- Range: 4,100 nmi (7,600 km; 4,700 mi) at 16 knots (30 km/h) (diesels)
- Complement: 173
- Sensors & processing systems: Signaal MW08 air search radar; Signaal DA08 air surface radar; 2 Signaal STIR fire control radar; Racal Decca 2690 BT navigation radar; Raytheon SQS-56/DE 1160 hull-mounted and VDS sonar; SLQ-25 Nixie torpedo decoy; Mk XII Mod 4 IFF radar; 2 Signaal Mk 73 Mod 1 radar for ESSM; Signaal STACOS Mod 2 combat data system; SAR-8 IR searcher
- Electronic warfare & decoys: Argo AR 700 ESM system; Telegon 10 ESM system; Argo APECS II ECM system; 4 SCLAR decoy launchers; Centaur C-UAS system
- Armament: 1 × 127 mm Mk 45 Mod 2A; 2 × Mk15 Phalanx 20 mm CIWS; 2 Mk141 4 × 8 Harpoon missile launchers; Mk 48 Mod 2 vertical launcher for 16 × RIM-162 ESSM; 2 Mk32 Mod 5 324 mm (13 in) torpedo tubes for Mk46 torpedoes
- Aircraft carried: 1
- Aviation facilities: Hangar for 1 Sikorsky S-70B-6 Aegean Hawk helicopter

The Greek frigate Psara (F-454) (Greek: Φ/Γ Ψαρά) is the third ship of the Greek Hydra-class frigates. It is based on the Blohm + Voss MEKO 200 frigate class and was built by Hellenic Shipyards Co. at Skaramangas as part of the programme. She has participated in various NATO and international operations such as Sharp Guard, Decisive Enhancement, Operation Enduring Freedom, EU Operation Atalanta.

On 29 March 2009, as flagship of EU NAVFOR Atalanta, Psara was involved in the capture of Somalian pirates fleeing from an unsuccessful hijack attempt on the German tanker Spessart, along with HNLMS De Zeven Provinciën, the Spanish frigate Victoria and USS Boxer.

On 19 June 2024, in response to the Red Sea crisis, Psara was deployed to the Red Sea to protect shipping from Houthi attacks as part of the European Union's Operation Aspides. The ship was equipped with new electronic warfare and anti-drone systems for the mission.

On 7 July 2024 in the Gulf of Aden, Psara, while providing close protection to a merchant vessel, engaged four UAVs which were posing a significant threat to the freedom of navigation. As a result, two UAVs were downed, while the rest changed their course.

The ship called at India's Mumbai Port from 11 to 13 July 2025.

In March 2026, Psara was deployed to Cyprus to assist in defense against Iranian attacks together with the Kimon frigate and four F-16 fighter jets.
