= Chalkis Shipyards =

Greek maritime construction yard

Chalkis Shipyards S.A.
- Company type: S.A.
- Industry: Shipbuilding
- Founded: 1971
- Founder: Yiannis Carras
- Headquarters: Chalcis, Greece
- Products: Ships
- Owner: Stavros Elias
- Number of employees: 100 (2020)
- Website: www.chalkis-shipyards.gr

Chalkis Shipyards S.A. is a large shipyard in Aulis, in Evia, Central Greece, near Chalkis.

One of the largest shipyards in operation in Greece, Chalkis Shipyards has two floating docks, a mechanical workshop, a plate shop, a piping shop, an electrical shop, a carpentry shop, and power supply substations.

Chalkis Shipyards is currently expanding operation in offshore wind technology announcing works on innovative design of floating wind plants in collaboration with National Technical University of Athens and Hellenic Centre for Marine Research. The design is called FloatMast platform and the purpose is to create a new turbine technology. To this end Chalkis shipyards aims to invest €100 million.
