= Greek support ship Atlas =

General supply ship of the Hellenic Navy

History

Greece
- Name: Atlas
- Owner: Hellenic Navy
- Launched: 1999
- Acquired: 2019
- Commissioned: 2 December 2019
- Identification: A471

General characteristics
- Displacement: 3,010 tonnes
- Length: 70.4
- Beam: 16.03
- Draught: 6.73
- Speed: 16 knots (30 km/h)

HS Atlas (A471) is a general supply ship used by the Hellenic Navy. The ship was formerly a platform supply vessel operating for Norway's Simon Møkster Shipping under the name Stril Neptun. It was sold to Greek shipowner's Panos Laskaridis company, Baltmed Reefer Services in October 2019. Soon after its delivery to Baltmed Reefer Services it was donated to the Hellenic Navy. The ship was painted with the colours of the Hellenic Navy and underwent the appropriate modifications. It was commissioned into the Hellenic Navy in December 2019.

Among the tasks of the ship are the following:

- Supply of other navy ships with fuel and drinking water
- Offshore tugging. It is the largest tug boat of the Hellenic Navy with a bollard pull of 112 tonnes-force
- Operation as a submarine rescue ship
