= Greek frigate Salamis =

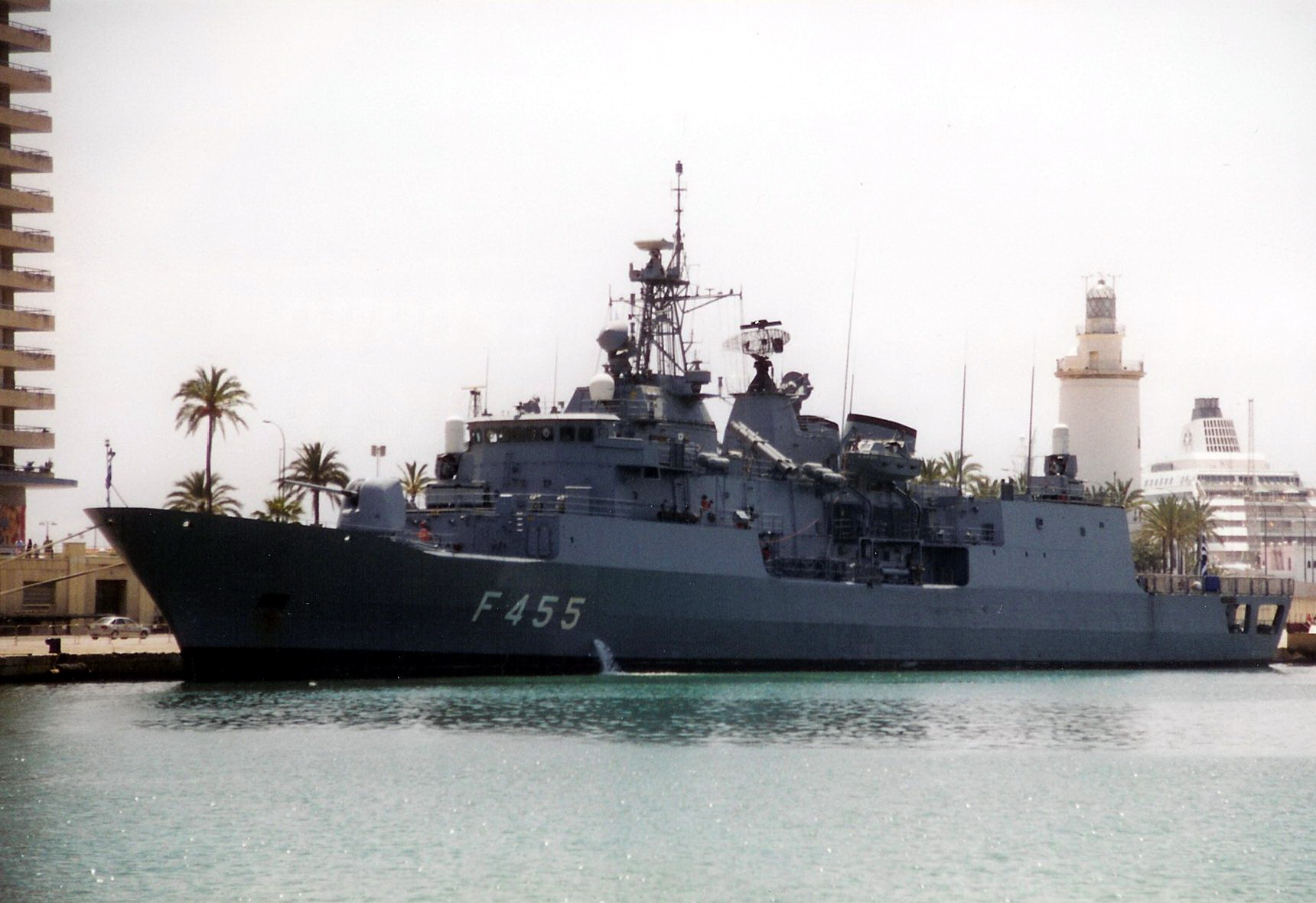
- Salamis (F-455); Φ/Γ ΣΑΛΑΜΙΣ (F 455)

History

Greece
- Name: Salamis
- Namesake: Battle of Salamis
- Builder: Hellenic Shipyards Co.
- Laid down: 20 December 1994
- Launched: 15 May 1996
- Commissioned: 16 December 1998
- Status: in active service as of 2023
- Notes: Official Hellenic Navy page

General characteristics
- Class & type: Hydra class frigate
- Displacement: 3,350 tons
- Length: 117 m (384 ft)
- Beam: 14.8 m (49 ft)
- Draft: 6 m (20 ft)
- Propulsion: 2 shaft CODOG, controllable pitch propellers , 2 General Electric LM2500 gas turbines 60,656 hp; 2 MTU 20V 956 diesel engines, 10,040 hp
- Speed: 31-knot (57 km/h) maximum; 20-knot (37 km/h) cruise
- Range: 4,100 nmi (7,600 km; 4,700 mi) at 16 knots (30 km/h; 18 mph) (diesels)
- Complement: 173
- Sensors & processing systems: Signaal MW08 air search radar; Signaal DA08 air surface radar; 2 Signaal STIR fire control radar; Racal Decca 2690 BT navigation radar; Raytheon SQS-56/DE 1160 hull-mounted and VDS sonar; SLQ-25 Nixie torpedo decoy; Mk XII Mod 4 IFF radar; 2 Signaal Mk 73 Mod 1 radar for ESSM; Signaal STACOS Mod 2 combat data system; SAR-8 IR searcher
- Electronic warfare & decoys: Argo AR 700 ESM system; Telegon 10 ESM system; Argo APECS II ECM system; 4 SCLAR decoy launchers
- Armament: 1 × Mk 45 Mod 2A, 2 × Mk15 Phalanx 20 mm CIWS, 2 Mk141 4 × 8 Harpoon missile launchers, Mk 48 Mod 2 vertical launcher for 16 × RIM-162 ESSM, 2 Mk32 Mod 5 2 × 324mm T/T for Mk46 torpedoes
- Aircraft carried: 1
- Aviation facilities: Hangar for 1 Sikorsky S-70B-6 Aegean Hawk helicopter

The Greek frigate Salamis (F-455) (Greek: Φ/Γ ΣΑΛΑΜΙΣ) is the fourth ship of the Greek Hydra frigate class. It is based on the Blohm + Voss MEKO 200 frigate class and was built by Hellenic Shipyards Co. at Skaramagas. It is the third ship of the Hellenic Navy to be named after Salamis Island and the famous Battle of Salamis, the first being the uncompleted dreadnought Salamis.
