= Greek frigate Spetsai =

1993 Hydra-class frigate

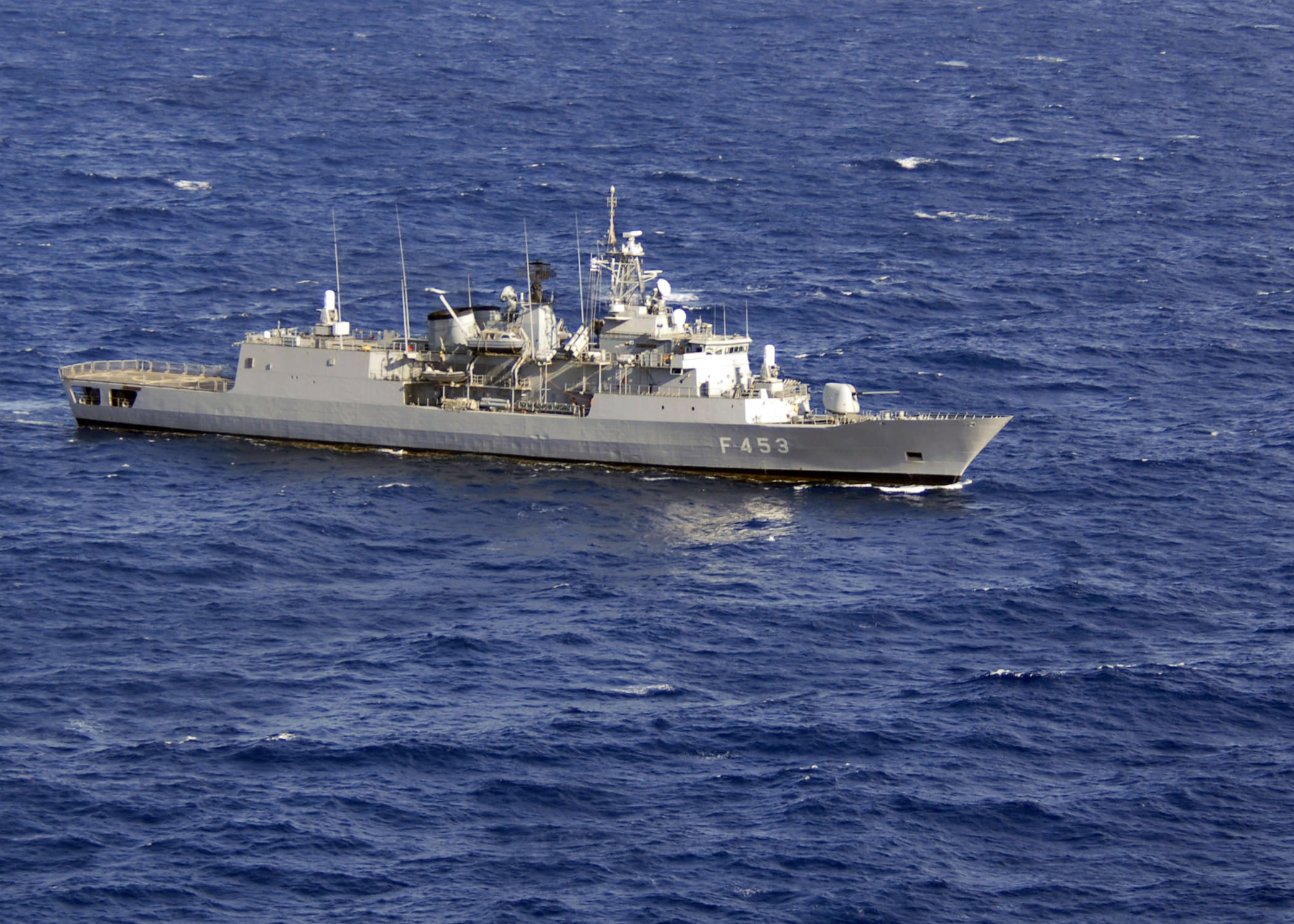
- Spetsai (F-453); Φ/Γ ΣΠΕΤΣΑΙ (F 453)

History

Greece
- Namesake: Spetses
- Builder: Hellenic Shipyards Co.
- Laid down: 11 August 1992
- Launched: 9 December 1993
- Commissioned: 24 October 1996
- Status: in active service as of 2010
- Notes: Official Hellenic Navy page

General characteristics
- Class & type: Hydra class frigate
- Displacement: 3,350 tons
- Length: 117 m (384 ft)
- Beam: 14.8 m (49 ft)
- Draft: 6 m (20 ft)
- Propulsion: 2 shaft CODOG, controllable pitch propellers , 2 General Electric LM2500 gas turbines 60,656 hp; 2 MTU 20V 956 diesel engines, 10,040 hp
- Speed: 31-knot (57 km/h) maximum; 20-knot (37 km/h) cruise
- Range: 4,100 nmi (7,600 km; 4,700 mi) at 16 knots (30 km/h; 18 mph) (diesels)
- Complement: 173
- Sensors & processing systems: Signaal MW08 air search radar; Signaal DA08 air surface radar; 2 Signaal STIR fire control radar; Racal Decca 2690 BT navigation radar; Raytheon SQS-56/DE 1160 hull-mounted and VDS sonar; SLQ-25 Nixie torpedo decoy; Mk XII Mod 4 IFF radar; 2 Signaal Mk 73 Mod 1 radar for ESSM; Signaal STACOS Mod 2 combat data system; SAR-8 IR searcher
- Electronic warfare & decoys: Argo AR 700 ESM system; Telegon 10 ESM system; Argo APECS II ECM system; 4 SCLAR decoy launchers
- Armament: 1 × Mk 45 Mod 2A, 2 × Mk15 Phalanx 20 mm CIWS, 2 Mk141 4 × 8 Harpoon missile launchers, Mk 48 Mod 2 vertical launcher for 16 × RIM-162 ESSM, 2 Mk32 Mod 5 2 × 324mm T/T for Mk46 torpedoes
- Aircraft carried: 1
- Aviation facilities: Hangar for 1 Sikorsky S-70B-6 Aegean Hawk helicopter

The Greek frigate Spetsai (F-453) (Greek: Φ/Γ ΣΠΕΤΣΑΙ) is the second ship of the Greek Hydra frigate class. She is based on the Blohm + Voss MEKO 200 frigate class and was built by Hellenic Shipyards Co. at Skaramagas. She is the fifth ship of the Hellenic Navy to be named after the Saronic Gulf island of Spetses. She has participated in international operations such as Enduring Freedom.
