= Hydra-class frigate =

Class of Greek frigates

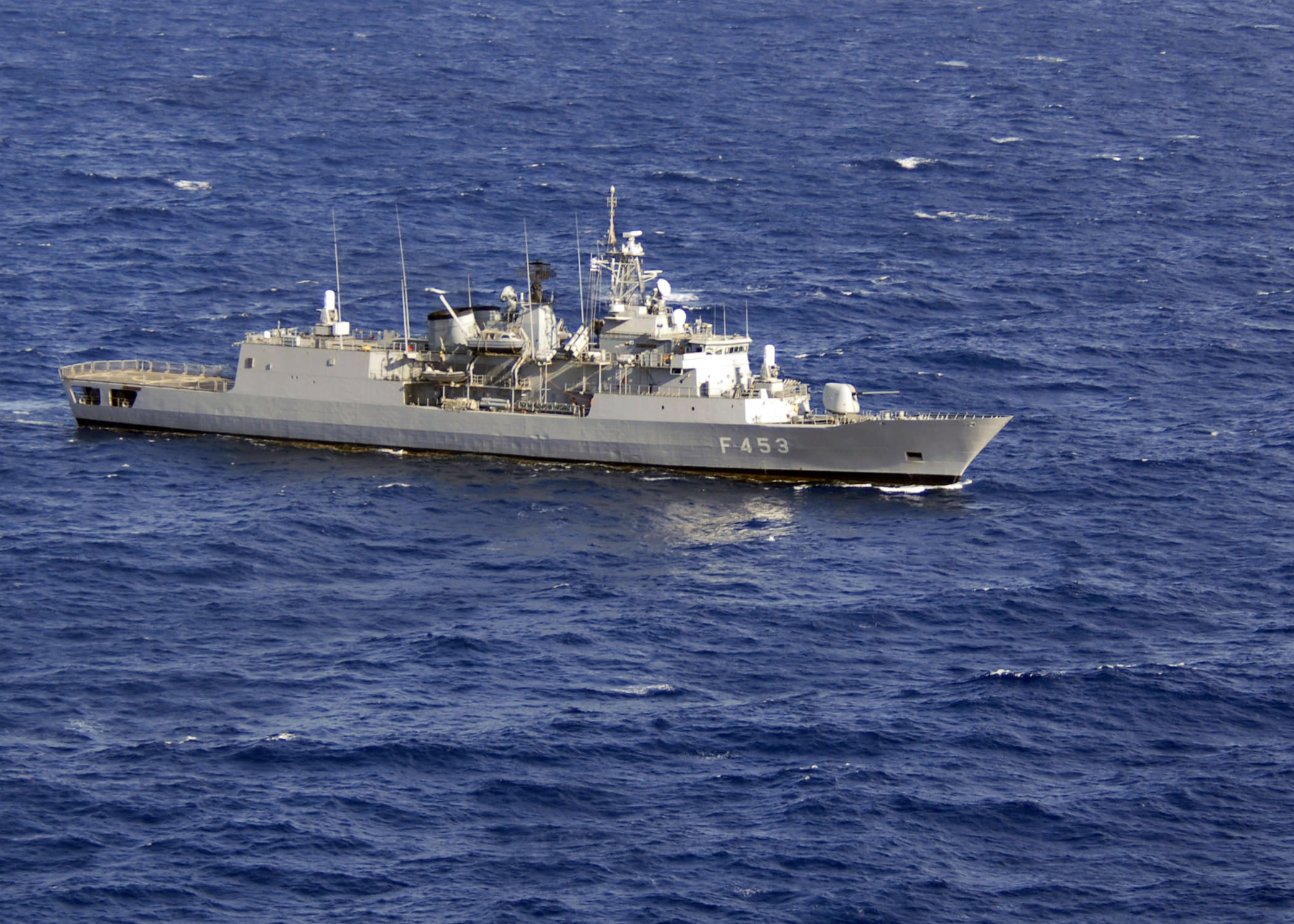
- HS Spetsai transits the Mediterranean Sea during Phoenix Express (2008)

Class overview
- Name: Hydra, MEKO 200 HN
- Builders: Blohm + Voss, Hellenic Shipyards
- Operators: Hellenic Navy
- In commission: 1992–present
- Planned: 6
- Completed: 4
- Canceled: 2
- Active: 4

General characteristics
- Type: Frigate
- Displacement: 3,360 tons standard; 4,000 tons full load
- Length: 117.5 m (385 ft 6 in)
- Beam: 14.8 m (48 ft 7 in)
- Draught: 6.0 m (19 ft 8 in)
- Propulsion: 2 shaft CODOG, controllable pitch propellers , 2 General Electric LM2500 gas turbines 60,656 hp (45,231 kW); 2 MTU 20V 956 diesel engines, 10,040 hp (7,490 kW)
- Speed: 31 knots (57 km/h; 36 mph) (gas turbine); 21 knots (39 km/h; 24 mph) (diesel only)
- Range: 4,100 nmi (7,600 km; 4,700 mi) at 18 knots (33 km/h; 21 mph)
- Complement: 173; 22 officers, 151 enlisted
- Sensors & processing systems: Signaal MW08 air search radar; Signaal DA08 air surface radar; 2 Signaal STIR fire control radar; Racal Decca 2690 BT navigation radar; Raytheon SQS-56/DE 1160 hull-mounted and VDS sonar; SLQ-25 Nixie torpedo decoy; Mk XII Mod 4 IFF radar; 2 Signaal Mk 73 Mod 1 radar for ESSM; Signaal STACOS Mod 2 combat data system; SAR-8 IR searcher
- Electronic warfare & decoys: Argo AR 700 ESM system; Telegon 10 ESM system; Argo APECS II ECM system; 4 SCLAR decoy launchers
- Armament: 1× Mk 45 Mod 2A 5" gun, 2× Mk15 Phalanx 20 mm CIWS, 2 Mk141 2×4 Harpoon missile launchers, Mk 48 Mod 2 vertical launcher for 16× RIM-162 ESSM, 2 Mk32 Mod 5 2×324mm T/T for Mk46 torpedoes
- Aviation facilities: Hangar for 1 Sikorsky S-70B-6 Aegean Hawk helicopter

The Hydra class are a group of four frigates in service with the Hellenic Navy. They were designed in Germany and are part of the MEKO group of modular warships, in this case the MEKO 200 design. The programme was authorised in 1988 and partially paid for with FMS aid and provisioned for the commission of six vessels. The first ship was built in Germany and commissioned in 1992 the rest of built in Greece but suffered a serious fire while working up near Portland, England. Repairs were completed in 1993. The Greek built warships were delayed due to financial problems on the part of the Hellenic Shipyards completing in the late 1990s which also led to limiting the total number of vessels to four mainly after the acquisition of eight Kortenaer-class frigates from the Netherlands in the late 1990s.

== Upgrade programs ==
In 2007, an upgrade of the STIR fire control system to allow the firing of the RIM-162 ESSM surface-to-air missile was launched. Salamis was the first to be upgraded and, in August 2008, successfully completed a live firing test. The other three Hydra vessels were upgraded during 2008.

On 25 April 2018 the Greek defense minister Panos Kammenos announced that the modernization of the four vessels is in progress but without presenting any further details about the program.

In May 2019, the Joint Chiefs of General Staff Council (ΣΑΓΕ) decided the commencement of the modernization program for the four ships of the class. The program was finally approved by the Greek Parliament in April 2023. However, the basic contracts for new on board systems were signed with Thales Group, a Greek company and a Greek shipyard only between May and July 2026.

== Ships ==
Ship	Namesake	Builder	Commissioned	Status
F-452 Hydra Ύδρα	Hydra	Blohm + Voss	12 November 1992	In service
F-453 Spetsai Σπέτσαι	Spetses	Hellenic Shipyards	24 October 1996	In service
F-454 Psara Ψαρά	Psara	Hellenic Shipyards	30 April 1998	In service
F-455 Salamis Σαλαμίς	Salamis	Hellenic Shipyards	16 December 1998	In service

== Gallery ==
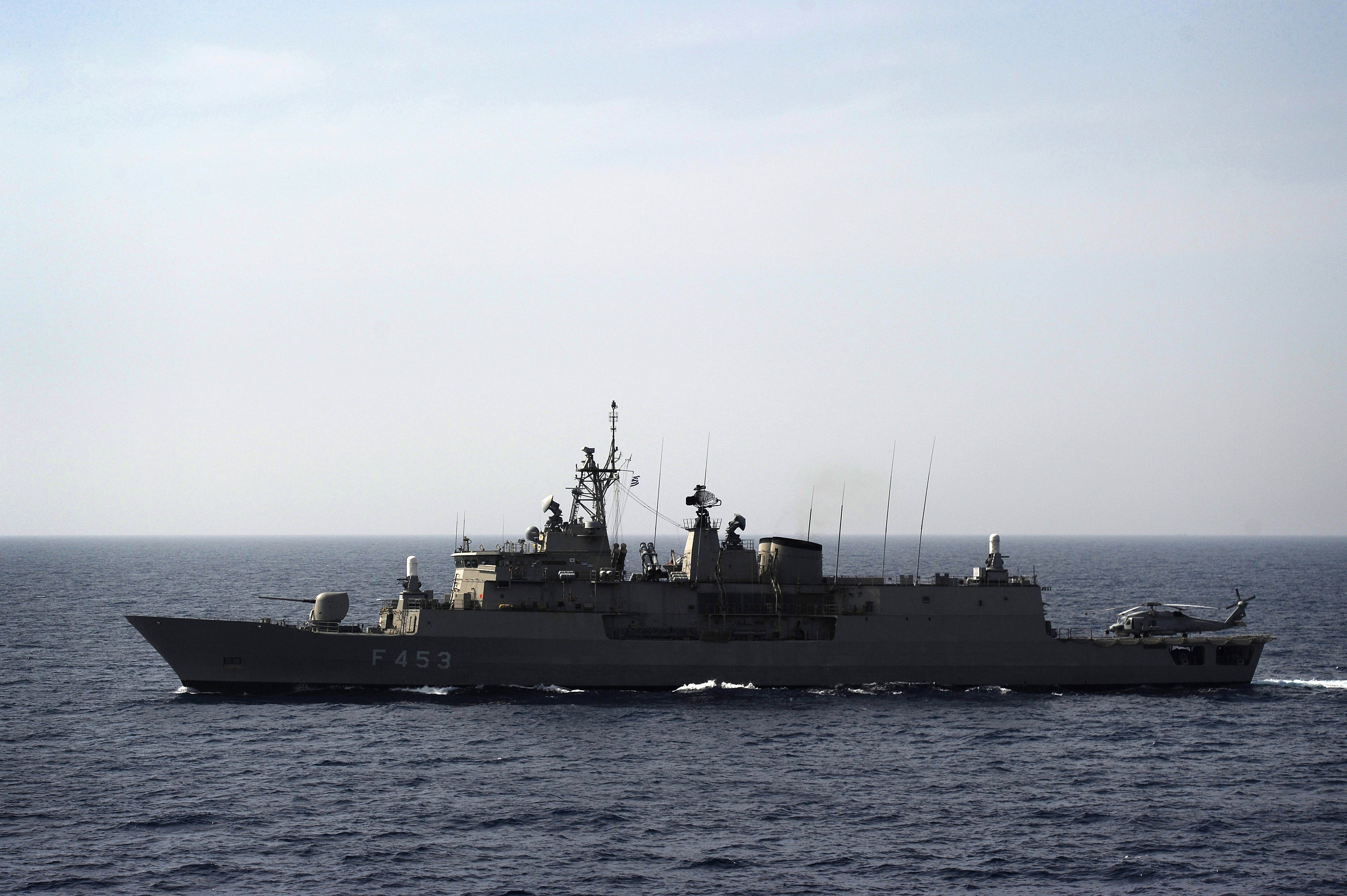
HS Spetsai transits alongside the Military Sealift Command container and roll-on-roll-off ship USNS LCPL Roy M. Wheat

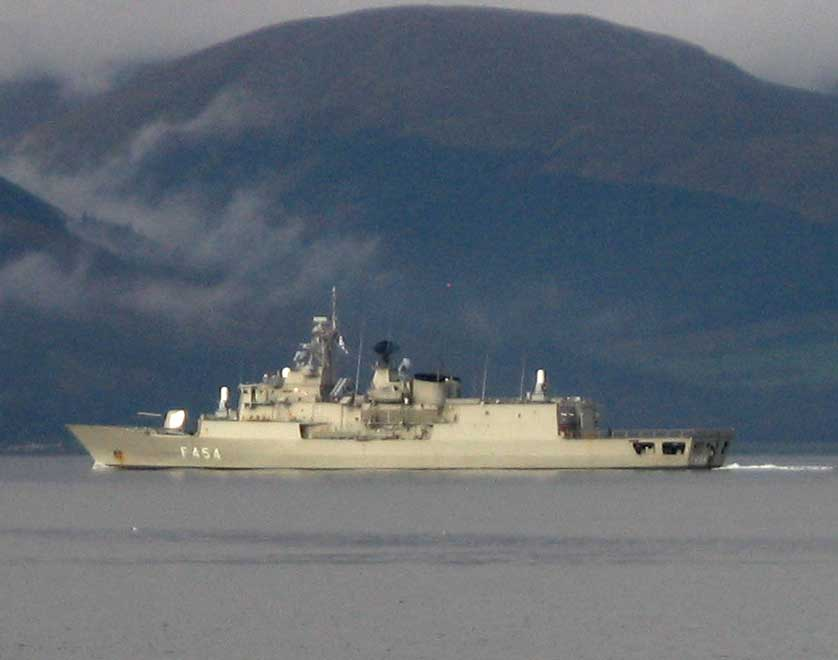
HS Psara

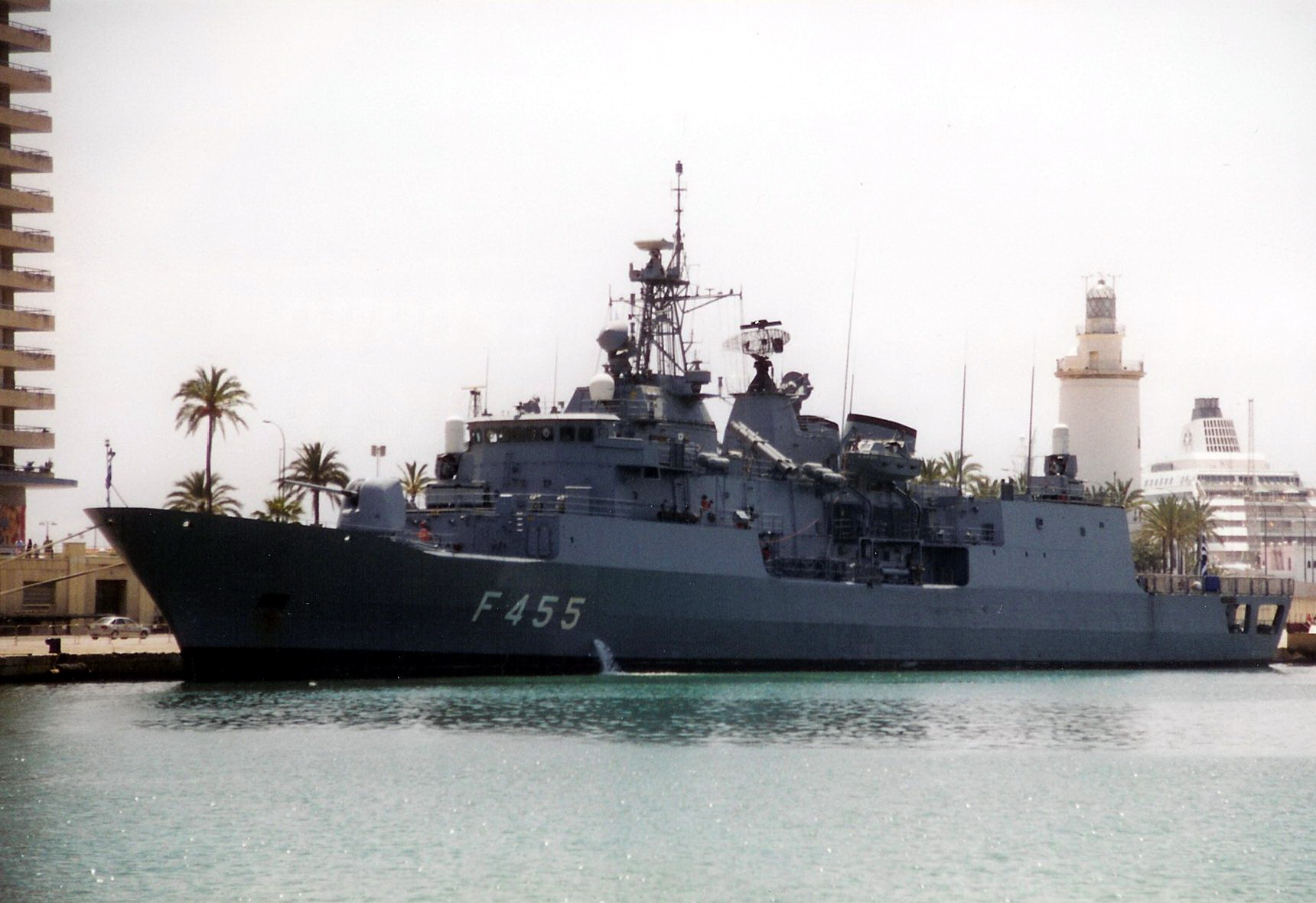
HS Salamis

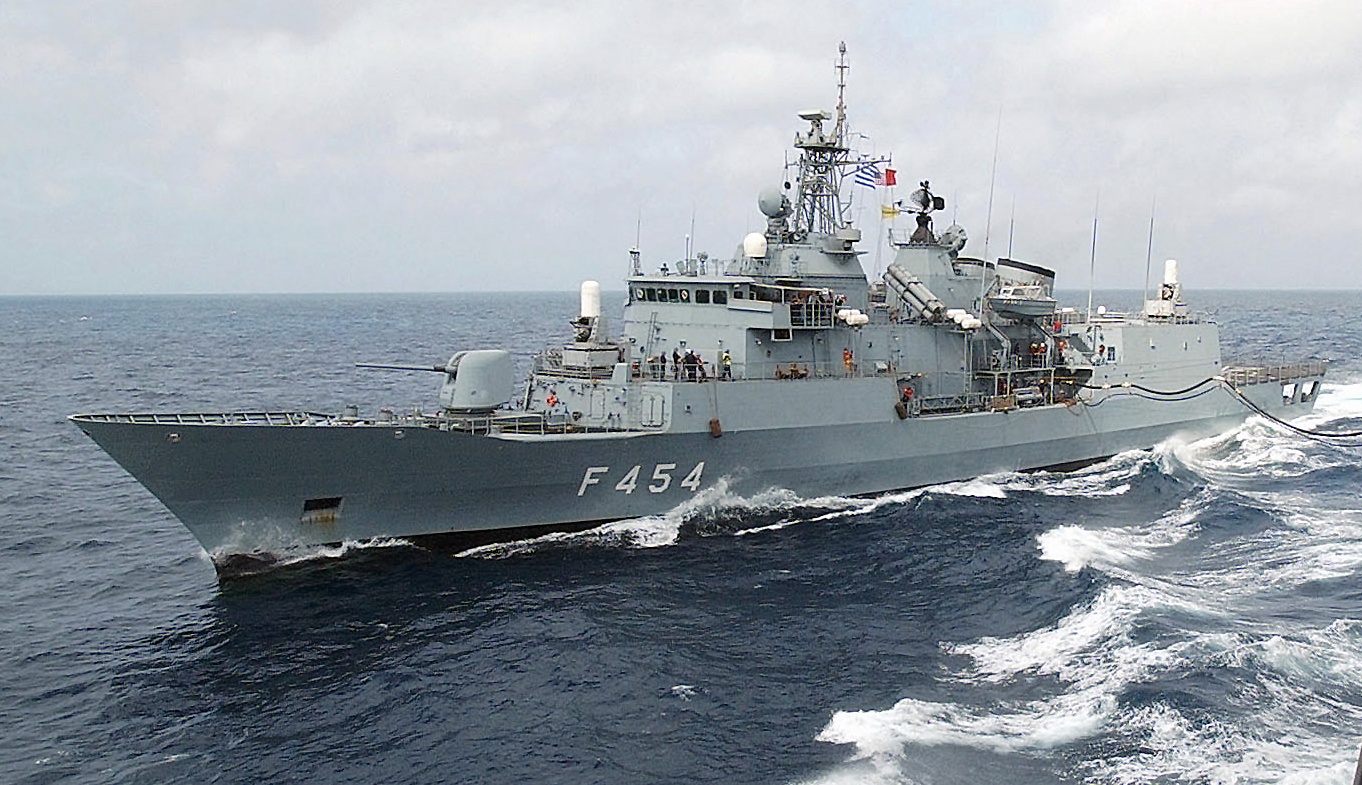
A view from USS Seattle, showing HS Psara underway conducting a replenishment at sea in 2002

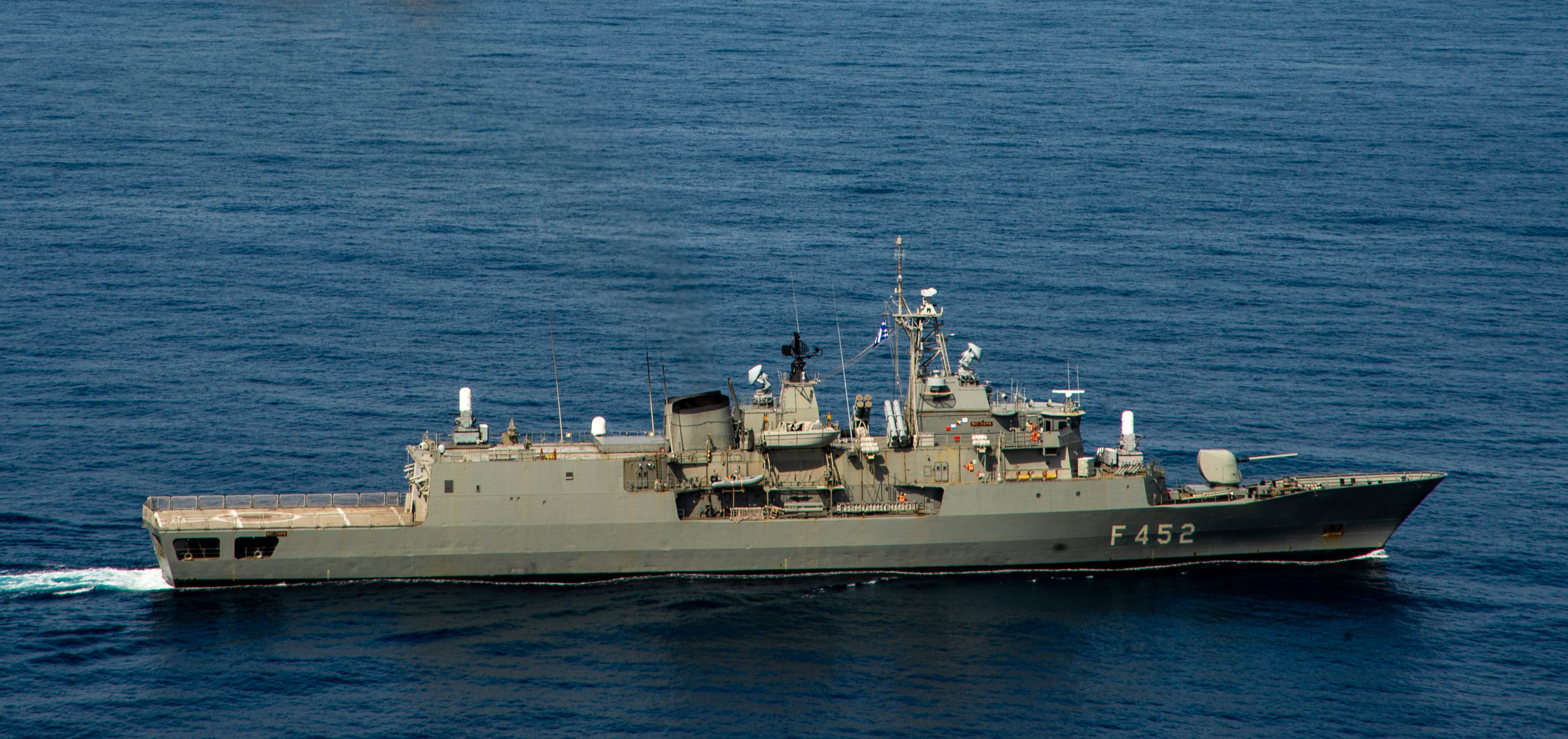
HS Hydra in 2022

== See also ==
- List of frigate classes in service

Equivalent frigates of the same era

- Brahmaputra class
- La Fayette class
- Type 053H3
- Barbaros class
- Lekiu class

== Sources ==
- Conway's All the World's Fighting Ships 1947-1995
- Hellenic Navy website
