= Skaramagas =

Skaramagas Σκαραμαγκάς
- Settlement
- Location within Greece
- Coordinates: 38°0.6′N 23°36′E
- Country: Greece
- Administrative region: Attica
- Regional unit: West Athens
- Municipality: Chaidari

Population (2021)
  - Total: 1,064
- Time zone: UTC+2 (EET)
  - Summer (DST): UTC+3 (EEST)
- Postal code: 124 62
- Area code: 210
- Vehicle registration: Z

Skaramagas (also spelled Skaramangas; Greek: Σκαραμαγκάς) is a port in the western part of the Athens agglomeration, Greece. It is part of the municipality of Haidari and is divided into three main neighborhoods, Ano Afaia, Kato Afaia and the coastal zone. It is known for its eponymous shipyard. It took its name from the Chiot merchant family, the Skaramagas.

== Geography ==
Skaramagas is situated on the east coast of the Bay of Elefsina, a bay of the Saronic Gulf. The Aigaleo mountain to the east separates it from the rest of Athens. Skaramagas is 5 km west of Chaidari town centre, 6 km south of Aspropyrgos, 7 km southeast of Elefsina, and 11 km west of Athens city centre. Greek National Road 8 (the old Athens - Corinth - Patras road) passes through Skaramagas.

== Shipyard ==
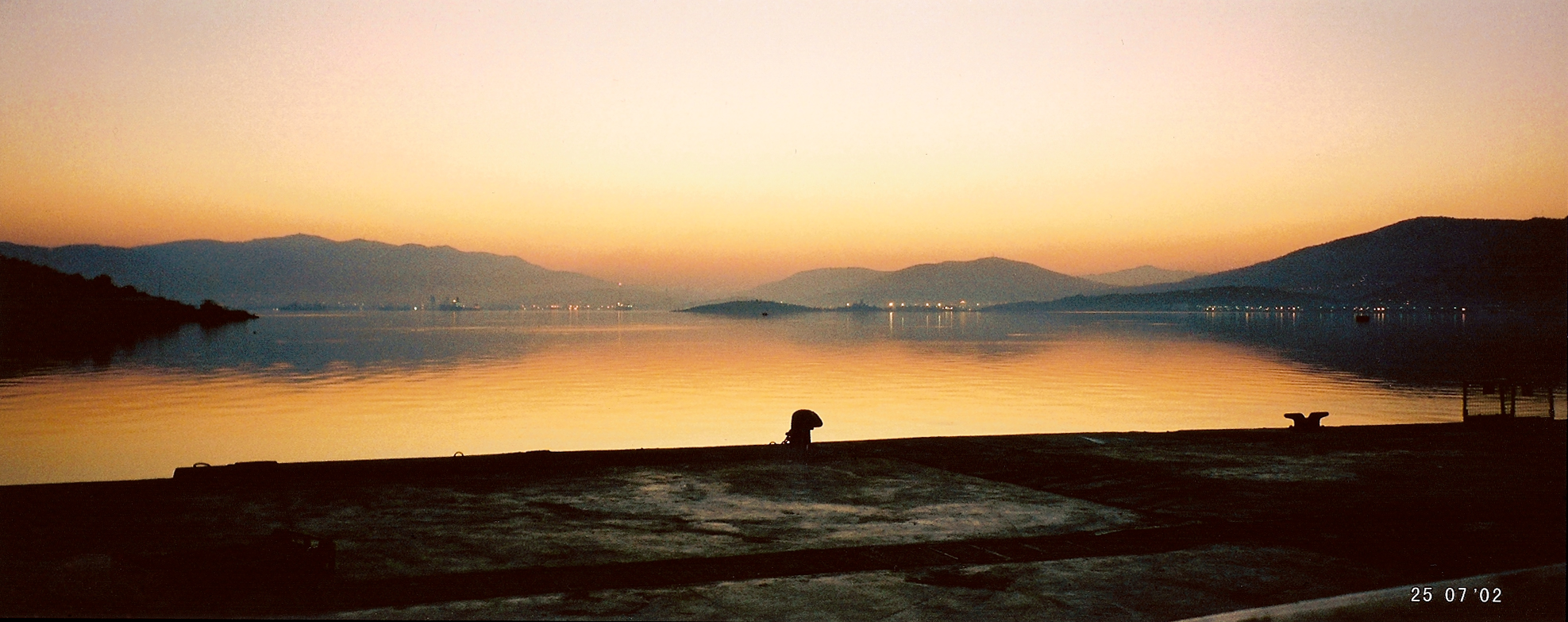
Skaramagas from Salamina

Since 1937 Skaramagas harbour has been home to a shipyard of the Hellenic Navy. After destruction in World War II, it was refounded as a commercial shipyard in 1957, the Hellenic Shipyards Co. In 2002, the port became entirely owned by a German group of investors under the industrial leadership of Howaldtswerke-Deutsche Werft, which became a subsidiary of ThyssenKrupp in 2005.

In 1973, the Skaramagas harbour was the scene of an experiment carried out by Greek scientist Ioannis Sakkas, to test whether or not it was possible for Archimedes to use focused sunlight as a "heat ray" to burn Roman ships during the Siege of Syracuse (214–212 BC). This event is mentioned in ancient accounts but often doubted by modern historians. In the 1973 experiment at Skaramagas harbour, 70 mirrors with a copper coating, such as were available in Archimedes' time, did focus enough sunlight to set on fire a plywood mock-up of a Roman warship at a distance of around 50 metres (160 ft).

== Historical population ==
Historical population
Year	Pop.	±%
1991	2,309	—
2001	968	−58.1%
2011	1,255	+29.6%
2021	1,064	−15.2%
