= Skaramangas Shipyards =

Greek shipyard

Skaramangas Shipyards single member S.A.
- Company type: Single member S.A.
- Industry: Shipbuilding
- Founded: 1937/1957
- Founder: Stavros Niarchos
- Headquarters: Skaramagas, Greece
- Products: Ships, submarines, railcars
- Owner: George Prokopiou (100%)
- Number of employees: 1,300 (2009)
- Website: skaramangas.gr

Skaramangas Shipyards S.A., formerly Hellenic Shipyards S.A., is a large shipyard in Skaramagas, in West Athens regional unit, Greece, founded in 1937 as a warship building company.

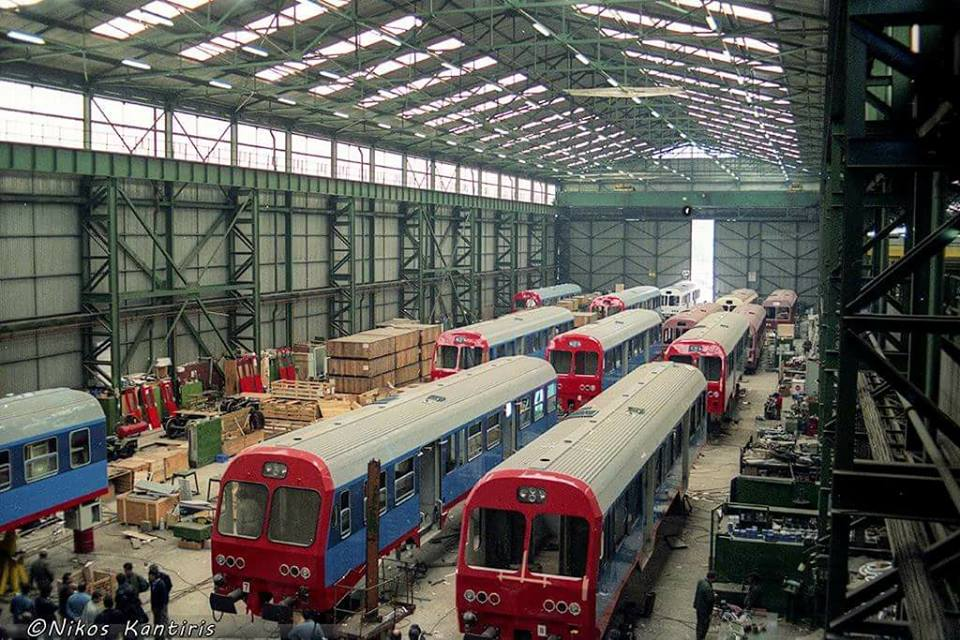
Diesel multiple units being built under licence from MAN at the Hellenic Shipyards in 1991

== History ==
Commonly known as "Skaramanga Shipyards" (Greek: Ναυπηγεία Σκαραμαγκά), from the area where they are located, its origins are connected with the Royal Hellenic Naval Shipyard created in 1937 in order to build warships. Despite heavy investment and an order of 12 destroyers and a number of submarines (of which 2 destroyers were in initial stages of construction), development ceased due to the Second World War while in 1944 the facilities were virtually destroyed by Allied bombing. Operation started in 1957 when Greek business tycoon Stavros Niarchos purchased the ruined shipyard and rebuilt and expanded its facilities; since then the company has built many civilian and military ships.

Military constructions include Greek-designed fast patrol boats and gunboats, as well as frigates, fast attack crafts, submarines, etc. based on French or German designs. A company division is involved in metal and machinery constructions, including specialized constructions for the Greek industry, structures and platforms for offshore drilling, cranes, etc. A special branch has also been created since 1986, for the mass production of various types of railcars (diesel and electric) and railroad cars (passenger and freight), mostly on German designs.

The company was bought in 2002 by a group of German investors under the industrial leadership of the German shipyard Howaldtswerke-Deutsche Werft (HDW), later a subsidiary of the German ThyssenKrupp Marine Systems. However, serious yard mismanagement by the German TKMS group has caused a decline of the shipyard, and reduction of employees to 1,300 in 2009 (from about 6,200 in 1975).

On March 1, 2010, an agreement was reached to sell 75.1% of the company to Abu Dhabi Mar. On April 12, 2023, transfer of 100% of the company to Milina Enterprises Company Limited, owned by George Prokopiou, was completed.

== Ships built by Skaramangas Shipyards ==
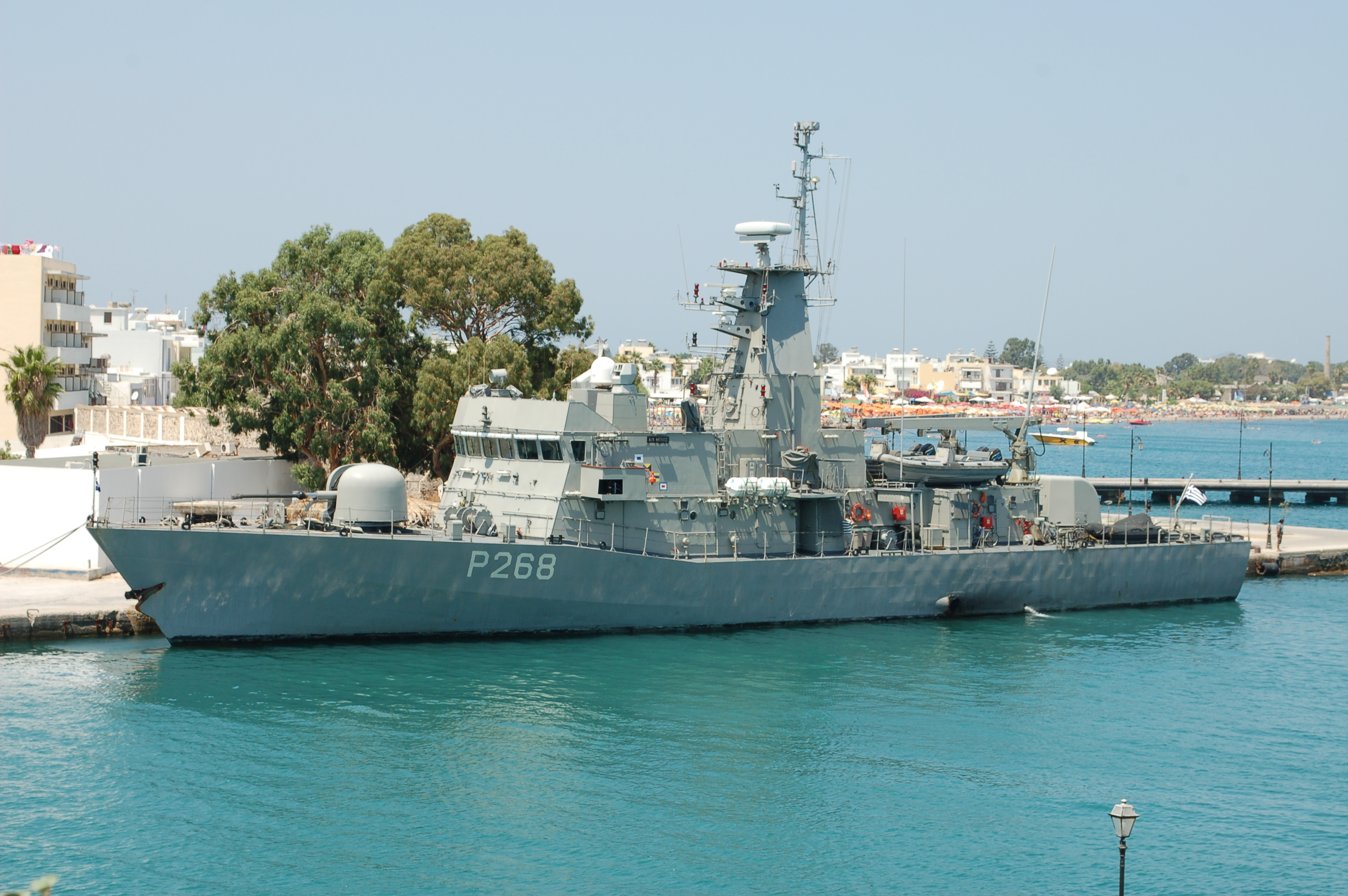
Gunboat HS Aittitos P-268 (Ospray HSY-56A class)

Several ship types, commercial (general cargo, bulk carriers, tankers, tugboats, super yachts, ferries and other passenger ships) and military, among which:

- La Combattante IIIb-class fast attack craft
- HSY-55-class gunboat
- Osprey HSY-56A-class gunboat
- Meko-200HN (built under license by parent company HDW)
- Type 214 submarines (built under license by parent company HDW)

== Ships repaired at Skaramangas Shipyards ==
Thousands of ships, among which:

- HS Tombazis (D-215) - repaired between November 1978 and May 1979
- Brittany (ex-Bretagne), a Chandris Lines cruise ship that was accidentally destroyed by fire in April 1963 as repairs neared completion
