= Naval Aviation Command =

Naval Aviation Command can refer to:

- Argentine Naval Aviation
- Navy Aviation Command of Greece
- Republic of China Naval Aviation Command
