= Aegean Sea Naval Command =

- Ναυτική Διοίκηση Αιγαίου (ΝΔΑ)
- Active: 1935–1941, 1944–present
- Country: Greece
- Allegiance: Hellenic Armed Forces
- Branch: Hellenic Navy
- Type: Naval defence area
- Role: Supervision and Control over the Aegean Sea Naval Stations' Observatories
- Garrison/HQ: Piraeus

Commanders
- Current commander: Commodore Ilias Raptis

Aegean Sea Naval Command (Greek: Ναυτική Διοίκηση Αιγαίου, ΝΔΑ), formerly the Southern Aegean Naval Command (Ναυτική Διοίκηση Νοτίου Αιγαίου, ΝΔΝΑ), is a regional command of the Hellenic Navy covering the eastern coasts of mainland Greece and most of the Aegean Sea and the Aegean islands.

== Mission ==
It is one of the three regional naval commands under the Fleet Headquarters (Αρχηγείο Στόλου). It is headquartered in Piraeus, and its area of responsibility extends over most of the Aegean Sea, except for a line from the northern limits of Mount Pelion to the mouth of the river Evros, which falls under the Northern Greece Naval Command in Thessaloniki. Its mission is described as "maritime surveillance, coastal defence, and the control and coordination of the Coast Guard and other state organs and services for the ensuring of national defence and security from the sea".

== History ==
The first attempts at organizing Greece's coastal defence came in 1926, but only in 1935 was a concrete institutional framework established, when six Naval Defence Areas were established. One of them, Naval Defence Area 3 (Ναυτική Αμυντική Περιοχή 3, ΝΑΠ/3) was established at Piraeus with responsibility over the southern Aegean Sea. In August 1944, with the imminent liberation of Greece from Axis occupation, the Southern Aegean Naval Command was established at Alexandria, based on the cruiser Averof. Following the return of the Greek fleet and the Greek government-in-exile to Greece in October 1944 (Operation Manna), the command moved to the Vatis Mansion, then (25 January 1945) to the Piraeus Town Hall building, to the vehicle carrier Pineios (15 March 1949), before finally acquiring its present headquarters in the Hatzikyriakeio neighbourhood of Piraeus on 1 August 1951.

In 1976, following the Turkish invasion of Cyprus and the emergent threat of war with Turkey, the boundaries of the naval commands were redefined: the Southern Aegean Naval Command took over responsibility for most of the Aegean, the likely battleground between the Greek and Turkish navies, and the Northern Aegean Naval Command was limited to the coasts of northern Greece and renamed accordingly.
