= Hellenic Navy =

Maritime warfare branch of Greece's military

- Ελληνικό Πολεμικό Ναυτικό
- Hellenic Navy seal
- Founded: 1821 (de facto); 1828 (official)
- Country: Greece
- Role: National defense
- Size: c. 30,000 active personnel 180 warships & auxiliary boats, including: 14 frigates 10 submarines 15 missile boats 10 gunboats 9 tank-landing ships 6 patrol boats 7 SOC (Special Ops); 48 fleet support & other auxiliary ships 3 memorial ships 27 aircraft
- Part of: Hellenic Armed Forces
- Garrison/HQ: Athens
- Patron: St. Nicholas
- Mottos: Μέγα τὸ τῆς θαλάσσης κράτος "Great is the nation that controls the sea"
- Colors: Blue, white & gold
- March: "The Aegean Sailor"
- Engagements: Greek War of Independence; Greco-Turkish War (1897); Balkan Wars; World War I Russian Civil War; Greco-Turkish War (1919–1922); World War II; Operation Golden Fleece; UNIFIL; Operation Desert Storm; Operation Desert Shield; Operation Sharp Guard; Operation Enduring Freedom; Operation Active Endeavour; Operation IFITOS; Operation Atalanta; Operation Ocean Shield; 2011 military intervention in Libya; Operation Aginor; War on terror Operation Irini; Operation Prosperity Guardian; Operation Aspides; 2026 Iranian strikes on Cyprus
- Website: Hellenic Navy

Commanders
- Chief of the Navy General Staff: Vice Admiral; Dimitrios E. Kataras
- Notable commanders: Admiral; Andreas Miaoulis; Admiral; Konstantinos Kanaris; Admiral; Pavlos Kountouriotis; Vice Admiral; Ioannis Demestichas

Insignia
- Identification symbol: ΠΝ
- Naval ensign

- Naval jack

- Pennant

The Hellenic Navy (HN; Greek: Πολεμικό Ναυτικό, romanized: Polemikó Naftikó, lit. 'War Navy', abbreviated ΠΝ) is the naval force of Greece and one of three branches of the Hellenic Armed Forces where they use the prefix HS (Hellenic ship).

The modern Greek navy historically hails from the naval forces of various Aegean Islands that fought in the Greek War of Independence. During the monarchic period (1833–1924 and 1936–1973), it was known as the Royal Hellenic Navy (Βασιλικόν Ναυτικόν, Vasilikón Naftikón, abbreviated ΒΝ).

The Hellenic Navy is a green-water navy. The total displacement of the fleet is approximately 150,000 tons. The HN also operates a number of naval aviation units.

The motto of the Hellenic Navy roughly translates to "Great is the nation that controls the sea", from Thucydides' account of Pericles' oration on the eve of the Peloponnesian War. The Hellenic Navy's emblem consists of an anchor in front of a crossed Christian cross and trident, with the cross symbolizing Greek Orthodoxy, and the trident symbolizing Poseidon, the god of the sea in Greek mythology. The motto is written across the top of the emblem.

== History ==
The history of the Hellenic Navy begins with the birth of modern Greece, and due to the maritime nature of the country, it has always featured prominently in modern Greece's military history.

=== The Navy during the Revolution (1821–1830) ===
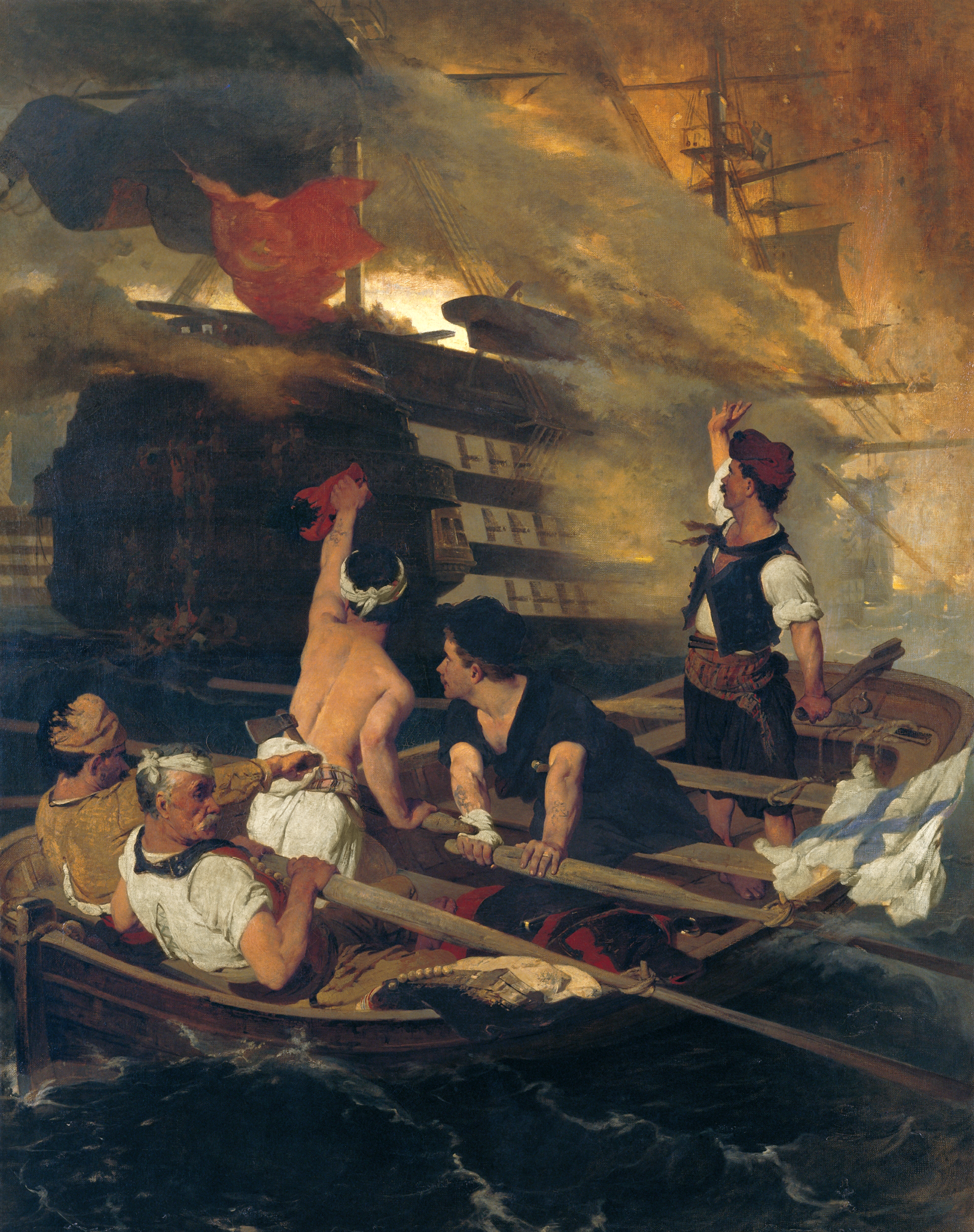
The destruction of the Ottoman flagship at Chios by Konstantinos Kanaris. Painting by Nikiphoros Lytras.

At the beginning of the Greek War of Independence, the naval forces of the Greeks consisted primarily of the merchant fleet of the Saronic islanders from Hydra, Spetsai and Poros and also the islanders of Psara and Samos. The fleet was of crucial importance to the success of the revolution. Its goal was to prevent as much as possible the Ottoman Navy from resupplying the isolated Ottoman garrisons and land reinforcements from the Ottoman Empire's Asian provinces.

Although Greek crews were experienced seamen, the light Greek ships, mostly armed merchantmen, were unable to stand up to the large Ottoman ships of the line in direct combat. So the Greeks conducted the equivalent of modern-day naval special operations, resorting to the use of fireships (Greek: πυρπολικά or μπουρλότα), with great success. It was in the use of such ships that courageous seamen like Konstantinos Kanaris won international renown. Under the leadership of capable admirals, most prominently Andreas Miaoulis from Hydra, the Greek fleet achieved early victories, guaranteeing the survival of the revolution in the mainland.

However, as Greeks became embroiled in civil wars, the Sultan called upon his strongest subject, Muhammad Ali of Egypt, for aid. Plagued by internal strife and financial difficulties in keeping the fleet in constant readiness, the Greeks failed to prevent the capture and destruction of Kasos and Psara in 1824, or the landing of the Egyptian army at Modon. Despite victories at Samos and Gerontas, the Revolution was threatened with collapse until the intervention of the Great Powers in the Battle of Navarino in 1827. There the Egypto-Ottoman fleet was decisively defeated by the combined fleets of the Britain, France and the Russian Empire, effectively securing the independence of Greece.

When Ioannis Capodistrias became governor of newly liberated Greece in 1828, the Greek fleet consisted of few remaining ships, which had participated in the war for independence. The first minister of "Naval affairs" was Konstantinos Kanaris, and the most powerful ship of the fleet at that time, the frigate Hellas, had been constructed in the United States in 1825. The Hellenic Navy established its headquarters at the island of Poros and the building of a new series of ships began at the naval base, while old ships were gradually being retired. Furthermore, continuous efforts towards the education of officers were initiated. Young people were initially trained at the military school of Scholi Evelpidon and afterwards they were transferred to the navy, as there was no such thing as a Naval Academy.

In 1831, Greece descended into anarchy with numerous areas, including Mani and Hydra, in revolt. It was during this revolt that the flagship Hellas, docked at Poros, was set on fire by Admiral Andreas Miaoulis. Capodistrias was assassinated a few months after.

=== The Royal Hellenic Navy of King Otto (1830–1860) ===
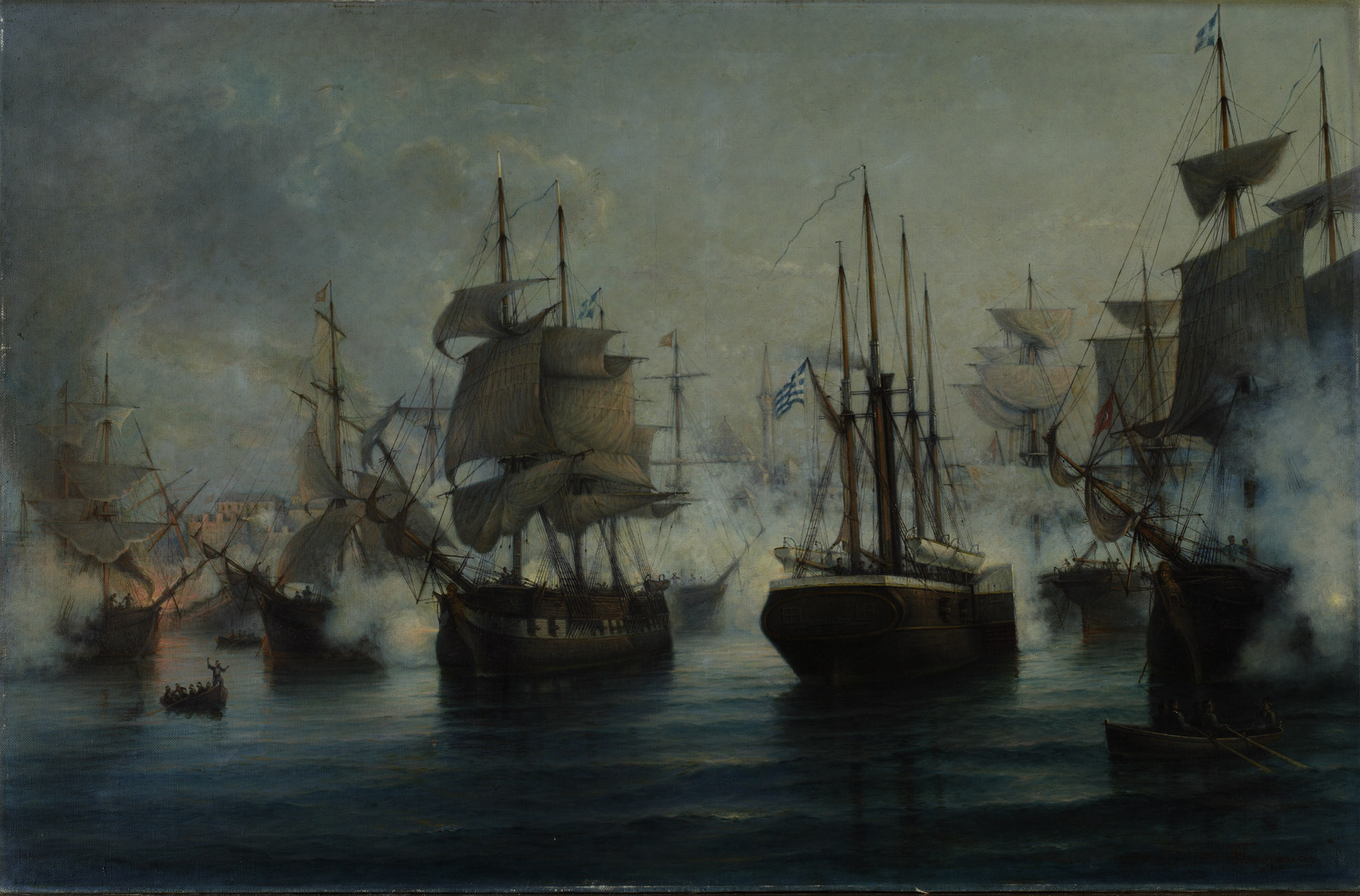
The Greek fleet in the Battle of Itea by Yiannis Poulakas

When the new King Otto arrived in the Greek capital, Nafplion, in 1832 aboard the British warship HMS Madagascar, the Greek fleet consisted of one corvette, three brigs, six schooners, two gunboats, two steamboats and a few more small vessels. The first naval school was founded in 1846 on the corvette Loudovikos and Leonidas Palaskas was assigned as its director. However, the inefficient training of the officers, coupled with conflict between those who pursued modernization and those who were stalwarts of the traditions of the veterans of the struggle for independence, resulted in a restricted and inefficient navy, which was limited to policing the sea and the pursuit of pirates.

During the 1850s, the more progressive elements of the navy won out and the fleet was augmented with more ships. In 1855, the first iron propeller-driven ships were ordered from England. These were the steamships Panopi, Pliksavra, Afroessa, and Sfendoni.

=== Growth of the Navy under King George (1860–1910) ===
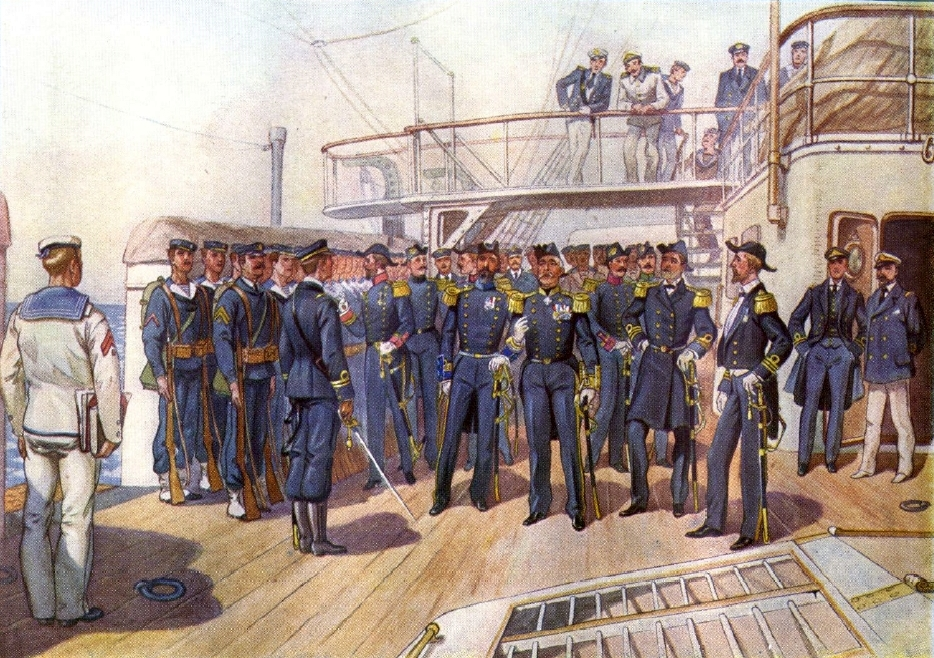
Navy uniforms in the 1890s

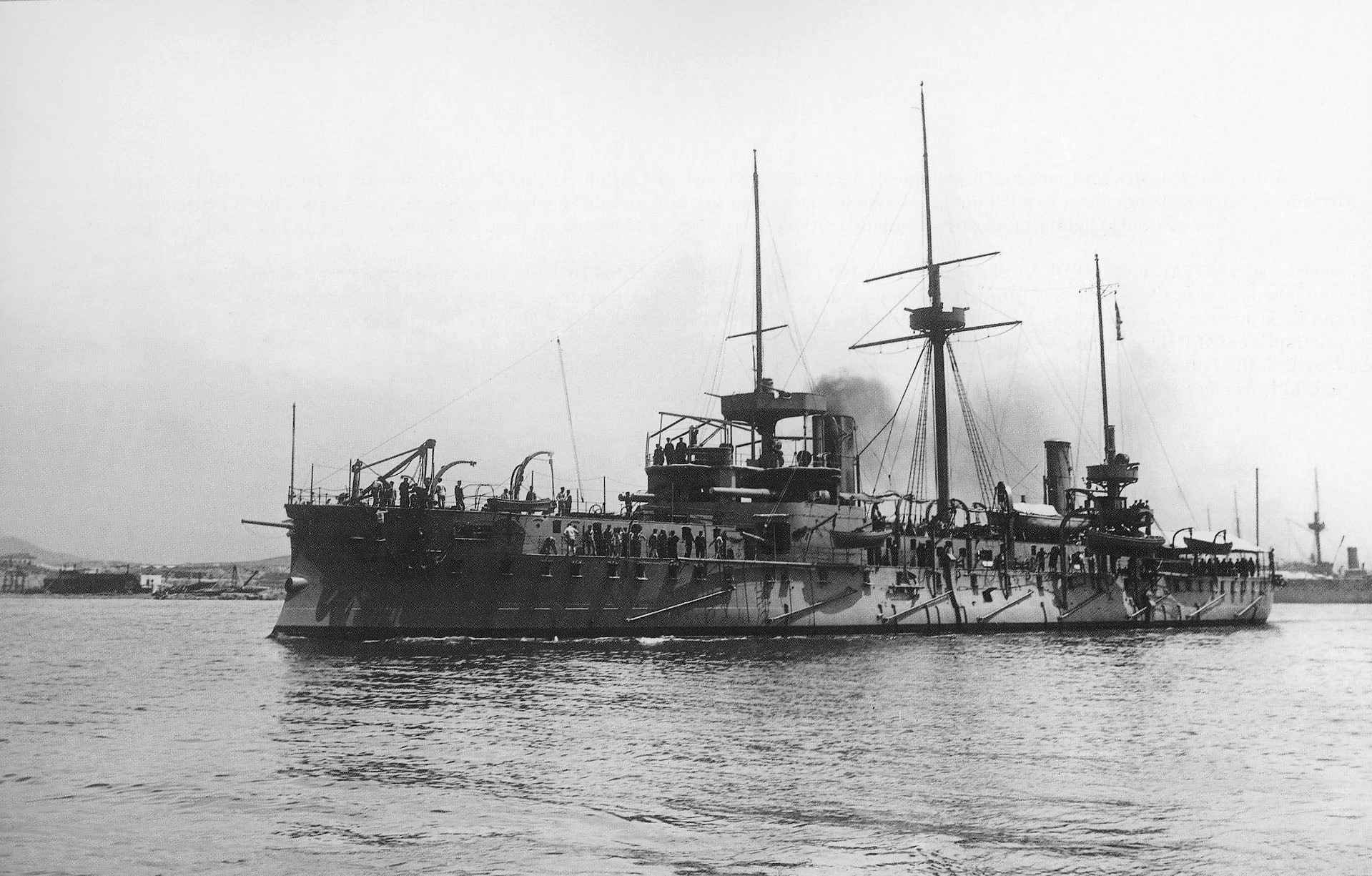
Battleship Psara

On 29 October 1863, following an enthronement ceremony in his native Copenhagen and a tour of several of the European capitals, Prince Wilhelm of Denmark arrived aboard the Greek flagship Hellas, to take up the throne as King George I of Greece. During the 1866 Cretan revolt, the Royal Hellenic Navy ships were in no condition to support it. Such failure led to the government awakening to the problem of naval insufficiency and the adoption of a policy stating that: "The navy, as it represents a necessary weapon for Greece, should only be created for war and aim to victory." Because of this, the fleet was supplied with new and bigger ships, reflecting a number of innovations including the use of iron in shipbuilding industry and the invention of the torpedo; with these advances, the effectiveness and the appearance of the Hellenic Navy changed.

Meanwhile, after 1878, because of the Russo-Turkish War and the need to expand the Greek navy, a new and larger naval base was established in the area of Faneromeni of Salamis and a few years later it was transferred to the area of Arapis where it remains today. At the same time the Naval Academy was founded and Ilias Kanellopoulos was made Director. A French naval mission, headed by Admiral Laurent Joseph Lejeune, introduced a new, advanced naval organization and the methodological training of enlisted personnel through the establishment of a training school in the old building of the naval base in Poros. During the government of Charilaos Trikoupis in 1889, the fleet was further increased with the acquisition of new battleships: Hydra, Spetsai, and Psara from France. Thus, when Greece went to war in the Greco-Turkish War in 1897, the Hellenic Navy established its dominance in the Aegean Sea. However, it was unable to change the outcome of the war on land, which was a national humiliation.

In 1907, the Hellenic Navy General Staff (Γενικό Επιτελείο Ναυτικού) was founded, with then-Captain Pavlos Kountouriotis as its first head. After the war, in 1897, the Ottoman Empire embarked on a program of naval expansion for its fleet and as a response to that, in 1909, the cruiser Georgios Averof was bought from Italy. In 1910, a British naval mission arrived, headed by Admiral Lionel Grant Tufnell, in order to recommend improvements in the organization and training of the navy. The mission led to the adoption of the British style of management, organization and training, especially in the area of strategy.

=== Balkan Wars (1912–1913) ===
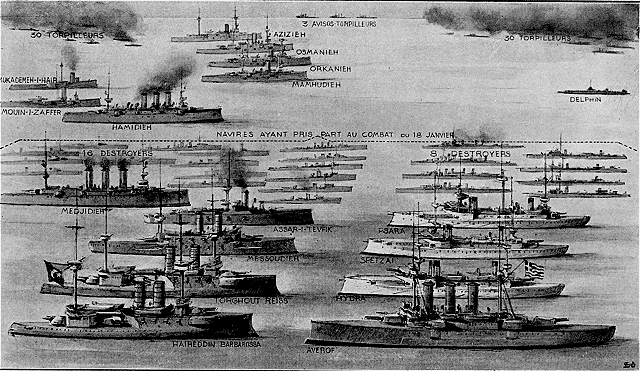
Diagram by the French L'Illustration, depicting the opposed Greek and Ottoman fleets in the Battle of Lemnos

Shortly before the Balkan Wars, the Navy was composed of a fleet of destroyers and battleships. Its mission was primarily offensive, aiming to capture the Ottoman-held islands of the Eastern Aegean and establish naval supremacy. To that end, its commander-in-chief, Rear Admiral Pavlos Kountouriotis, established a forward base at the Moudros bay at Lemnos, directly opposite the Dardanelles straits. After defeating the two Turkish sallies from the Straits at Elli (December 1912) and Lemnos (January 1913), the Aegean Sea was secured for Greece.

The Balkan Wars were followed by a rapid escalation in 1914 between Greece and the Ottoman Empire over the status of the islands of the eastern Aegean. Both governments embarked on a naval armaments race, with Greece purchasing the battleships Lemnos and Kilkis and the light cruiser Elli as well as ordering two dreadnoughts, Vasilefs Konstantinos and Salamis and a number of destroyers. However, with the outbreak of the First World War, construction of the dreadnoughts stopped.

=== World War I and aftermath (1914–1935) ===
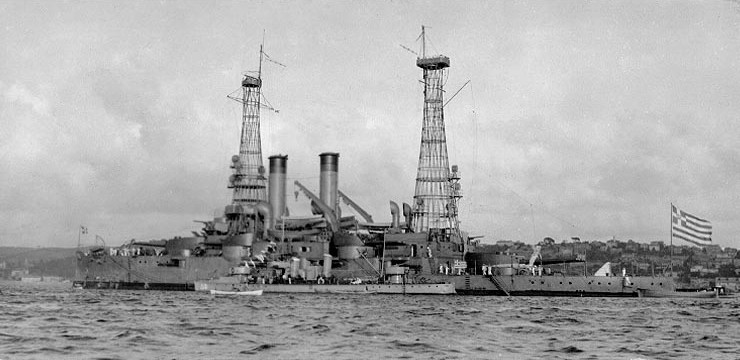
Greek battleship Lemnos and torpedo boat Dafni during the occupation of Constantinople, 1919

Initially during the war, Greece followed a course of neutrality, with the Prime Minister Eleftherios Venizelos favouring the Entente and pro-German King Constantine I advocating neutrality. This dispute eventually led to a deep political conflict, known as the "National Schism". In November 1916, in order to apply pressure on the royal government in Athens, the French confiscated the Greek ships. They continued to operate with French crews, primarily in convoy escort and patrol duties in the Aegean, until Greece entered the war on the side of the Allies in June 1917, at which point they were returned to Greece. Subsequently, the Navy took part in the Allied operations in the Aegean, in the Allied expedition in support of Denikin's White Armies in Ukraine, and in limited operations during the Greco-Turkish War of 1919–1922 in Asia Minor.

After Greece's defeat, the 1920s and early 1930s were a politically turbulent period, with the economy in a bad state, so the Navy received no new units, apart from the modernization of four destroyers and the acquisition of six French submarines in 1927 and four Italian destroyers in 1929.

=== World War II (1939–1945) ===
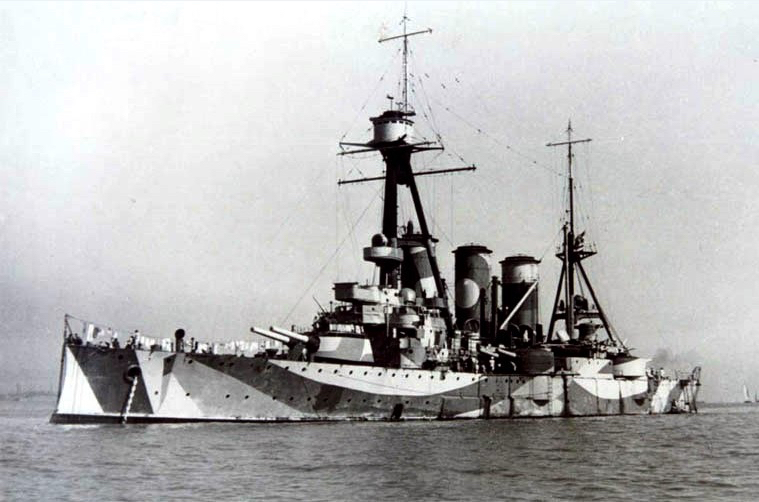
HS Georgios Averof (nicknamed Uncle George) in camouflage paint, RN Bombay Station, 1942, while serving under UK Royal Navy command

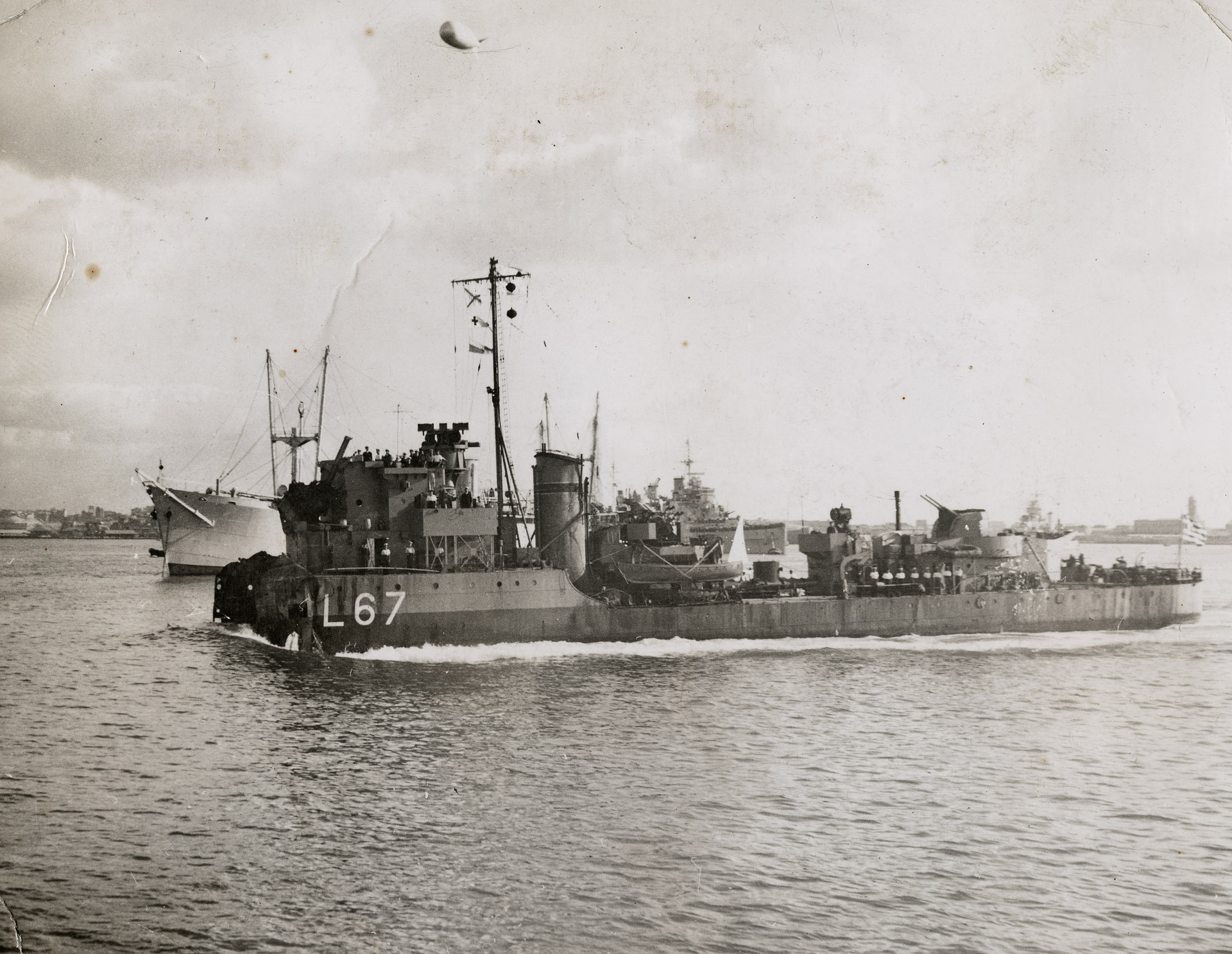
Destroyer Adrias (L67) sailing to Alexandria with her bow missing, 1943

In 1938, Greece ordered four modern Greyhound-class destroyers in British shipyards, making a serious step towards modernization. The outbreak of war in Europe, however, allowed only two to be delivered. Greece entered World War II with a navy consisting of two battleships, one armoured cruiser, one protected cruiser, fourteen destroyers, and six submarines.

During the Greco-Italian War, the Navy took over convoy escort missions in the Ionian Sea and even embarked on three raids against the Italian supply convoys in the Strait of Otranto, although without success. The most important role was given to the submarines, which although obsolete, sank some Italian cargo ships in the Adriatic, losing one submarine in the process. The Greek submarine force (six boats) was however too small to be able to seriously hinder the supply lines between Italy and Albania (between 28 October 1940 and 30 April 1941, Italian ships made 3,305 voyages across the Otranto straits, carrying 487,089 military personnel, including 22 field divisions, and 584,392 tons of supplies while losing overall only seven merchant ships and one escort ship).

When Nazi Germany attacked Greece, the RHN suffered heavily at the hands of the Luftwaffe, with 25 ships, including the old battleship, now artillery training ship, Kilkis and the hulk of her sister Lemnos, lost within a few days in April 1941. It was then decided to shift the remaining fleet (one cruiser – the famous Georgios Averof – three destroyers and five submarines) to join up with the British Mediterranean Fleet at Alexandria.

As the war progressed, the number of Hellenic Royal Navy vessels increased after the concession of several destroyers and submarines by the British Royal Navy. The most notable aspects of the Hellenic Royal Navy's participation in World War II include the operations of the destroyer Vasilissa Olga which, until sunk in Leros on 23 September 1943, was the most successful Allied destroyer in the Mediterranean Sea; the participation of two destroyers in Operation Overlord; and the story of the destroyer Adrias, which while operating close to the coast of Kalymnos in October 1943 hit a mine, resulting in the loss of the vessel's prow, while blowing the two-gun forward turret over the bridge. After some minor repairs at Gümüşlük Bay in Turkey Adrias managed to return to Alexandria in a 400-mile (640 km) trip, even though all the forepart of the ship, up to the bridge, was missing.

=== Post-war era (1945–1980) ===
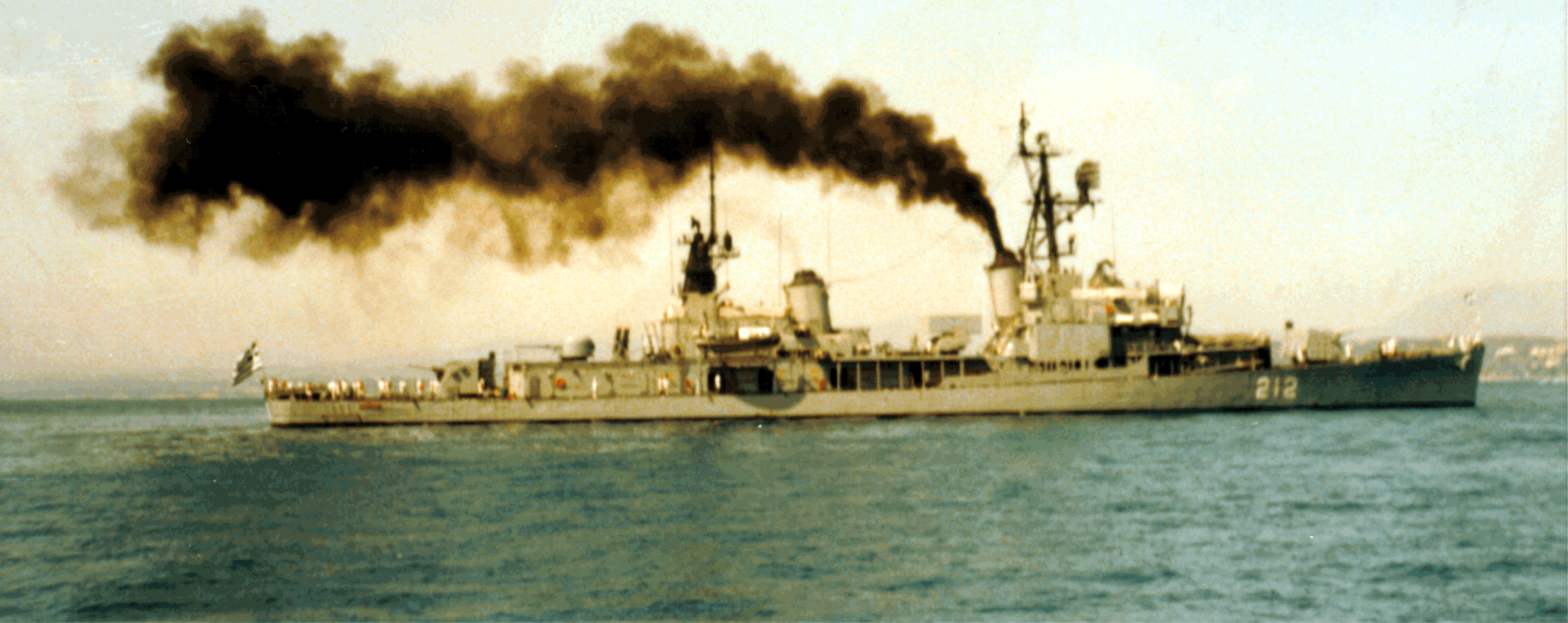
The destroyer Kanaris (D212), a few weeks before decommission

After World War II, the Royal Hellenic Navy was significantly strengthened by the concession of British and Italian ships. The organisation also changed in line with modern naval doctrines of that era after the entrance into NATO in 1952. At the beginning of the 1950s, US military aid formed the core of the country's armed forces. The Royal Hellenic Navy received the first Bostwick-class destroyers which took on the name Beasts (Θηρία), while withdrawing the British ones.

The next significant change was during the early 1970s, when Greece was the first Mediterranean naval force to order missile-equipped fast attack craft (Combattante II) and the Type 209 submarines, whereas US military aid continued in the form of FRAM II type destroyers. In 1979, the Hellenic Navy placed an order in the Netherlands for two modern Standard-class frigates (the Elli class). These were the first acquisitions of new main surface vessels, rather than the use of second-hand ships, in almost four decades.

=== Modern era (1980–2024) ===
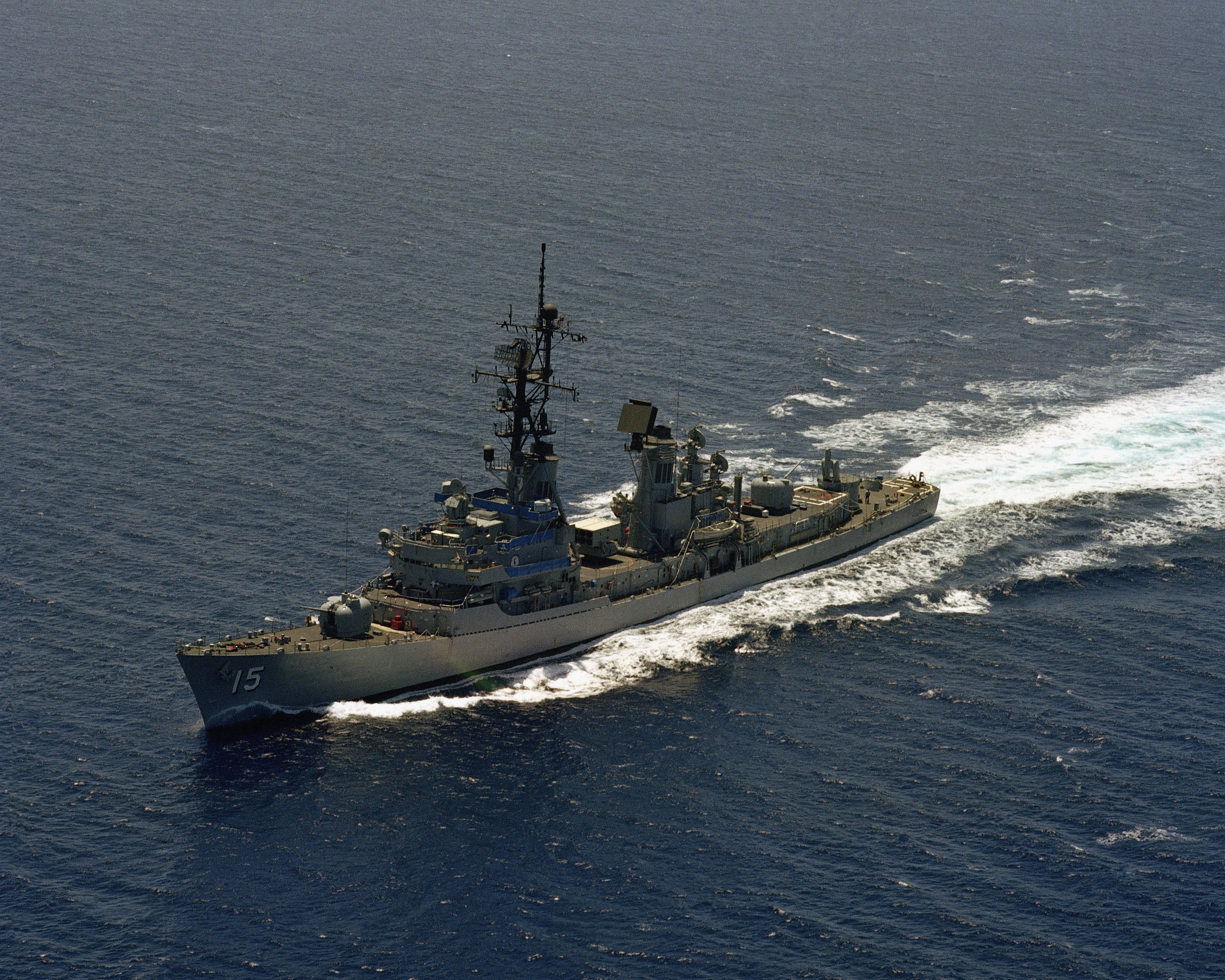
The Charles F. Adams-destroyer USS Berkeley in 1984, later in Greek service as HS Themistocles (D221)

The arrivals of Hydra-class, and more Standard-class frigates, along with the orders for more missile corvettes, Poseidon-class submarines, and naval helicopters allowed for the retirement any obsolete vessels. Greece also received four Charles F. Adams-class destroyers from the US Navy in 1991–1992. All four were decommissioned after only ten years in service, since their electronics and armament eventually became obsolete, and they required large crews. Greece ordered Type 214 submarines that feature an air-independent propulsion (AIP) system, Sikorsky S-70B-6/10 Aegean Hawk helicopters, and Project 1232.2 Zubr-class hovercraft from Russia & Ukraine. Later actions included the modernization of Standard-class frigates with new electronics & radar systems, and the modernization of Glaukos-class and Poseidon-class submarines with new sonars, electronics & air-independent propulsion engines (programs Neptune I/II).

In March 2026, the Hellenic Navy deployed two Frigates in order to help the Cypriot National Guard to defend Cyprus against incoming threats.

== Fleet overview ==
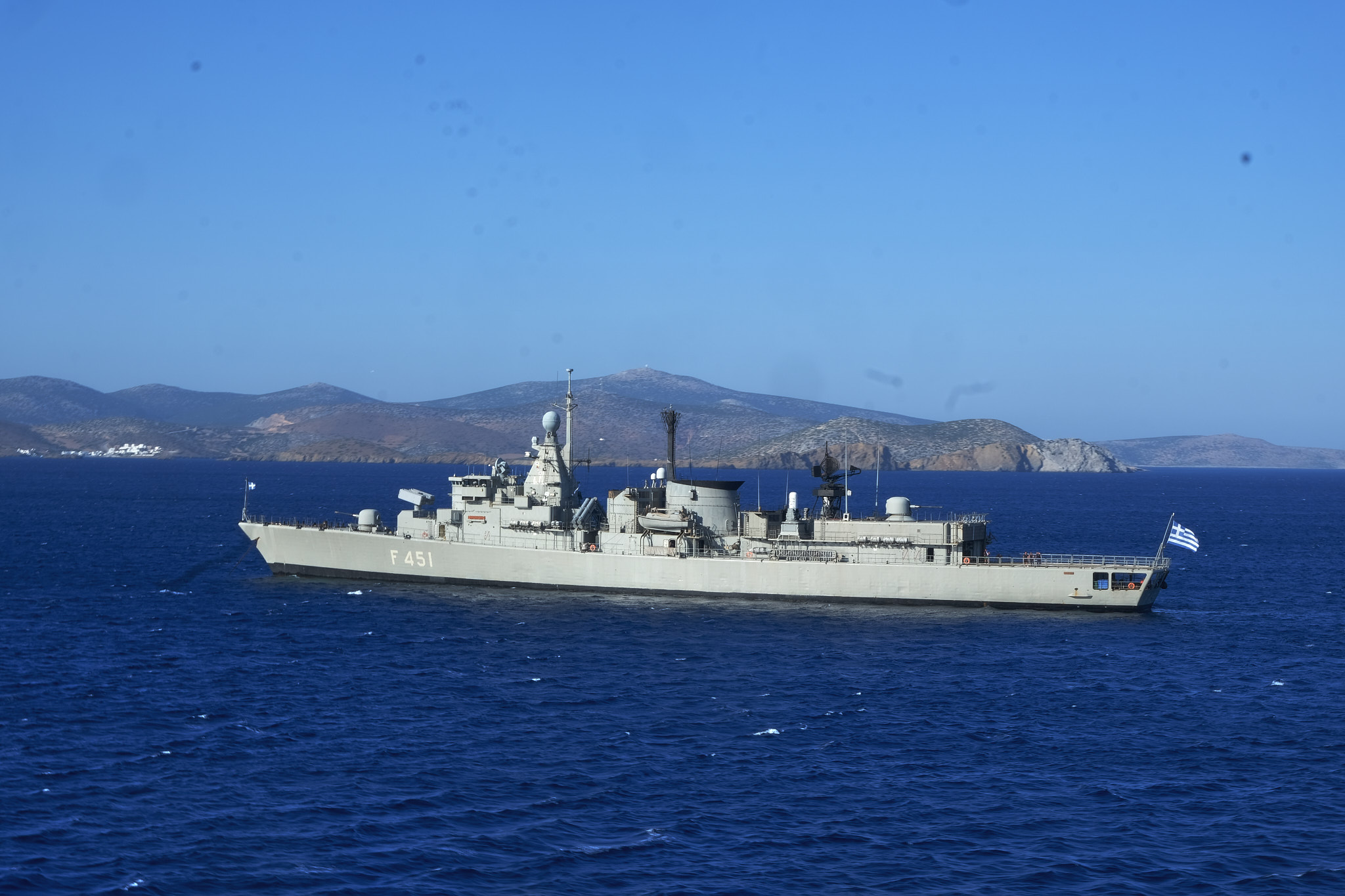
Greek military ship in Astypalea

The Hellenic Navy maintains a large number of surface vessels and submarines in its inventory. However, the vast majority of warships in active service are in the process of either being replaced by more modern and advanced designs, being refurbished, or being retired. The Navy is awaiting delivery of three FDI Belharra frigates from France with an option for one more after the Greek Prime Minister announced the purchase from Greece of four new multirole heavy frigates in September 2020, that will replace older Elli class vessels. Deliberations with other parties, including the United States and Germany, lasted for months after France was eventually awarded the contract. He also announced the immediate upgrade of all four Hydra (Meko-200HN) class frigates, already in service. Greece has also signed on to a program between Italy and France in making a new multirole heavy corvette, with Spain joining as well. The program, dubbed the European Patrol Corvette, has also been inserted in the EU's so-called Permanent Structured Cooperation. Naviris expected the EU fund to issue a Request for Proposal for projects in 2020, with proposals to then be submitted by industry in 2021, and for decisions on fund allocation to be made the same year. Also, plans for the Hellenic Navy to acquire the Sa'ar 72 Israeli corvette of the new Themistocles class came to fruition after an agreement signed in June 2020, with exclusive production in Greece.

=== Frigates and heavy corvettes ===
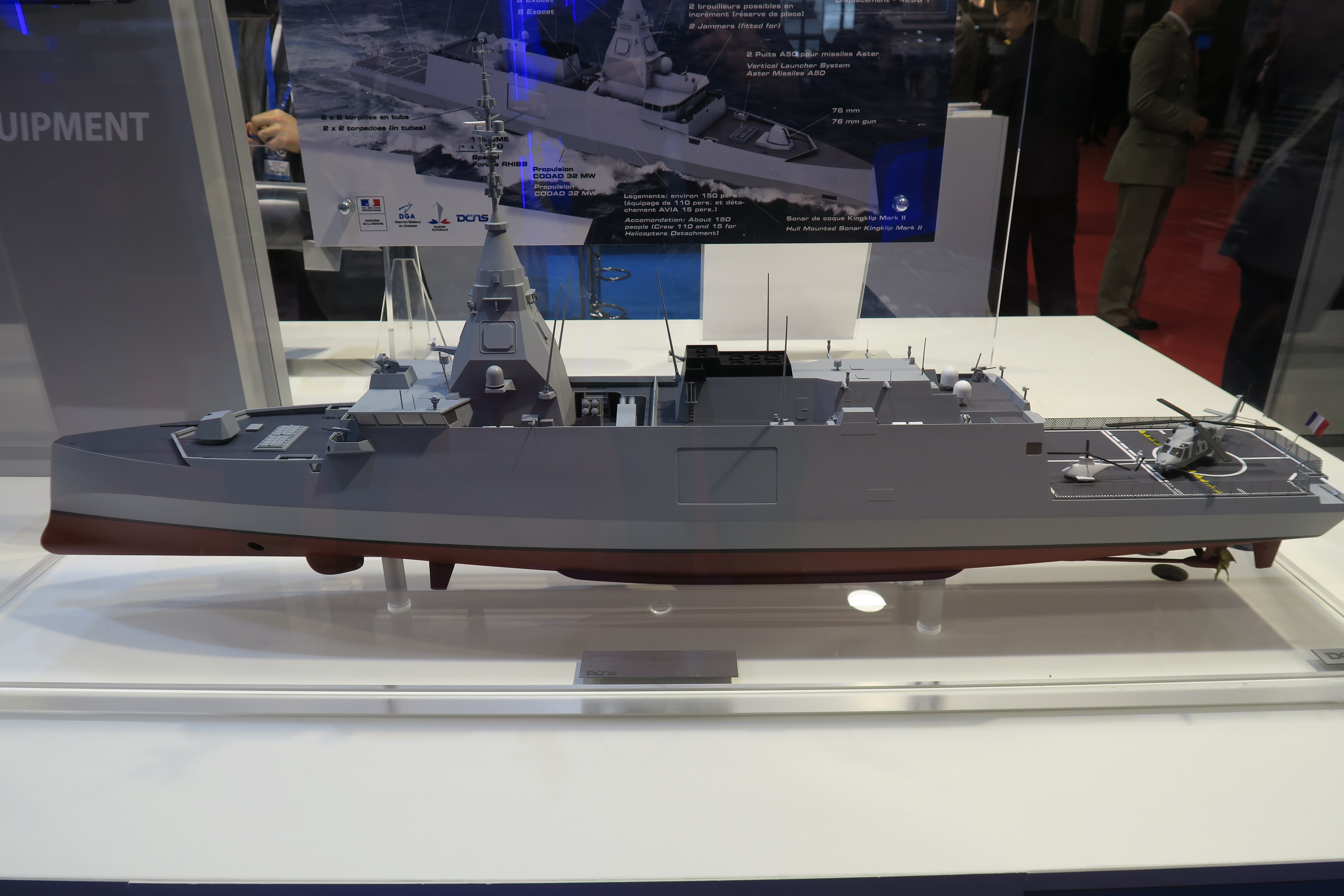
Scale model of the FTI Belharra, revealed at the 2016 Euronaval exhibition and proposed by France.

Frigates are the main heavy ships of the Navy, with 70% of the Hydra class frigates having an advanced anti-aircraft missile launching system. However, there is no dedicated anti-aircraft warfare (AAW) platform in the fleet since the Charles F. Adams class destroyers were decommissioned in the late 90s. The oldest ship in the frigate fleet is over 45 years old (HS Kountouriotis, commissioned in 1978) while the youngest ship is over 1 years old ( HS Kimon commissioned in 2026). Plan for the Hydras is to extend their operational lifespan well into the 2030s. However, the Elli class frigates need to be replaced by new designs.

The acquisition of two, with an option for two more, Naval Group FDI Belharra frigates with high-end AAW and deep missile strike (DMS utilising Scalp EG Naval) capabilities from France was put on hold in July 2020, despite an intense interest initially expressed by the Navy. Main reasons for this policy change by the Greek Government, were reported to be the increased cost of almost €3 billion for only two units, the exclusion by the French of co-production and the delayed delivery of the first unit, placing it in 2025 at the earliest. Meanwhile, the United States had proposed the acquisition of four Multi-Mission Surface Combatants (Freedom class MMSCs), also known as Littoral combat ships, that are already in full production for Saudi Arabia, also tested and in use by the US Navy. The Germans came to the table with the Meko-A200 design, a new and advanced version of the Meko-200HN, that could additionally offer homogeneity to the fleet, especially after the upgrade of the ships already in service.

On 6 November 2020, the Navy submitted its initial preference for the acquisition of 4 MMSC Littoral Combat Ships developed by Lockheed Martin. These multi-mission frigates were part of a wider package discussed with the US, that also included upgrade of the four Hydra frigates, intermediate solution ships, and participation of Hellenic Shipyards in the development of the new American FFG(X) type frigate. The FFG(X) type frigate, now named Constellation-class frigate, is a multi-mission guided-missile ship, under development for the United States Navy by Fincantieri Marinette Marine. However all other proposals, also including those from the Netherlands, the UK, Spain and Italy, remained on the table pending closest evaluation of the packages offered by all participating companies. The final decision by the Greek Government on the type and country of origin of the new Hellenic ships, was scheduled for 2021.

Final decision was made on 28 September 2021 and after many months of deliberations. During his visit to the French capital and his meeting with President Emmanuel Macron, Greek Prime Minister Kyriakos Mitsotakis announced the procurement of 3+1 French FDI-HN Frigates and 3+1 Gowind-HN class Corvettes in a €5 billion deal spreading to 2026, with the later class still being configured to meet the Hellenic Navy's needs.

It is almost certain that two types will replace the Ellis, in order to maintain a ceiling of at least ten frigates/corvettes. A floating scenario was the purchase of heavy corvettes to replace a number of old Ellis. This scenario has become increasingly more possible, after Greece joined Italy and France in the European Patrol Corvette (EPC/PESCO) consortium in early 2020 for the construction of a new advanced 3,000 ton corvette, with Spain joining the program as well. New ships, for all involved Navies, are not likely to enter service before 2027 or 2030 at the earliest.

=== Submarines ===
Greece maintains a mixed fleet of modern and older submarine units. In December 2019, the Hellenic Ministry of Defence resolved a lingering issue, regarding the new Type-214 (Papanikolis class) torpedoes. An order for new multipurpose heavyweight SeaHake Mod4 torpedoes, from Atlas Elektronik, was placed. The contract also included the upgrade of older torpedoes and the purchase of new torpedo batteries. The six older and non-modernized Type-209 units (Poseidon and Glavkos classes) will be gradually retired, without any replacement announced yet. The optimistic scenario is replacement with four additional Type-214s, reaching a ceiling of eight units of this type. By 2030, the recently upgraded Type-209/1500 AIP (HS Okeanos, former Type-209/1200) will have exceeded 50 years since entering service; therefore it is questionable whether it will still be part of the Greek fleet by that time.

=== Other surface combatants ===
There were two new Roussen class Fast Attack Missile Craft (FAMC) under construction, bringing the number of vessels of this type up to seven; The 6th ship was commissioned operational in July 2020, with the seventh and final ship expected Autumn 2020. This was after a more than ten-year delay due to financial and structural problems faced by Elefsis Shipyard that was contracted to build the ships. There are no changes in the initial design, despite 20 years since the first vessel in the class entered service. The majority of the FAC were built in the late '70s. Four of them have been modernised extensively and the new ships have integrated all updates. All older vessels of other types, with the exemption of three Votsis class boats which are about to be retired soon with the introduction of the new Roussens, have replaced their old MM38 and Penguin missile systems with Harpoon launchers. In addition, the boats that had no electro-optical tracking (Mirador) sensors, received new endogenous Miltech TDR-10A and TDR-300 systems.

The fleet also consists of ten gunboats. With the exception of the four Machitis class (Osprey HSY-56A), the rest of the gunboats need modernization and, some of them, replacement. The two Asheville class boats are at least 50 years old. The remaining four boats (Osprey-55 and HSY-56) have already received new electro-optical systems. On 16 June 2020, ONEX Neorion Shipyards SA in the Greek island of Syros and Israel Shipyards LTD signed a cooperation agreement for the construction of the Themistocles class corvette during Greek PM's visit to Israel. This is a multipurpose warship based on the Israeli Sa'ar 72-class corvette design, at 72 meters length and displacement of around 800 tons. It will be able of speeds above 30 knots with an extended endurance. It can operate a medium size marine helicopter, but also supports unique possibilities of deploying Special Forces units. The agreement was for the construction in Greece of seven vessels, with an option for six more. These will replace an equal number of older gunboats.

In February 2020, at a special event held at the Hellenic Institute of Naval Technology (HINT), the technical director of the Unit of Submersibles and Hellenic Navy Works of Hellenic Shipyards Co., presented project Aginor. The project was the development and construction, in collaboration with the Navy, of an advanced Asymmetric Warfare Vessel (AWV) that uses the latest technologies and composite materials. The first vessels have already been added to the Navy's fleet. They are capable of a number of missions including insertion and extraction of Special Operations Forces, interdiction and coastal patrol, as well as search and rescue (SAR) operations.

In April 2020 the Navy received the first four Mark V Special Operations Craft, ordered via the United States Excess Defense Articles programme. The craft are utilised by the Underwater Demolition Command.

=== Aircraft ===
In 2019, the U.S. State Department cleared a $600 million foreign military sale (FMS) of seven MH-60R Seahawk multi-mission helicopters to Greece. In July 2020, Greece signed a contract for the purchase of four new units, via this program. In November of the same year, the remaining three aircraft were also included in the order. A decision was made in 2014 for the re-activation of existing Lockheed P-3B Orions and their submission to a program of overhaul, upgrade and service life extension. The contract with Lockheed Martin included the return of one aircraft to airworthy condition with the existing mission equipment as an "interim solution" and the complete modernization and upgrade of four other aircraft in Hellenic Aerospace (HAI). The option included the complete modernization and upgrade of that aircraft as well. The "interim solution" aircraft has already been delivered, while all the remaining aircraft are expected to be delivered by 2023.

The Hellenic Navy will soon begin the use of Schiebel Camcopter S-100. This unmanned helicopter is able to take-off and land on warships and will be deployed on FDI frigates. 4 systems (8 vehicles) were ordered in February 2026.

== Chain of command ==
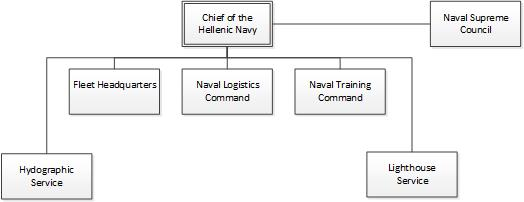

=== Main commands ===
Greek	English translation	Location
Γενικόν Επιτελείον Ναυτικού (ΓΕΝ)	Hellenic Navy General Staff	Athens
Αρχηγείον Στόλου (ΑΣ)	Fleet Headquarters	Salamis Island
Ναυτική Διοίκηση Αιγαίου (ΝΔΑ)	Aegean Sea Naval Command	Piraeus
Ναυτική Διοίκηση Ιονίου (ΝΔΙ)	Ionian Sea Naval Command	Patras
Ναυτική Διοίκηση Βορείου Ελλάδος (ΝΔΒΕ)	Northern Greece Naval Command	Thessaloniki
Διοίκηση Ναυτικής Εκπαίδευσης (ΔΝΕ)	Naval Training Command	Skaramagas
Διοίκηση Διοικητικής Μέριμνας (ΔΔΜΝ)	Logistics Command	Athens
Διοίκηση Αεροπορίας Ναυτικού (ΔΑΝ)	Navy Aviation Command	Grammatiko
Ναύσταθμος Κρήτης	Crete Naval Base	Souda Bay, Chania
Ναύσταθμος Σαλαμίνας	Salamis Naval Base	Salamis Island
Υδρογραφική Υπηρεσία	Hydrographic Service	Athens
Υπηρεσία Φάρων	Lighthouse Command	Piraeus

=== Combat arms ===
- Διοίκηση Φρεγατών (ΔΦΓ) Frigate Command
- Διοίκηση Πλοίων Επιτηρήσεως (ΔΠΕ) Surveillance Ships Command, formerly Διοίκηση Κανονιοφόρων (ΔΚΦ) Gunboat Command
- Διοίκηση Ταχέων Σκαφών (ΔΤΣ) Fast Attack Craft Command
- Διοίκηση Υποβρυχίων (ΔΥ) Submarine Command
- Διοίκηση Αμφιβίων Δυνάμεων (ΔΑΔ) Amphibious Assault Forces Command
  - Greece does not have a marine corps established as a separate branch attached to the naval service. Instead, the Army includes the 32nd Marine Brigade (32η Ταξιαρχία Πεζοναυτών); the Navy provides the landing craft etc.
- Διοίκηση Υποβρυχίων Καταστροφών (ΔΥΚ) Underwater Demolition Command
- Διοίκηση Αεροπορίας Ναυτικού (ΔΑΝ) Navy Aviation Command
  - 1η Μοίρα Ελικοπτέρων Ναυτικού (ΜΕΝ 1) 1st Navy Helicopter Squadron (AB-212 ASW), 112th Combat Wing, Elefsis, 38°08′31″N 23°57′03″E
  - 2η Μοίρα Ελικοπτέρων Ναυτικού (ΜΕΝ 2) 2nd Navy Helicopter Squadron (S-70B Aegean Hawk), 112th Combat Wing, Elefsis, 38°08′31″N 23°57′03″E
  - Μοίρα Αεροσκαφών Ναυτικού (ΜΑΝ) Navy Aircraft Squadron, 112th Combat Wing, Elefsis, currently with no active aircraft. 38°04′13″N 23°33′56″E
  - Ελικοσταθμός Αμφιάλης = Amfiali Heliport 37°59′30″N 23°34′28″E

=== Combat support arms ===
- Διοίκηση Ναρκοπολέμου (ΔΝΑΡ) Minesweeper Command

=== Combat service support ===
- Σχολή Εξάσκησης Ναυτικής Τακτικής (ΣΕΝΤ) Naval Tactical Training School (under Fleet Headquarters)

== Equipment ==
=== Ships ===
The Hellenic Navy's fleet of warships and auxiliary boats is harboured in the two major HN naval bases at Salamis Island near Piraeus and at Souda Bay on the island of Crete. Internationally, the Navy used the prefix HS (Hellenic Ship) for its vessels.

==== Frigates ====
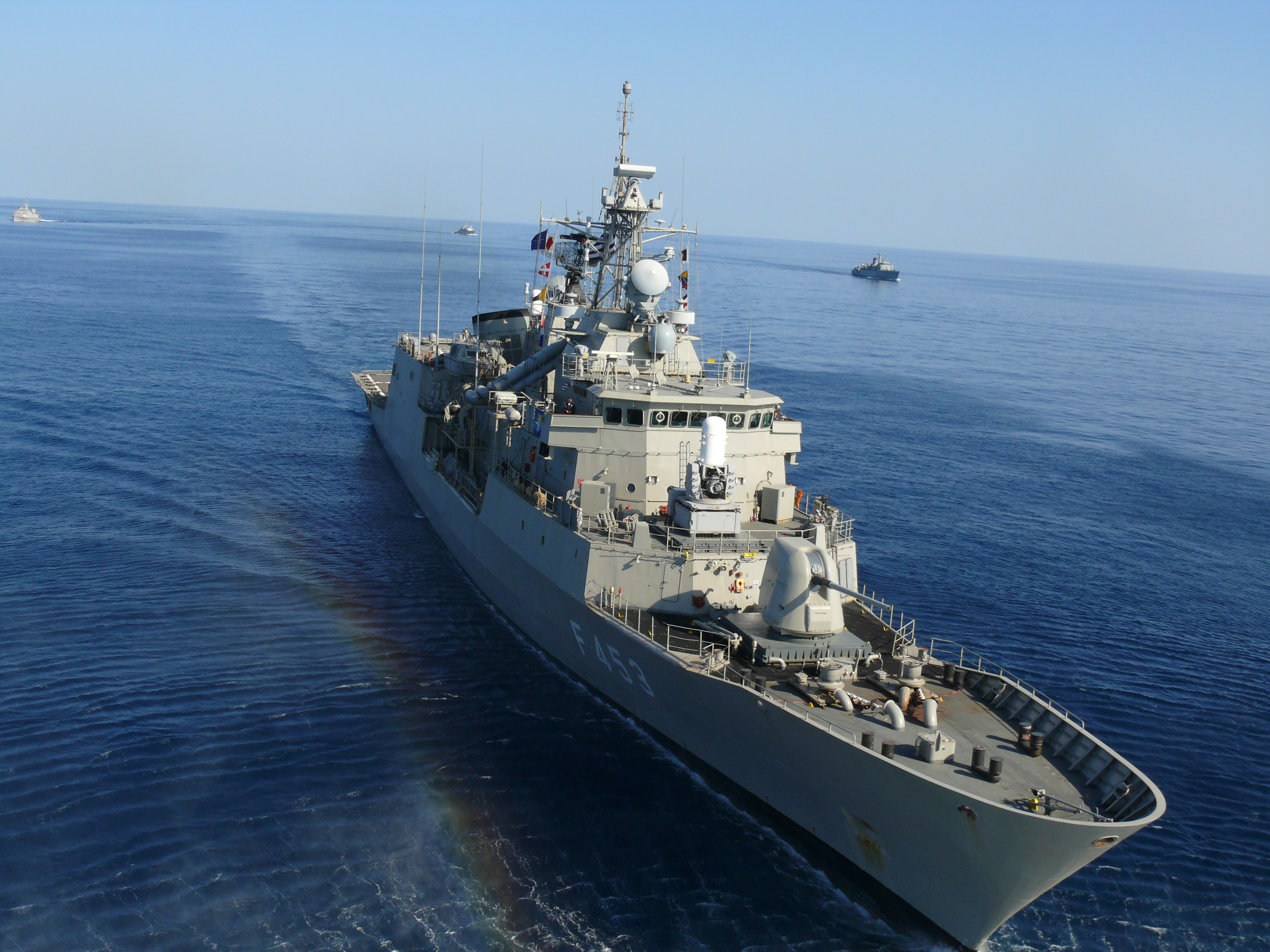
The Hellenic Navy flagship frigate HS Spetsai in the Red Sea while transiting to the Persian Gulf on Operation INAS BAHR (Friendly Seas)

The Hellenic Navy relies mainly on frigates as its primary surface heavy boats. The fleet consists of thirteen frigates. The types operated are the Hydra class (Type: MEKO-200HN), the Elli class (Type: Kortenaer) and (Type : Kimon frigate. The Elli-class frigates HS Elli and HS Limnos were sold to Greece during construction, the rest were bought directly from the Royal Netherlands Navy. The Hydra-class vessels were constructed in Greece by Hellenic Shipyards Co., except from HS Hydra that was constructed by the German company Blohm and Voss based in Hamburg.

Modernization of six frigates was completed in 2010. The intention for the Hydra-class vessels was, as of February 2015, to be modernised with a €400 million upgrade that would extend their operational life to 2035. These plans became a priority for the Navy in 2020, amidst rising tensions with Turkey over delimitation of maritime zones in the Eastern Mediterranean. Greece also negotiated the acquisition of four new Freedom-class frigates from the United States to replace older Ellis' and proposed to the US a wider package of upgrades and future co-production opportunities involving the Constellation-class frigate, currently being developed for the US Navy. The final decision on the type and origin of the new frigates was scheduled to be made in 2021, after examining closely all available proposals from a list of other countries, apart from the US. France, Germany, the Netherlands and the United Kingdom also participated in the selection process. Finally, in September 2021 the decision for the future of the HN frigate fleet was announced, including gradual replacement of the Elli class with the French-built Belharra Hellenique (Frégate de défense et d'intervention - FDI)-class warships, officially constituting the Navy's new Kimon class, and modernisation of the Hydra class in a €5 billion deal that initially extends up to 2026.

Since 2022, three frigates of the Kimon class have been under construction in France by Naval Group. These are HS Kimon (F-601), HS Nearchos (F-602) and HS Formion (F-603). HS Kimon (F-601) was officially delivered in December 2025 and the rest are to follow over the succeeding months. Greece has a contracted option for a fourth ship to be included in the initial production line, if it so chooses.

The frigate HS Psara carries three reliquaries permanently on its onboard historical exhibition. Two contain the taxidermic hearts of Greek War of Independence heroes Admiral Konstantinos Kanaris and Admiral Andreas Miaoulis and one reliquary contains the remains of heroine Rear Admiral (posthumous) Laskarina Bouboulina. The frigate's exhibition can be visited when the ship opens to the public during National Holidays and celebrations.

In January 2024, Defence Minister Nikolaos Dendias announced a proposal to manufacture seven Constellation-class frigates in Greece.

In April 2025, the Ministry of Defense announced plans to purchase two FREMM multipurpose frigates as part of the 2030 Armed Forces modernization program.

==== Gunboats ====
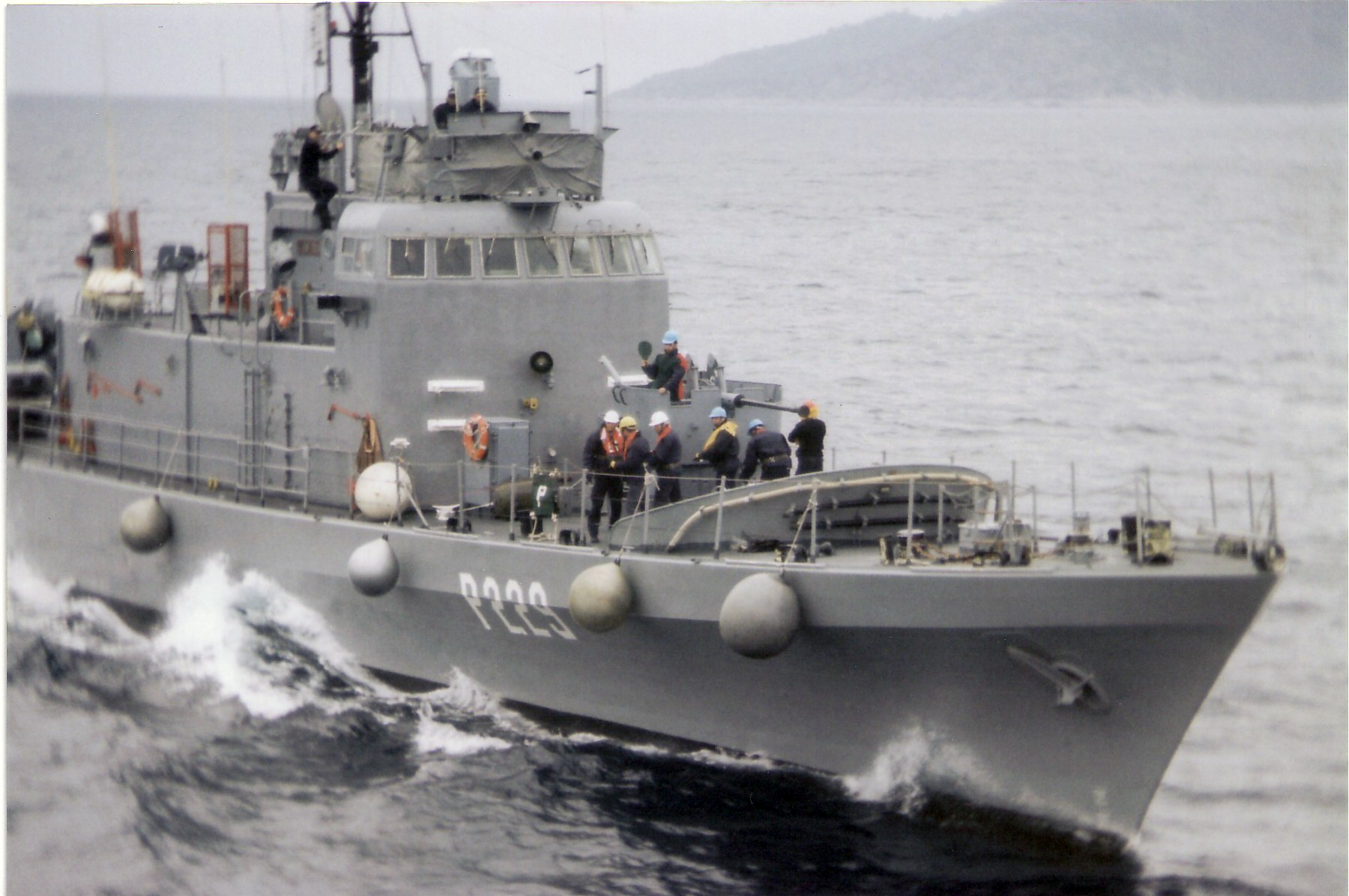
Asheville-class gunboat HS Tolmi conducting drills

The Hellenic Navy operates ten gunboats of the Osprey and Asheville classes. Both Osprey HSY-55 and Osprey HSY-56A classes are designed by the Hellenic Navy following a modular concept so that weapons and sensors can be changed as required. They were built by Hellenic Shipyards (HSY) in Greece. These vessels are similar in appearance to Osprey 55-class gunboats. The first pair was ordered on 20 February 1990. HS Pyrpolitis was launched on 16 September 1992 and HS Polemistis on 21 June 1993. Each ship can carry 25 fully equipped troops. Alternative guns and Harpoon missiles can be fitted as required. Pyrpolitis was renamed Kasos on 11 November 2005, after the island of Kasos in the Dodecanese. The ship is based in the area of Kasos, and the name recognises the island and the Kasos Massacre during the Greek War of Independence. The two Asheville-class gunboats are former US Navy vessels, bought and transferred to Greece in 1989.

==== Attack Missile boats ====
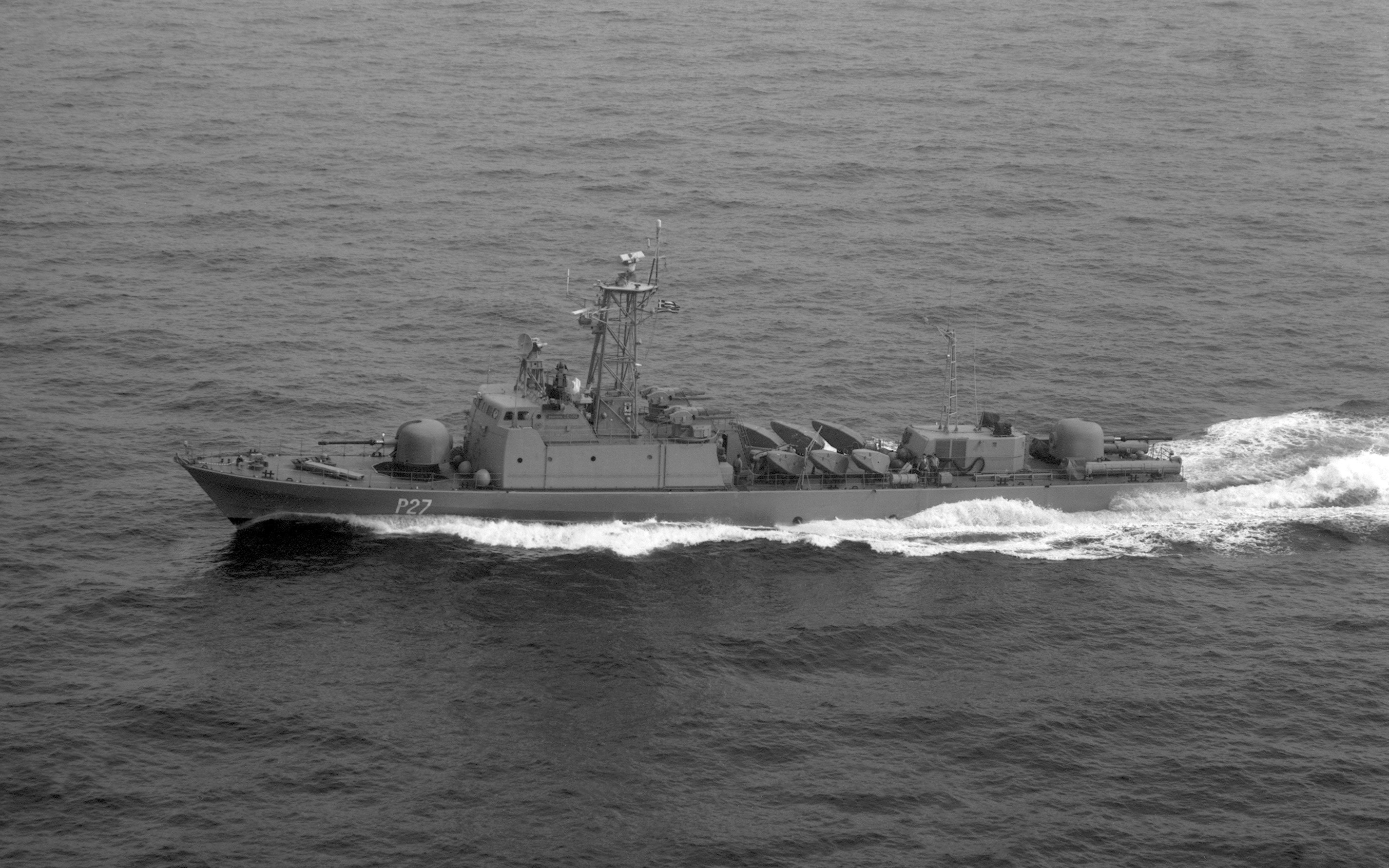
Missile boat HS Xenos underway

The fleet consisted of nineteen missile boats also known as fast attack missile craft. Two new ships (P78 and P79) entered service in 2019. The main purpose of these vessels is offensive anti-ship warfare. The Hellenic Navy operates four types of missile boats. These are the Roussen (Super-Vita), Laskos (La Combattante III), Kavaloudis (La Combattante IIIb) and Votsis (La Combattante IIa) classes. The La Combattante III and La Combattante IIIb classes were upgraded in 2006. For the La Combattante III craft, Thales delivered a TACTICOS combat management system, including four multi-functional operator consoles, one surveillance radar, a fire-control tracking system, one electro-optical tracking and fire control system, an integrated low-probability-of-interception radar, two target designation sights and a tactical data link. The weapon suite of the La Combattante IIIs remained unchanged. Thales was also responsible for the integration of existing guns, surface-to-surface missiles and torpedoes. The La Combattante IIa ships were decommissioned upon completion of the two newly ordered Roussen gunboats.

==== Submarines ====
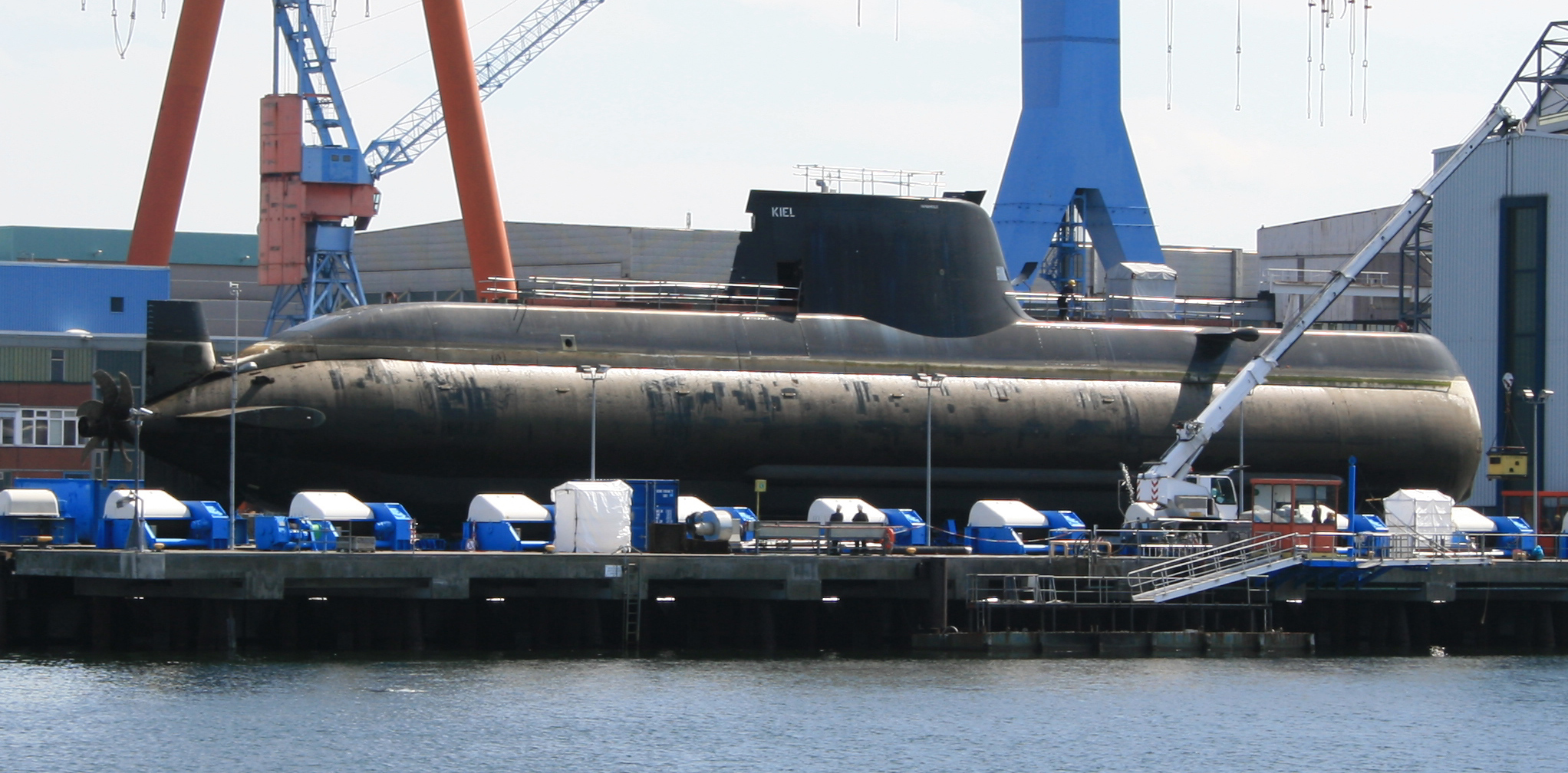
Type 214 submarine HS Papanikolis under construction

The Hellenic Navy Submarine Command operates submarines of four types. The newest and most advanced type operated is the Type 214 Papanikolis class, which is widely considered to be among the most advanced conventional (non-nuclear) propulsion submarines in service with naval forces at the moment. The Type 214 is a diesel-electric submarine developed by the German Howaldtswerke-Deutsche Werft GmbH (HDW). It features diesel propulsion with an air-independent propulsion (AIP) system using Siemens polymer electrolyte membrane (PEM) hydrogen fuel cells. A contract to build four boats for the Hellenic Navy was signed between February 2000 and June 2002. The first boat was built at HDW in Kiel, Germany, and the rest at Hellenic Shipyards Co. in Skaramangas, Greece. The Hellenic Navy named them the Papanikolis class. Other types operated are the 209/1100 Glavkos class, the 209/1200 Poseidon class and one boat of the 209/1500 AIP Okeanos class. The Glavkos submarines were upgraded with the "Neptune I" modernization program and the Poseidon and Okeanos vessels with the "Neptune II" program. The Okeanos upgrade included AIP capabilities very similar to Type 214 so extensive to justify HS Okeanos as a new, separate class when compared to the rest of Type 209/1200 vessels. New dimensions are similar to Type 214 boats. In July 2025, a formal process to acquire additional four submarines was started as part of a 20-year modernization plan estimated to cost $25 billion. Type 218, Type 209NG, Scorpène-class submarine, conventional Barracuda-class submarine (France), and Blekinge-class submarine are being considered, with some of the requirements being 25 percent participation of the domestic defense industry, having Air-independent propulsion, minimized acoustic and magnetic signatures, among others. Additionally, at least two units are expected to be able to carry land-attack cruise missiles, enabling long distance strikes over 1000 kilometers.

==== Special operations craft ====
The Navy operates the endogenous AAWV Aginor (Αγήνωρ) which is an advanced asymmetric warfare vessel (AAWV) that uses latest technologies and composite materials making it suitable for a number of missions including insertion and extraction of Special Operations Forces, interdiction and coastal patrol, as well as search and rescue (SAR) operations.

The Navy also operates the Mark V Special Operations Craft, which is an American design originally developed for the US Navy Seals. The craft are utilised by the Hellenic Navy Underwater Demolition Command and are specifically customised to the needs of the Hellenic Navy and the Aegean theater of operations.

==== Landing boats ====
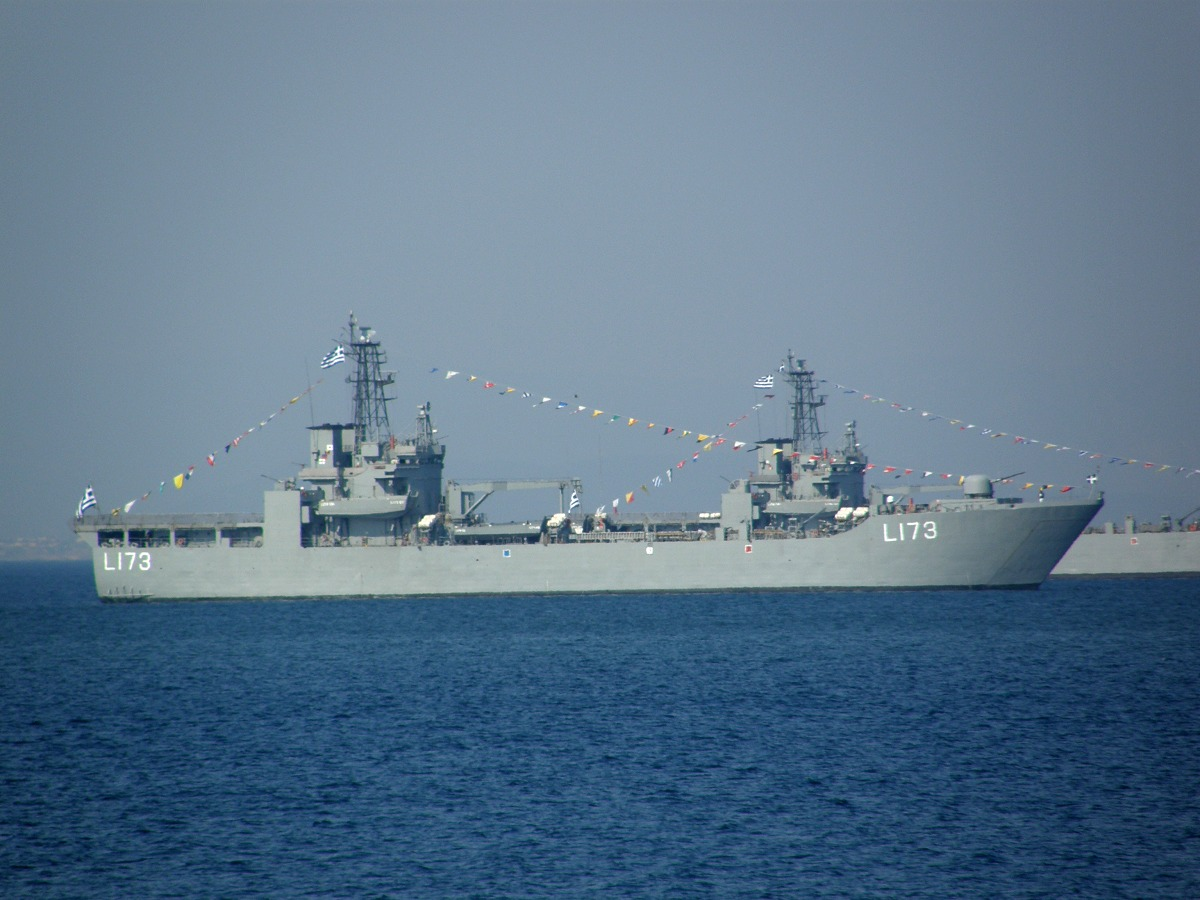
Greek-built Jason-class (LST) landing ship HS Chios at Phaleron Bay

The Hellenic Navy currently operates nine tank landing ships (LST), five of the Greek-built Jason class and four heavy military hovercraft of the Ukrainian/Russian-built Zubr class. The Jason landing craft are capable of transporting 287 troops plus 22 battle tanks or any other combination of other armoured vehicles. The Zubr craft have a military lift of total 130 tonnes of cargo with three battle tanks, eight armoured vehicles, ten personnel carriers and 140 troops or combinations of those and a speed of 40 knots when fully loaded. The Zubr class (Project 1232.2 / NATO codename: "Pomornik") is an air-cushioned landing craft (LCAC). This class of military hovercraft is, as of 2012, the world's largest, with a standard full load displacement of 555 tons. The hovercraft is designed to sealift amphibious assault units (such as marines and tanks) from equipped or non-equipped vessels to non-equipped shores, as well as transport and plant naval mines. The purchase of HS Cephalonia for the Hellenic Navy was the first time a Soviet design had been built for and purchased by a NATO member.

==== Replenishment and other vessels ====
The Hellenic Navy operates seventeen replenishment and support ships including petroleum tankers, water tankers and auxiliary vessels. It also operates two Greek-built transport ships of the Pandora class, eight coastline patrol boats, three minehunters, four torpedo retrievers, sixteen tugboats (both open sea and harbour), four oceanographic & scientific research vessels and two lighthouse tenders. The Navy also preserves three memorial ships including the Pisa-class armoured cruiser HS Georgios Averof which is the only armoured cruiser worldwide still in existence and, although it is permanently a harboured museum ship, is ceremoniously considered in active-service carrying the Rear Admiral's Rank Flag. The Hellenic Navy also has the trireme Olympias in commission, making the Hellenic Navy the navy with the oldest type of commissioned vessel in the world..

=== Aircraft ===
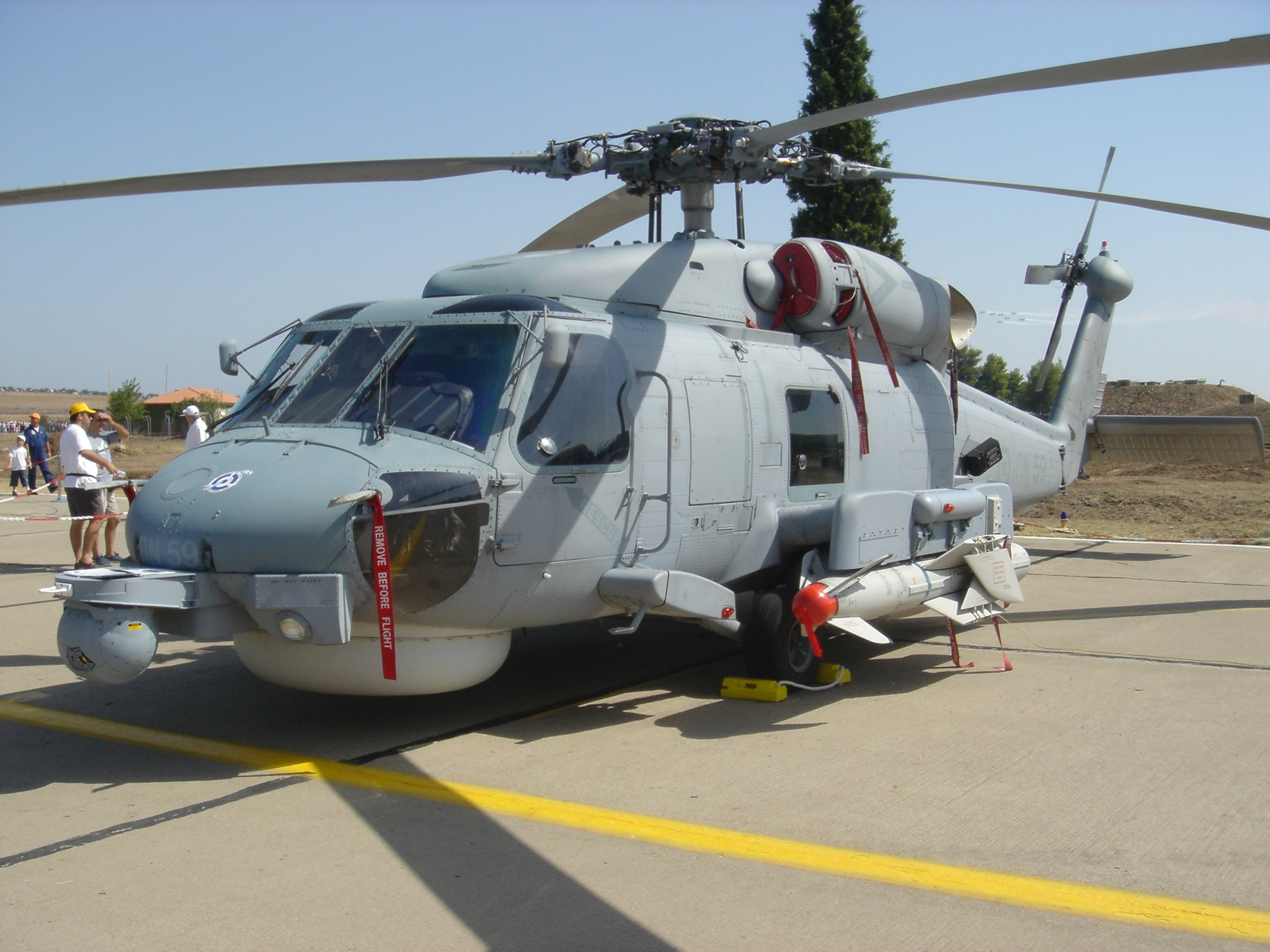
Hellenic Navy S-70B Aegean Hawk at "Archangel 2005" airshow

The Hellenic Navy operates naval aviation units under the Navy Aviation Command, that resulted from the amalgamation of the Navy Helicopter Command and the 353rd Naval Cooperation Squadron, which was run jointly with the Hellenic Air Force.

It currently operates:

- Lockheed Martin P-3B Orions as maritime patrol and naval cooperation platforms. Four upgraded aircraft have gradually started to re-enter the fleet, after a $142 million contract for their upgrade was awarded in February 2016 to Lockheed Martin. (6 delivered, 1 operational/upgraded, 4 more currently upgraded, 1 will be used for parts)
- Sikorsky MH-60R Seahawk: Newer anti-submarine warfare variant of the Sikorsky SH-60 Seahawk helicopter with capability for vertical resupply missions and search & rescue operations. Entered service in March 2024. 3 delivered, another 4 on order.
- Sikorsky S-70B Seahawks, which is the export variant of the Sikorsky SH-60 Seahawk. Furthermore, the Greek variant is the S-70/B-6 Aegean Hawk, which is a blend of the SH-60B and F-models. (11 S-70B6 AegeanHawk)
- Aérospatiale Alouette IIIs, mainly used for missions such as aerial observation, photography, transport and training. (4 delivered, 2 in use)
- Agusta Bell AB-212 ASWs, which is the military variant of the Bell 212, dedicated to anti-submarine warfare. (11 ASW and 2 EW delivered, 6 ASW and 2 EW in use)
- Alpha Unmanned Systems A900 UAV Helicopters. (5 ordered and delivered)
- Schiebel Camcopter S-100 unmanned helicopters, first delivered in April 2026

=== Anti- Aircraft Systems ===
In July 2024, the Hellenic Navy demonstrated a new system called Centaur Counter UAV System. This is made by Hellenic Aerospace Industry and only costs €2,000,000. The system is mounted on the flagship HS Psara and it has knocked down Houthi drones over the Red Sea.

== Ranks and insignia ==
=== Commissioned officers ===
NATO code	OF-10	OF-9	OF-8	OF-7	OF-6	OF-5	OF-4	OF-3	OF-2	OF-1
Hellenic Navy
Hellenic Navy		Ναύαρχος; Navarchos	Αντιναύαρχος; Antinavarchos	Υποναύαρχος; Yponavarchos	Αρχιπλοίαρχος; Archiploiarchos	Πλοίαρχος; Ploiarchos	Αντιπλοίαρχος; Antiploiarchos	Πλωτάρχης; Plotarchis	Υποπλοίαρχος; Ypoploiarchos	Ανθυποπλοίαρχος; Anthypoploiarchos	Σημαιοφόρος; Simaioforos

=== NCOs and enlisted ===
NATO code	OR-9	OR-8	OR-7	OR-6	OR-5	OR-4		OR-3	OR-2	OR-1
Hellenic Navy						male	female			male	female
Hellenic Navy	Ανθυπασπιστής (Note: Greece has only one level of Warrant Officer. According to the current issue (2021) of STANAG 2116, the Greek Warrant Officers are included in OR-9, however they are afforded the privileges of an officer. See STANAG 2116 note 29, page D-9); Anthypaspistis	Αρχικελευστής; Archikelefstis	Επικελευστής; Epikelefstis	Κελευστής; Kelefstis		Δίοπος; Diopos				Ναύτης; Naftis

== Hellenic Navy flags ==
Royal HN Naval Ensign (1833–1858)

Royal HN Naval Ensign (1863–1924 and 1935–1970)

HN Naval Ensign (1830–1833, 1924–1935 and 1974–present)

RHN Naval Jack

HN Naval Jack

Minister of Defence flag

HN 4-star Admiral's Flag

HN Senior Officer's flag

HN Commissioning Pennant

Royal HN Naval Ensign (1970–1973) and HN Naval Ensign (1973–1974)

== Photo gallery ==
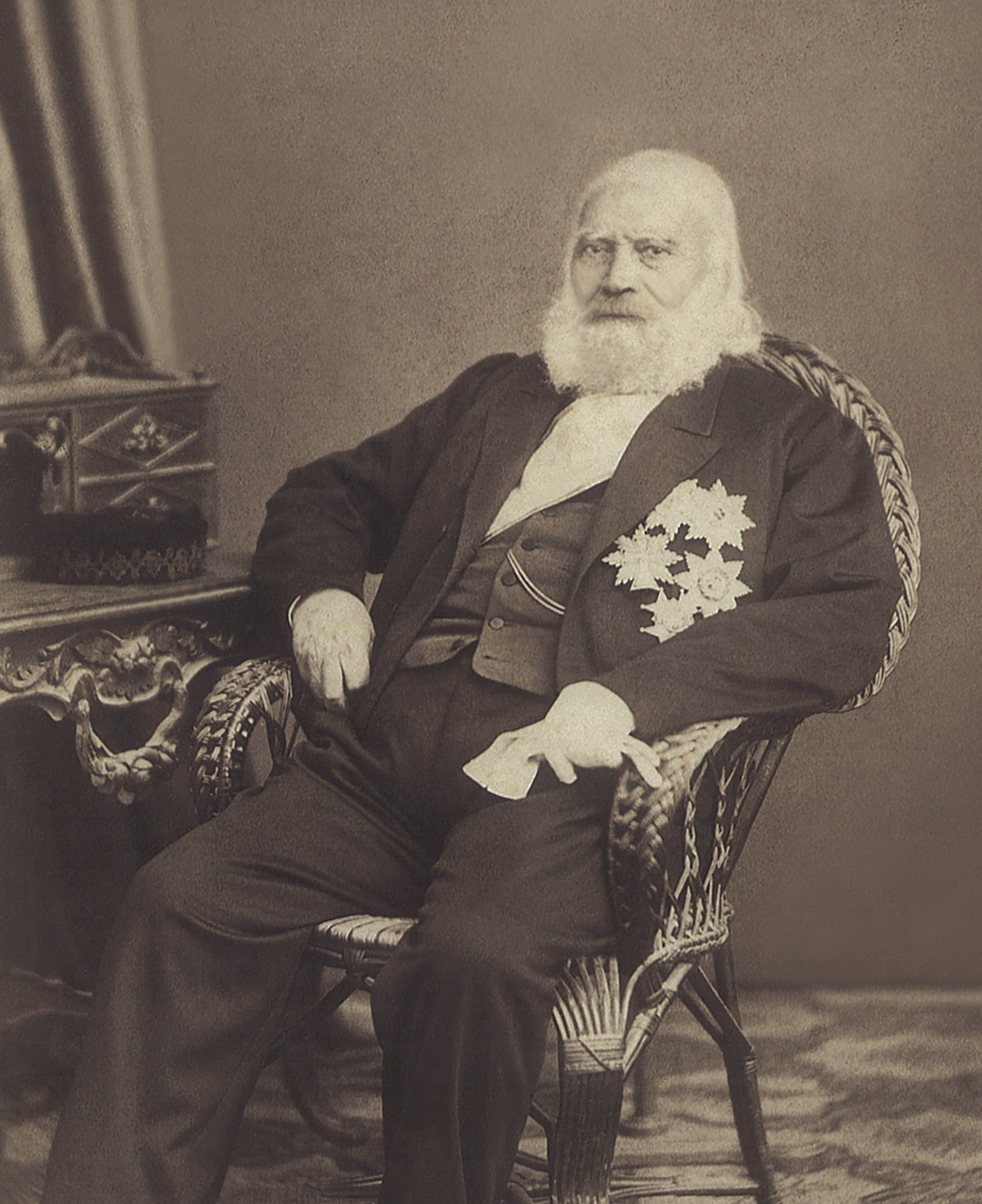
Admiral and War of Independence hero Konstantinos Kanaris (1793–1877)

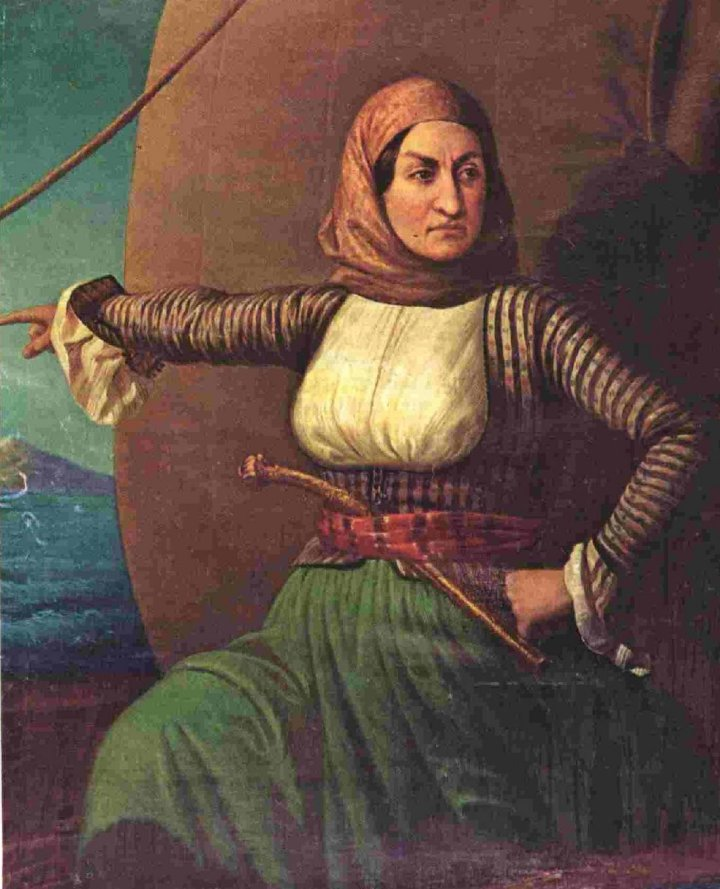
Captain, later Rear Admiral (Posthumous) and War of Independence heroine Laskarina Bouboulina (1771–1825)

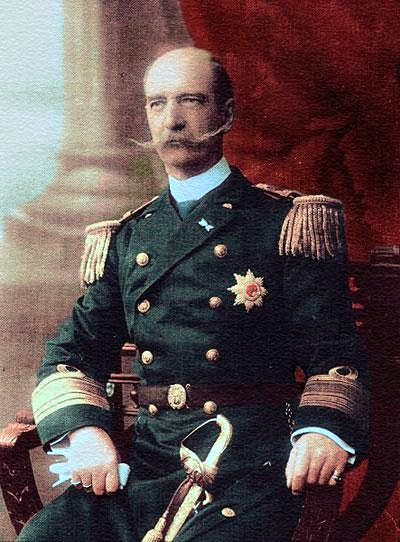
King George in Admiral's uniform of the Hellenic Navy

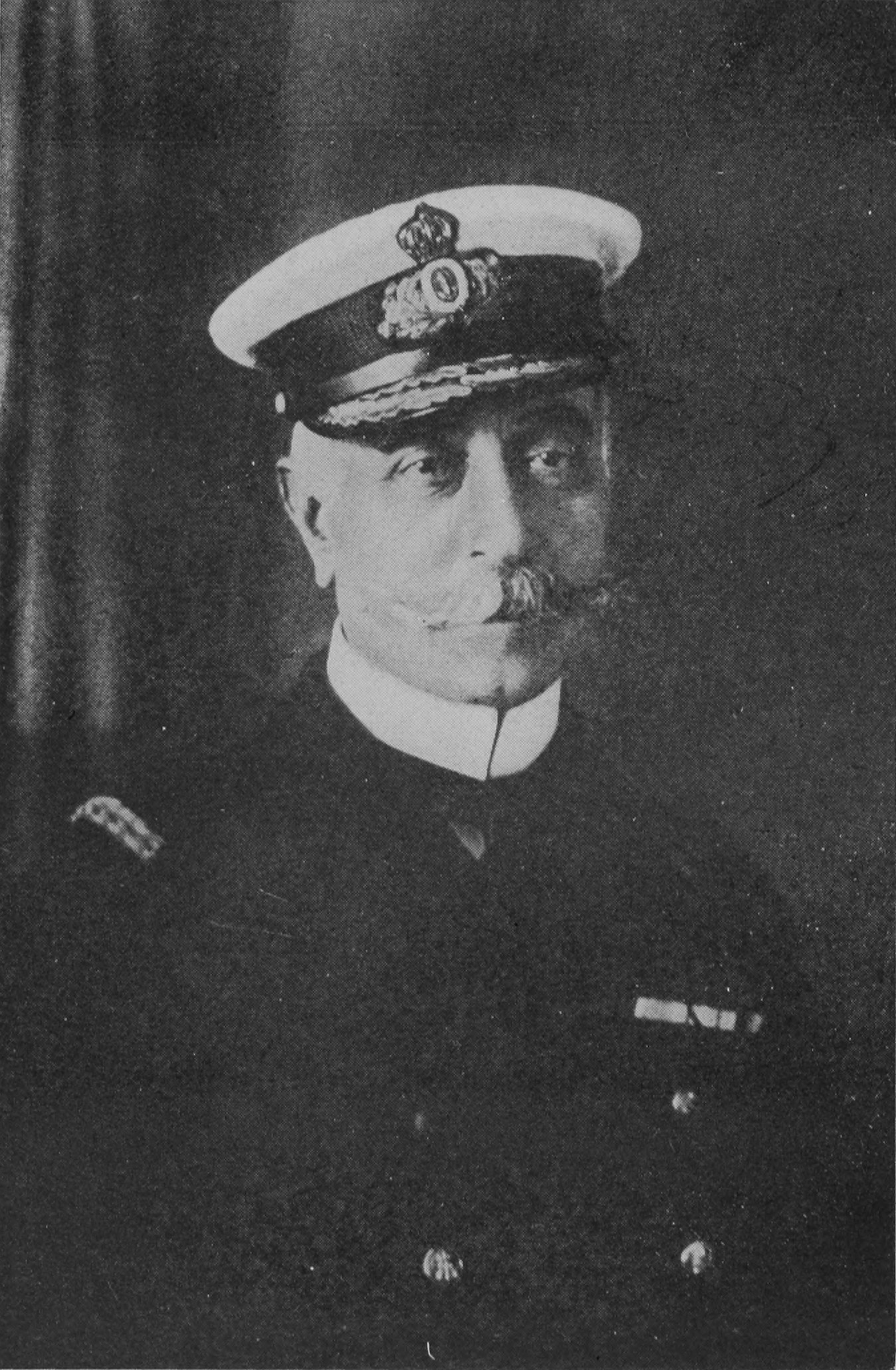
Admiral and President of Greece Pavlos Kountouriotis (1855–1935)

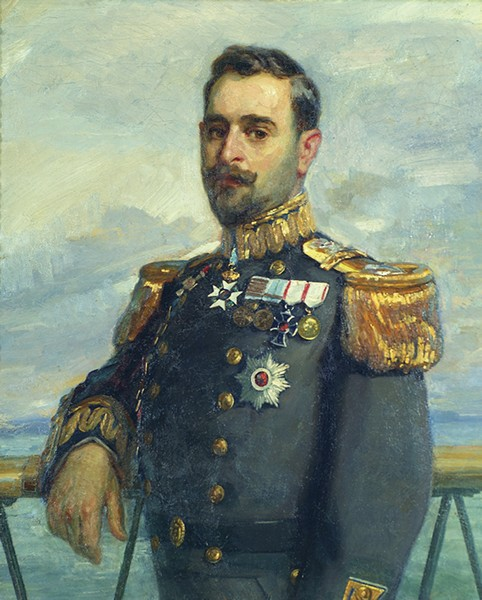
Portrait of Rear Admiral Sofoklis Dousmanis (1868–1952)

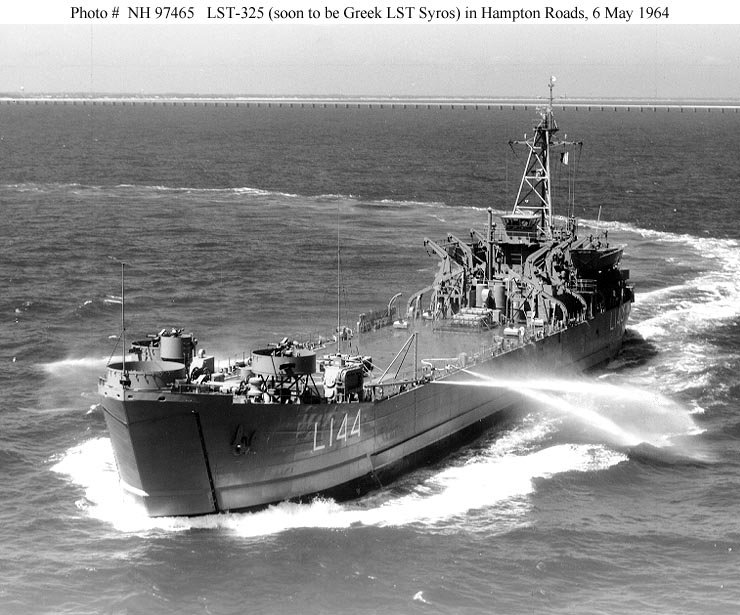
LST HS Syros undergoing trials, 1964

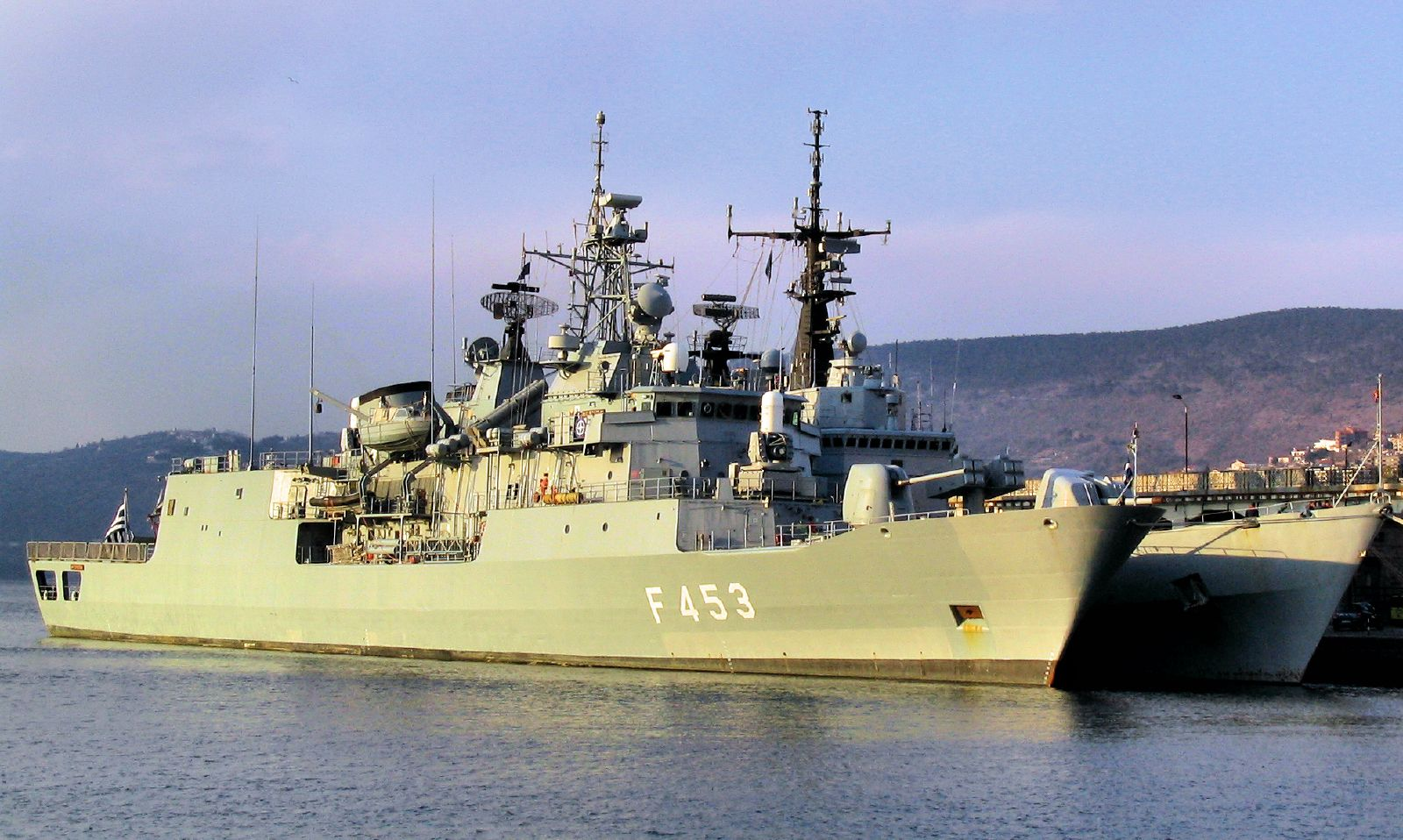
Frigate HS Spetsai in Trieste

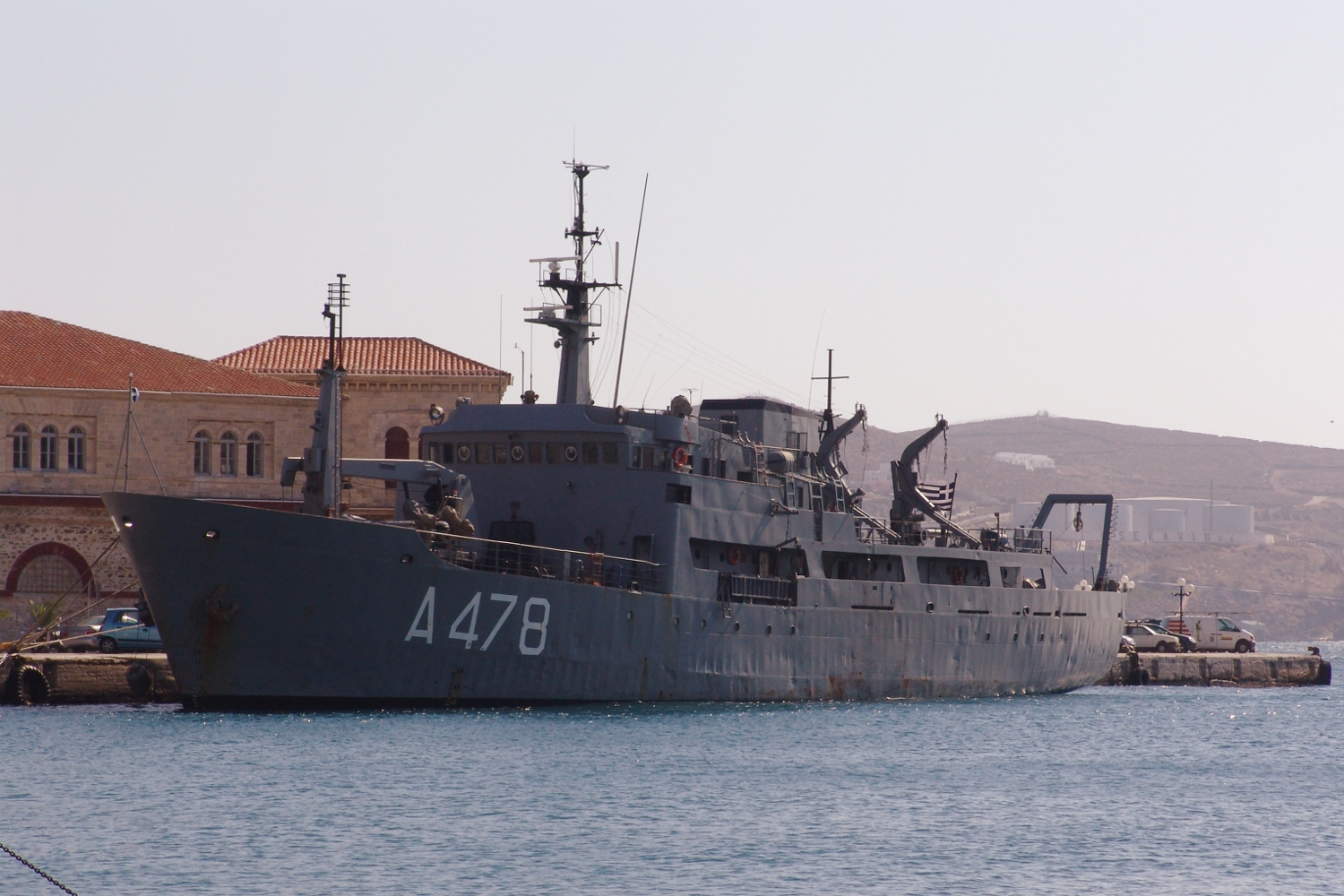
Hydrographic vessel HS Nautilus in Syros harbour

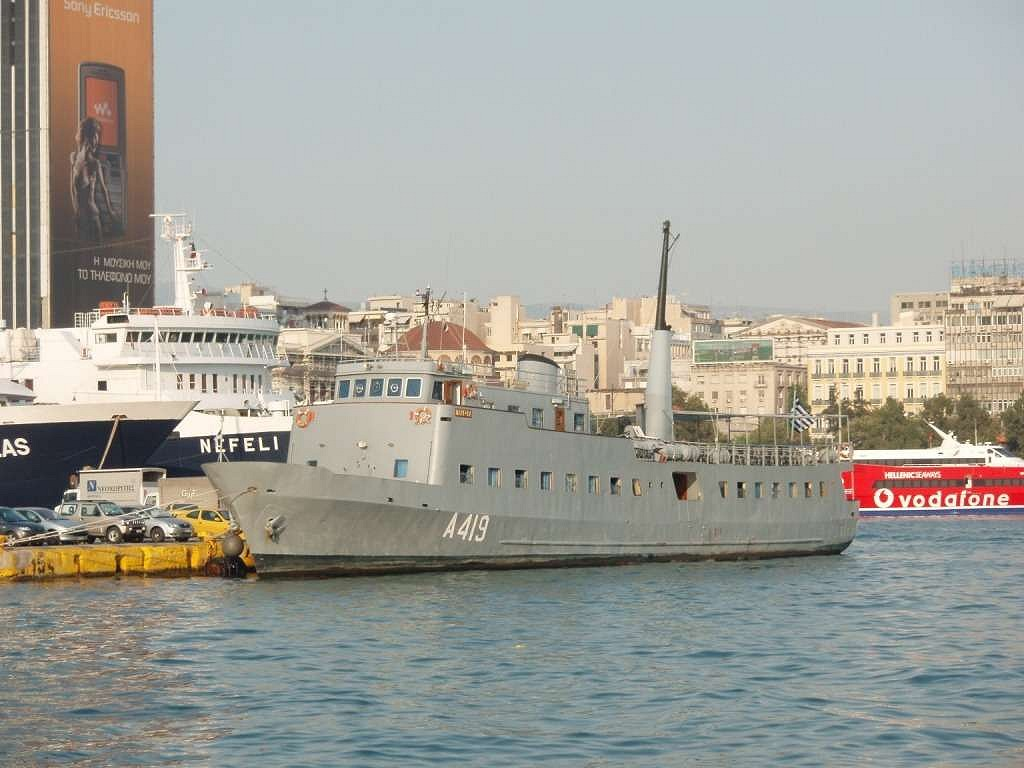
HS Pandora, a passenger ship connecting Piraeus Harbor and Salamis Naval Base

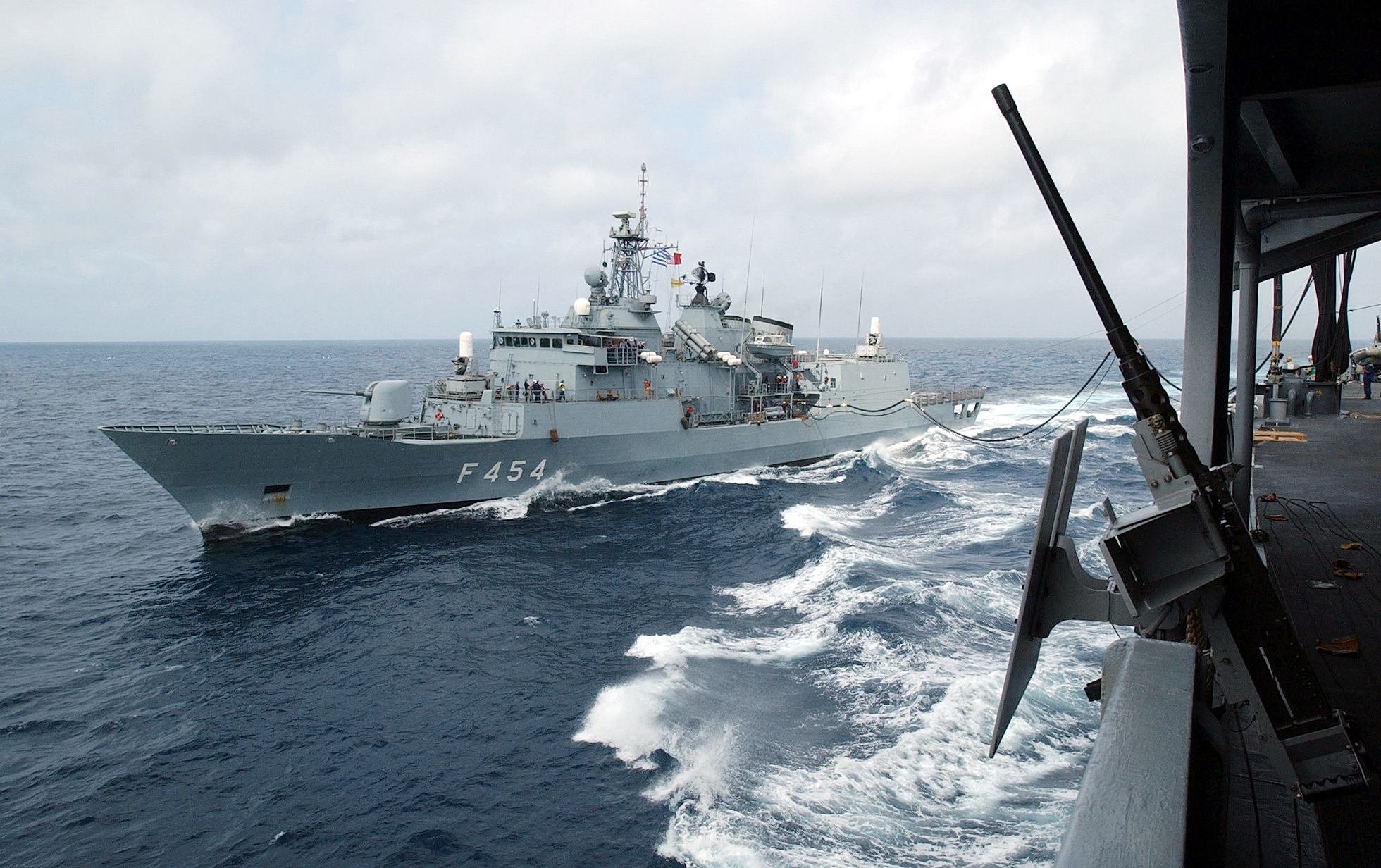
HS Psara in Operation Enduring Freedom

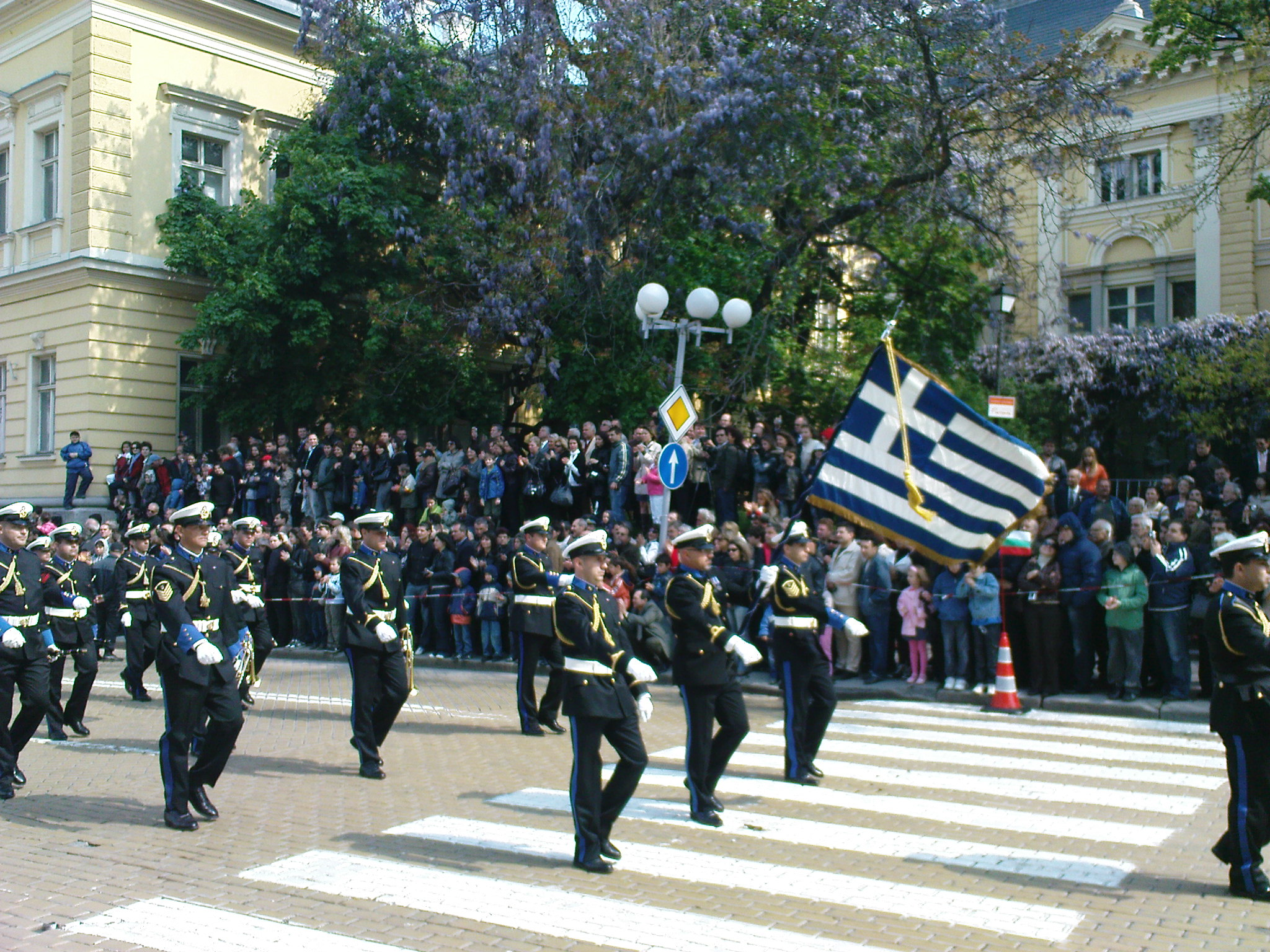
The Hellenic Naval Band participating in the Army Day parade in Sofia, Bulgaria

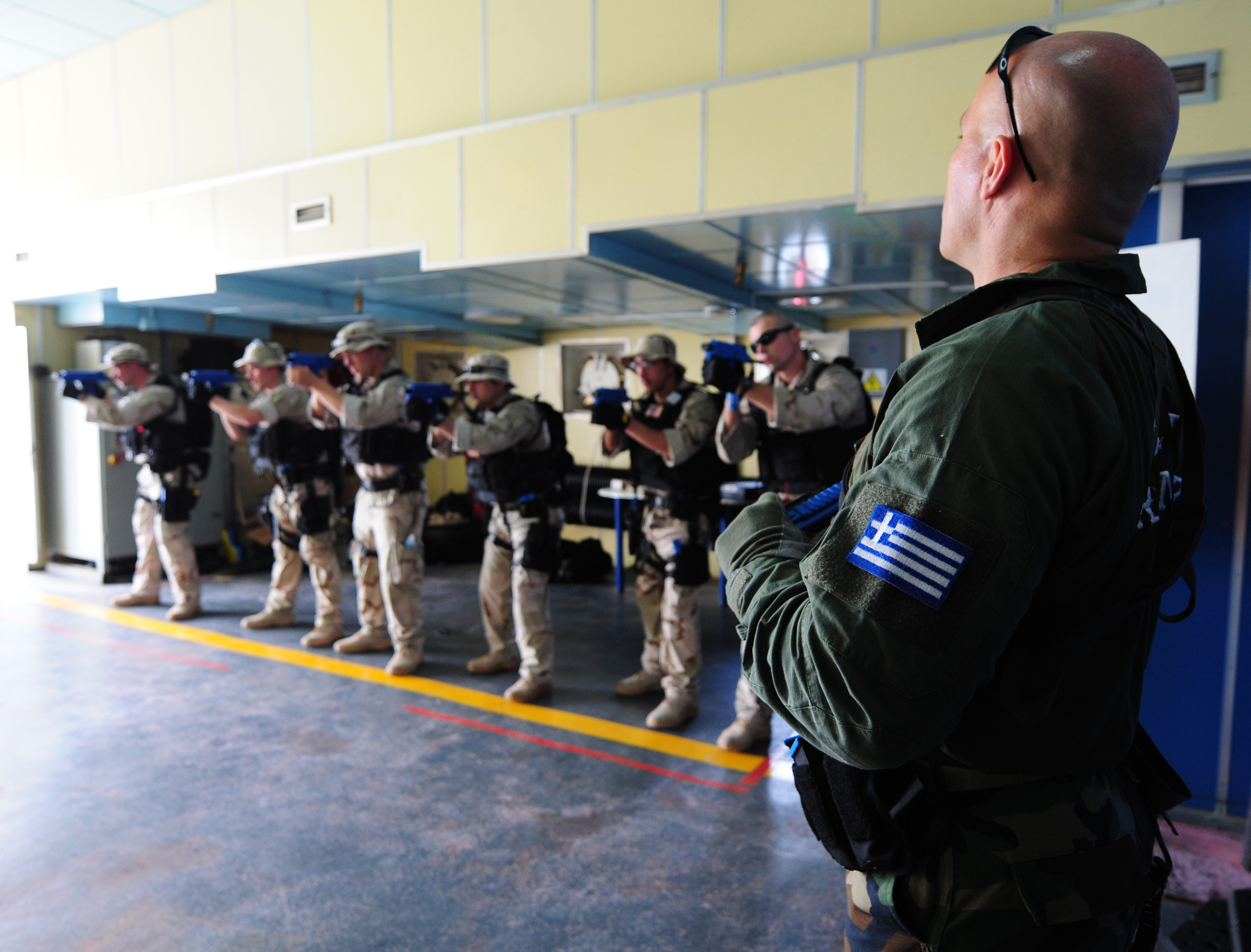
A Hellenic Navy SOF (special operations forces) instructor conducts small arms training with U.S. sailors aboard the HN training ship Aris

== See also ==
- History of the Hellenic Navy
- List of active Hellenic Navy ships
- List of decommissioned ships of the Hellenic Navy
- Hellenic Naval Cadets Academy
- Greek Merchant Navy
