= Northern Greece Naval Command =

Coordinates: 40.5858°N 22.9385°E

- Ναυτική Διοίκηση Βορείου Ελλάδος (ΝΔΒΕ)
- Active: 1935–1941, 1944–present
- Country: Greece
- Allegiance: Hellenic Armed Forces
- Branch: Hellenic Navy
- Type: Naval defence area
- Garrison/HQ: Mikro Emvolo, Kalamaria, Thessaloniki

Northern Greece Naval Command (Greek: Ναυτική Διοίκηση Βορείου Ελλάδος, ΝΔΒΕ), formerly the Northern Aegean Naval Command (Ναυτική Διοίκηση Βορείου Αιγαίου, ΝΔΒΑ), is a regional command of the Hellenic Navy covering the coasts of northern Greece and the northern Aegean Sea, from the Greco-Turkish border at the mouth of the river Evros to Mount Pelion.

== Mission ==
It is one of the three regional naval commands under the Fleet Headquarters (Αρχηγείο Στόλου). It is headquartered in Mikro Emvolo in Kalamaria, Thessaloniki, and is responsible for "maritime surveillance, coastal defence, and the control and coordination of the Coast Guard and other state organs and services for the ensuring of national defence and security from the sea". It is also generally responsible for the supply and harbour services to naval ships, and the mobilization of naval resources in its area of responsibility in case of war.

The command comprises the headquarters in Thessaloniki, the Angelochori Naval Fortress, any ships or services attached to it by Fleet Headquarters, and the Kavala Naval Detachment, which is activated in wartime. It also exercised operational control over the Coast Guard units of northern Greece.

== History ==
Following the capture of Thessaloniki in 1912, the Hellenic Navy established a permanent base in the area in 1926, when a signals station was created at the "Depot" area (Ντεπό). This station initially served both military and commercial maritime communication needs until 1934, when its role was limited to military naval communications. In 1935, Naval Defence Area 5 (Ναυτική Αμυντική Περιοχή 5, ΝΑΠ/5) was established, with a coastal defence and anti-air battery in the nearby Cape Karabournou or Megalo Emvolo. In November 1940, after the outbreak of the Greco-Italian War, the Northwestern Aegean Superior Command (Ανωτέρα Διοίκηση Βορειοδυτικού Αιγαίου) was created. With the German invasion of Greece, the naval installations in the area were destroyed during the Greek retreat, and the naval commands abolished.

After the liberation of Greece in 1944, Naval Command 2 (Ναυτική Διοίκηση 2) was established in Thessaloniki, which on 2 January 1945 was transformed into the Northern Aegean Naval Command (Ναυτική Διοίκηση Βορείου Αιγαίου, ΝΔΒΑ), headquartered initially in the Majestic Hotel in Thessaloniki. The command's work during the subsequent years involved the restoration of naval installations, the clearing of mines and obstacles, and the restoration of order following the turmoils of the Occupation. In 1951, the command moved to Vasilissis Olgas 38 in Thessaloniki, and on 8 February 1960 it moved to new installations at the "Depot", as the previous building was torn down to widen the coastal road. The current headquarters were built in 1976–79, and became operational on 2 January 1980. The old installations at the "Depot" (known as Παλαιά ΝΔΒΑ) continue to be used for storage and as a barracks. At the same time, the old naval fortress at Megalo Emvolo was reactivated as the "Angelochori Transmission Centre" (Κέντρο Εκπομπής Αγγελοχωρίου, ΚΕΑ).

With the redefinition of its area of responsibility, the Northern Aegean Naval Command was renamed Northern Greece Naval Command on 20 July 1976.
