= Navy Aviation Command (Greece) =

The Navy Aviation Command (Greek: Διοίκηση Αεροπορίας Ναυτικού, ΔΑΝ) is the naval aviation component of the Hellenic Navy. It was established on 23 January 2018 from the amalgamation of the Navy Helicopter Command (Διοίκηση Ελικοπτέρων Ναυτικού, ΔΕΝ) and the 353rd Naval Cooperation Squadron (353 ΜΝΑΣ), which was run jointly with the Hellenic Air Force.

The new formation is based in the 112th Combat Wing in Elefsis Air Base, occupying the infrastructure formerly used by the disbanded 353rd Squadron. The Navy Aviation Command comprises the following units:

- Navy Aircraft Squadron (Μοίρα Αεροσκαφών Ναυτικού, ΜΑΝ)
- 1st Navy Helicopter Squadron (Μοίρα Ελικοπτέρων Ναυτικού 1, ΜΕΝ/1)
- 2nd Navy Helicopter Squadron (Μοίρα Ελικοπτέρων Ναυτικού 2, ΜΕΝ/2)
- Navy Helicopter School (Σχολή Ελικοπτέρων Ναυτικού, ΣΕΝ)
- Navy Helicopter Base (Βάση Ελικοπτέρων Ναυτικού, ΒΕΝ)
- Amfiali Helicopter Station (Ελικοσταθμός Αμφιάλης, Ε/Σ ΑΜΦΙΑΛΗΣ)

== Aircraft ==
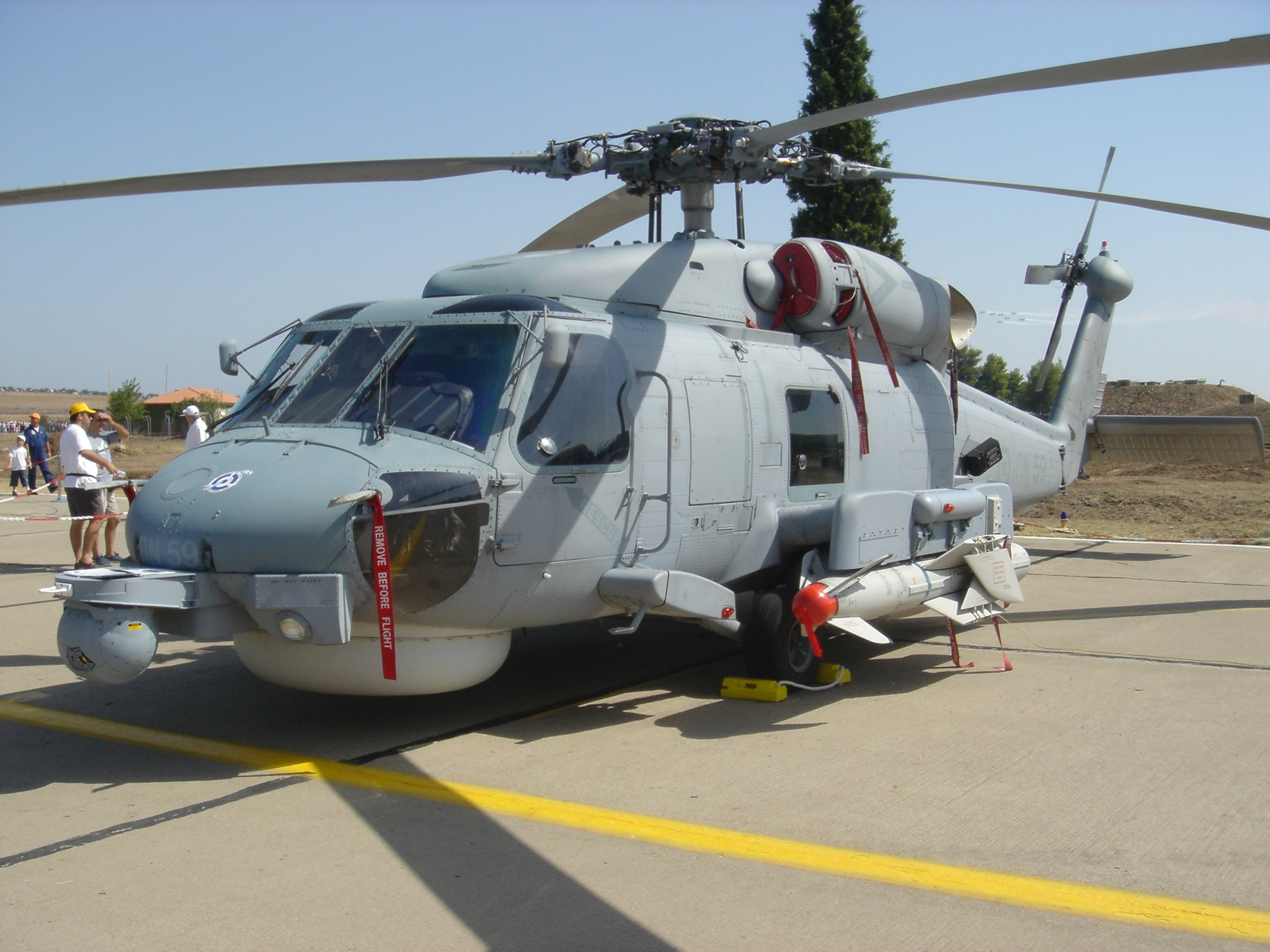
Hellenic Navy S-70B Aegean Hawk at Archangel 2005 airshow

The Hellenic Navy operates naval aviation units under the Navy Aviation Command, that resulted from the amalgamation of the Navy Helicopter Command and the 353rd Naval Cooperation Squadron, which was run jointly with the Hellenic Air Force.

It currently operates:

- Lockheed Martin P-3B Orions as maritime patrol and naval cooperation platforms. Four upgraded aircraft have gradually started to re-enter the fleet, after a $142 million contract for their upgrade was awarded in February 2016 to Lockheed Martin.
- Sikorsky S-70B Seahawks, which is the export variant of the Sikorsky SH-60 Seahawk. Furthermore, the Greek variant is the S-70/B-6 Aegean Hawk, which is a blend of the SH-60B and F-models.
- Aérospatiale Alouette IIIs, mainly used for missions such as aerial observation, photography, transport and training.
- Agusta Bell AB-212 ASWs, which is the military variant of the Bell 212, dedicated to anti-submarine warfare.

== See also ==
- Naval Air Service (Greece)
