= Japanese transport ship Hokkai Maru =

History

Empire of Japan
- Name: Hokkai Maru
- Owner: Osaka Shosen K.K.
- Builder: Mitsubishi Zosen K.K., Nagasaki
- Laid down: 15 November 1931
- Launched: 3 September 1932
- Completed: 4 March 1933
- Acquired: Requisitioned by Imperial Japanese Navy, 22 September 1941
- Stricken: 15 February 1942
- Identification: 38123
- Fate: destroyed by accidental fire, 12 November 1945
- Notes: Call sign: JKVE

General characteristics
- Class & type: Kinai Maru-class passenger/cargo ship
- Tonnage: 8,416 GRT
- Length: 138.7 m (455 ft 1 in) o/a
- Beam: 18.5 m (60 ft 8 in)
- Draught: 12.5 m (41 ft 0 in)
- Installed power: 8453 bhp
- Propulsion: 2 x 6 cyl. 2SCSA Sulzer diesel engines, dual shaft, 2 screws, diesel
- Speed: 18.5 knots

Hokkai Maru (Japanese: 北海丸) (English: North Sea) was a Kinai Maru-class auxiliary transport of the Imperial Japanese Navy during World War II. She participated in the Japanese occupation of British Borneo and was part of ill-fated convoy HI-71.

== History ==
She was laid down on 15 November 1931 at the Nagasaki shipyard of Mitsubishi Zosen K.K. at the behest of Osaka Shosen K.K./Osaka Merchant Marine Co. She was launched on 3 September 1932, completed 4 March 1933, and registered in Osaka. She served as a passenger ship for Osaka Shosen travelling from Kobe to New York via the Panama Canal and in 1938, further onward to Europe. In July 1941, the US closed the Panama Canal to Japanese shipping due to Japan's invasion of Indochina. On 23 September 1941, she was requisitioned by the Imperial Japanese Navy. On 10 November 1941, she was designated an auxiliary transport and assigned to the Yokosuka Naval District under Captain Yamamura Minoru (山村實).

=== Invasion of Borneo ===
In November 1941, she was assigned to Southern Force (under Vice Admiral Kondo Nobutake) as part of the Borneo Invasion Group (under Rear Admiral Kurita Takeo), code-named "Operation B" (the invasion of British Borneo). Her specific unit, the Miri and Seria Invasion unit, was led by Rear Admiral Hashimoto Shintarō. The force consisted of Hokkai Maru carrying the No.2 Yokosuka Special Naval Landing Force along with four other Imperial Japanese Navy transports (Tonan Maru No 3 carrying the 4th Naval Construction Unit, and three transports carrying equipment and supplies, Unyo Maru No. 2, Kamikawa Maru, and Mitakesan Maru) and five Imperial Japanese Army transports carrying the 25th Army (Katori Maru, Hiyoshi Maru, Myoho Maru, Kenkon Maru, and Nichiran Maru). The force was escorted by two heavy cruisers (Kumano, Suzuya), two light cruisers (Yura and Kinu), six destroyers (Fubuki, Murakumo, Shinonome, Shirakumo, Usugumo, Sagiri), a seaplane tender (Kamikawa Maru), two minesweepers (W-3 and W-6), and a subchaser (CH-7). On 13 December 1941, the convoy left Cam Ranh Bay, Indochina (Mitakesan Maru is later detached to deliver supplies to the Philippines). On 15 December 1941, the transports arrived and disembarked their troops unopposed at Seria, Miri, and Lutong, successfully occupying the airfields and oil wells. On 17 December 1941, the destroyer Shinonome was sunk by a Dutch Dornier Do 24 flying-boat flying from Tarakan.

On 22 December 1941, two battalions of the 25th Army (one battalion remains behind) and the SNLF re-embarked on the nine transports escorted by the same covering force (less the subchaser CH-7 which remained at Miri) to occupy Kuching, the capital of Sarawak. To the west, an additional screen was provided by cruisers Mikuma and Mogami, and destroyer Hatsuyuki. On 23 December 1941 near Kuching, the Dutch submarine HNLMS K XIV attacked and sank the transports Hiyoshi Maru and Katori Maru; and damaged Tonan Maru No. 3 and Hokkai Maru (which is so heavily damaged that she is grounded to avoid sinking). Later that day, the convoy reached the mouth of the Santubong River and began to disembark their troops on the 24th. In the late evening or early morning of the 23rd/24th, HNLMS K XVI torpedoed and sank the destroyer Sagiri. On 25 December 1941, HMNS K XIV attacked again and torpedoed and damaged the transport Nichiran Maru. On 26 December 1941, Dutch Army Martin B-10 bombers from Samarinda, Borneo bomb and sink the minesweeper W-6 and the transport/collier Unyo Maru No. 2. HNLMS K XVI was later torpedoed and sunk by the Kaidai-type submarine I-166 on her way back to Soerabaja. Despite the loss of two destroyers, three transports, and a minesweeper as well as the damaging of three transports, the mission successfully occupied Kuching.

On 15 February 1942, Hokkai Maru was removed from the Navy List. In September 1942, she was re-floated and towed to Singapore by auxiliary transport Heito Maru and auxiliary minesweeper Toshi Maru No. 2. Repairs were completed in September 1943 and she returned to transport duty completing numerous uneventful convoys throughout the Japanese occupied zones. She appears to have returned to civilian control.

=== Convoy Hi-71 ===
In August 1944, she was part of the ill-fated fast convoy HI-71 under Rear Admiral Kajioka Sadamichi which had left Mako, Taiwan for Manila in a typhoon to deliver much-needed troops and supplies for the defense of the Philippines. The convoy consisted of fleet oiler Hayasui; stores ship Irako; oilers Teiyō Maru, Zuihō Maru, Kyokutō Maru, Nisshō Maru, and Eiyo Maru; transports Awa Maru, Noshiro Maru, Teia Maru, and Noto Maru; cargo ship Kashii Maru; and IJA landing craft depot ships Tamatsu Maru and Mayasan Maru. The force was screened by escort carrier Taiyō, destroyers Fujinami, Yunagi, and Asakaze, and escorts Hirado, Kurahashi, Mikura, Shōnan, Sado, Etorofu, Matsuwa, Hiburi, and CD-11. In the morning on 18 August 1944, the convoy is attacked by the American submarine USS Redfish which torpedoed and damaged the oiler Eiyo Maru (which is forced to return to Takao escorted by destroyers Asakaze and Yunagi). In the late evening, the convoy is attacked by the American submarine USS Rasher sinking the escort carrier Taiyō (killing 747) and the transport Teia Maru (killing 2,665 including 2,316 troops). On 19 August 1944, the convoy divided into two groups. Rasher pursues one group and successfully torpedoes the transports Awa Maru and Noshiro Maru (who are both beached off Currimao, Luzon to avoid sinking). American submarines USS Bluefish and USS Spadefish join in the attack with Bluefish sinking the fleet oiler Hayasui and the oiler Teiyō Maru; and Spadefish sinking the landing craft depot ship Tamatsu Maru (killing 4,890 including 4,755 troops). While escorts Sado, Matsuwa, and Hiburi kept the submarines occupied, the undamaged ships (3 oilers, 1 transport, 1 stores ship, 1 cargo ship, and 1 landing craft depot ship as well as the other escorts) were able to take refuge in San Fernando, La Union before reforming and making it to Manila on 21 August 1944 (Awa Maru arrived later that day under tow and Noshiro Maru on the 24th). The defending escorts Sado, Matsuwa and Hiburi were intercepted and sunk as they attempted to rejoin their convoy in Manila by the American submarines USS Harder and USS Haddo.

On 25 August 1944, Hokkai Maru and the rest of the much reduced convoy HI-71 departed Manila for Singapore consisting of 4 oilers (Kyokutō Maru and Zuihō Maru augmented by Azusa Maru and Kyokuhō Maru) and the repaired transport Awa Maru escorted by destroyer Fujinami, 3 escorts (Hirado, Mikura, and Kurahashi), and sub-chaser CH-28. Kyokuhō Maru developed engine trouble was diverted with Fujinami to Miri, Malaysia. The remaining convoy arrived at Singapore on 1 September 1944.

=== Demise ===
On 21 September 1944, Hokkai Maru departed Surabaya, Java escorted by gunboat Nankai (the ex-Dutch Regulus). On 23 September 1944, Hokkai Maru and Nankai struck mines 15 miles west of Sebuku Island leaving both ships crippled. Hokkai Maru is towed by auxiliary transport Kita Maru (the ex-Dutch Gemma) and beached to prevent her sinking under the watch of minesweeper W-11. On 16 November 1944, she is re-floated and towed back to Surabaya by rescue tug Akitsu Maru, and auxiliary netlayers Kanko Maru and Shunsen Maru, with minesweeper W-12 and auxiliary sub-chasers CHa-2 and CHa-3 providing escort. She underwent repairs through the end of the war at the No. 102 Naval Construction and Repair Department at Surabaya, Java. In October 1945, she was seized by the Indonesian People's Revolutionary Front and on 12 November 1945, she was destroyed by a fire.
