= List of ship commissionings in 1933 =

The list of ship commissionings in 1933 includes a chronological list of all ships commissioned in 1933.

	Operator	Ship	Flag	Class and type	Pennant	Other notes
1 April	Reichsmarine	Deutschland		Deutschland-class cruiser		
5 April	Royal Netherlands Navy	Johan Maurits van Nassau		Johan Maurits van Nassau-class sloop		
6 July	Royal Netherlands Navy	K XIV		K XIV-class submarine	N 22	
19 December	Royal Netherlands Navy	K XVII		K XIV-class submarine		
30 December	Royal Netherlands Navy	K XV		K XIV-class submarine	N 24	
