= Japanese submarine chaser CH-7 =

1938 Japanese submarine chaser

History

Empire of Japan
- Name: CH-7
- Builder: Tsurumi Iron Works, Yokohama
- Laid down: 30 October 1937
- Launched: 10 June 1938
- Completed: 15 November 1938
- Commissioned: 15 November 1938
- Stricken: 25 May 1945
- Fate: Sunk by aircraft, 11 April 1945
- Notes: Call sign: JUUD

General characteristics
- Type: Submarine chaser
- Displacement: 291 long tons (296 t) standard; 309 long tons (314 t) trial
- Length: 56.2 m (184 ft 5 in) overall; 55.5 m (182 ft 1 in) waterline
- Beam: 5.6 m (18 ft 4 in)
- Draught: 2.1 m (6 ft 11 in)
- Propulsion: 2 × Kampon Mk.22 Model 6 diesels, 2 shafts, 2,600 bhp
- Speed: 20.0 knots (23.0 mph; 37.0 km/h)
- Range: 2,000 nmi (3,700 km) at 14 kn (16 mph; 26 km/h)
- Complement: 59
- Armament: 2 × 40 mm heavy machine guns; 36 × depth charges; 2 × Type 94 depth charge projectors; 1 × depth charge thrower; 1 × Type 93 active sonar; 1 × Type 93 hydrophone; No.4, November 1944; 2 × 40 mm heavy machine guns; 3 × Type 96 25 mm AA guns; 36 × depth charges; 2 × Type 94 depth charge projectors; 2 × depth charge throwers (estimate); 1 × 13-Gō surface search radar; 1 × Type 3 active sonar; 1 × Type 93 hydrophone

CH-7 or No. 7 (jp: 第七号駆潜艇) was a No.4-class submarine chaser of the Imperial Japanese Navy during World War II.

== History ==
CH-7 was laid down on 30 October 1937 at the Yokohama shipyard of Tsurumi Iron Works, launched on 10 June 1938, and completed and commissioned on 15 November 1938. On 8 December 1941, she was assigned to Sub Chaser Division 11 (SCD 11) under Commandeer Hayashi Risaku, 9th Base Force, Southern Expeditionary Fleet. CH-8 and CH-9 were also assigned to the squadron.

=== Invasion of Borneo ===
In November 1941, she was assigned to the Borneo Invasion Group (under Rear Admiral Kurita Takeo), code-named "Operation B" (the invasion of British Borneo). The force consisted of five Imperial Japanese Army transports carrying the 25th Army (Katori Maru, Hiyoshi Maru, Myoho Maru, Kenkon Maru, and Nichiran Maru); and five Imperial Japanese Navy transports (Hokkai Maru carrying the No.2 Yokosuka Special Naval Landing Force, Tonan Maru No 3 carrying the 4th Naval Construction Unit, and three transports carrying equipment and supplies, Unyo Maru No. 2, Kamikawa Maru, and Mitakesan Maru). The force was escorted by CH-7 along with and two minesweepers (W-3 and W-6) while two heavy cruisers (Kumano, Suzuya), two light cruisers (Yura and Kinu), six destroyers (Fubuki, Murakumo, Shinonome, Shirakumo, Usugumo, Sagiri), provided distant cover; and a seaplane tender (Kamikawa Maru) provided air support. On 13 December 1941, the convoy left Cam Ranh Bay, Indochina (Mitakesan Maru is later detached to deliver supplies to the Philippines). On 15 December 1941, the transports arrived and disembarked their troops unopposed at Seria, Miri, and Lutong, successfully occupying the airfields and oil wells. On 17 December 1941, the destroyer Shinonome was sunk by a Dutch Dornier Do 24 flying-boat flying from Tarakan. CH-7 remained at Miri with one battalion of the 25th Army while the rest of the force departed on 22 December 1941 to occupy Kuching. On 25 December 1941, CH-7 left Miri arriving at Kuching on 26 December 1941.

=== Invasion of Palembang and Banka Island ===
On 9 February 1942, she departed Camranh Bay as part of "Operation L" tasked with the invasion and occupation of Palembang and Banka Island, Sumatra. The invasion force consisted of eight transports escorted by subchasers, CH-7 and CH-8; light cruiser Sendai; destroyers Fubuki, Hatsuyuki, Shirayuki, and Asagiri; and minesweepers W-1, W-2, W-3, W-4 and W-5.

=== Invasion of Northern Sumatra ===
On 10 March 1942, she departed Singapore as part of "Operation T" tasked with the invasion and occupation of Northern Sumatra. The invasion force consisted of 4 convoys carrying 22,000 soldiers including the Imperial Guards Division. CH-7 served as escort along with section 1 of Minesweeper Division 44 for one of the convoys consisting of the minelayer Hatsutaka, submarine tender Nagoya Maru, and eight transports. The force reached Sumatra unmolested on 12 March 1942 as Allied air and naval power had been severely reduced after the Battle of the Java Sea and the Dutch East Indies campaign.

=== Reinforcement of Burma ===
On 19 March 1942, she departed Camranh Bay as part of "Operation U" tasked with the reinforcement of Japanese troops in Burma. The convoy is escorted by subchasers CH-7 and CH-8 along with a light cruiser Kashii (which serves as flagship), five destroyers (Shikinami, Asakaze, Harukaze, Hatakaze, and Matsukaze); an escort ship (Shimushu); a minelayer (Hatsutaka), 3 minesweepers (W-1, W-3, W-4); the 91st Subchaser Division (AN Choko Maru, PC Shonan Maru No. 5, PC Shonan Maru No. 7); a gunboat (Eiko Maru); an Ōtori-class torpedo boat (Kari), and an auxiliary gunboat (Kosho Maru). The warships escorted the First Burma Transport Convoy consisting of 32 transports carrying the main body of the Imperial Japanese Army's 56th Division.

=== Interim ===
On 14 July 1942, CH-7 is assigned along with CH-8 and CH-9 to Submarine Chaser Division 11, 10th Special Base Force, 1st Southern Expeditionary Fleet, Southwest Area Fleet. She conducts various escort duties throughout southeast Asia primarily in the waters surrounding Vietnam, Indonesia, Singapore, and Malaysia.

=== Convoy Mashi-03 ===
On 7 November 1944, she departed Manila for Singapore with CH-8 as escort for convoy MASHI-03 consisting of tankers Nichinan Maru No. 2 and Shimotsu Maru. On 8 November 1944, Nichinan Maru No. 2 was torpedoed and sunk by the USS Redfin (killing 86). On 9 November 1944, Shimotsu Maru was torpedoed and sunk by the USS Barbero (killing 39). The convoy was dissolved.

== Fate ==
On 11 April 1945 while conducting escort duty for auxiliary transport Agata Maru in the Andaman Sea 11 miles north east of the Nicobar Islands, she was attacked by Consolidated B-24 Liberator bombers of the Royal Air Force's No. 203 Squadron. Both ships were sunk at 09°21′N 93°00′E. CH-7 was removed from the Navy list on 25 May 1945.
