= Felix Andries Vening Meinesz =

Dutch geophysicist and geodesist

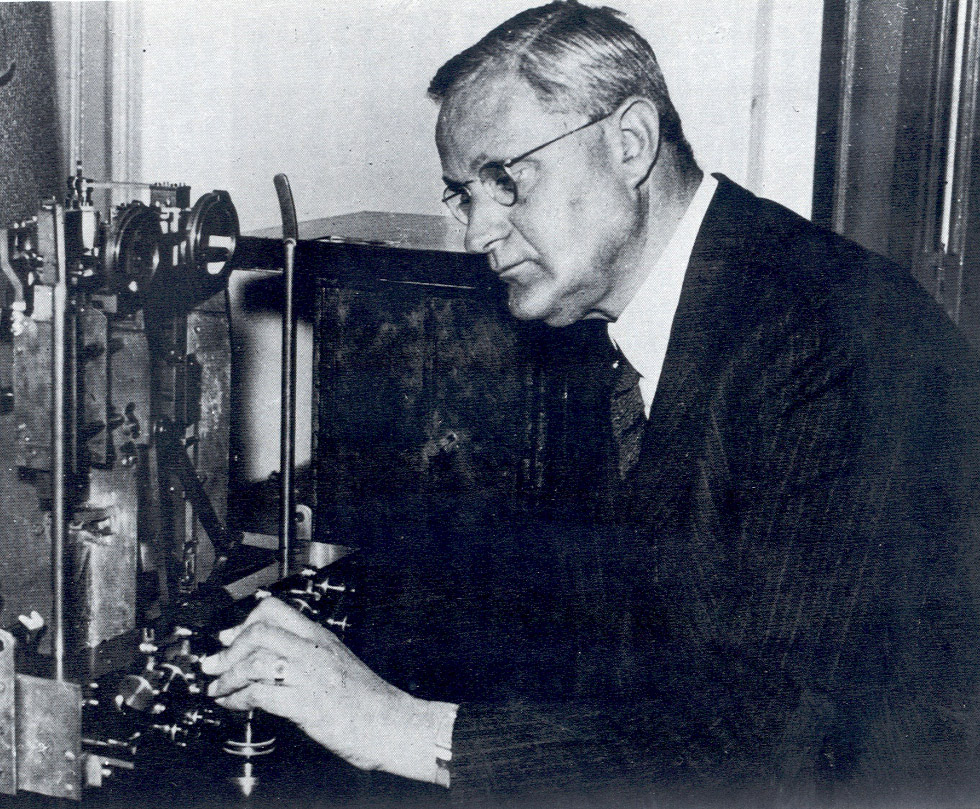
- Vening Meinesz with his gravimeter
- Born: 30 July 1887; The Hague
- Died: 10 August 1966 (aged 79); Amersfoort
- Known for: gravimeter Indian Ocean Geoid Low
- Awards: Howard N. Potts Medal (1936); Penrose Medal (1945); William Bowie Medal (1947); Alexander Agassiz Medal (1947); Vetlesen Prize (1962); Wollaston Medal (1963)
- Scientific career
- Fields: geophysics geodesy

Felix Andries Vening Meinesz (30 July 1887 – 10 August 1966) was a Dutch geophysicist and geodesist. He is known for his invention of a precise method for measuring gravity (gravimetry). Thanks to his invention, it became possible to measure gravity at sea, which led him to the discovery of gravity anomalies above the ocean floor. He later attributed these anomalies to continental drift. He was a Fellow of the Royal Society.

== Biography ==
Vening Meinesz's father, Sjoerd Anne Vening Meinesz, was mayor, first of Rotterdam, then of Amsterdam. Felix was born in The Hague and grew up in a protected environment. In 1910 he graduated in civil engineering in Delft. The same year he started working for the Dutch gravity survey. In 1915 he wrote his dissertation on the defects of the gravimeters used at that time.

Vening Meinesz then designed a new gravimeter, which the KNMI (Royal Dutch Meteorological Institute) built. The apparatus has two pendula of the same size hanging in a frame but moving in opposite phases. With mirrors and lightbeams the difference in amplitude of the two pendula is captured on a film. Vening Meinesz had discovered that horizontal accelerations (as by waves on a boat) had no influence on the difference in amplitude between the two pendula. The recorded difference then is the amplitude of a theoretical, undisturbed pendulum. Now it became possible to measure gravity more accurately. Vening Meinesz started with measuring gravity all over the Netherlands, for which a network of 51 monitoring stations was created. This became a success, which encouraged him to do measurements at sea. A perfected gravimeter, hanging in a "swing", was designed. The experiment was successful.

Now measuring gravity at sea had become possible. Between 1923 and 1929, the tall (over 2 metres) Vening Meinesz embarked in small submarines for some uncomfortable expeditions. His goal was to establish the exact shape of the geoid and the Earth. When his expedition with the submarine HNLMS K XVIII was made into a movie in 1935, Vening Meinesz became a hero of the Dutch cinema public. Besides, his research was in the international scientific spotlight. In 1927 he became a member of the Royal Netherlands Academy of Arts and Sciences. In 1927 he became a part-time professor in geodesy, cartography and geophysics at Utrecht University, and in 1937 he became professor at the Delft University of Technology as well. He was awarded the Howard N. Potts Medal in 1936, and several other major geology prizes in later years.

In World War II, Vening Meinesz was involved in the Dutch resistance. After the war he could take up his tasks as a professor again. From 1945 to 1951 he was the director of the KNMI. From 1948 to 1951, Vening Meinesz was President of the International Union of Geodesy and Geophysics. He retired in 1957, and died in Amersfoort in 1966.

== Research and discoveries ==
The vast amounts of data that his expeditions yielded were analyzed and discussed together with other leading Dutch Earth scientists of the time, J.H.F. Umbgrove, B.G. Escher and Ph.H. Kuenen. The results were published in 1948. An important result was the discovery of elongated belts of negative gravity anomalies along the oceanic trenches, along with a large circular anomaly that became known as the Indian Ocean Geoid Low. The mean gravity force appeared to be the same on land and at sea, which was in agreement with the principle of isostasy. Vening Meinesz was especially intrigued by the oceanic trenches. The coexistence of active volcanism, large negative gravity anomalies and the sudden difference in terrain elevation could only be explained by assuming the Earth's crust was somehow pushed together at these places. As a geophysicist, he was prejudiced that the crust was too rigid to deform at that scale in such a way. His discoveries could be explained only with the development of the theory of plate tectonics in the 1950s.

== Submarine expeditions ==
Vening Meinesz measured the gravity field of the Earth with his pendulum apparatus on board several submarines. The following expeditions are described in his publications, Gravity Expeditions at Sea:

Vol 1: 1923–1930

- HNLMS K II (1923)
- HNLMS K XI (1925)
- HNLMS K XIII (1926–1927)
- HNLMS K XIII (1928–1930)

Vol II: 1923–1933

- HNLMS O 13 (1932)

Vol III: 1934–1939

- HNLMS K XVIII (1934–1935)
- HNLMS O 16 (1937)
- HNLMS O 12 (1937)
- HNLMS O 13 (1938)
- HNLMS O 19 (1939)

Vening Meinesz was not on board during expeditions after 1939. His experiments were performed by his students. Vol V: 1948–1958

- HNLMS O 24 (1948–1949)
- HNLMS Tijgerhaai (1951)
- HNLMS Walrus (1957)
- HNLMS Vos (1955)
- HNLMS Zeeleeuw (1956)
- HNLMS Fret (1957)

== Legacy ==
Named after him are:

- a gravimeter, an apparatus to measure gravity
- a mathematical function used in geodesy
- a medal of the European Geophysical Society/European Geosciences Union
- a research school at Utrecht University
- the crater Vening Meinesz on the Moon.

== See also ==
- List of geophysicists

== Bibliography ==
- Chambon, Albert (1939). 100.000 zeemijl per onderzeeboot met professor Venig Meinesz. De Boer, Den Helder.
- F. A. Vening Meinesz (1932). Gravity Expeditions at Sea 1923–1930. Vol. I. The Expeditions, The Computations and the Results (PDF). Archived from the original (PDF) on 2016-07-18.
- F.A. Vening Meinesz; F.A.Heiskanen (1958). The Earth and Its Gravity Field. McGraw-Hill. ISBN 9780070280649.
- Sjoerd Anne; Vening Meinesz (July 17, 2009). Geschiedenis der staatsregtelijke bepalingen betrekkelijk de vervaardiging van wetten in algemeene. BiblioBazaar. ISBN 9781113081056.
- Sjoerd Anne; Vening Meinesz (2015). Geschiedenis der staatsregtelijke bepalingen betrekkelijk de vervaardiging ... 1856. Facsimile Publisher. ASIN B012AW918C.
- F.A. Vening Meinesz (1957). Gedenkboek F A Vening Meinesz. The Hague: Mouton. ASIN B006MYO1J4.
- F.A. Vening Meinesz (1928). Gravity Survey by Submarine via Panama to Java. The Hague: Mouton. ASIN B00KJ2F9XW.
- F.A. Vening Meinesz (2011). Geschiedenis Der Staatsregtelyke Bepalingen Betrekkelyk De Vervaardiging Van Wetten En Algemeene Beginselen Die Hierbij Behooren Te Gelden. Nabu Press. ISBN 9781270843009.
- F.A. Vening Meinesz. The earth and its gravity field by Heiskanen and Meinesz.
- F.A. Vening Meinesz (1958). Geschiedenis Der Staatsregtelyke Bepalingen Betrekkelyk De Vervaardiging Van Wetten En Algemeene Beginselen Die Hierbij Behooren Te Gelden. McGraw-Hill book company, inc. ASIN B000NR98TE.
- F.A. Vening Meinesz (1941). Theory and Practice of Pendulum Observations at Sea. Part II: Second order corrections, terms of Browne and miscellaneous subjects. Delft. ASIN B001C3VNUA.
- F.A. Vening Meinesz (1926). Theory and Practice of Pendulum Observations At Sea. Waltman Delft. ASIN B00CTUJOU6.
- F.A. Vening Meinesz (1941). The Gravity Measuring Cruise of the US Submarine S-21. With an Appendix of Computational Procedureby E Lamson. Washington: Government Printing Office. ASIN B006MYNYLA.
- F.A. Vening Meinesz (1923). Observation De Pendule Dans Les Pays-Bas 1913–1921. Waltman Delft. ASIN B00CTUUVAI.
- F.A. Vening Meinesz (1931). By Submarine Through the Netherlands East Indies + Gravity Anomalies in the East Indian Archipelago. Geographical Journal; 1st edition. ASIN B00KJ2FNKQ.
