= Military Canteen of Royal Netherlands Navy =

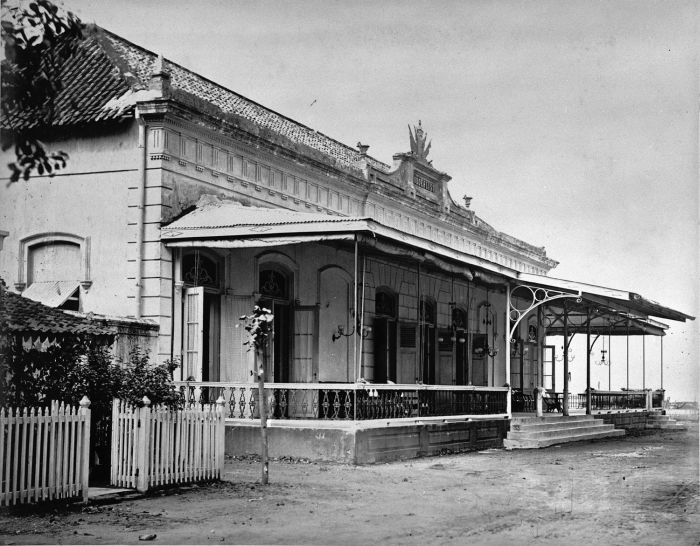
Late 19th century

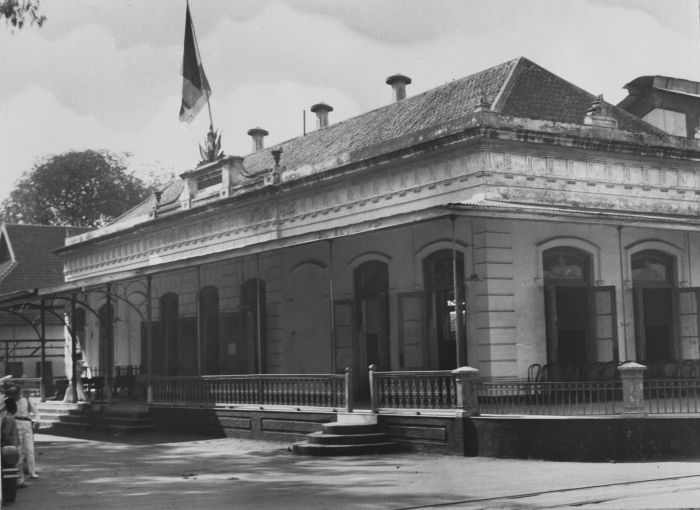
Circa 1929

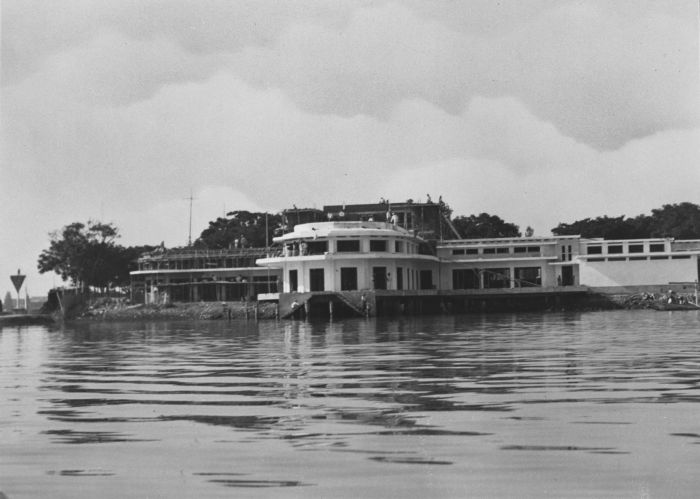
New building under construction circa 1930

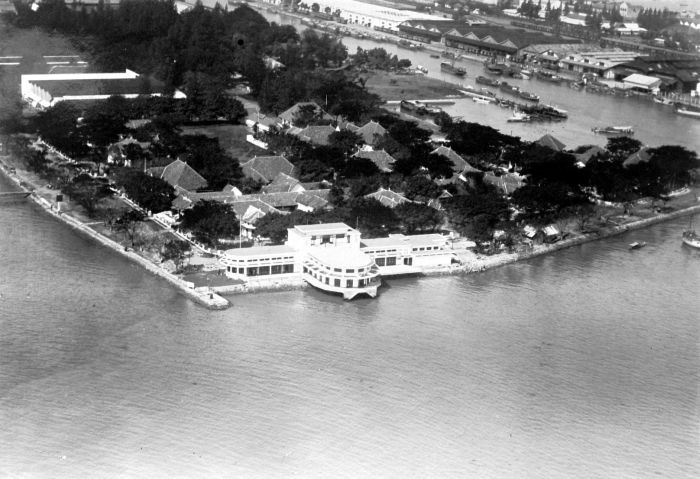
Aerial photo

The Military Canteen of Royal Netherlands Navy (also known as the Marine Societeit Moderlust Ujung) was built in Soerabaja, Dutch East Indies (present-day Surabaya, Indonesia) in 1890. The canteen was a place for socializing and was known as Marine Societeit "Moderlust" (Mud Lust) Ujung after May 1867.

The crew of submarine HNLMS K XVIII visited the canteen during their stay in Soerabaja in 1942. The sub was eventually scuttled ahead of the Japanese advance and was later raised by the Japanese as a "picket hulk" in the harbor. It was later sunk by HMS Taciturn.

Societeit clubs were popular in cities across the Dutch East Indies.
