= Japanese transport ship Kita Maru =

Steamship

- S.s. Gemma of the Gouvernementsmarine, 1930

History

Kingdom of the Netherlands
- Name: Gemma
- Builder: Gusto Shipyard (nl:Werf Gusto), Schiedam
- Launched: 1918
- Sponsored by: Gouvernementsmarine
- Fate: Scuttled, 2 March 1942

History

Empire of Japan
- Name: Kita Maru
- Acquired: repaired by the Empire of Japan, 1942
- Commissioned: 1 August 1943
- Homeport: Sasebo
- Fate: unknown
- Notes: Call sign: JWVY

General characteristics
- Class & type: Steamer
- Tonnage: 845 long tons (859 t) standard
- Length: 53.4 m (175 ft 2 in) overall
- Beam: 9.0 m (29 ft 6 in)
- Draught: 3.0 m (9 ft 10 in)
- Armament: 1 x 75 mm

Kita Maru (Japanese: 喜多丸) was a Dutch-built, steel-hulled steamship that was seized by the Imperial Japanese Navy during World War II and converted into an auxiliary transport.

== History ==
She was launched in 1918 at the Gusto Shipyard in Schiedam for the benefit of the Gouvernementsmarine and named Gemma. She was armed with a single 75 mm gun. She was scuttled by Dutch forces at Surabaya on 2 March 1942 after the Japanese occupation of the Dutch East Indies. On 27 October 1942, she was refloated and repaired by the No. 102 Naval Construction and Repair Department at Surabaya, Java. On 28 January 1943, her repairs were completed and on 1 August 1943, she was designated as a special transport ship, and assigned to the Sasebo Naval District. On 1 March 1944, she arrived at Surabaya as part of the Southern Expeditionary Fleet. She spent most of the war ferrying supplies and men and assisting disabled ships between ports in and around Indonesia (Kota Bharu, Surabaya, Balikpapan, and Samarinda). On 24 September 1944, she assisted the gunboat Nankai and the Hokkai Maru, disabled by enemy mines laid by the submarine USS Bowfin 15 miles west of Sebuku Island at 03°37′S 116°25′E.

She survived the war and was struck from the Navy List on August 15, 1945. Her last known port-of-call was Makassar.
