= HNLMS K XVII =

WW2 Dutch submarine KXVII

Coordinates: 3°10′N 104°12′E

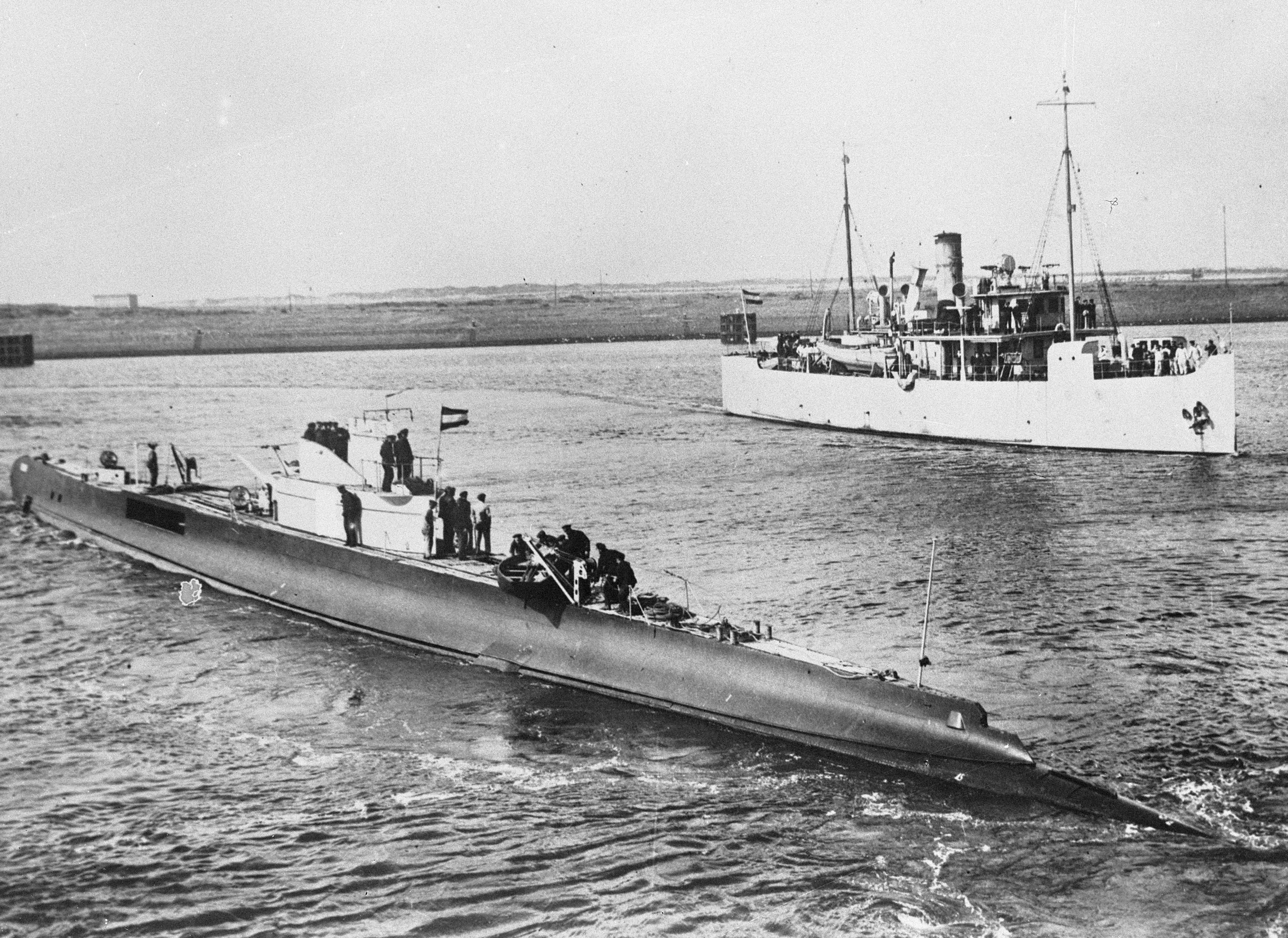
- K XVII together with minelayer HNLMS Medusa

History

Netherlands
- Name: K XVII
- Operator: Royal Netherlands Navy
- Builder: Wilton-Fijenoord
- Yard number: 332
- Laid down: 1 June 1931
- Launched: 26 July 1932
- Commissioned: 19 December 1933
- Home port: 1933–1935 Den Helder; 1935–1941 Surabaya
- Identification: 17
- Fate: Struck a naval mine on 21 December 1941

General characteristics
- Class & type: K XIV-class submarine
- Displacement: 865 tons surfaced; 1,045 tons submerged
- Length: 73.64 m (241 ft 7 in)
- Beam: 6.51 m (21 ft 4 in)
- Draught: 3.93 m (12 ft 11 in)
- Propulsion: 2 × 1,600 bhp (1,193 kW) diesel engines; 2 × 430 bhp (321 kW) electric motors
- Speed: 17 knots (31 km/h; 20 mph) surfaced; 9 knots (17 km/h; 10 mph) submerged
- Range: 10,000 nmi (19,000 km; 12,000 mi) at 12 kn (22 km/h; 14 mph) surfaced; 26 nmi (48 km; 30 mi) at 8.5 kn (15.7 km/h; 9.8 mph) submerged
- Complement: 38
- Armament: 4 × 21 inch bow torpedo tubes; 2 × 21 inch stern torpedo tubes; 2 × 21 inch external-traversing torpedo tubes forward of the conning tower; 1 x 88 mm gun; 2 x 40 mm guns

K XVII was one of five K XIV-class submarines built for the Royal Netherlands Navy. She served during World War II.

== Design ==
HNLMS K XVII was the last design of J.J. van der Struyff, a submarine designer and engineer of the Royal Netherlands Navy. K XVII had a similar design as her sister submarines in the K XIV class, she was fully riveted and her pressure hull was made of 14 mm (0.55 in) thick steel. To increase the submarine's seaworthiness the pressure hull was plated with 3 mm (0.12 in) thick steel. As a consequence K XVII was 200 tons heavier than submarines in the previous K XI class. However, this did allow K XVII to dive as deep as 80 to 100 m (260 to 330 ft), while withstanding the enormous water pressure. Between the plating and the pressure hull there was room for the ballast tanks, fuel tanks, anchor, torpedo tubes and more. Furthermore, the submarine was divided into six compartments. The first compartment at the front contained a room with four torpedo launchers which were loaded during wartime, while there were also four reserve torpedoes stored. The room also acted at the same time as sleeping accommodation and caboose for the crew. In the second and third compartments the batteries were stored, and also contained the sleeping accommodation for officers. The fourth compartment was the nerve center of K XVII, since this was the place where all control panels, instruments, and command tower were located. This tower was made of thick and pressure-resistant steel. The fifth compartment contained the machine chamber and thus the diesel motor. The sixth, and last, compartment was located at the back and had two torpedo launchers and the main electric motor. There was also space for two reserve torpedoes. The torpedo tubes of K XVII had a width of 53 cm (21 in). To enter the submarine, six water resistant shutters were built.

== Service history ==
=== Commissioning and serving in the Dutch East Indies ===
HNLMS K XVII was laid down in Rotterdam at the shipyard of Wilton-Fijenoord on 1 June 1931 together with her sister ship K XVIII. The submarine's launch took place on 26 July 1932 and on 19 December 1933 K XVII was commissioned in the Royal Netherlands Navy. As a K series submarine the purpose of K XVII was to be active in waters around the Dutch East Indies. However, before she left for the Dutch East Indies she first became part of the Royal Netherlands Navy escadre Oostzee between 20 June and 1 August 1934. Other ships that were part of this escadre were HNLMS Hertog Hendrik, Evertsen, Z 5 another K XIV-class submarine, namely K XVIII. As part of the navy escadre Oostzee, the K XVII made a trip to several ports and harbors connected to the Baltic Sea, such as Gdynia, Königsberg, Riga and Copenhagen.

On 7 January 1935 K XVII and her sister K XVI, were sent to the Dutch East Indies where they arrived on 26 March 1935 at Padang. During this trip both submarines were under command of LTZ1 J.A. de Gelder and visited several ports, such as Lisbon (14–18 January), Gibraltar (20 January), Naples (25–30 January), Alexandria (5–11 February), Port Said (12 February), Ismaila (12–13 February), Suez (13–15 February), Aden (23–28 February), Colombo (?-18 March) and finally, Padang (26 March). At every port which they visited more than two days meetings were organised and included showing the Dutch national flag as part of promoting the Netherlands. Alongside this 'Holland-promotion', the meetings also involved parties and dinners. The crew meanwhile made certain visits during their visits to the different ports. For example, the crew visited the Pyramid of Cheops while the ship was docked at the port in Alexandria, and also Vatican City was visited by the crew of K XVII while they were docked at the port in Naples.

On 4 April 1935 made both K XVII and K XVIII made it to their new home port in the Dutch West Indies, namely Surabaya. Here they were added to submarine division I. Later that year, in October 1935, this division took part in an exercises near Surabaya. After the exercises were finished all boats underwent maintenance, which took till 24 February 1936 to complete. Immediately after the maintenance periods were completed on all boats of submarine division I, they were ordered to be part of a navy escadre. The escadre would make an exercise trip to the west part of the Java Sea. The trip would last till mid-March, after which the escadre would change course to the Makassar Strait and spent the remainder of March practicing there. During April, May and June K XVII, as part of submarine division I, went on an exercise trip to the eastern part of the Indian archipelago.

From October 1936 till June 1937 the K XVII, and the rest of submarine division I, were once again part of a navy escadre. This time the escadre exercised for 8 months with sea planes. These exercises took place at the Makassar Strait and Java Sea. One year later, in January 1938, submarine division I, which included the submarines K XIV, K XIV, K XVI, K XVII and K XVIII were once again added to a navy escadre for exercises. The K XVII served this time as flag-ship of the submarine division, and was under command of LTZ 1 A. van Karnebeek, while LTZ 1 J.A. de Gelder had command of the whole submarine division I. The exercises were done at the Makassar Strait and Java Sea.

On 6 September 1938 the K XVII participated in a fleet show at Surabaya. The show was held in honor of the Dutch Queen Wilhelmina of the Netherlands who was than 40 years the head of state. More than twenty navy ships of the Royal Netherlands Navy and three ships of the Government Navy participated in the show.

=== World War II ===
When Germany declared war on the Netherlands and also started its war against other West-European nations, the Dutch navy gave the order for all submarines in the Dutch East Indies to protect the colony against possible attacks or raids by German or Italian auxiliary cruisers. At the same time, the Dutch navy also observed Japanese activity closely, especially after Japan had signed the Tripartite Pact with Italy and Germany. The K XVII was during this period mainly tasked with protecting merchant ships against raiders by either taking part in convoys or closely shadowing merchant ships. For example, on 15 September 1940 K XVII together with O 16 shadowed the steamship Lematang and the tanker Olivia on their trip to Durban and Lourenço Marques. They had the order to keep their eyes open for German raiders and attack them if spotted. At the end of September 1940 K XVII also protected the steamship Salando of the Rotterdam company Lloyd when it made its way through the Soenda Strait to reach its destination, Durban.

In March 1941 K XVII, alongside the submarines K IX and K X, was sent the Soenda Strait because of the 'Scheer-alarm'. The scheer-alarm meant that the German cruiser Admiral Scheer had been spotted. The Dutch navy believed, based on their intel, that Admiral Scheer was planning to enter the Indian Ocean with as goal to sink allied merchant ships and head towards Surabaya. The Dutch navy therefore made preparations to possibly face the Admiral Scheer and eventually sink the cruiser. The K IX, K X and K XVII were ordered to patrol around Sabang. However, the German cruiser did not enter the Indian Ocean and thus the submarines could resume with their normal patrols.

In June 1941 K XVII was sent alongside other ships, such as K XVIII and O 16, to north-west of the Dutch East Indies. There were reports of Japanese warships accompanying merchant ships to Southeast Asia, and the Dutch navy sent her own ships as a precaution to be ready for anything. After this assignment the K XVII was sent to Surabaya for her half yearly maintenance. At the end of July she was declared fit for service, and was taken back into service.

During the war K XVII patrolled in the South China Sea, off Malaya and in the Gulf of Siam. While exiting the Gulf of Siam in December 1941 she hit a Japanese mine and sunk. The entire crew of thirty-six men perished. One of the missing crew members was 28-year old Lieutenant Gerhard Kruys, member of a well-known Dutch Navy family. The wreck of the K XVII was located in 1978. In 2019, a scientific expedition discovered that the K XVII had disappeared.

There are several conspiracy theories involving K XVII and how the submarine allegedly sighted the Japanese fleet prior to attacking Pearl Harbor.
