= Sebuku =

Sebuku or Seboekoe can refer to either of the following islands.

- Sebuku (Sumatra), located near the island of Sumatra
- Sebuku (Borneo), located near the island of Borneo
