= CH-7 =

CH-7 may refer to:

- Japanese submarine chaser CH-7 (1938), Imperial Japanese Navy warship
- Heli-Sport CH-7, ultralight, kit-built helicopter
- CH-7 (UAV), a stealthy flying wing UCAV
