= Battle of Borneo =

Battle of Borneo may refer to two battles or campaigns of World War II:

- Battle of Borneo (1941-42)
- Borneo campaign (1945)
