= Taciturn =

Taciturn or Taciturnity may refer to:

- HMS Taciturn (P334), a British submarine of the third group of the T class
- Silence
- Abandonment (legal) (known as taciturnity in Scots law), failure to assert a legal right in a way that implies abandonment of the right
- William the Silent (also known as William the Taciturn), leader of the Dutch revolt against the Spanish Habsburgs that set off the Eighty Years' War
