= Shonan Maru =

Shonan Maru may refer to the following ships:

- Japanese submarine chaser Shonan Maru No. 17 (1940), World War II era Japanese submarine chaser
- Japanese submarine chaser Shonan Maru No. 7 (1938), World War II era Japanese submarine chaser
- MV Shōnan Maru 2, Japanese fisheries vessel built in 1972
