= Indian Ocean Geoid Low =

Gravity anomaly in the Indian Ocean

Coordinates: 2°N 76°E

The Indian Ocean Geoid Low (IOGL) is a gravity anomaly in the Indian Ocean. A circular region in the Earth's geoid, situated just south of the Indian peninsula, it is the Earth's largest gravity anomaly. It forms a depression in the sea level covering an area of about 3 million km^{2} (1.2 million sq mi), almost the size of India itself. Discovered in 1948 by Dutch geophysicist Felix Andries Vening Meinesz as a result of a ship's gravity survey, it remains largely a mystery. A May 2023 study presented a potential explanation for the weak local gravity through a hypothesis that used computer simulations and seismic data.

== Location, characteristics, and formation ==
The gravity anomaly, or "gravity hole", is centered southwest of Sri Lanka and Kanyakumari, the southernmost tip of mainland India, and east of the Horn of Africa. Due to weaker local gravity, the sea level in the IOGL would be up to 106 m (348 ft) lower than the global mean sea level (reference ellipsoid), if not for minor effects such as tides and currents in the Indian Ocean.

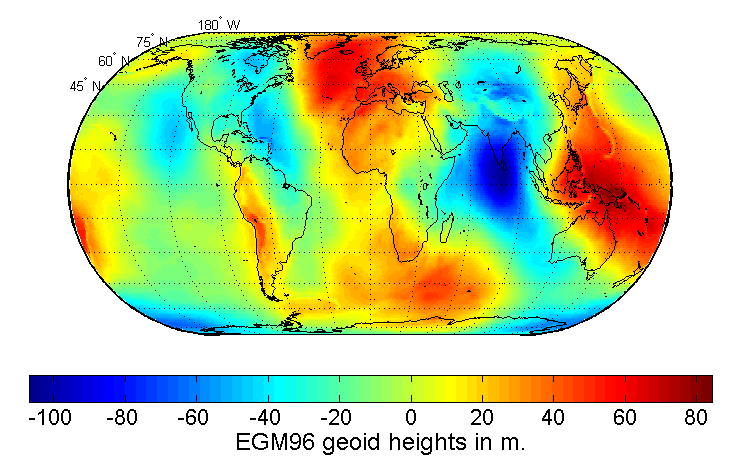
Impact of gravity anomalies on local sea level

=== Results from numerical models ===
As the Indian plate moved northward after splitting from the Gondwana supercontinent, the Tethys oceanic lithosphere that existed between India and Eurasia sank inside Earth's mantle. As this cold dense Tethys slab reached the bottom of the mantle, it churned the African LLVP (Large Low-Velocity Province), giving rise to mantle plumes of hot low-density material. These buoyant plumes rose to the upper mantle and the low-density material spread underneath the Indian Ocean region, forming the geoid low, according to research published in May 2023.

Because of this lower density, the gravitational pull in the IOGL region is currently measured to be weaker than normal by about 50 mgal (0.005%). The geoid low is believed to have formed around 20 million years ago.

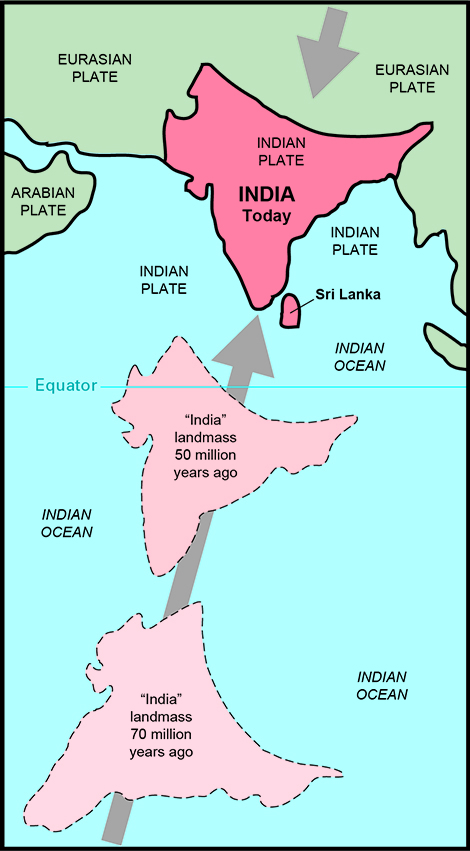
Approximate collision of Indian Plate into Central Asia
