= HMS Thorough =

Submarine of the Royal Navy

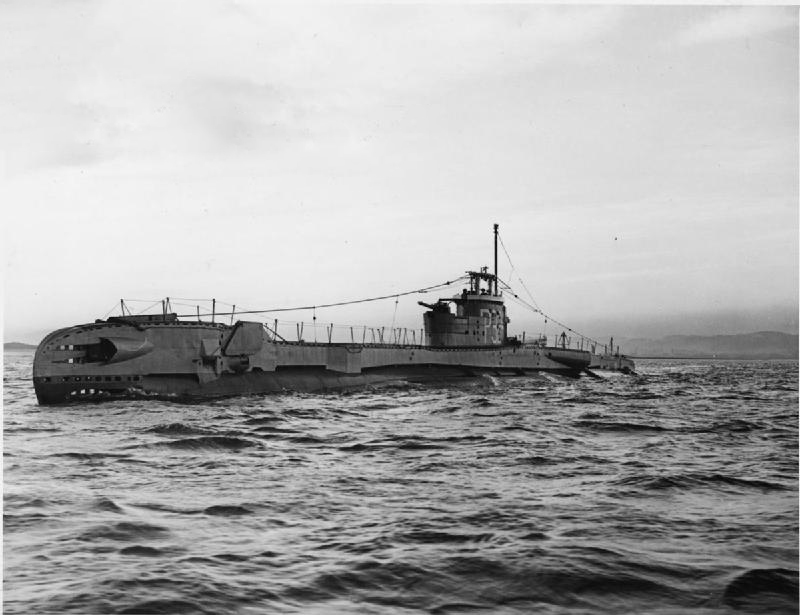
- HMS Thorough

History

United Kingdom
- Name: HMS Thorough
- Builder: Vickers-Armstrongs, Barrow
- Laid down: 26 October 1942
- Launched: 30 October 1943
- Commissioned: 1 March 1944
- Fate: Scrapped June 1962
- Badge

General characteristics
- Class & type: British T class submarine
- Displacement: 1,290 tons surfaced; 1,560 tons submerged
- Length: 276 ft 6 in (84.28 m)
- Beam: 25 ft 6 in (7.77 m)
- Draught: 12 ft 9 in (3.89 m) forward; 14 ft 7 in (4.45 m) aft
- Propulsion: Two shafts; Twin diesel engines 2,500 hp (1.86 MW) each; Twin electric motors 1,450 hp (1.08 MW) each
- Speed: 15.5 knots (28.7 km/h) surfaced; 9 knots (20 km/h) submerged
- Range: 4,500 nautical miles at 11 knots (8,330 km at 20 km/h) surfaced
- Test depth: 300 ft (91 m) max
- Complement: 61
- Armament: 6 internal forward-facing 21 inch (533 mm) torpedo tubes; 2 external forward-facing torpedo tubes; 2 external amidships rear-facing torpedo tubes; 1 external rear-facing torpedo tubes; 6 reload torpedoes; QF 4 inch (100 mm) deck gun; 3 anti aircraft machine guns

HMS Thorough was a British submarine of the third group of the T class. She was built as P324 by Vickers-Armstrongs, Barrow, and launched on 30 October 1943. So far she has been the only ship of the Royal Navy to bear the name Thorough.

== Service ==
Thorough served in the Far East for much of her wartime career, where she sank twenty seven Japanese sailing vessels, seven coasters, a small Japanese vessel, a Japanese barge, a small Japanese gunboat, a Japanese trawler, and the Malaysian sailing vessel Palange. In August 1945, in company with HMS Taciturn, she attacked Japanese shipping and shore targets off northern Bali. Thorough sank a Japanese coaster and a sailing vessel with gunfire.

On 16 December 1957 Thorough returned to HMS Dolphin, Portsmouth Dockyard, after completing the first circumnavigation by a submarine. While in Australian waters, on 2 August 1956, she rescued one of the four survivors of the sinking of the 'sixty-miler', Birchgrove Park.

She survived the war and continued in service with the Navy, finally being scrapped at Dunston on Tyne on 29 June 1962.
