= K XIV-class submarine =

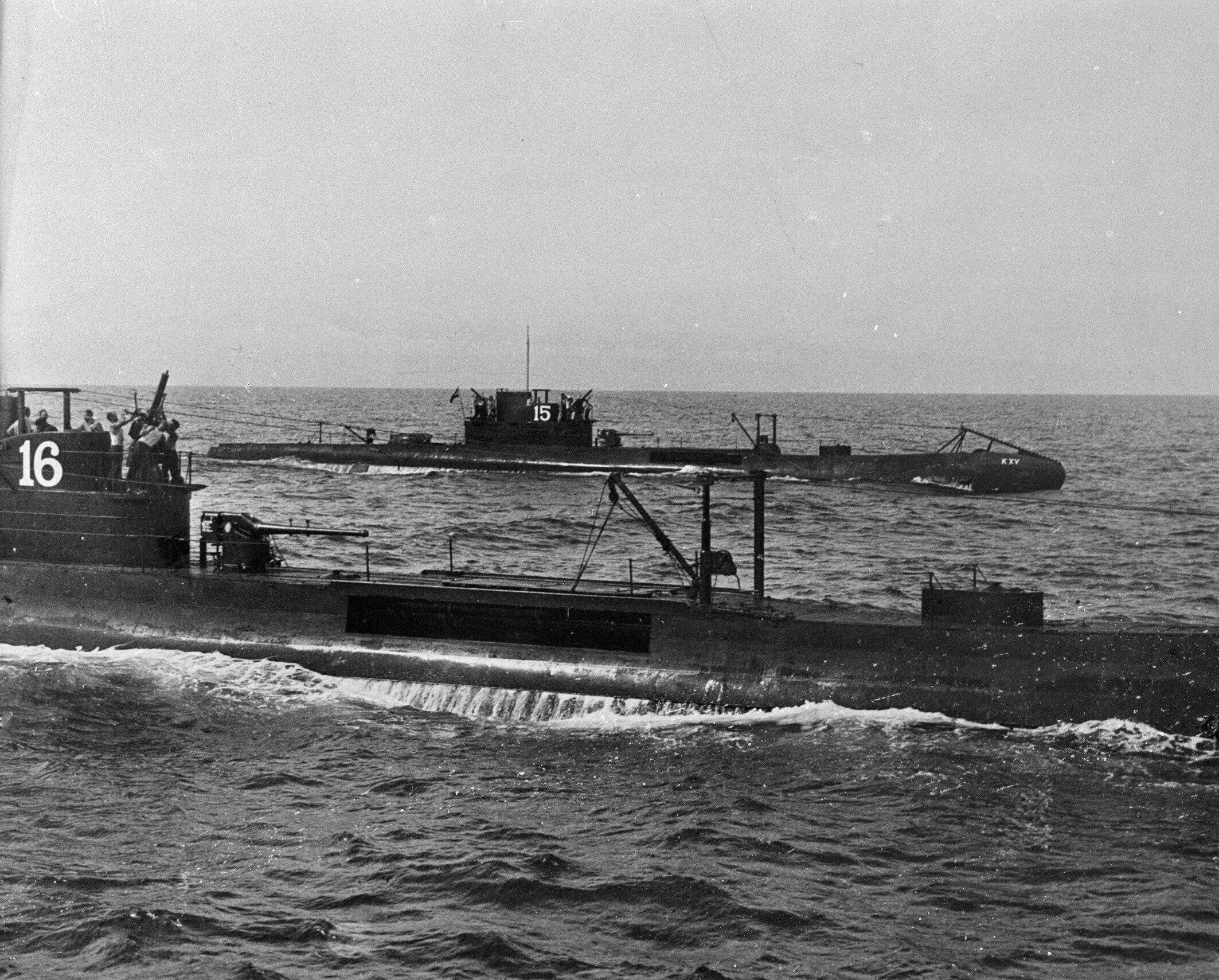
- K XV and K XVI

Class overview
- Name: K XIV class
- Builders: Rotterdamsche Droogdok Maatschappij (3); Wilton-Fijenoord (2)
- Operators: Royal Netherlands Navy
- Preceded by: K XI class
- Succeeded by: O 19 class
- Built: 1930–1934
- In commission: 1933-1946
- Completed: 5
- Lost: 3

General characteristics
- Type: Submarine
- Displacement: 865 tons surfaced; 1045 tons submerged
- Length: 73.64 m (241 ft 7 in)
- Beam: 6.51 m (21 ft 4 in)
- Draught: 3.93 m (12 ft 11 in)
- Propulsion: 2 shafts; 2 × 1,600 bhp (1,193 kW) diesel engines; 2 × 430 bhp (321 kW) electric motors; 192 cells batteries (4740 Ah)
- Speed: 17 kn (31 km/h; 20 mph) surfaced; 9 kn (17 km/h; 10 mph) submerged
- Range: 10,000 nmi (19,000 km; 12,000 mi) at 12 kn (22 km/h; 14 mph) on the surface; 26 nmi (48 km; 30 mi) at 8.5 kn (15.7 km/h; 9.8 mph) submerged
- Test depth: 80 m (260 ft)
- Complement: 38
- Armament: 4 × 21 inch bow torpedo tubes; 2 × 21 inch stern torpedo tubes; 2 × 21 inch external-traversing torpedo tubes forward of the conning tower; 1 x 88 mm deck gun; 2 x 40 mm AA guns

The K XIV class submarine was a class of submarines built for the Royal Netherlands Navy specifically to be used in Dutch colonial waters. (Note: The prefix K stood for colonial (Dutch: Koloniën), which meant that boats with this prefix were intended for service in the Dutch East Indies.) The class comprised five boats: K XIV, K XV, K XVI (all built by the Rotterdamsche Droogdok Maatschappij shipyard) and K XVII and K XVIII (which were built at the Wilton-Fijenoord shipyard). Three were lost in World War II.

== Design ==
The K XIV class submarines were the last submarine design made by Johannes van der Struijf, the chief engineer of the Royal Netherlands Navy, and were an improved and enlarged version of his previous K XI design. The submarines of the K XIV class were fully riveted and their pressure hulls were made of 14 mm thick steel with a further steel plating of a thickness of 3 mm to increase seaworthiness. As a consequence, the K XVIIs were 200 tonnes heavier than K XIs, but they could also dive 20 meters deeper (80 meters, as opposed to the 60 meter maximum rated diving depth of the K XIs. Between the plating and the pressure hull there was room for the ballast tanks, fuel tanks, anchor, torpedo tubes and more.

=== Armament ===
The primary armament of the K XIV class submarines consisted of eight torpedo tubes that had a width of 53.3 cm, which made the K XIV class the first Dutch K class that were equipped with solely 53.3 cm and no other torpedo tubes. There was room aboard for a total of fourteen torpedoes, with 8 being in the torpedo tubes and six in reserve. In addition, each boat was equipped with a single 8.8 cm deck gun and two 40 mm Vickers (Note: Noppen claims they were Bofors anti-aircraft guns.) anti-aircraft guns.

=== Propulsion ===
The K XIV class submarines were equipped with two 8-cylinder four-stroke MAN diesel engines that could produce a total of 3,200 shaft horsepower, giving the dual-screwed submarines a maximum surface speed of 17 knots. Besides the two diesel engines, the submarines also had two electric engines that each could produce 430 hp and 192 cells batteries with a capacity of 4740 Ah. This allowed the submarine to operate solely on electric power for 3 hours. The maximum underwater speed was 9 knots.

=== Sensors and processing systems ===
The submarines of the K XIV class were equipped with passive sonars made by the German firm Atlas-Werke. As part of this sonar system, the boats had two rows of six hydrophones, with one row being placed at the stern and the other row at the bow. The K XIV class was also the first submarine class that were equipped with a retractable radio antenna (in Dutch called radioperiscoop) which was installed behind the two normal periscopes. The retractable radio antenna used the same mechanism as a normal periscope to move upward and downward.

=== Layout ===
The submarines were divided into six compartments. The first compartment at the front contained a room with four torpedo launchers which were loaded during wartime, while there were also four reserve torpedoes stored. This room also acted as a sleeping accommodation, galley (kitchen) and mess for the crew. In the second and third compartments the batteries were stored, and also contained the sleeping accommodation for officers. The fourth compartment was the nerve center of the K XIV class submarines; all instruments and control panels were located here, along with the command tower, which was made of thick, pressure-resistant steel. The fifth compartment housed the diesel engine room, while the sixth compartment, located at the back, contained the electric engine room and housed two rear-facing torpedo tubes with space for two reserve torpedoes. Six watertight and secure deck hatches were built. The submarines also featured one external and trainable twin-mount amidships that hosted two further torpedo tubes.

=== Modifications ===
Between December 1942 and May 1943, the K XIV and K XV underwent a major refit at the Philadelphia Naval Shipyard in which both bridges were reconstructed, resulting in the loss of their forward 40 mm anti-aircraft guns and the externally-moounted (traversing) torpedo tubes. The side-view of the modernized boats now showed great resemblance with the boats of the O 21 class.

K XIV class construction data
Name	Laid down	Launched	Commissioned	Decommissioned
K XIV	31 May 1930	11 July 1931	6 July 1933	23 April 1946
K XV	31 May 1930	10 December 1932	30 December 1933	1 June 1946
K XVI	31 May 1930	8 April 1933	30 Januari 1934	25 December 1941 (sunk by I 66).
K XVII	1 June 1931	26 July 1932	19 December 1933	21 December 1941 (struck by a mine).
K XVIII	10 June 1931	27 September 1932	23 March 1934	2 March 1942 (scuttled later raised by the Japanese to be converted into an air warning picket hulk). 16 June 1945 (sunk by HMS Taciturn).
