= HNLMS K XVIII =

Coordinates: 06°48′S 112°47′E

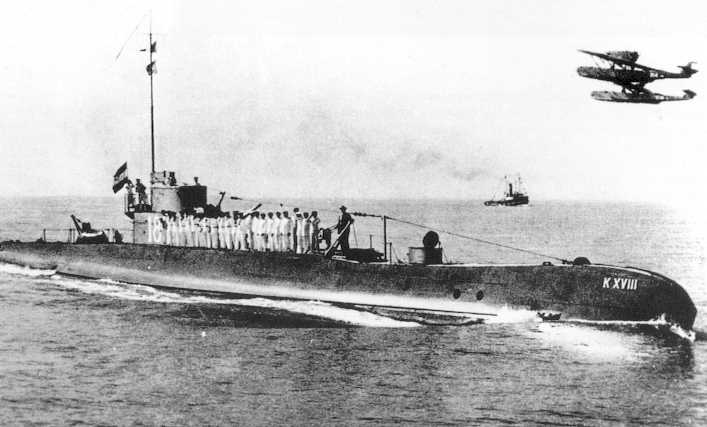
- K XVIII

History

Netherlands
- Name: K XVIII
- Builder: Fijenoord, Rotterdam
- Laid down: 10 June 1931
- Launched: 27 September 1932
- Commissioned: 23 March 1934
- Fate: Scuttled on 2 March 1942 - wreck was later refloated and used as a picket hulk Sunk on 16 June 1945

General characteristics
- Class & type: K XIV-class submarine
- Displacement: 865 tons surfaced; 1045 tons submerged
- Length: 73.64 m (241 ft 7 in)
- Beam: 6.51 m (21 ft 4 in)
- Draught: 3.93 m (12 ft 11 in)
- Propulsion: 2 × 1,600 bhp (1,193 kW) diesel engines; 2 × 430 bhp (321 kW) electric motors
- Speed: 17 kn (31 km/h; 20 mph) surfaced; 9 kn (17 km/h; 10 mph) submerged
- Range: 10,000 nmi (19,000 km; 12,000 mi) at 12 kn (22 km/h; 14 mph) on the surface; 26 nmi (48 km; 30 mi) at 8.5 kn (15.7 km/h; 9.8 mph) submerged
- Complement: 38
- Armament: 4 × 21-inch bow torpedo tubes; 2 × 21-inch stern torpedo tubes; 2 × 21-inch external-traversing torpedo tubes forward of the conning tower; 1 x 88 mm gun; 2 x 40 mm guns

K XVIII was one of five K XIV-class submarines built for the Royal Netherlands Navy. She served during World War II.

== Service history ==
The submarine was laid down in Rotterdam at the shipyard of Fijenoord on 10 June 1931. The launch took place on 27 September 1932. On 23 March 1934 the boat was commissioned in the Dutch navy. From 20 June to 1 August 1934 K XVIII, K XVII, Hertog Hendrik, Evertsen and Z 5 made a trip to the Baltic Sea. The ports of Gdynia, Königsberg, Riga and Copenhagen were visited.

On 14 November 1934 the boat was sent to the Dutch East Indies, where she arrived on 11 July 1935 in Surabaya. During this journey Felix Andries Vening Meinesz conducted gravity measurements, as he had previously done aboard the USS S-21 in the Caribbean. The ports visited on this voyage were Funchal in Portugal, St. Vincent in Cape Verde, Dakar in Senegal, Pernambuco and Rio de Janeiro in Brazil, Montevideo in Uruguay, Buenos Aires and Mar del Plata in Argentina, Tristan da Cunha, Cape Town and Durban in South Africa, Port Louis in Mauritius, and Fremantle in Australia.

On 6 September 1938 she participated in a fleet show at Surabaya. The show was held in honor of the Dutch Queen Wilhelmina of the Netherlands who celebrating her fortieth year as head of state. More than twenty navy ships participated in the show.

In the war K XVIII sank several Japanese ships. On 24 January 1942 the boat attacked the submarine chaser CH-12, but the torpedo ran too low as Ch-12 counter attacked with depth charges and badly damaged K XVIII. While still under repair at Surabaya she was scuttled on 2 March 1942 in order to prevent the Japanese from capturing the boat. K XVIII was raised by the Japanese in 1944 and converted into an air warning picket hulk and deployed in the Madura Strait. On 16 June 1945 the hulk was sunk by the British submarine Taciturn.

=== Summary of raiding history ===
Ships sunk and damaged by K XVIII.

Date	Ship name	Nationality/Type	Tonnage (GRT)	Fate
23 January 1942	?	Japanese destroyer	1400	Sunk
23/24 January 1942	Tsuruga Maru	Japanese cargo ship	6988	Sunk
24 January 1942	P 37 or # 12	Japanese patrol boat or Submarine Chaser	935 or 291	Damaged
