= Japanese transport ship Unyo Maru No. 2 =

Japanese cargo ship

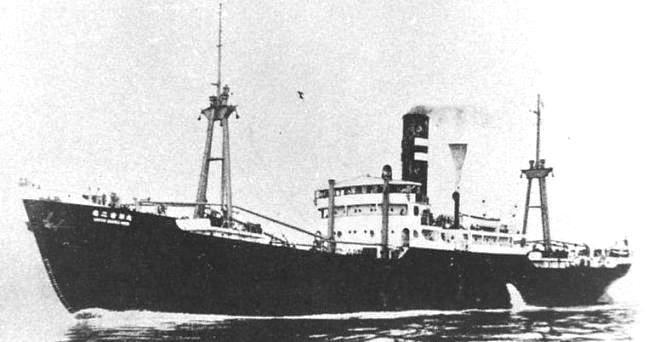
- Unyo Maru No. 2 prior to the Pacific War

History

Empire of Japan
- Name: Unyo Maru No. 2
- Owner: Nakamura Kisen K.K.
- Port of registry: Kobe, Japan
- Builder: Mitsui Bussan Kaisha K.K., Tamano
- Yard number: 232
- Laid down: 22 March 1937
- Launched: 25 July 1937
- Completed: 6 August 1937
- In service: 1937–1941
- Fate: Requisitioned by the Imperial Japanese Navy as an auxiliary transport ship, 2 November 1941

Empire of Japan
- Name: Unyo Maru No. 2
- Operator: Imperial Japanese Navy
- Acquired: 2 November 1941
- In service: 1941
- Homeport: Yokosuka, Japan
- Fate: Sunk by Dutch bombers off Kuching, 26 December 1941

General characteristics
- Tonnage: 2,827 gross register tons (GRT)
- Length: 94 m (308 ft) between perpendiculars
- Beam: 13.7 m (45 ft)
- Draught: 7.2 m (24 ft)
- Installed power: 1,900 bhp (1,400 kW)
- Propulsion: 1 shaft, triple-expansion steam engine
- Speed: 11 knots (20 km/h; 13 mph) cruising; 13 knots (24 km/h; 15 mph) max
- Armament: Unknown

Unyo Maru No. 2 was a Japanese cargo ship. Launched in 1937, the ship was requisitioned by the Imperial Japanese Navy in November 1941, a month before the outbreak of the Pacific War. The ship was assigned as a transport and took part in the landings at Sarawak and Kuching, delivering supplies and equipment. On 26 December 1941, while off Kuching, Unyo Maru No. 2 was attacked by Dutch Air Force bombers; the cargo ship was sunk with the loss of eight crew aboard.

== Construction and design ==
Unyo Maru No. 2 was constructed in Tamano by Mitsui Bussan K.K for her owners, Nakamura Kisen K.K. The cargo ship measured 2,827 gross register tons (GRT) and featured a length of 94 m (308 ft) between perpendiculars, a beam of 13.7 m (45 ft), and a draft of 23.6 ft (7.2 m). Unyo Maru No. 2 could sail at a cruising speed of 11 knots (20 km/h; 13 mph) and a maximum speed of 13 knots (24 km/h; 15 mph), and was powered by a 1,900 brake horsepower (1,400 kW) triple-expansion steam engine. The cargo ship was laid down on 22 March 1937, launched on 25 July, and was completed and registered in Kobe on 6 August.

== History ==
=== Second World War ===
Unyo Maru No. 2 was requisitioned by the Imperial Japanese Navy on 2 November 1941, just over a month before the outbreak of the Pacific War. She began a 20-day military conversion at Yokosuka Naval Yard on 6 November and was ultimately registered with the navy on 10 November. Unyo Maru No. 2 was assigned to the Yokosuka Naval District as an auxiliary transport ship on 26 November 1941, but it almost immediately sailed for Indochina to take part in the invasion of Borneo.

On 13 December 1941, the invasion force departed from Cam Ranh Bay, Indochina to attack Sarawak. The naval forces, commanded by Vice Admiral Nobutake Kondō, escorted the army group under General Hisaichi Terauchi. Unyo Maru No. 2, carrying equipment and supplies for the naval force, arrived at Lutong on 15 December and stayed there for the remainder of the invasion, which succeeded without much resistance from the British defenders. On 22 December, the main body of the Japanese naval force, including Unyo Maru No. 2, disembarked Japanese troops at Miri and sailed for Kuching to commence the second phase of the invasion of Borneo. The convoy arrived off Kuching two days later and supported the attack on the town, all the while being harassed by Dutch bombers and submarines. During one such attack, a bombing raid by three Dutch Air Force Martin B-10 bombers on 26 December, Unyo Maru No. 2 was set on fire by bombs and sunk, killing eight crewmen. The cargo ship was struck from the navy list on 15 January 1942.
