= Japanese submarine chaser Shonan Maru No. 7 =

Japanese whaling ship that was converted into a submarine chaser

History

Empire of Japan
- Name: Shonan Maru No. 7
- Namesake: Singapore
- Owner: Nippon Suisan K.K.
- Builder: K.K. Osaka Tekkosho Innoshima Kojo
- Laid down: 26 March 1938
- Launched: 3 August 1938
- Completed: 18 September 1938
- Acquired: requisitioned by Imperial Japanese Navy, 13 September 1941
- Stricken: 10 July 1944
- Home port: Tokyo
- Identification: 47836
- Fate: Sunk by torpedo, 21 May 1944
- Notes: Call sign: JYJN

General characteristics
- Class & type: whaling ship
- Tonnage: 355 gross register tons
- Length: 40.6 m (133 ft 2 in) o/a
- Beam: 8.2 m (26 ft 11 in)
- Draught: 4.5 m (14 ft 9 in)
- Propulsion: Steam

Shonan Maru No. 7 (Japanese: 第七昭南丸) was a Japanese whaling ship that was requisitioned by the Imperial Japanese Navy during World War II and converted into an auxiliary subchaser.

== History ==
She was laid down on 26 March 1938 at the K.K. Osaka Tekkosho Innoshima Kojo shipyard for the benefit of Nippon Suisan K.K. She was launched on 3 August 1938, completed on 18 September 1938, and registered in Tokyo. She was the 8th of 13 Shonan Maru No. 1-class ships built 1938-1940 all sharing the same name (Shonan is the Japanese name for Singapore). The ships of the class in order of production were: Shonan Maru No. 1 (第一昭南丸), Shonan Maru No. 2 (第二昭南丸), Shonan Maru No. 3 (第三昭南丸), Shonan Maru No. 5 (第五昭南丸), Shonan Maru No. 10 (第十昭南丸), Shonan Maru No. 11 (第十一昭南丸), Shonan Maru No. 6 (第六昭南丸), Shonan Maru No. 7 (第七昭南丸), Shonan Maru No. 8 (第八昭南丸), Shonan Maru No. 12 (第十二昭南丸), Shonan Maru No. 15 (第十五昭南丸), Shonan Maru No. 16 (第十六昭南丸), and Shonan Maru No. 17 (第十七昭南丸). She worked as a whaling ship until 13 September 1941, when she was requisitioned by the Imperial Japanese Navy.

She was designated as an auxiliary submarine chaser at the Kure Naval District and her conversion was completed at the Innoshima, Hiroshima shipyard of Osaka Iron Works on 24 October 1941. Her commanding officer was Reserve Lieutenant (J.G.) Suzuki Kanji (鈴木完爾). She was attached to the 91st Subchaser Division (along with auxiliary subchaser Shonan Maru No. 6 and auxiliary netlayer Choko Maru), 9th Base Force, Southern Expeditionary Fleet, Combined Fleet. The 9th Base Force was based at Cam Rahn Bay, French Indochina which had been seized from the French in September 1940. On 3 January 1942, the Combined Fleet in anticipation of having to defend its newly acquired territories, reorganized. The Southern Expeditionary Fleet was renamed the 1st Expeditionary Fleet and tasked with defending French Indochina, Singapore, Thailand, and Burma; and the 2nd Southern Expeditionary Fleet was formed out of the Third Fleet and tasked with defending the Dutch West Indies. On 10 April 1942, the 1st, 2nd, and 3rd Expeditionary Fleets (created on 3 January 1942 and responsible for the Philippines) were placed under the unified command of the Southwest Area Fleet headquartered in Manila. The 1st Expeditionary Fleet (headquartered in Singapore) consisted of the 9th Base Force (Penang), the 10th Base Force (Singapore); the 11th base Force (Saigon), and the 12th Base Force (Andaman Islands).

=== Reinforcement of Burma ===
On 19 March 1942, she departed Singapore as part of "Operation U" tasked with the reinforcement of Japanese troops in Burma. The convoy was escorted by the three ships of the 91st Subchaser Division along with 2 additional subchasers (CH-7, CH-8), a light cruiser Kashii (which served as flagship), five destroyers (Shikinami, Asakaze, Harukaze, Hatakaze, and Matsukaze); an escort ship (Shimushu); a minelayer (Hatsutaka), 3 minesweepers (W-1, W-3, W-4); a gunboat (Eiko Maru); an Ōtori-class torpedo boat (Kari), and an auxiliary gunboat (Kosho Maru). The warships escorted the First Burma Transport Convoy consisting of 32 transports carrying the main body of the Imperial Japanese Army's 56th Division.

Thereafter, she was assigned to Singapore where she was mainly involved in escort and patrol duties.

=== Demise ===
There is some disagreement over her fate. Japanese sources indicate that on 21 May 1944, while conducting anti-submarine sweeps along the east coast of Malaysia, she was torpedoed and sunk 17 km southeast of Pangkor Island (04°03′N 100°37′E) and that on 10 July 1944, she was struck from the Navy List. US sources indicate that she was sunk after being attacked by aircraft from Task Force 38 off the cost of Luzon on 22 September 1944.
