= HNLMS Zeeleeuw =

Two submarines of the Royal Netherlands Navy have borne the name HNLMS Zeeleeuw (S803), in honor of the Sea lion. (Both were assigned the same pennant number, so they are distinguished by an ordinal number.)

- HNLMS Zeeleeuw (1) was originally USS Hawkbill, a U.S. Navy Balao-class submarine, launched in 1944 and decommissioned in 1946. The ship was loaned to the Netherlands in 1953; she was commissioned in the Royal Netherlands Navy as HNLMS Zeeleeuw (S803). In 1970, Zeeleeuw was sold for scrap.
- HNLMS Zeeleeuw (2) is a Walrus-class submarine, launched in 1987 and still in service as of May 2023.
