= HNLMS K XIII =

Dutch patrol submarine

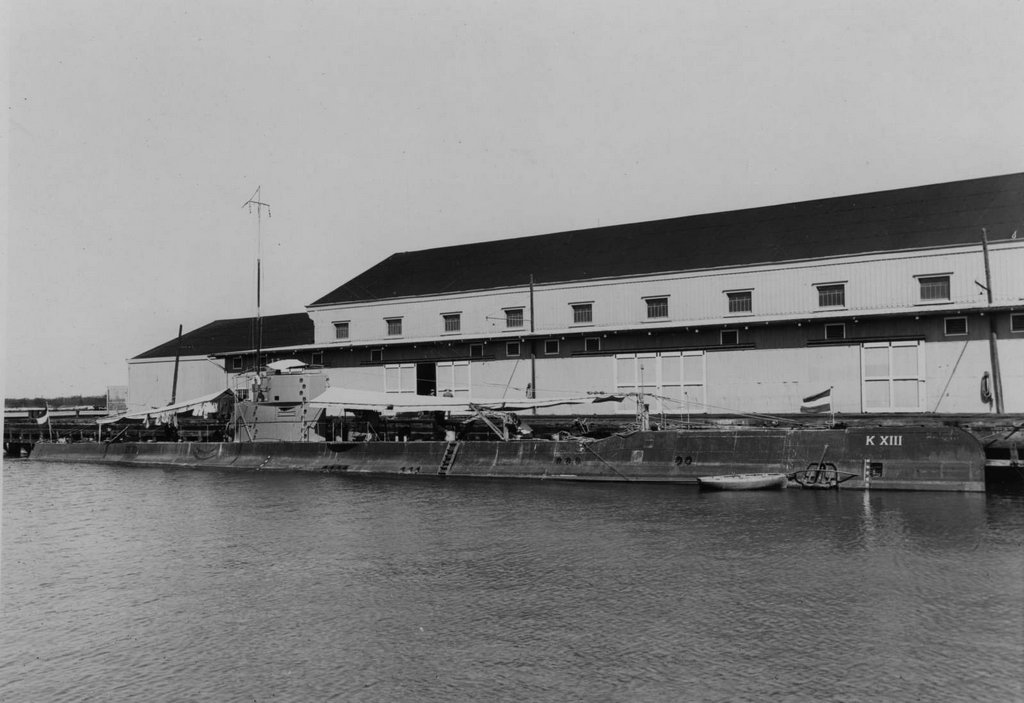
- K XIII in 1926

History

Netherlands
- Name: K XIII
- Builder: Fijenoord, Rotterdam
- Laid down: 15 October 1923
- Launched: 23 December 1924
- Commissioned: 29 March 1926
- Fate: Scuttled on 2 March 1942

General characteristics
- Class & type: K XI-class submarine
- Displacement: 688 tons surfaced; 828 tons submerged
- Length: 66.7 m (218 ft 10 in)
- Beam: 6.15 m (20 ft 2 in)
- Draught: 3.78 m (12 ft 5 in)
- Propulsion: 2 × 1,200 bhp (895 kW) diesel engines; 2 × 327 bhp (244 kW) electric motors
- Speed: 17 kn (31 km/h; 20 mph) surfaced; 8 kn (15 km/h; 9.2 mph) submerged
- Range: 3,500 nmi (6,500 km; 4,000 mi) at 8 kn (15 km/h; 9.2 mph) on the surface; 25 nmi (46 km; 29 mi) at 8 kn (15 km/h; 9.2 mph) submerged
- Complement: 31
- Armament: 2 × 21 in (533 mm) bow torpedo tubes; 2 × 17.7 in (450 mm) bow torpedo tubes; 2 × 17.7 in (450 mm) stern torpedo tubes; 1 x 88 mm Bofors gun; 1 x 12.7 mm machine gun

K XIII was a K XI class patrol submarine of the Royal Netherlands Navy. The ship was built by Fijenoord shipyard in Rotterdam.

== Service history ==
The submarine was ordered on 3 September 1921 and laid down in Rotterdam at the shipyard of Fijenoord on 15 October 1923. The launch took place on 23 December 1924. On 29 March 1926 the boat was commissioned in the Dutch navy.

On 27 May 1926 K XIII left Den Helder for the Dutch East Indies. Onboard was professor F.A. Vening Meinesz, who was to conduct gravity measurements. The submarine made the journey alone and took a route that led by Horta, Willemstad, Mazatlán, San Francisco, Honolulu, Guam, Yap, Manila, Ambon and Burma. She arrived in Surabaya on 13 December 1926.

The following years she made several trips to conduct gravity measurements for professor F.A. Vening Meinesz's research. Destinations were Christmas Island, the Gulf of Boni, the Makassar Strait and Sumatra.

On 6 September 1938 she participated in a fleet review at Surabaya. The review was held in honour of the Dutch Queen Wilhelmina of the Netherlands who was than 40 years the head of state. More than twenty navy ships participated in the review.

=== World War II ===
K XIII patrolled from 7–16 December 1941 in the South China Sea and off Malaya. During this patrol the Netherlands declared war on Japan. An unsuccessful attack was made on the Japanese invasion fleet on 10 December 1941 of the north east coast of Malaya.

The boat was damaged as a result of a battery explosion in the Singapore harbor on 21 December 1941. Three men were killed in the explosion. Afterwards K XIII returned to Surabaya for repairs and was escorted by the destroyer Van Nes where they arrived on 6 January 1942.

Still under repairs the boat was scuttled to prevent her being captured by the invading Japanese forces on 2 March 1942.
