= HNLMS K XIV =

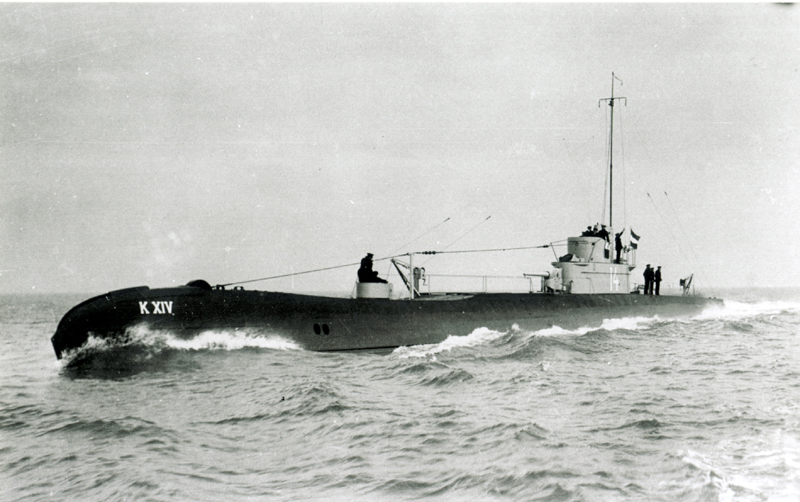
- K XIV

History

Netherlands
- Name: K XIV
- Builder: Rotterdamsche Droogdok Maatschappij
- Yard number: RDM-167
- Laid down: 31 May 1930
- Launched: 11 July 1931
- Commissioned: 6 July 1933
- Decommissioned: 23 April 1946
- Fate: Unknown

General characteristics
- Class & type: K XIV-class submarine
- Displacement: 865 tons surfaced; 1045 tons submerged
- Length: 73.64 m (241 ft 7 in)
- Beam: 6.51 m (21 ft 4 in)
- Draught: 3.93 m (12 ft 11 in)
- Propulsion: 2 × 1,600 bhp (1,193 kW) diesel engines; 2 × 430 bhp (321 kW) electric motors
- Speed: 17 kn (31 km/h; 20 mph) surfaced; 9 kn (17 km/h; 10 mph) submerged
- Range: 10,000 nmi (19,000 km; 12,000 mi) at 12 kn (22 km/h; 14 mph) on the surface; 26 nmi (48 km; 30 mi) at 8.5 kn (15.7 km/h; 9.8 mph) submerged
- Complement: 38
- Armament: 4 × 21 inch bow torpedo tubes; 2 × 21 inch stern torpedo tubes; 2 × 21 inch external-traversing torpedo tubes forward of the conning tower; 1 x 88 mm gun; 2 x 40 mm guns (replaced with 1 x 20 mm gun during WWII)

K XIV was one of five K XIV-class submarines built for the Royal Netherlands Navy. She served during World War II.

== Service history ==
The submarine was laid down in Rotterdam at the shipyard of Rotterdamsche Droogdok Maatschappij on 31 May 1930. The launch took place on 11 July 1931. On 6 July 1933 the boat was commissioned in the Dutch navy.

On 7 February 1934 K XIV and K XV left the Netherlands for the Dutch East Indies. The route they took led through the Suez Canal. On 6 September 1938 she took part in a fleet show at Surabaya. The show was held in honour of the Dutch Queen Wilhelmina of the Netherlands who celebrating her 40th year as head of state. More than 20 navy ships participated in the show.

During the Second World War K XIV attacked a Japanese invasion convoy that was landing troops on 23 December 1941, at the mouth of the Santubong River in western Sarawak. The convoy reached the river mouth about 1800 hrs and started to put troops ashore. At either 2040 hrs or 2240 hrs (sources differ), K XIV torpedoed four ships. Katori Maru and another troop ship, Hiyoshi Maru (also called Hie Maru), were sunk at position 02°30′N 110°00′E and the transport ships Hokkai Maru and another ship, either Tonan Maru No. 3 or Nichiran Maru, were damaged. Hokkai Maru was so heavily damaged that she was grounded to avoid sinking, but was later refloated and repaired.

On 1 March 1942, K XIV made visual contact with the Japanese cruiser Yura and attacked, launching two torpedoes from 2,500 to 3,000 metres (2,700 to 3,300 yd), but both either missed or were duds. The Japanese made six depth charge attacks, dropping about 25 depth charges, but K XIV survived and escaped via the Sunda Strait to Colombo, Ceylon.

K XIV survived the war and was decommissioned on 23 April 1946. On 1 June 1946 she was stricken.

=== Summary of raiding history ===
Ships sunk and damaged by K XIV.

Date	Name	Nationality/Type	Tonnage (GRT)	Fate
23 December 1941	Katori Maru	Japanese troopship	9,848	Sunk
23 December 1941	Hie/Hiyoshi Maru	Japanese troopship	4,943	Sunk
23 December 1941	Hokkai Maru	Japanese troopship	8,416	Damaged
23 December 1941	Nichiran Maru or Ninchinan Maru	Japanese tanker/troopship	6,503	Damaged
23 December 1941	Tonan Maru No. 3	Japanese transport	19,210	Damaged
20 June 1944	Tsugaru	Japanese minelayer	4,400	Damaged
23 June 1944	Dornia Maru	Japanese landing craft	10	Sunk
10 May 1945	?	Sampan	10	Sunk
9 June 1945	?	Sampan	10	Sunk
9 June 1945	?	Sampan	10	Sunk
