= K XI-class submarine =

Dutch submarines (1922–1945)

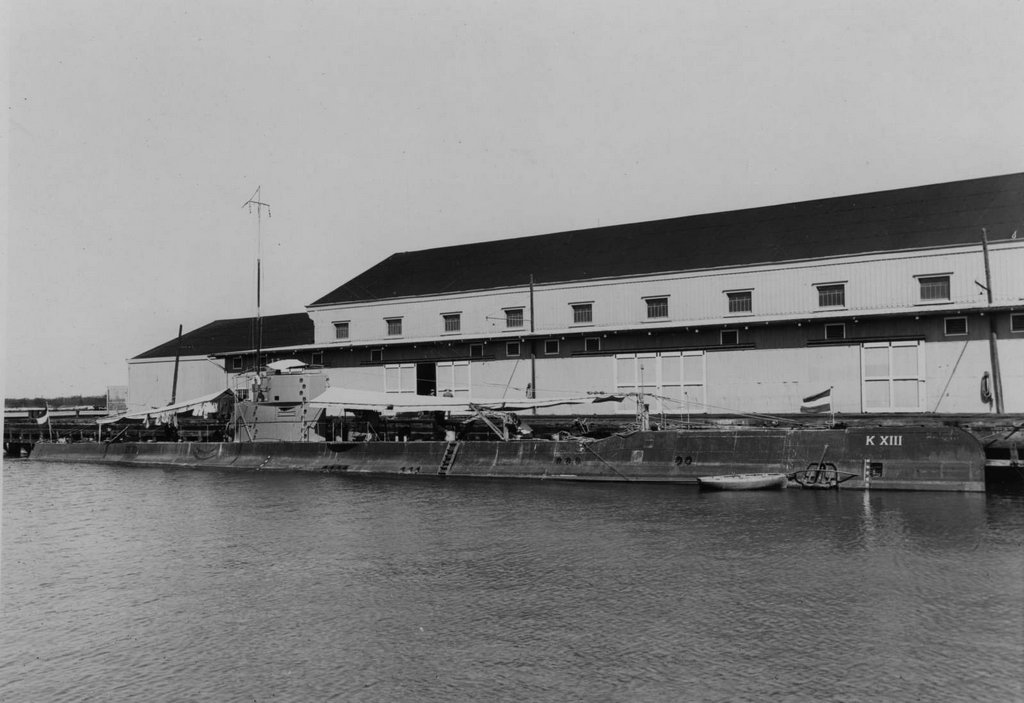
- HNLMS K XIII

Class overview
- Name: K XI class
- Builders: Fijenoord, Rotterdam
- Operators: Royal Netherlands Navy
- Preceded by: K VIII class
- Succeeded by: K XIV class
- Built: 1922-1926
- Completed: 3

General characteristics
- Type: Submarine
- Displacement: 688 tons surfaced; 828 tons submerged
- Length: 66.7 m (218 ft 10 in)
- Beam: 6.15 m (20 ft 2 in)
- Draught: 3.78 m (12 ft 5 in)
- Propulsion: 2 × 1,200 bhp (895 kW) diesel engines; 2 × 327 bhp (244 kW) electric motors
- Speed: 17 kn (31 km/h; 20 mph) surfaced; 8 kn (15 km/h; 9.2 mph) submerged
- Range: 3,500 nmi (6,500 km; 4,000 mi) at 8 kn (15 km/h; 9.2 mph) on the surface; 25 nmi (46 km; 29 mi) at 8 kn (15 km/h; 9.2 mph) submerged
- Complement: 31
- Armament: 2 × 21 inch bow torpedo tubes; 2 × 17.7 inch bow torpedo tubes; 2 × 17.7 inch stern torpedo tubes; 1 x 88 mm Bofors gun; 1 x 12.7 mm machine gun

The K XI class was a class of three submarines, built by Fijenoord shipyard in Rotterdam for the Royal Netherlands Navy. Used for patrols in the Dutch colonial waters. The submarines diving depth was 60 metres (200 ft). All ships were still in service at the start of World War II. K XIII was scuttled while under repair at Soerabaja to prevent her being captured by the invading Japanese forces.

== Construction ==
Name	Laid down	Launched	Commissioned	Decommissioned
K XI	9 December 1922	24 April 1924	24 March 1925	11 April 1945
K XII	9 January 1923	15 July 1924	19 May 1925	5 May 1944
K XIII	15 October 1923	23 December 1924	29 March 1926	2 March 1942 (scuttled)

== Bibliography ==
- Lenton, H.T. (1968). Royal Netherlands Navy. Navies of the Second World War. Macdonald & Co.
- Mark, Chris (1997). Schepen van de Koninklijke Marine in W.O. II (in Dutch). De Alk. ISBN 90-6013-522-9.
- Roberts, John (1980). "The Netherlands". In Chesneau, Roger (ed.). Conway's All the World's Fighting Ships 1922–1946. Greenwich, UK: Conway Maritime Press. pp. 385–396. ISBN 0-85177-146-7.
- van Willigenburg, Henk (2010). Dutch Warships of World War II. Lanasta. ISBN 978-90-8616-318-2.
