= HNLMS K XVI =

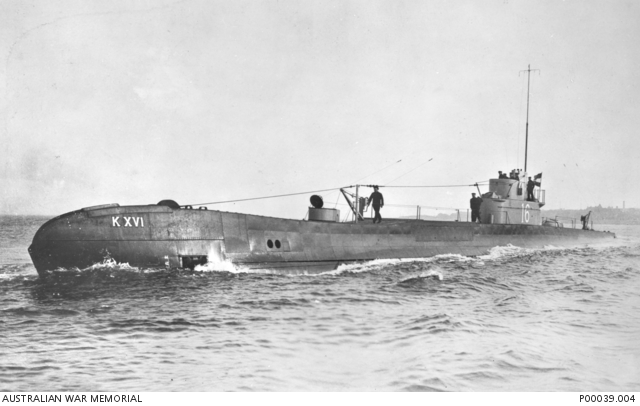
- HNLMS K XVI in the Dutch East Indies, circa 1939, shortly before the outbreak of World War II.

History

Netherlands
- Name: HNLMS K XVI
- Ordered: 30 May 1929
- Awarded: 31 May 1930
- Builder: Rotterdamsche Droogdok Maatschappij
- Yard number: RDM-169
- Laid down: 8 April 1933
- Commissioned: 31 January 1934
- Fate: Sunk on 25 December 1941

General characteristics
- Class & type: K XIV-class submarine
- Displacement: 865 tons surfaced; 1045 tons submerged
- Length: 73.64 m (241 ft 7 in)
- Beam: 6.51 m (21 ft 4 in)
- Draught: 3.93 m (12 ft 11 in)
- Propulsion: 2 × 1,600 bhp (1,193 kW) diesel engines; 2 × 430 bhp (321 kW) electric motors
- Speed: 17 kn (31 km/h; 20 mph) surfaced; 9 kn (17 km/h; 10 mph) submerged
- Range: 10,000 nmi (19,000 km; 12,000 mi) at 12 kn (22 km/h; 14 mph) on the surface; 26 nmi (48 km; 30 mi) at 8.5 kn (15.7 km/h; 9.8 mph) submerged
- Complement: 38
- Armament: 4 × 21 inch bow torpedo tubes; 2 × 21 inch stern torpedo tubes; 2 × 21 inch external-traversing torpedo tubes forward of the conning tower; 1 x 88 mm gun; 2 x 40 mm guns

HNLMS K XVI was one of five K XIV-class submarines built for the Royal Netherlands Navy (RNN). Entering service in 1934, the submarine was deployed to the Netherlands East Indies. On 24 December 1941, K XVI torpedoed and sank the Sagiri; the first Allied submarine to sink a Japanese warship. A day later, the Dutch submarine was torpedoed by the Japanese submarine I-66 (later renumbered to be I-166) off Borneo, with all aboard killed. The wreck of K XVI was rediscovered in October 2011 by a group of recreational divers and has since been illegally salvaged.

== Construction ==
K XVI was ordered from Rotterdam-based shipbuilder Rotterdamsche Droogdok Maatschappij on 30 May 1929, and was laid down on 31 May 1930. The submarine was launched on 8 April 1933, and commissioned into the RNN on 31 January 1934.

== Operational history ==
In January 1935, the boat was deployed to the Netherlands East Indies. She remained in this area after the start of World War II.

On 24 December 1941, approximately 35 nautical miles (65 km; 40 mi) off Kuching at 02°30′N 109°50′E, the submarine torpedoed and sank the Sagiri. The destroyer's aft magazine caught fire and exploded, sinking the ship with 121 of the 241 personnel aboard killed. Later that evening, the submarine attempted to attack the destroyer Murakumo, but was fended off by depth charges.

K XVI was torpedoed by the I-66 a day later, and sank with all 36 aboard. The boat was one of seven Dutch submarines lost during World War II.

On 25 October 2011, the Dutch Ministry of Defence announced that the wreck of K XVI had been found by Australian and Singaporean recreational divers off the northern coast of Borneo. In July 2024 it was reported that the wreck of K XVI had been illegally salvaged.
