= Japanese destroyer Sagiri =

Fubuki-class destroyer

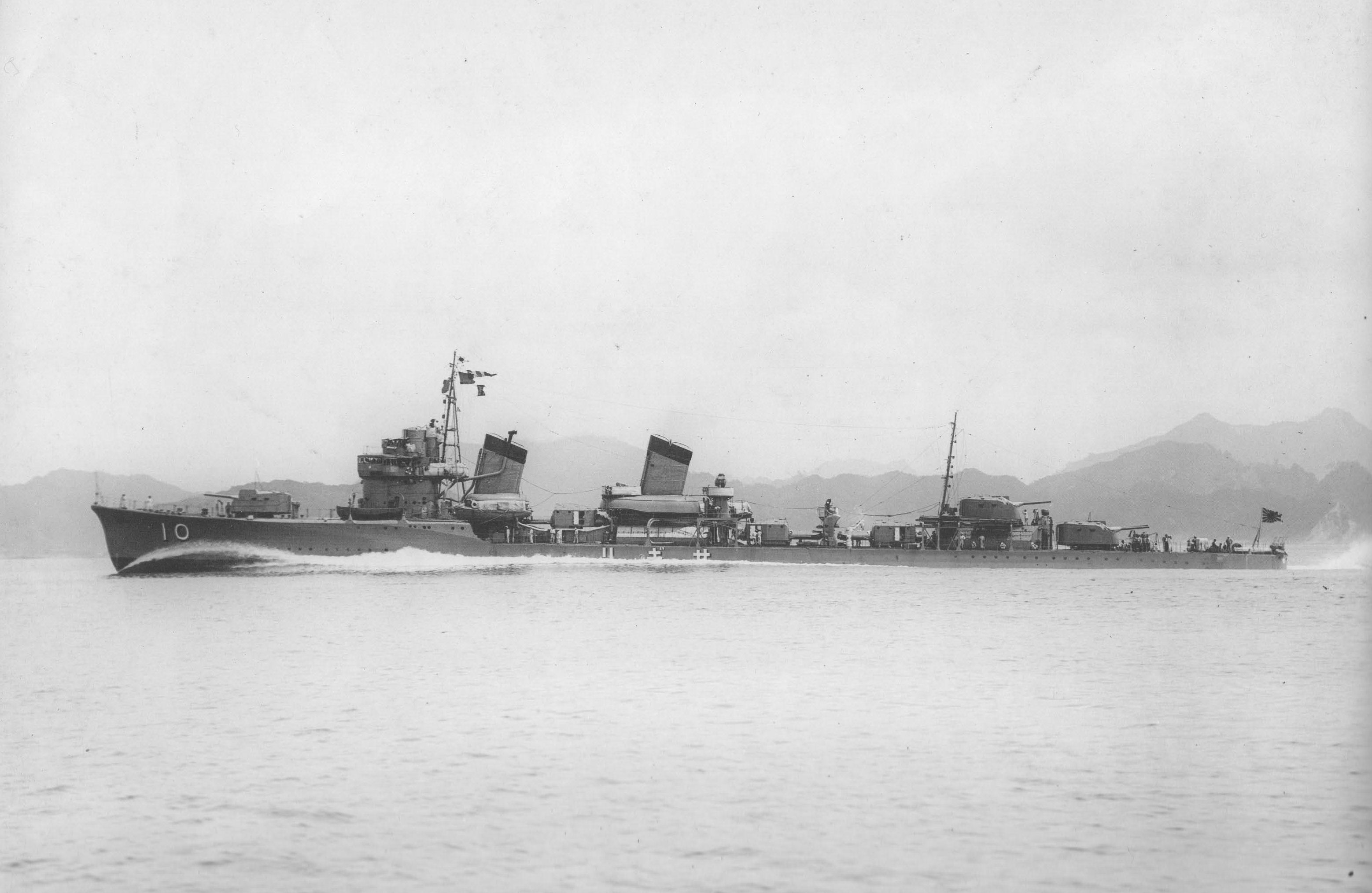
- Sagiri under way on 10 August 1936.

History

Empire of Japan
- Name: Sagiri
- Ordered: 1923 Fiscal Year
- Builder: Uraga Dock Company
- Yard number: Destroyer No. 50
- Laid down: 28 March 1929
- Launched: 23 December 1929
- Commissioned: 31 January 1931
- Stricken: 15 January 1942
- Fate: Sunk on 24 December 1941

General characteristics
- Class & type: Fubuki-class destroyer
- Displacement: 1,750 long tons (1,780 t) standard; 2,050 long tons (2,080 t) re-built
- Length: 111.96 m (367.3 ft) pp; 115.3 m (378 ft) waterline; 118.41 m (388.5 ft) overall
- Beam: 10.4 m (34 ft 1 in)
- Draft: 3.2 m (10 ft 6 in)
- Propulsion: 4 × Kampon type boilers; 2 × Kampon Type Ro geared turbines; 2 × shafts at 50,000 ihp (37,000 kW)
- Speed: 38 knots (44 mph; 70 km/h)
- Range: 5,000 nmi (9,300 km) at 14 knots (26 km/h)
- Complement: 219
- Armament: 6 × Type 3 127 mm 50 caliber naval guns (3×2); up to 22 × Type 96 25 mm AT/AA Guns; up to 10 × 13 mm AA guns; 9 × 610 mm (24 in) torpedo tubes; 36 × depth charges

Service record
- Operations: Second Sino-Japanese War; Battle of Malaya

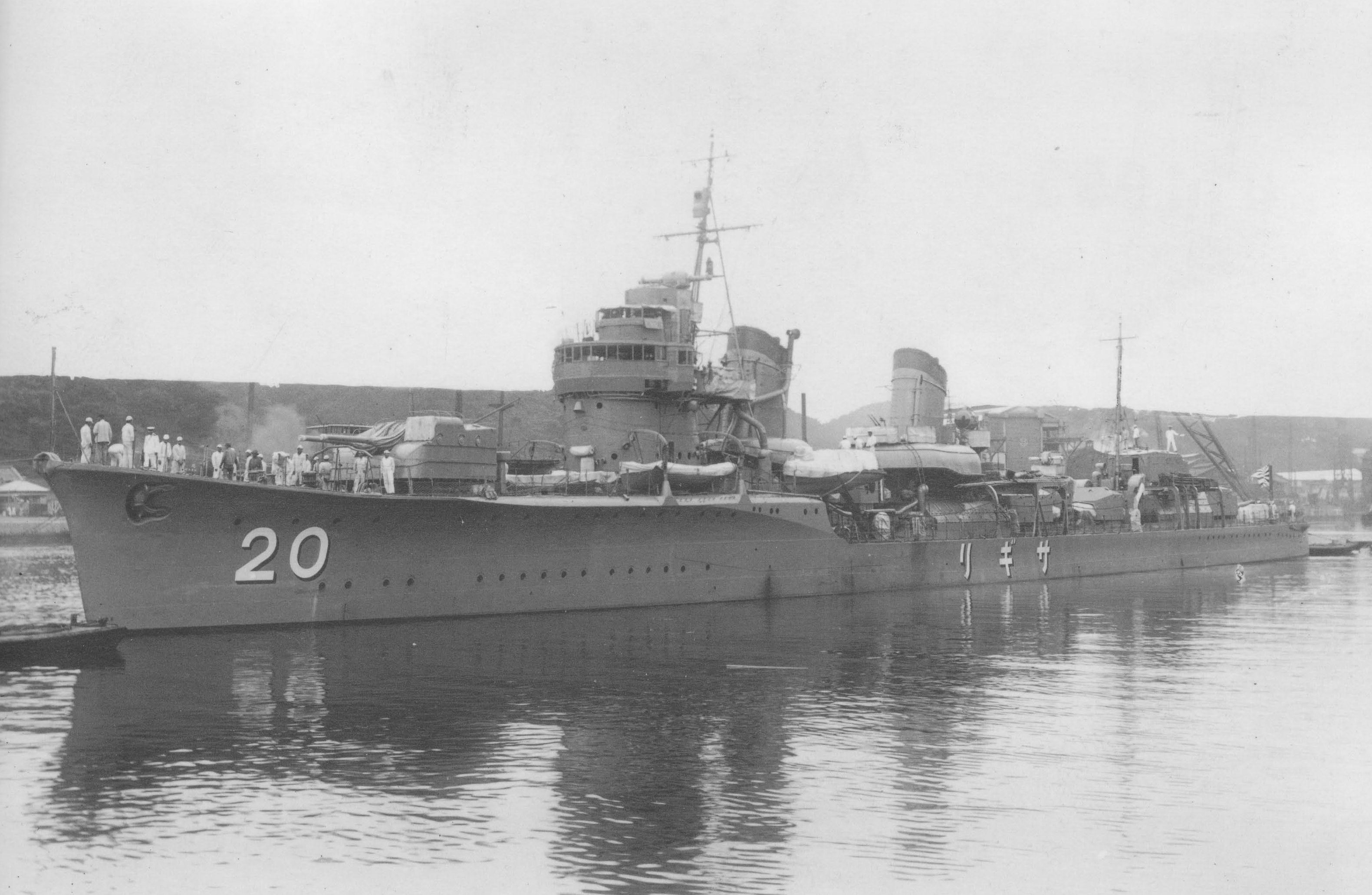
Sagiri in 1940

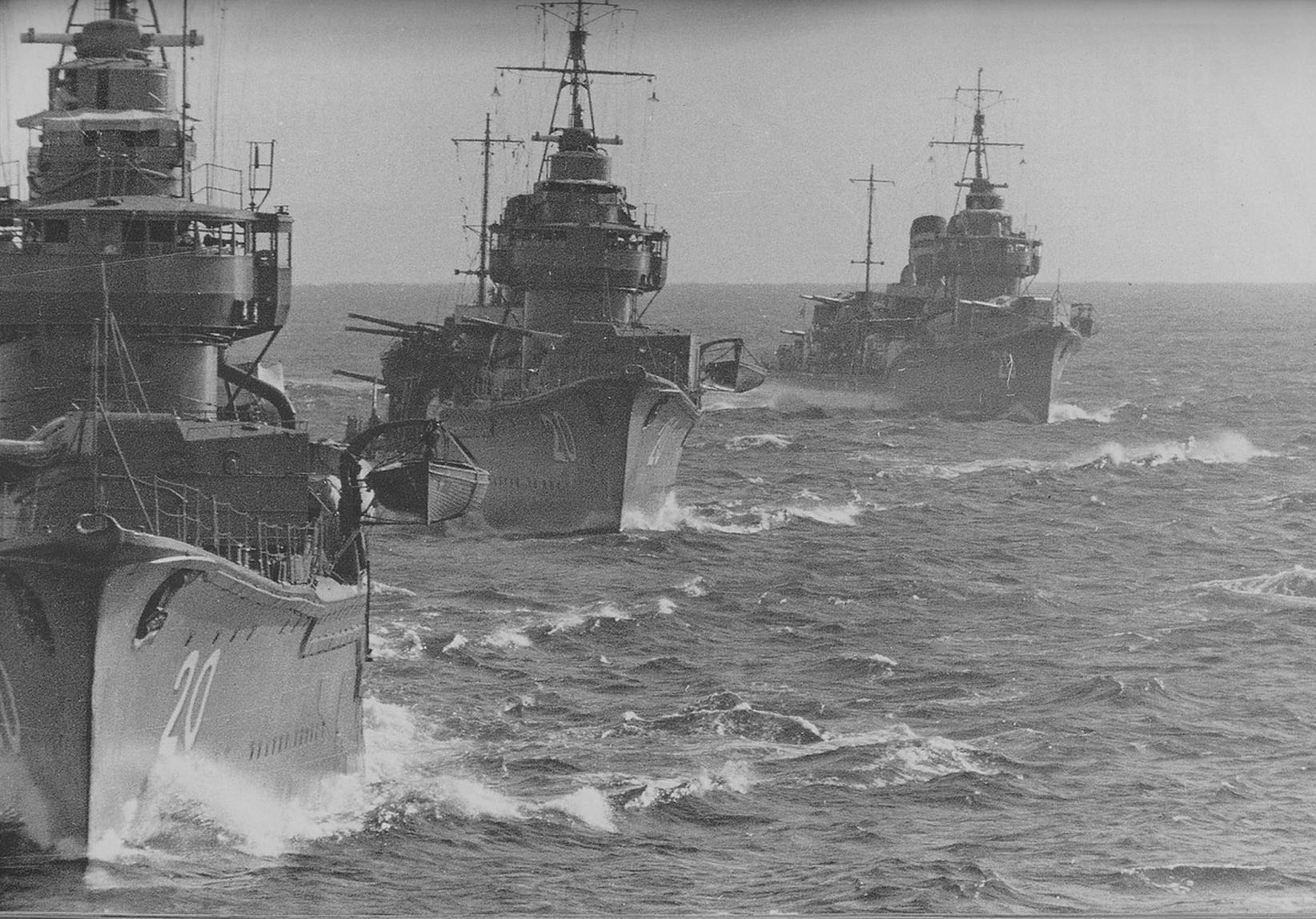
Destroyers Sagiri, Amagiri and Asagiri of the Type II of the Fubuki-class in exercises. The picture was taken from Yugiri on 16 October 1941.

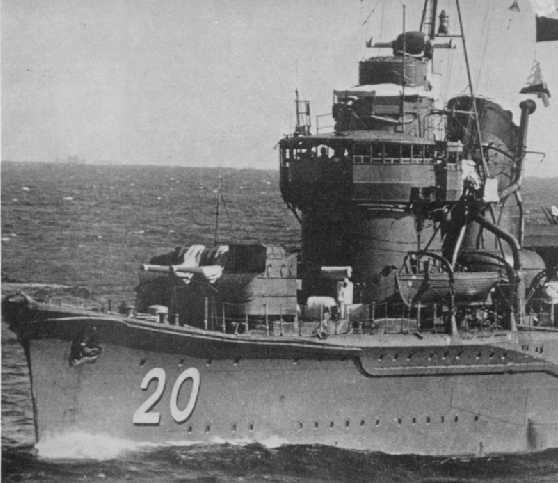
Front view of Sagiri

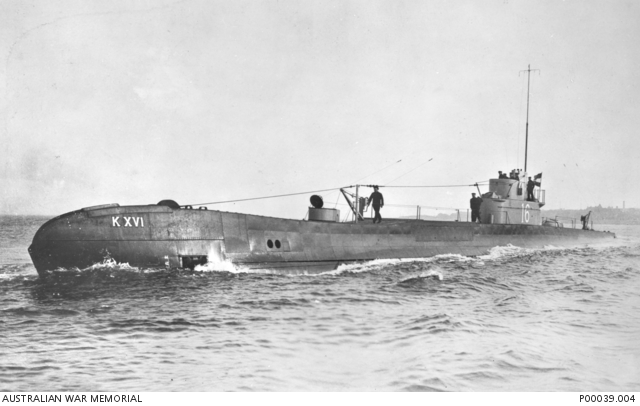
HNLMS K XVI, the Dutch submarine which sank Sagiri

Sagiri (狭霧, "Thin Haze") was the sixteenth of twenty-four Fubuki-class destroyers, built for the Imperial Japanese Navy following World War I.

== History ==
Construction of the advanced Fubuki-class destroyers was authorized as part of the Imperial Japanese Navy's expansion program from fiscal 1923, intended to give Japan a qualitative edge with the world's most modern ships. The Fubuki class had performance that was a huge leap over previous destroyer designs, so much so that they were designated Special Type destroyers (特型, Tokugata). The large size, powerful engines, high speed, large radius of action and unprecedented armament gave these destroyers the firepower similar to many light cruisers in other navies. Sagiri, built at the Uraga Dock Company was the sixth in an improved series, which incorporated a modified gun turret which could elevate her main battery of Type 3 127 mm 50 caliber naval guns to 75° as opposed to the original 40°, thus permitting the guns to be used as dual purpose guns against aircraft. Sagiri was laid down on 28 March 1929, launched on 23 December 1929 and commissioned on 31 January 1930. Originally assigned hull designation "Destroyer No. 50", she was commissioned as Sagiri.

The 4th Fleet Incident occurred only a year after her commissioning, and Sagiri was quickly taken back to the shipyards for strengthening of her hull.

== Operational history ==
On completion, Sagiri was assigned to Destroyer Division 20 under the IJN 2nd Fleet. During the Second Sino-Japanese War, from 1937, Sagiri covered landing of Japanese forces in Shanghai and Hangzhou. From 1940, she was assigned to patrol and cover landings of Japanese forces in south China.

=== World War II history ===
At the time of the attack on Pearl Harbor, Sagiri was assigned to Destroyer Division 20 of Desron 3 of the IJN 1st Fleet, and had deployed from Kure Naval District to the port of Samah on Hainan Island.

From 17 December, Sagiri covered Japanese landings at Miri and at Kuching in Sarawak. On 24 December 1941, approximately 35 nautical miles (65 km) off Kuching, Sagiri was torpedoed by the Dutch submarine HNLMS K XVI. Her aft magazine caught fire and exploded, sinking the ship with the loss of 121 of her crew. Some 120 survivors were rescued by her sister ship, Shirakumo.

On 15 January 1942, Sagiri was removed from the navy list.

=== Later history ===
It was discovered that ships from other countries were illegally taking many pieces of metal from this ship.
