= Japanese destroyer Shinonome (1927) =

Fubuki-class destroyer

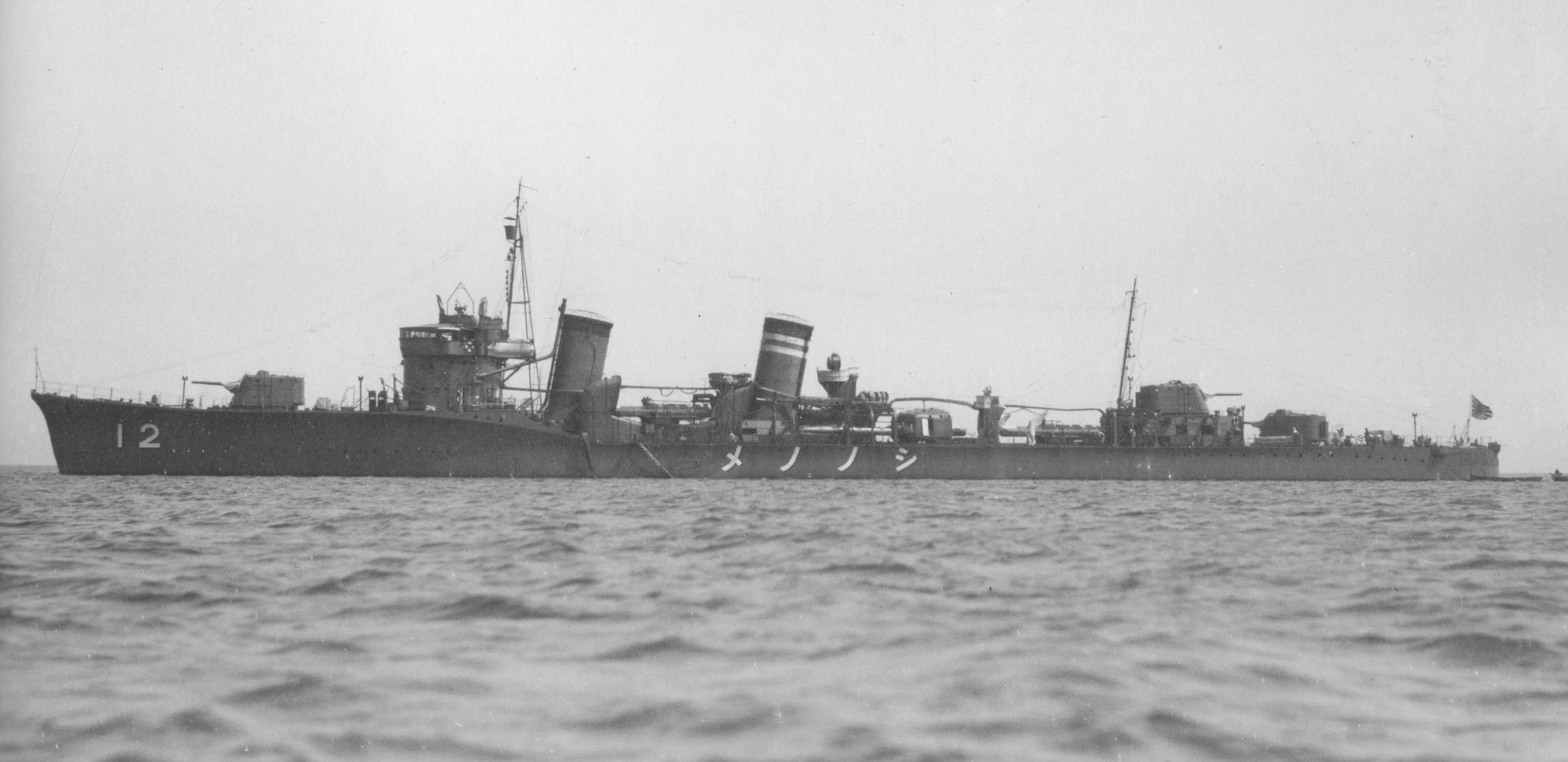
- Shinonome in 1930.

History

Empire of Japan
- Name: Shinonome
- Namesake: Daybreak
- Ordered: 1923 Fiscal Year
- Builder: Sasebo Naval Arsenal
- Yard number: Destroyer No.40
- Laid down: 12 August 1926
- Launched: 26 November 1927
- Commissioned: 25 July 1928
- Stricken: 15 January 1942
- Fate: Sunk on 17 December 1941, bombed by Dutch Aircraft

General characteristics
- Class & type: Fubuki-class destroyer
- Displacement: 1,750 long tons (1,780 t) standard; 2,050 long tons (2,080 t) re-built
- Length: 111.96 m (367.3 ft) pp; 115.3 m (378 ft) waterline; 118.41 m (388.5 ft) overall
- Beam: 10.4 m (34 ft 1 in)
- Draft: 3.2 m (10 ft 6 in)
- Propulsion: 4 × Kampon type boilers; 2 × Kampon Type Ro geared turbines; 2 × shafts at 50,000 ihp (37,000 kW)
- Speed: 38 knots (44 mph; 70 km/h)
- Range: 5,000 nmi (9,300 km) at 14 knots (26 km/h)
- Complement: 219
- Armament: 6 × Type 3 127 mm 50 caliber naval guns (3×2); up to 22 × Type 96 25 mm AT/AA Guns; up to 10 × 13 mm AA guns; 9 × 610 mm (24 in) torpedo tubes; 36 × depth charges

Service record
- Operations: Second Sino-Japanese War; Invasion of French Indochina; Battle of Malaya

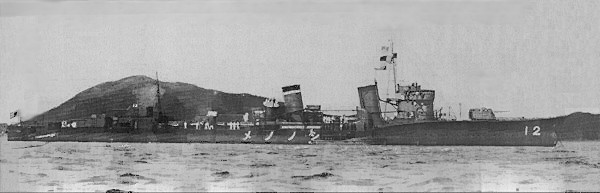
Another view of Shinonome.

Shinonome (東雲, ”Daybreak”) was the sixth of twenty-four Fubuki-class destroyers, built for the Imperial Japanese Navy following World War I.

== History ==
Construction of the advanced Fubuki-class destroyers was authorized as part of the Imperial Japanese Navy's expansion program from fiscal year 1923, intended to give Japan a qualitative edge with the world's most modern ships. The Fubuki class had performance that was a quantum leap over previous destroyer designs, so much so that they were designated Special Type destroyers (特型, Tokugata). The large size, powerful engines, high speed, large radius of action and unprecedented armament gave these destroyers the firepower similar to many light cruisers in other navies. Shinonome, built at the Sasebo Naval Arsenal was laid down on 12 August 1926, launched on 26 November 1927 and commissioned on 25 July 1928. Originally assigned hull designation “Destroyer No. 40”, she was completed as Shinonome.

== Operational history ==
On completion, Shinonome was assigned to Destroyer Division 12 under the IJN 2nd Fleet. During the Second Sino-Japanese War, Shinonome was assigned to patrols of the southern China coast, and participated in the Invasion of French Indochina in 1940.

=== World War II history ===
At the time of the attack on Pearl Harbor, Shinonome was assigned to Destroyer Division 12 of Destroyer Squadron 3 of the IJN 1st Fleet, and had deployed from Kure Naval District to the port of Samah on Hainan Island. From 4 December to 12 December, she covered Japanese landings at Kota Bharu in Malaya.

From 16 December, Shinonome was assigned to cover Japanese landings during "Operation B", the invasion of British Borneo. The Shinonome was sunk on 17 December 1941, after being struck by two bombs from a Dornier Do 24 flying boat X-32 of the Royal Dutch Naval Air Group GVT-7, which detonated her aft magazine. The Shinonome exploded and sank with all hands in the vicinity of Miri, Sarawak (04°24′N 114°0′E)

On 15 January 1942, Shinonome was struck from the navy list.

=== Shinonome wreckage ===
The exact position of the wreck of Shinonome remains unknown, but it likely lies somewhere between Seria, Brunei to the north, and Miri town itself. Wreck researchers, including a team based in Miri and with help from the Netherlands, have been searching for the ship's remains since 2004, but a 2023 expedition failed to find them. The position, orientation and condition of the wreck will help to resolve the lingering uncertainty about the circumstances surrounding Shinonome's sinking.
