= Battle of Borneo (1941–1942) =

WWII Japanese campaign

- Part of the Pacific Theatre of World War II
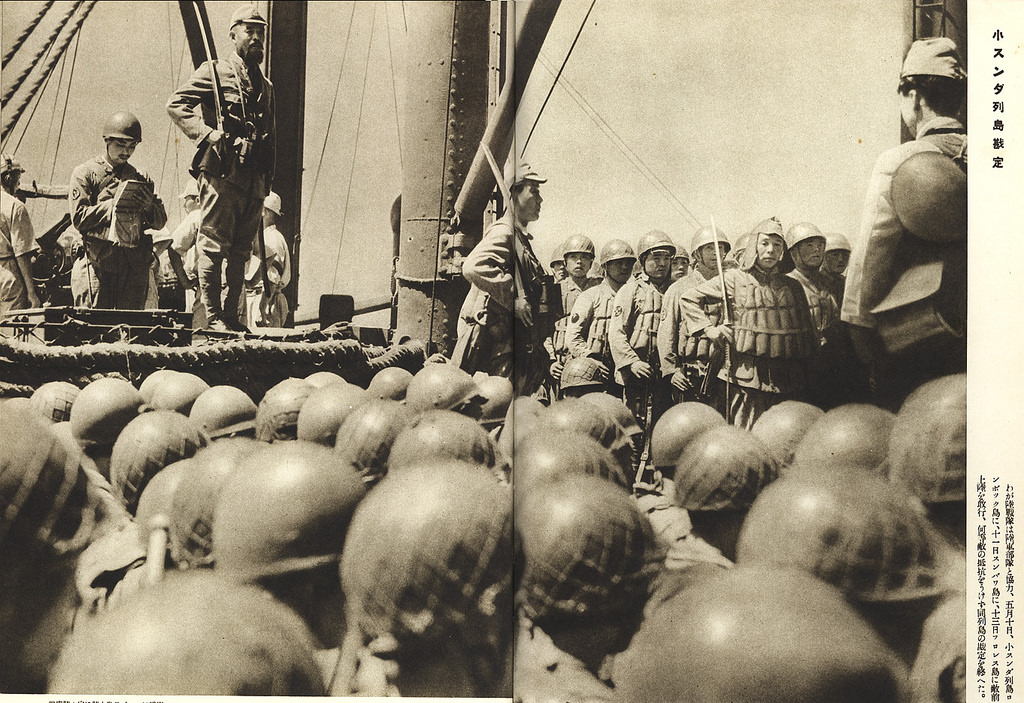
- Japanese paratroopers of the 2nd Yokosuka Naval Landing Force under the command of Lieutenant Colonel Genzo Watanabe (standing on top in the left) inside a transport ship heading to Borneo prior to their invasion in December 1941.
Date	16 December 1941 – March 1942
Location	Borneo Island
Result	Japanese victory
Territorial changes	Japanese occupation of British Borneo and Dutch Borneo

Belligerents
(Empire of Japan) Japan	United Kingdom; (Raj of Sarawak) Sarawak; India; North Borneo; Brunei; Labuan; Netherlands; Dutch East Indies

Commanders and leaders
Kiyotake Kawaguchi	Robert Brooke-Popham (United Kingdom) C.M. Lane (Netherlands) Dominicus Mars

Strength
4,500 infantry 2 heavy cruisers 1 light cruiser 6 destroyers 1 submarine chaser 1 seaplane tender 1 minesweeper 1 submarine 1 collier 10 transports	1,000 Sarawak Force; 1,000 British Punjab Regiment; 1,000 KNIL; 650 police 5 fighters Unknown bomber strength 3 flying boats 2 submarines

Casualties and losses
567+ casualties 2 destroyers sunk 1 minesweeper sunk 1 collier sunk 2 transports sunk 1 transport beached 1 transport damaged	2,300 casualties 1 flying boat destroyed 1 submarine sunk

The Battle of Borneo was the successful campaign by the Empire of Japan for control of British Borneo and Dutch Borneo.

== Background ==
Balikpapan in Dutch Borneo, was a key Japanese target since oil from Samarinda and Sanga Sanga was refined, stored, and shipped there, besides having an airfield from which attacks could be launched against Java.

British Borneo was important since it contained the Miri and Seria oil fields, the Lutong refinery, and the Ledo airfield outside Kuching.

According to Percival, only token British forces were stationed in British Borneo, due to the lack of railways and roads, with transportation limited to coastal steamers. The objective of these forces was to destroy the oil fields and delay capture of the Kuching airfield. The plans were drawn up in August 1941, so that surplus equipment was shipped out, the Miri field closed down, the wells at Seria cemented in, and one of the Lutong refineries shut down. On 8 December, final demolition commenced, and Miri troops were evacuated to Kuching on 13 Dec.

== Invasion ==
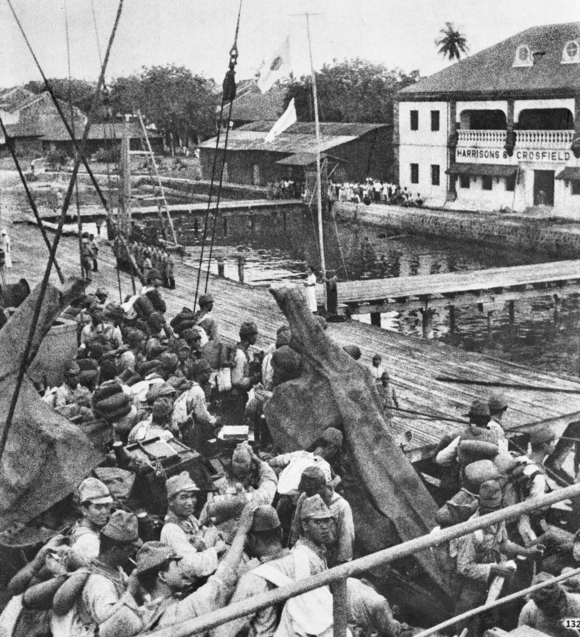
Additional Japanese troops landing off the west coast of British North Borneo in Labuan, 14 January 1942.

On 13 December, the Kiyotake Kawaguchi's Kawaguchi Detachment left Cam Ranh Bay for Borneo with the objective of capturing Miri and then Kuching. Included in this detachment was an oil drilling group of about 150 oil engineers for the restoration of the Miri and Seria oil fields. On 16 December, they landed near Miri. On 25 December, the Kuching airfield was captured, after British troops under Lane retreated into Dutch West Borneo. On 7 January, the 2/15 Punjab Regiment defended the approach to Sanggau airfield, before being forced to retreat. Then on 28 January, Ledo airfield was captured, when the Kuching airfield was determined to be unusable for their navy land-based planes.

Dutch Martin B-10 bombers attacked Japanese shipping from their base, 'Singkawang II' at Miri, on 17 December, but their attempt failed. The three Dornier Do 24Ks followed up with their own attack, but one was shot down, possibly by a floatplane from Kamikawa Maru. The remaining two, benefiting from cloud cover, were never seen by the Japanese. One flying boat scored two 200 kg bomb hits on Shinonome, causing a massive explosion, while a near miss ruptured its hull plating. The destroyer's stern broke off and the ship sank within minutes.

On 22 December, a Japanese convoy left Miri for Kuching, but was spotted by the Dutch flying boat X-35, which radioed a warning to the Dutch submarine HNLMS K XIV, under the command of Lieutenant Commander Carel A. J. van Groeneveld. At 20:40 on 23 December, K XIV infiltrated the convoy and began its attack. The army transports Hiyoshi Maru and Katori Maru were sunk with the loss of hundreds of troops. Hokkai Maru was beached to prevent her from sinking, and another transport was less seriously damaged.

On the night of 23–24 December, HNLMS K XVI torpedoed the Japanese destroyer Sagiri 30 miles (48 km) north of Kuching, becoming the first Allied submarine in the Pacific to sink a warship. K XVI was lost with all hands during the day by a torpedo from Japanese submarine I66.

On 24 and 28 December, B-10 bombers from a different unit flew missions against Kuching from Singapore, Sembawang. On 26 December, B-10s operating out of Samarinda sank a Japanese minesweeper and a collier.

By 1 February, all of British Borneo was under Japanese control.

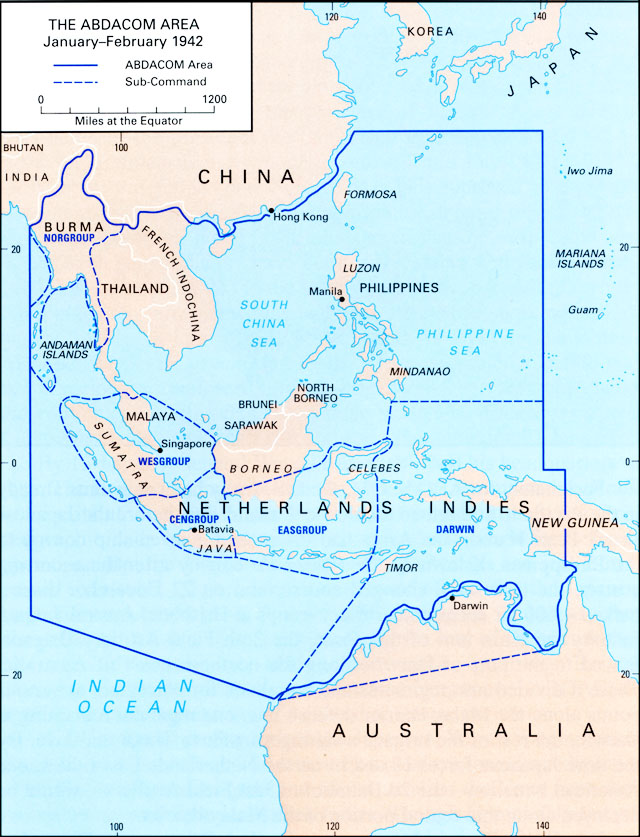
Map of the American-British-Dutch-Australian Command (ABDACOM) area, with Borneo just left of centre.
