= HNLMS K XV =

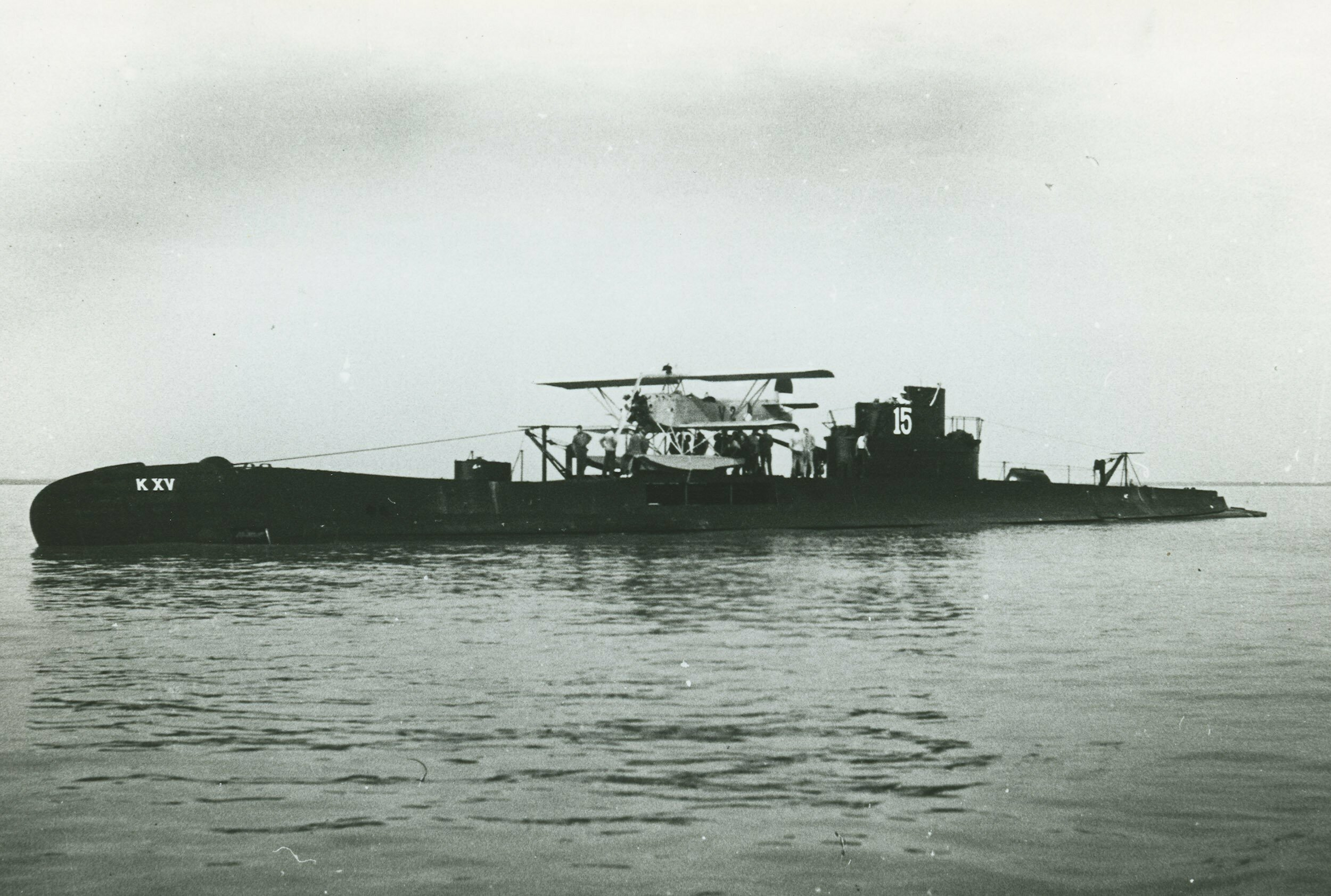
- K XV in the Dutch East Indies, 1935

History

Netherlands
- Name: K XV
- Builder: Rotterdamsche Droogdok Maatschappij
- Yard number: RDM-168
- Laid down: 31 May 1930
- Launched: 10 December 1932
- Commissioned: 30 December 1933
- Decommissioned: 23 April 1946
- Fate: Sold for scrap, December 1950

General characteristics
- Class & type: K XIV-class submarine
- Displacement: 771 long tons (783 t) (surfaced); 1,008 long tons (1,024 t) (submerged)
- Length: 242 ft 6 in (73.9 m)
- Beam: 25 ft (7.6 m)
- Draft: 12 ft 9 in (3.9 m)}
- Propulsion: 2 × 1,600 bhp (1,193 kW) diesel engines; 2 × 430 bhp (321 kW) electric motors
- Speed: 17 knots (31 km/h; 20 mph) (surfaced); 9 kn (17 km/h; 10 mph) (submerged)
- Range: 10,000 nmi (19,000 km; 12,000 mi) at 12 knots (22 km/h; 14 mph) (surfaced); 26 nmi (48 km; 30 mi) at 8 kn (15 km/h; 9.2 mph) (submerged)
- Test depth: 260 ft (79 m)
- Complement: 38
- Armament: 4 × 21 in (533 mm) bow torpedo tubes; 2 × 21 in (533 mm) stern torpedo tubes; 2 × 21 in (533 mm) external traversing torpedo tubes; 1 x single 88 mm (3.5 in) deck gun; 2 x single 40 mm (1.6 in) AA guns

K XV was one of five K XIV-class patrol submarines built for the Royal Netherlands Navy during the 1930s for colonial service. Completed in 1933, the boat spent the bulk of her career in the Dutch East Indies. During the Pacific War, K XV made 13 war patrols, many of which were intelligence operations. The boat was taken out of service in 1946.

== Design and description ==
The K XIV-class submarines were designed to patrol the waters of the Dutch East Indies. They had a length of 242 feet 6 inches (73.9 m) overall, a beam of 25 feet (7.6 m) and a draft of 12 feet 9 inches (3.9 m). They displaced 771 long tons (783 t) on the surface and 1,008 long tons (1,024 t) submerged. The submarines had a crew of 38.

For surface running, the boats were powered by two 1,600-brake-horsepower (1,193 kW) MAN diesel engines, each driving one propeller shaft. When submerged each propeller was driven by a 430-horsepower (321 kW) electric motor. They could reach 17 knots (31 km/h; 20 mph) on the surface and 9 knots (17 km/h; 10 mph) underwater. On the surface, the boats had a range of 10,000 nautical miles (19,000 km; 12,000 mi) at 12 knots (22 km/h; 14 mph) and 26 nmi (48 km; 30 mi) at 8 knots (15 km/h; 9.2 mph) submerged. The submarines had a diving depth of 260 feet (79 m).

The K XIV class was armed with eight 21-inch (530 mm) torpedo tubes, four in the bow, two in the stern, and a pair on a rotating mount amidships. The boats carried a 14 torpedoes. They were also armed with a 88-millimeter (3.5 in) deck gun and two single 40-millimeter (1.6 in) Bofors AA guns.

== Construction and career ==
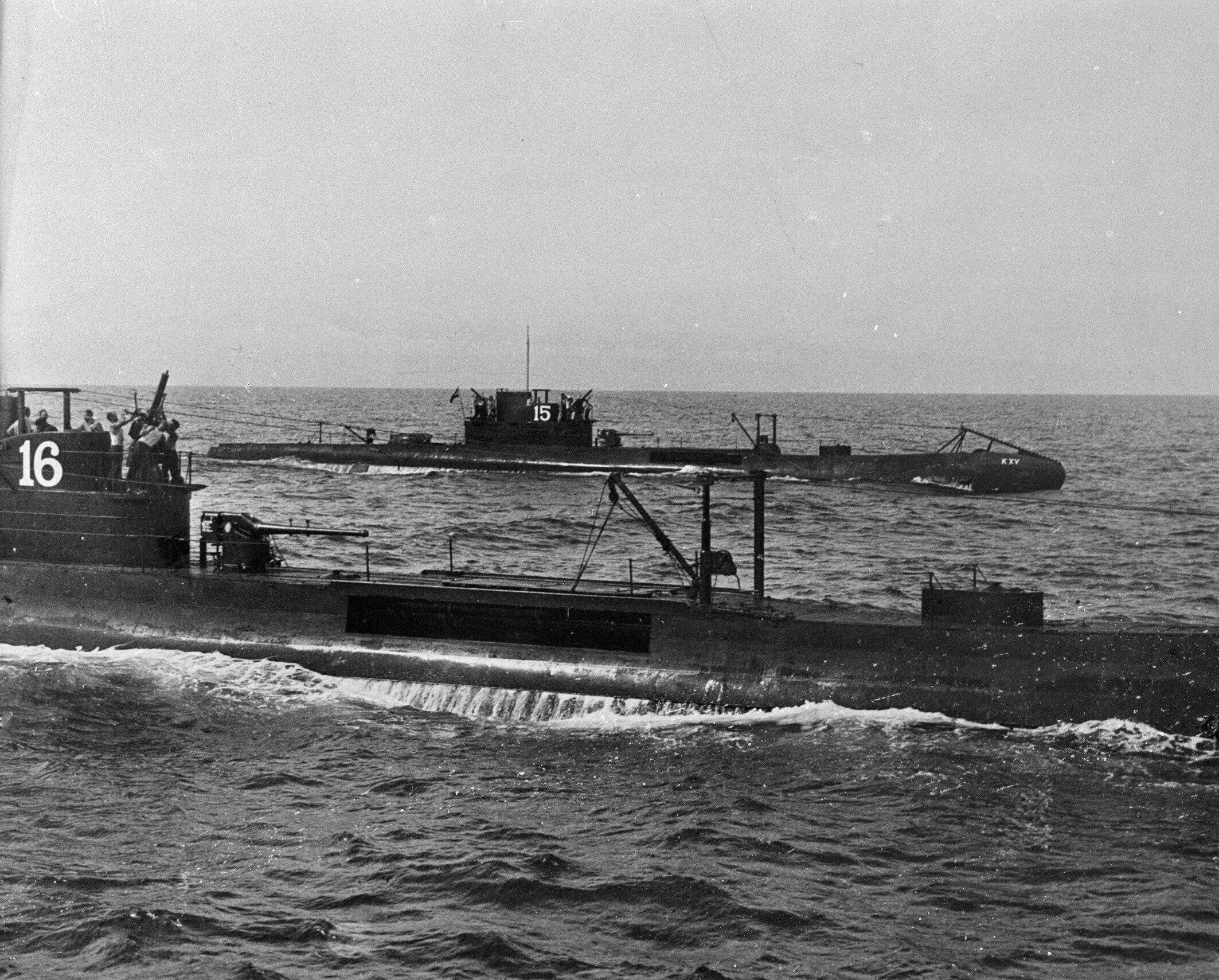
Sister ships K XVI and K XV photographed together at sea

K XV was ordered on 30 May 1929 and laid down on 31 May 1930 at the shipyard of Rotterdamsche Droogdok Maatschappij in Rotterdam. The boat was launched on 10 December 1932 and commissioned on 30 December 1933.

During the Pacific War, K XV damaged a Japanese oil tanker in 1942 and sank a small patrol ship in 1944. Most of her war patrols were in the service of Allied intelligence agencies. She survived the war, and was decommissioned on 23 April 1946.

== Bibliography ==
- Bagnasco, Erminio (2018) [1977]. Submarines of World War Two: Design, Development and Operations. Naval Institute Press. ISBN 978-1-68247-384-9.
- Lenton, H. T. (1968). Royal Netherlands Navy. Navies of the Second World War. Macdonald & Co.
- Mark, Chris (1997). Schepen van de Koninklijke Marine in W.O. II (in Dutch). Alkmaar: De Alk. ISBN 90-6013-522-9.
- Noppen, Ryan K. (2020). The Royal Netherlands Navy of World War II. New Vanguard. Vol. 285. Osprey Publishing. ISBN 978-1-4728-4191-9.
- Roberts, John (1980). "The Netherlands". In Chesneau, Roger (ed.). Conway's All the World's Fighting Ships 1922–1946. Conway Maritime Press. pp. 385–396. ISBN 0-85177-146-7.
- van Willigenburg, Henk (2010). Dutch Warships of World War II. Lanasta. ISBN 978-90-8616-318-2.
