= Sebuku, Borneo =

Island in South Kalimantan Province, Indonesia

Sebuku
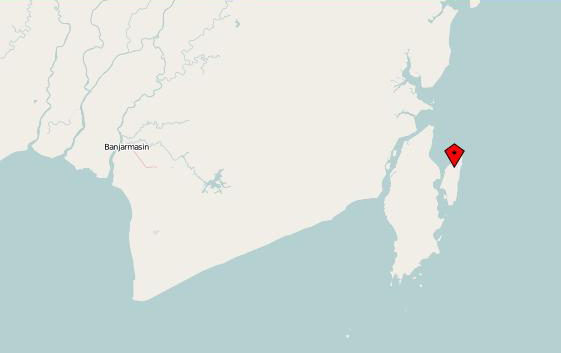
- Sebuku's location south-east of Borneo

- Location within Indonesia

Geography
- Location: South East Asia
- Coordinates: 3.45°S 116.39°E
- Area: 275 km^{2} (106 sq mi)

Administration
- Indonesia

Demographics
- Population: 4,900 (2008)
- Pop. density: 17.8/km^{2} (46.1/sq mi)

Sebuku (old spelling Seboekoe) is a 275-square-kilometre (106 mi^{2}) island south-east of Borneo and administratively part of South Kalimantan, Indonesia. Sebuku is home to a large coal mine operated by Straits Asia Resources, which produces 3 million tonnes of coal every year.

== Overview ==
Sebuku is located to the south-east of Borneo, approximately 5 kilometres (3.1 mi) from Laut Island. It is roughly 35 kilometres (22 mi) from north to south and 10 kilometres (6.2 mi) from east to west at its widest point, covering a total area of 275 square kilometres (106 mi^{2}). Administratively, it is part of South Kalimantan, Indonesia. It is on the Kanibungan Fault.

Coal was first found on the island by the Dutch colonial government in 1925. Large deposits of coal, dating from the Eocene, have been found in Sebuku's south-west region; the main deposit forms a syncline which trends from north to south. The strata around the coal is mainly mudstone and shale.

Sebuku is home to roughly 4,900 people, with a total population density of 17.8 inhabitants per square kilometre (46/sq mi). Prior to the opening of the coal mine, it had no infrastructure; now there are small roads, a port, and a small airfield.

== Mining ==
Although the Dutch originally discovered at least 25 coal deposits on Sebuku, after realizing that the island may not survive mining they cancelled their plans. Instead, they kept the island as a preserved park to serve as a buffer for Laut Island.

Due to estimates of coal reserves measuring eleven million metric tonnes, infrastructure for a mine was built beginning in June 1997; mining began in December of the same year, despite concerns that the mining could sink the island. The mine is operated by Singapore-based Straits Asia Resources, a subsidiary of Straits Resources. Mining is done using multiple open pits.

As of 30 June 2008, the total remaining coal was estimated at 384 megatonnes, with a reserve base of 19 megatonnes. Production is estimated to be 3 megatonnes per annum.
