= HMS Taciturn =

Submarine of the Royal Navy

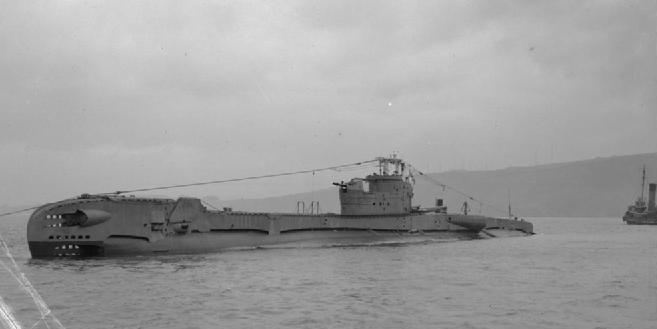
- HMS Taciturn

History

United Kingdom
- Name: HMS Taciturn
- Builder: Vickers Armstrongs, Barrow
- Laid down: 9 March 1943
- Launched: 7 June 1944
- Commissioned: 8 October 1944
- Identification: Pennant number P334
- Fate: Scrapped August 1971
- Badge

General characteristics
- Class & type: British T class submarine
- Displacement: 1,290 tons surfaced; 1,560 tons submerged
- Length: 276 ft 6 in (84.28 m)
- Beam: 25 ft 6 in (7.77 m)
- Draught: 12 ft 9 in (3.89 m) forward; 14 ft 7 in (4.45 m) aft
- Propulsion: Two shafts; Twin diesel engines 2,500 hp (1.86 MW) each; Twin electric motors 1,450 hp (1.08 MW) each
- Speed: 15.5 knots (28.7 km/h) surfaced; 9 knots (20 km/h) submerged
- Range: 4,500 nautical miles at 11 knots (8,330 km at 20 km/h) surfaced
- Test depth: 300 ft (91 m) max
- Complement: 61
- Armament: 6 internal forward-facing 21 inch (533 mm) torpedo tubes; 2 external forward-facing torpedo tubes; 2 external amidships rear-facing torpedo tubes; 1 external rear-facing torpedo tubes; 6 reload torpedoes; QF 4 inch (100 mm) deck gun; 3 anti aircraft machine guns

HMS Taciturn was a British submarine of the third group of the T class. built by Vickers Armstrongs, Barrow and launched on 7 June 1944. So far she has been the only ship of the Royal Navy to bear the name Taciturn.

== Service ==
Taciturn served in the Far East for much of her wartime career, where she sank a Japanese air warning picket hulk (this was the hulk of the salvaged former Dutch submarine K XVIII), the Japanese auxiliary submarine chaser Cha 105, and a Japanese sailing vessel. On 1 August 1945, Taciturn, in company with HMS Thorough, attacked Japanese shipping and shore targets off northern Bali. Taciturn sank two Japanese sailing vessels with gunfire.

She survived the war and continued in service with the Navy, becoming the first ship of the class to undergo the 'Super T' conversion.

On 9 January 1958, Taciturn ran aground in the Firth of Clyde. She later was refloated with the aid of the boom defence vessel HMS Barcombe.

Taciturn was sold to Thos. W. Ward and scrapped at Briton Ferry, Wales on 8 August 1971.

== Publications ==
- Colledge, J. J.; Warlow, Ben (2006) [1969]. Ships of the Royal Navy: The Complete Record of All Fighting Ships of the Royal Navy from the 15th Century to the Present (3rd Rev ed.). London: Chatham Publishing. ISBN 978-1-86176-281-8. OCLC 67375475.
- Hutchinson, Robert (2001). Jane's Submarines: War Beneath the Waves from 1776 to the Present Day. London: HarperCollins. ISBN 978-0-00-710558-8. OCLC 53783010.
