= Royal Netherlands Navy Submarine Service =

Submarine element of the Royal Netherlands Navy

- Onderzeedienst
- Emblem of the OZD
- Founded: 21 December 1906; 119 years ago
- Country: Netherlands
- Branch: Royal Netherlands Navy
- Part of: Ministry of Defence
- Engagements: World War II; West New Guinea dispute

The Royal Netherlands Navy Submarine Service (Dutch: Onderzeedienst; OZD) is a department within the Royal Netherlands Navy that is responsible for the deployment of Dutch submarines. It was established out of the Netherlands Torpedo Service on 21 December 1906, and merged with the Netherlands Mine Service on 15 July 2005.

== History ==
=== Early history ===
The Royal Netherlands Navy Submarine Service (OZD) was established on 21 December 1906. In this year the Royal Netherlands Navy commissioned its first submarine, HNLMS O 1. The OZD was tasked with taking care of the equipment of the submarines and the training of the crews.

At this time there were still doubts about the usefulness of submarines. Royal Netherlands Navy officers did indeed see an "interesting and ingeniously constructed mechanism" in the vessel, but were hesitant about their practicality. Trial sailing slowly but surely removed the doubts in the naval command. Only under the influence of the First World War did the officers get more interested in the new type of war material.

=== World War II ===
During World War I and the interwar period, the Royal Netherlands Navy ordered and built many submarines. As a result, at the start of World War II, the OZD had more than 20 submarines at its disposal. On 10 May 1940, the Royal Netherlands Navy had three operational submarines in the Netherlands, namely HNLMS O 9, O 10, and O 13. HNLMS O 11 was being repaired, while O 8 and O 12 were undergoing maintenance.

Meanwhile, HNLMS O 14 and O 15 were active at the time in the Caribbean. Furthermore, seven submarines were in various stages of completion at different yards. On the other hand, the Dutch navy had 15 operational submarines in the Dutch East Indies. These submarines played an important role during the war, by confronting and sinking enemy ships. For example, HNLMS O 16 and K XVII sunk several Japanese ships in 1941. However, there were also losses in this theater, both HNLMS O 16 and K XVII were sunk in December 1941.

=== Expansion ===
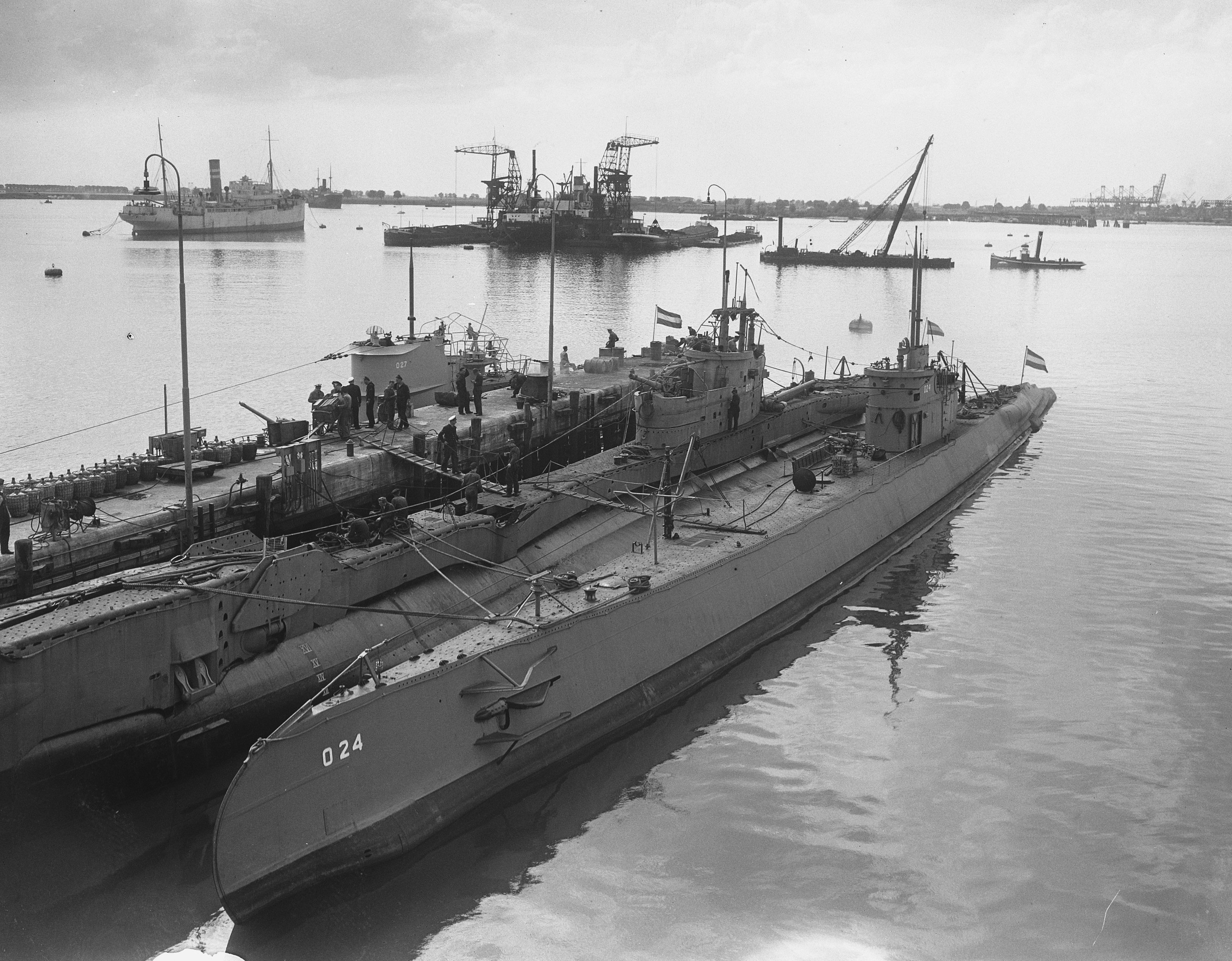
HNLMS O 24 moored alongside two other OZD submarines in 1949

After 1945, the OZD had eight submarines, but due to intensive use in the war these were in a bad condition. Also the fact that the fleet consisted of different classes was a problem. It made maintenance and exercise of crews very pricey. Due to the economic malaise and the high costs caused by operations in the Dutch East Indies, there was no money left for new construction. In the end the navy managed to take four submarines on loan from the British and the Americans. In 1946, the Netherlands still had a total of eight operational submarines in service: HNLMS O 21, O 23, O 24, O 27, Dolfijn, Zwaardvisch, Zeehond, and Tijgerhaai.

Since the home port at Den Helder was in ruins, these submarines were for the time being using the Waalhaven in Rotterdam as their base. During this time docking and maintenance of the submarines took place at the shipyard of RDM. For the OZD, this period just after World War II meant depending on Dutch pre-war submarines and second-hand British and American submarines. The commissioning of the Dolfijn-class submarines in the early 1960s was an important milestone. The four boats formed the backbone of the OZD during a large part of the Cold War; they were in service from 1960 to 1992.

=== Cold War ===
The Dutch submarine fleet never reached the size it had before the World War II again. The new global power relations also generated a new package of tasks. In cooperation with other NATO countries, these are mainly non-attack tasks. Since the Dutch submarines were ideally suited for unnoticed explorations, the OZD was mostly focused on gathering intelligence during the Cold War. This happened, for example, during the West New Guinea dispute in the early 1960s, when three Dutch submarines patroled the Indonesian ports, to warn against possible invasions of West New Guinea. Starting in the 1950s the Dutch submarine service also started participating in submarine warfare exercises that involved ships from other NATO navies.

On 14 July 1964 the submarine service received a standard from Queen Juliana.

In the period from 1970 to the 1990s, the crew of the six Dutch submarines secretly gathered information about the Soviet Union. Most of the other missions the OZD carried out remain secret to this day.

=== Post-Cold War ===
In the Defensienota 1991 it was disclosed that the number of submarines of the Royal Netherlands Navy would be reduced from 6 to 4.

Since 2020 women are allowed to serve on submarines of the OZD. In 2021 it was reported that in the near future the Royal Netherlands Navy will no longer use its submarines as practice target during anti-submarine warfare exercises. They will be replaced by drones.

In June 2026 it was announced that the future Orka class submarines will be equipped with the F21 torpedo instead of the Mark 48 torpedo.

== Vessels ==
Class	Photo	Type	Number	Introduced	Notes
Walrus		Submarine	3	1994	Multi-purpose diesel-electric powered hunter-killer submarines for deep ocean, brown water, and special force operations
Mercuur		Submarine tender	1	1987	Submarine support vessel and MCM command, upgraded in 2017

== See also ==
- Naval history of the Netherlands
