= List of submarines of the Netherlands =

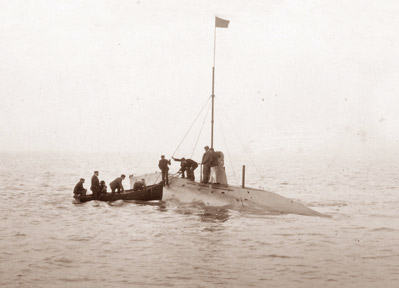
HNLMS O 1, the first submarine of the Dutch navy at sea

This is a list of submarines of the Netherlands navy.

== Submarines built before 1940 ==
Until the O 19 class there was distinction made between O submarines used for European home waters and K submarines used for colonial service.

=== Submarines built for service in Europe ===
- O1-class submarine
  - O 1
- O 2-class submarine
  - O 2
  - O 3
  - O 4
  - O 5
- O 6-class submarine
  - O 6
- O 7-class submarine
  - O 7
- German Type UC I submarine
  - M1
- British H-class submarine
  - O 8
- O 9-class submarine
  - O 9
  - O 10
  - O 11
- O 12-class submarine
  - O 12
  - O 13
  - O 14
  - O 15
- O 16-class submarine
  - O 16

=== Submarines built for colonial service ===
- K I-class submarine
  - K I
- K II-class submarine
  - K II
- K III-class submarine
  - K III
  - K IV
- K V-class submarine
  - K V
  - K VI
  - K VII
- K VIII-class submarine
  - K VIII
  - K IX
  - K X
- K XI-class submarine
  - K XI
  - K XII
  - K XIII
- K XIV-class submarine
  - K XIV
  - K XV
  - K XVI
  - K XVII
  - K XVIII

=== Submarines built for both colonial service and service in Europe ===
- O 19-class submarine
  - O 19
  - O 20
- O 21-class submarine
  - O 21
  - O 22
  - O 23
  - O 24
  - O 25
  - O 26
  - O 27

== Submarines built after 1940 ==
- British U-class submarine
  - Dolfijn
- British S-class submarine
  - Zeehond
- British T-class submarine (Zwaardvisch-class submarine)
  - Zwaardvisch
  - Tijgerhaai
  - Dolfijn
  - Zeehond
- Balao-class submarine (Walrus-class submarine)
  - Walrus
  - Zeeleeuw
- Dolfijn-class submarine and Potvis-class submarine
  - Dolfijn
  - Potvis
  - Tonijn
  - Zeehond
- Zwaardvis-class submarine
  - Tijgerhaai
  - Zwaardvis
- Walrus-class submarine
  - Walrus
  - Zeeleeuw
  - Dolfijn
  - Bruinvis

== See also ==
- Royal Netherlands Navy Submarine Service
- Royal Netherlands Navy
- List of submarines of the Second World War
