= List of ship commissionings in 1926 =

The list of ship commissionings in 1926 is a chronological list of ships commissioned in 1926. In cases where no official commissioning ceremony was held, the date of service entry may be used instead.

	Operator	Ship	Class and type	Pennant	Other notes
18 January	Royal Netherlands Navy	HNLMS O 9	O 9-class submarine	O 9	
18 January	Royal Netherlands Navy	HNLMS O 11	O 9-class submarine	O 11	
21 January	Spanish Navy	B-6	B-class submarine	B-6	
25 March	Royal Netherlands Navy	HNLMS Flores	Flores-class gunboat	F 801	
29 March	Royal Netherlands Navy	HNLMS K XIII	K XI-class submarine	K XIII	
12 April	Royal Netherlands Navy	HNLMS Soemba	Flores-class gunboat		
26 May	Royal Netherlands Navy	HNLMS Sumatra	Java-class cruiser		
1 September	Royal Netherlands Navy	HNLMS O 10	O 9-class submarine	O 10	

== Sources ==
- http://www.netherlandsnavy.nl/Javacl.html
- http://www.netherlandsnavy.nl/Flores.htm
- https://web.archive.org/web/20131005094320/http://www.dutchsubmarines.com/classes/class_kxi.htm
- http://www.dutchsubmarines.com/classes/class_o9.htm
