= HNLMS Z 5 =

Z 5-class torpedo boat

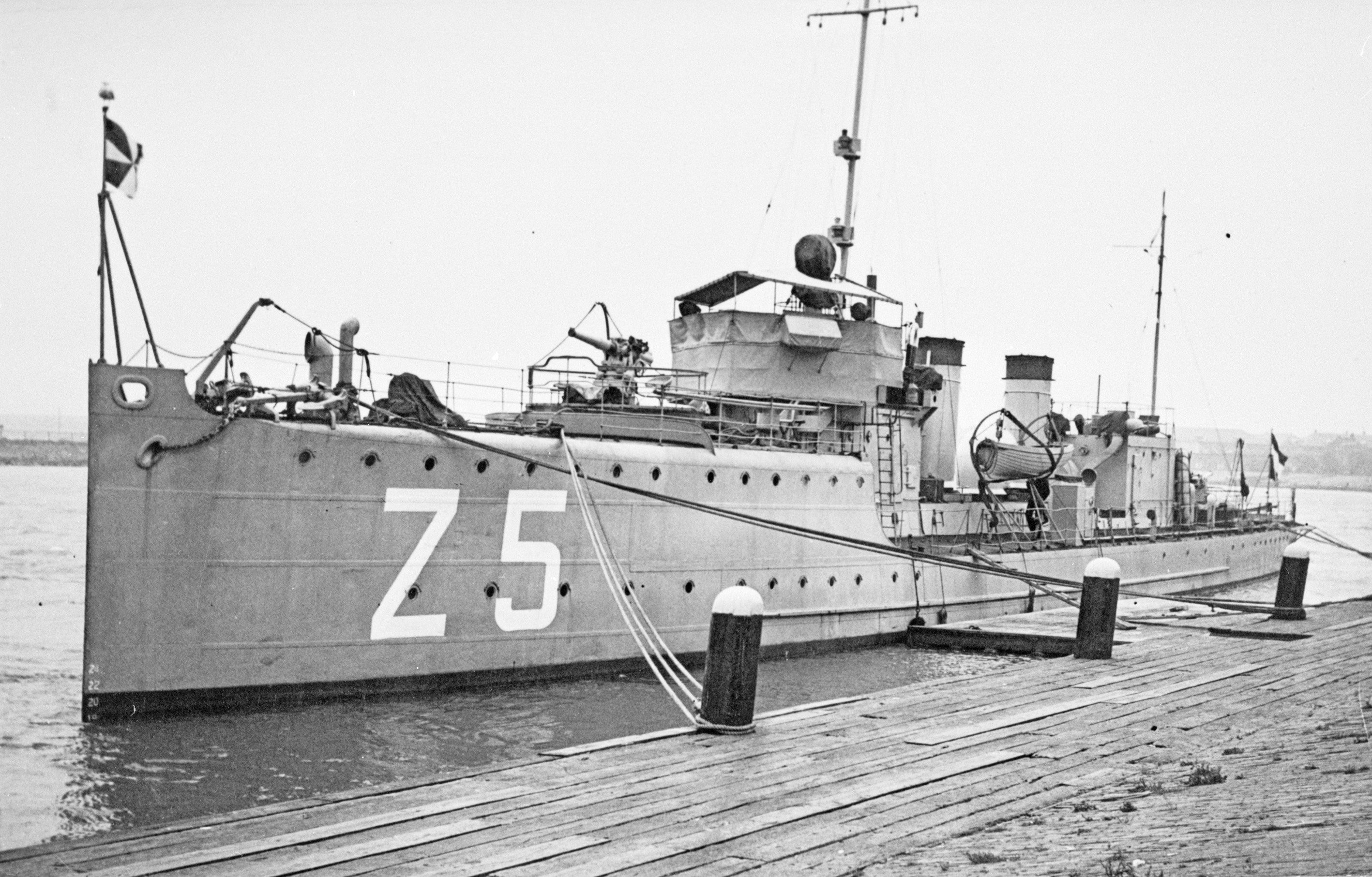
- Torpedo boat Z 5 after her refit.

History

Netherlands
- Name: HNLMS Z 5
- Builder: Koninklijke Maatschappij De Schelde
- Laid down: 18 February 1914
- Launched: 1 April 1915
- Commissioned: 8 February 1917
- Fate: Transferred to the Royal Navy on 2 March 1942

United Kingdom
- Name: HMS Z 5 (until May 1943), HMS Blade (after May 1943)
- Commissioned: 2 March 1942
- Fate: Returned to the Royal Netherlands Navy on 9 April 1945

Netherlands
- Acquired: 9 April 1945
- Stricken: 9 April 1945
- Fate: Sold to the West of Scotland Shipbreaking Company, scrapping completed on 20 December 1945.

General characteristics As completed
- Type: Torpedo boat
- Displacement: 263 tonnes (259 long tons) (standard)
- Length: 58.5 m (191 ft 11 in)
- Beam: 6.06 m (19 ft 11 in)
- Draft: 1.71 m (5 ft 7 in)
- Propulsion: 3 × cylindrical boilers; 2 × triple expansion engines; 5,500 hp (4,100 kW)
- Speed: 27 knots (50 km/h; 31 mph)
- Range: 425 nmi (787 km; 489 mi) at 20 knots (37 km/h; 23 mph)
- Complement: 48
- Armament: 2 × 75 mm (3.0 in) No. 4 guns; 2 × 0.5 in (13 mm) guns; 4 × 450 mm (18 in) torpedo tubes

General characteristics After the 1930 refit
- Type: Patrol boat
- Displacement: 263 tonnes (259 long tons) (standard)
- Length: 58.5 m (191 ft 11 in)
- Beam: 6.06 m (19 ft 11 in)
- Draft: 1.71 m (5 ft 7 in)
- Propulsion: 2 × cylindrical boilers; 2 × triple expansion engines; 3,000 hp (2,200 kW)
- Speed: 22 knots (41 km/h; 25 mph)
- Complement: 34
- Armament: 2 × 75 mm (3.0 in) No. 4 guns; 2 × 0.5 in (13 mm) guns; Depthchargethrowers

Z 5, also known as Blade, was a Z-class torpedo boat of the Dutch Koninklijke Marine which also served in the British Royal Navy. She served during World War II, escaping to England after the Dutch surrender during the Battle of the Netherlands. She was decommissioned in 1945.

== Service history ==
Z 5 was the first ship of the Z-class torpedo boats to be built in the Netherlands, with the initial Z 1 to Z 4 being built in Germany.

=== Pre-war service ===
The Netherlands stayed neutral in World War I and therefore Z 5 did not see action during that conflict.

On 10 June 1925 Z 5 went on a squadron exercise to the Baltic Sea with Jacob van Heemskerck, Marten Harpertszoon Tromp, K XI, O 8 and Z 3. During this exercise ports in Lithuania, Latvia, Estonia and Finland were visited before returning on 4 August.

Between 9 May and 8 August 1927, Z 5 went on exercises to Norway and the Baltic with Hertog Hendrik, O 10, O 11, Z 6, Z 7 and Z 8.

From 16 July until 28 July 1928, Z 5 visited Edinburgh together with Hertog Hendrik, O 10, Z 6 and Z 7.

Between 8 July and 8 August 1929, Z 5 went on exercises in the Baltic with Jacob van Heemskerck, O 9, O 10 and Z 6.

From 28 June until 10 July 1930, Z 5 visited Edinburgh together with Jacob van Heemskerck, O 8, O 9, O 10 and Z 7.

Between 1930 and 1931, Z 5 was rebuilt at the Rijkswerf Willemsoord to make her more fitted for duties in the Dutch West Indies. This included her propulsion being changed from three coal and oil stoked boilers to two oil stoked boilers, her torpedo tubes being removed and depth charge throwers and smoke screen machines being fitted. Her seaworthiness was improved as well. Due to all the changes the complement was reduced to 34.

Between 4 May and 20 June 1936, Z 5 went on exercises in the Baltic with Hertog Hendrik, O 9, O 10 and O 11.

=== World War II ===
During the early hours of 10 May 1940, Germany launched a surprise attack on the Netherlands as part of the operation to conquer France. On the same day, Z 5 was ordered to attack German positions in Rotterdam and did so successfully. Z 5 fired upon multiple enemy machine gun nests on the Maas bridges with her 75 mm guns while also successfully hitting German floatplanes with her 12.7 mm machine guns. On 14 May Z 5 set sail for England to avoid capture by the Germans and arrived on 17 May at Portsmouth. She underwent repairs before returning to service on 16 June.

From 16 June Z 5 was assigned to the British 9th Submarine Flotilla, where she was used as an escort for incoming and outgoing submarines and as a target ship. From 18 May 1941 Z 5 performed similar duties for the British 7th and 3rd Submarine flotillas. On 2 March 1942 Z 5 was transferred to the British Royal Navy, while her crew was transferred to the new Dutch destroyer Tjerk Hiddes.

In British service Z 5 performed all kinds of assistance and escort duties. Because of the striking, sharp bow, the British soon gave Z 5 the nickname "Razor Blade", before renaming her Blade in May 1943.

On 9 April 1945 the Royal Navy returned Blade to the Royal Netherlands Navy, which struck the ship right away. She was sold to the West of Scotland Shipbreaking Company, where she arrived on 23 October. Scrapping was completed on 20 December.
