= Naval history of the Netherlands =

The naval history of the Netherlands dates back to the 15th century. As overseas trade was a traditional cornerstone of the Dutch economy, naval defence was indispensable for the protection of commercial interests.

== Origins ==
At first the Dutch navy had a private character. Wealthy merchants and local authorities in the many ports of the Low Countries took initiative to arm ships since the 15th century and incidentally attacked pirates and foreign competitors. Defensive measures to protect the merchant ships could include sailing in a convoy and arming the merchants themselves. Offensive actions could include taking enemy ships by force. This was actively supported by the Dutch authorities in times of war, who handed out letters of marque, allowing Dutch captains to attack and, if possible capture enemy ships and their cargoes.

The central authorities tried, in vain, to increase supervision on these private navies. By decree of Maximilian of Austria, on 8 January 1488 the forerunner of the Dutch Navy was formed. The role of the navy had a legal status from then on, and the task of defending the country at sea was the responsibility of the Admiral of Flanders, later Admiral of the Netherlands, appointed by the sovereign. However, many provinces surreptitiously created small navies of their own, without informing the admiral.

== A world power ==
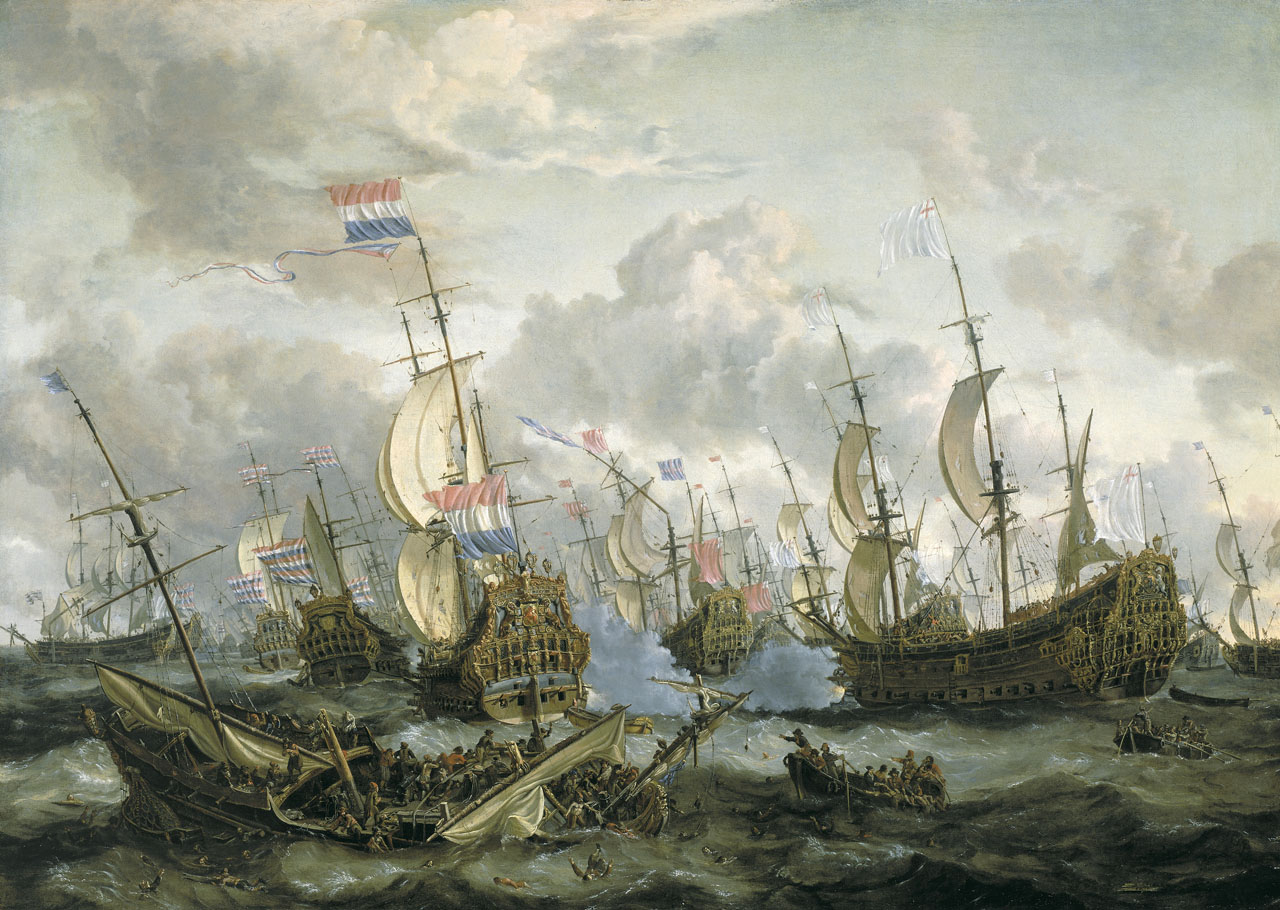
The Royal Prince and other vessels at the Four Days Fight, 11–14 June 1666 by Abraham Storck depicts a battle of the Second Anglo-Dutch War. In the foreground Swiftsure with Berkeley sinks. On the right the grounded Prince Royal with Admiral Ayscue surrenders by firing white smoke; de Ruyter on De Zeven Provinciën accepts. In between, HMS Royal Charles can just be seen with a broken mast.

The Dutch Revolt (1568–1648) in many ways started with the revolt of the Beggars and the navy was no exception. William the Silent, the leader of the revolt, issued letters of marque under his authority as sovereign Prince of Orange. These roving bands of ships became known as the Sea Beggars. Their capture of Brielle was the first significant victory of the revolt, and led to the entire province of Holland and Zealand declaring for the Prince and against the Habsburg overlord, Philip II of Spain and the Spanish government. As the revolt progressed into an independent government and state, the navy was reorganized into a better command structure. The government of the newly established Dutch Republic installed five admiralties (de Maze, Amsterdam, Zeeland, the Noorderkwartier, and Friesland) which had offices in Rotterdam, Amsterdam, Middelburg, Hoorn, Enkhuizen, and Dokkum (later Harlingen).

During the 17th century the Dutch Republic was involved in many wars, many of them at sea. The main goal of the Dutch navy was to protect shipping lanes all over the world and, if need be, to repel a naval invasion of Dutch territory.

Until 1648, Spain was the enemy; a Dutch States Navy fleet destroyed the main force of a large Spanish fleet still under construction at Gibraltar in 1607. Other activities included blocking the port of Antwerp and the Flemish coast (to prevent the Spanish troops there from getting supplies) and escorting the Dutch merchants in the Baltic.

In the course of the 17th century, Dutch maritime and commercial expansion led to increasing tensions with other European nations, most prominently England. When the anti-Dutch Navigation Ordinance of 1651 was passed, tensions ran high. During the First Anglo-Dutch War the English fleet concentrated on capturing the Dutch merchant fleet, which would prove vital to their victory. An example of this is the Battle of Dungeness in December 1652, in which Maarten Tromp was able to keep the Channel open for Dutch trade. In the Second Anglo-Dutch War five major battles took place, nearly all of them in English waters. The Dutch navy carried out the successful raid on the Medway in 1667, and the war ended soon after. The Third Anglo-Dutch War was in fact an alliance between France, England, Cologne and Münster to attack the Netherlands and end the dominance of the Dutch Republic over the seas.

Michiel Adriaenszoon de Ruyter, Lieutenant-Admiral of the United Provinces by Ferdinand Bol, painted 1667

Although the Dutch fleet was the largest of the world at the time, the combined fleet of France and England quickly put the Dutch in a defensive position, but due to the tactical brilliance of Michiel de Ruyter, it managed to inflict so much damage to both fleets in three consecutive battles in Dutch territorial waters at the nation's most anxious moment, that an invasion had to be called off. The Treaty of Westminster marked the end of the trade wars between the English and the Dutch. A new era arrived in 1688, when a new Anglo-French alliance seemed imminent; the Dutch stadtholder William III took a desperate gamble by sailing to England with a large fleet that landed in Torbay in Devon. He marched to London and toppled his father in law James II, who was in a very weak position then. William was proclaimed King of England, effectively making his greatest maritime rival an ally. In the 25 years after this 'Glorious Revolution' the Dutch and the English successfully fought together with various other allies against France, then at the height of its powers during the reign of Louis XIV. The naval war zone shifted from the North Sea and the English Channel to the French coast and Mediterranean. At the end of the War of the Spanish Succession (1713) the series of wars ended.

At the start of the 17th century, the squadrons of the Dutch fleet were reinforced with merchant ships adapted for battle in earlier conflicts. The introduction of the line-tactic increased the demand for ships with more manoeuvrability, speed and crew experience. In 1653, the Dutch government decided to build 60 ships, and ten years later they placed another order for 60 more. The flagship of the Republic, De Zeven Provinciën, was fitted with 96 guns. For comparison, the British HMS Victory, built more than a century later, had only 8 guns more.

With about 4,000 sailors the Dutch navy was a relatively small employer in peacetime, but in times of war thousands more were hired. Flag officers and captains were themselves responsible for hiring the ship's crew. Usually a ship's crew were hired for only one campaign, excluding the officers. Since the early 17th century, experienced captains were employed for long periods of time by the Dutch navy; they were responsible for the ships provisions, and when they bought supplies for less money than the government provided they could keep the rest, and a smart captain could make a small fortune this way in peacetime. In 1665, regiments of soldiers were deployed aboard the ships. These soldiers would later become famous and feared Dutch marines.

In the middle of the 17th century, the Dutch navy was the most powerful navy in the world.

== Decline and French domination ==
The Dutch Republic went into decline after 1713, and in the late 18th century its navy was no longer a match for the French and even less for the British navy. An ambitious shipbuilding program in 1780 could not prevent the disastrous Fourth Anglo-Dutch War (1780–1784); the Dutch agreed to allow British ships free passage throughout the East Indies in the Treaty of Paris which ended the war. Between 1783 and 1789 several naval squadrons were sent to Asia to support the Dutch East India Company.

Several major naval reforms concerning education and command structure took place after the Batavian Revolution (1795). The federative decentralised naval command was now replaced by a central organisation in The Hague, reflecting the increasingly centralised structure of the country. The warships stayed in the drydocks, although a number of ships managed to follow the fleeing stadtholder William V to Great Britain; others, like the ships sailing in East Asia, were later joined with the forces of William V.

After the surrender of a naval squadron at Saldanha Bay (1796) and the defeat at the Battle of Camperdown (1797), the surrender of the fleet near the Vlieter in 1799 proved to be the death of the Batavian Navy. In the three years (from 1810) the Netherlands were a part of Imperial France the navy was integrated with the French navy.

== Revival ==
The Netherlands regained their independence and on December 7, 1813, the Dutch navy was once again a part of the Dutch armed forces. The Dutch navy in the 19th century suffered from a constant shortage of manpower, forcing the government to hire crew from its colonies; this increased the total employees from 5000 in 1850 to over 10,000 in 1900. Between 1820 and 1890 the RNLN also gradually changed from a decentralized organization to a centralized organization.

In 1854 changes were made to the law related to corporal punishment in the navy, which led to some punishments no longer being allowed.

After the bankruptcy of the East India Company Dutch naval tasks shifted greatly towards East Asia, until some 60% of the entire navy was situated there around 1850. Alongside the Colonial Navy, administrative and civil tasks were carried out by the Government Navy.

== 1850s till World War II ==
After the disappearance of the ship of the line a whole array of ship classes and types were created. The invention of the propeller launched the mass use of steam-propelled ships. The first steam-powered frigate Admiraal van Wassenaar entered service in 1857. With the introduction of Ironclad warship in the early part of the second half of the 19th century the navy began to modernize the fleet with a series of monitors and two larger turret ram ships, Prins Hendrik der Nederlanden and Koning der Nederlanden. The first of these ships were purchased from foreign shipyards. But in 1867 the Rijkswerf in Amsterdam was the first to be modernized to build armored warships.

On 5 July 1882 the HNLMS Adder sunk off the coast of Scheveningen, which resulted in the death of 64 people. It is the largest peacetime loss of the Royal Netherlands Navy.

In the 1890s the navy again modernized with the construction of a series of protected cruisers and coastal defence ships. Since the country had become a kingdom, the Dutch navy was renamed the Royal Netherlands Navy in 1905.

The 1910s saw the introduction of the first submarines. Just before World War I the navy had plans to acquire several dreadnought battleships but the war prevented these from ever being built.

During the First World War there was strong support among naval officers to make greater use of conscripts within the navy. In 1917, the first airplanes were added to the navy.

After the war the navy acquired several light cruisers, destroyers and submarines. Just before World War II the navy planned to acquire several battlecruisers but like the dreadnoughts these were never built due to the war.

== World War II and decolonisation ==
During the Second World War the Dutch navy was based in Allied countries, due to the conquest in May 1940 of the Netherlands by Nazi Germany. The Dutch navy had its headquarters in London and smaller offices in Sri Lanka and Australia.

At the start of the Second World War on 10 May 1940 the Royal Netherlands Navy had three operational submarines in the Netherlands, namely HNLMS O 9, O 10 and O 13. O 11 was being repaired, while O 8 and O 12 were undergoing maintenance. Meanwhile, O 14 and O 15 were active at the time in the Caribbeans. Furthermore, seven submarines were in various stages of completion at different yards. On the other hand, the Dutch navy had 15 operational submarines in the Dutch East Indies. These submarines played an important role during the war, by confronting and sinking enemy ships. For example, HNLMS O 16 and K XVII sunk several Japanese ships in 1941. However, there were also losses in this theater, both HNLMS O 16 and K XVII were sunk in December 1941.

Around the world Dutch naval units were responsible for troop transport, for example during Operation Dynamo in Dunkirk and D-Day, they escorted convoys and attacked enemy targets. During the war the navy suffered heavy losses, especially in defence of the Dutch East Indies against the Japanese in the Battle of the Java Sea (February 1942) in which rear admiral Karel Doorman went down with most of his ships and with 2,300 of his crew.

The first women were employed as non-combatants in 1944, and took on combat functions in 1980.

On 27 November 1945 the RNLN established its own intelligence unit. This unit would later become known under the acronym MARID.

In 1946, the Netherlands had a total of seven operational submarines in service; HNLMS O 21, O 23, O 24, O 27, Dolfijn, Zwaardvisch and Tijgerhaai. Since the home port at Den Helder was in ruins, these submarines were for the time being using the Waalhaven in Rotterdam as base.

After the war, the relations between the Netherlands and its colonies also changed dramatically. The establishment of the Republic of Indonesia two days after the Japanese surrender cooled the Dutch plans for re-establishing its colonial authority. Meanwhile the RNLN had to deal with the growing piracy that had returned as a result of the power vacuum shortly after the war had ended. It took four years of war before the Netherlands acknowledged the independence of Indonesia. The Dutch navy was stationed in Western New Guinea until that too was turned over to the Indonesians in 1962, due to diplomatic intervention of the US and UN. In the Dutch Caribbean the RNLN expanded its forces after it was given operational command of this part of the Kingdom.

== Cold War and NATO cooperation ==
At the time of the creation of the North Atlantic Treaty Organization (NATO), the military focus was on the army and air force; it was not until the Korean War (1950–1953) that the navy got more recognition. The government allowed the creation of a balanced fleet consisting of two naval squadrons. Apart from the carrier HNLMS Karel Doorman, the Dutch navy consisted of four Dolfijn-class submarines, two De Zeven Provinciën-class cruisers, eight Friesland-class destroyers, four Holland-class destroyers, six Van Speijk-class frigates and a large number of minesweepers.

The Netherlands developed its defence policy in close cooperation with other NATO members. The establishment of the Warsaw Pact in 1955 intensified the arms race between West and East. Technical innovations rapidly emerged; the introduction of radar, sonar and guided missiles was particularly relevant for the navy. The RNLN also started looking at nuclear propulsion in the later half of the 1950s. This led to plans to build nuclear submarines during the 1960s. The Soviet Union-dominated Warsaw Pact was perceived as the main permanent threat; this made a fixed military strategy useful. From 1965 onwards the Netherlands joined certain permanent NATO squadrons like the Standing Naval Force Atlantic. In the 1960s the Soviet Union abandoned its traditional land based strategy and built up a navy with worldwide impact, with many submarines and even an aircraft carrier. The main task of NATO navies was the protection of shipping lanes across the Northern Atlantic between the NATO-allies in North America and western Europe.

== Current navy ==
After the fall of the Berlin Wall in November 1989 the international military situation changed drastically. Globally, new conflicts emerged and the borders between friend and foe seemed to gradually fade. NATO's reorientation of the organisation's goals created a more prominent role for the United Nations as international peacekeepers. From 1990 onwards navy units were engaged in conflicts in Cambodia, Eritrea, Ethiopia, Iraq, Afghanistan, Lebanon but also the Gulf War and the Yugoslavian conflict. The new goals of the Dutch navy were now changed to an expeditionary peacekeeping and peace enforcing force.

== Gallery of famous Dutch sea battles ==
The tradition of maritime painting was strong in the Netherlands, especially in the Golden Age, and one of the favourite topics was celebrating Dutch Naval victories.

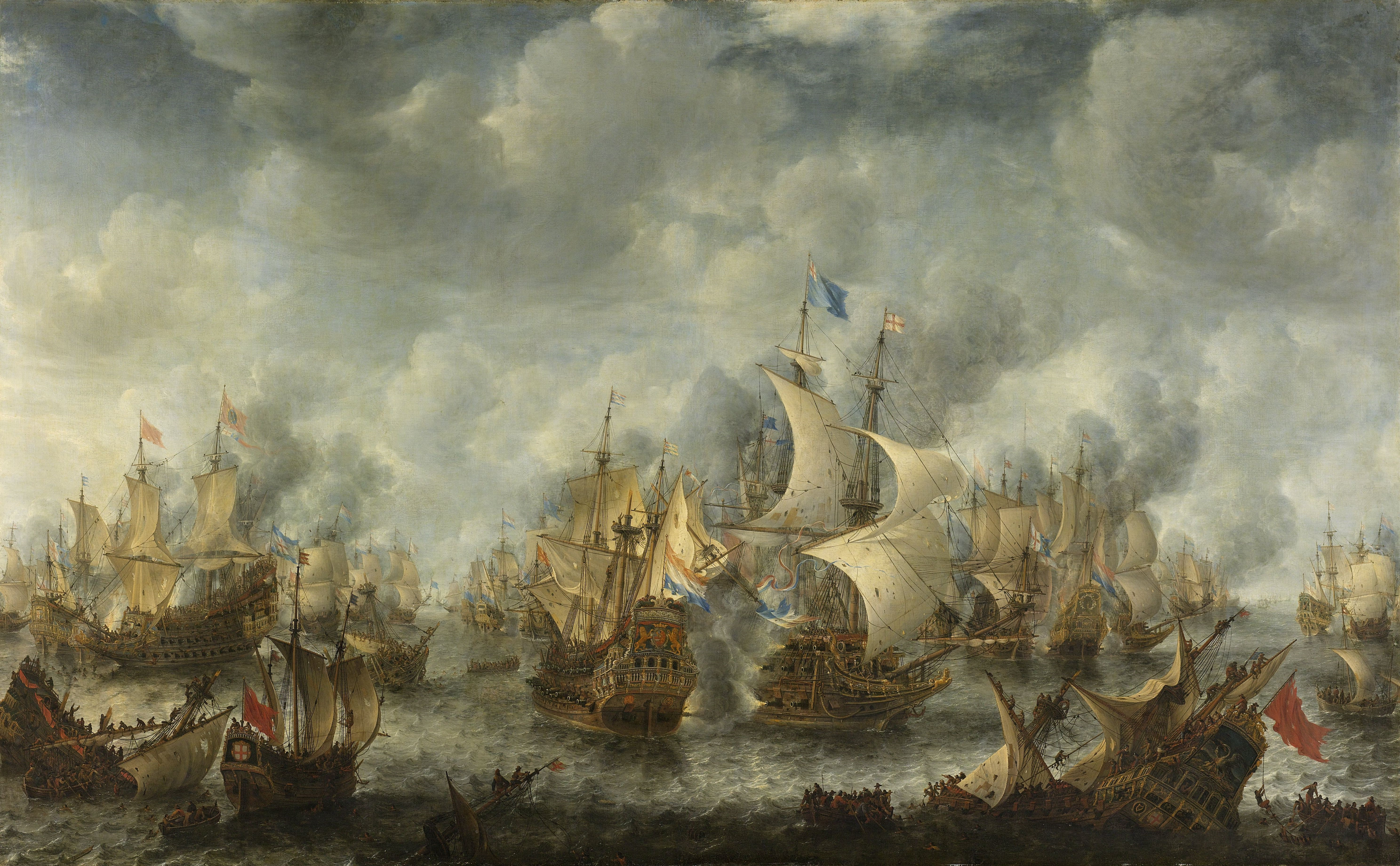
The Battle of Scheveningen, 31 July 1653 during the First Anglo-Dutch War (1652–54) by Jan Abrahamsz. Beerstraaten (1622–1666)

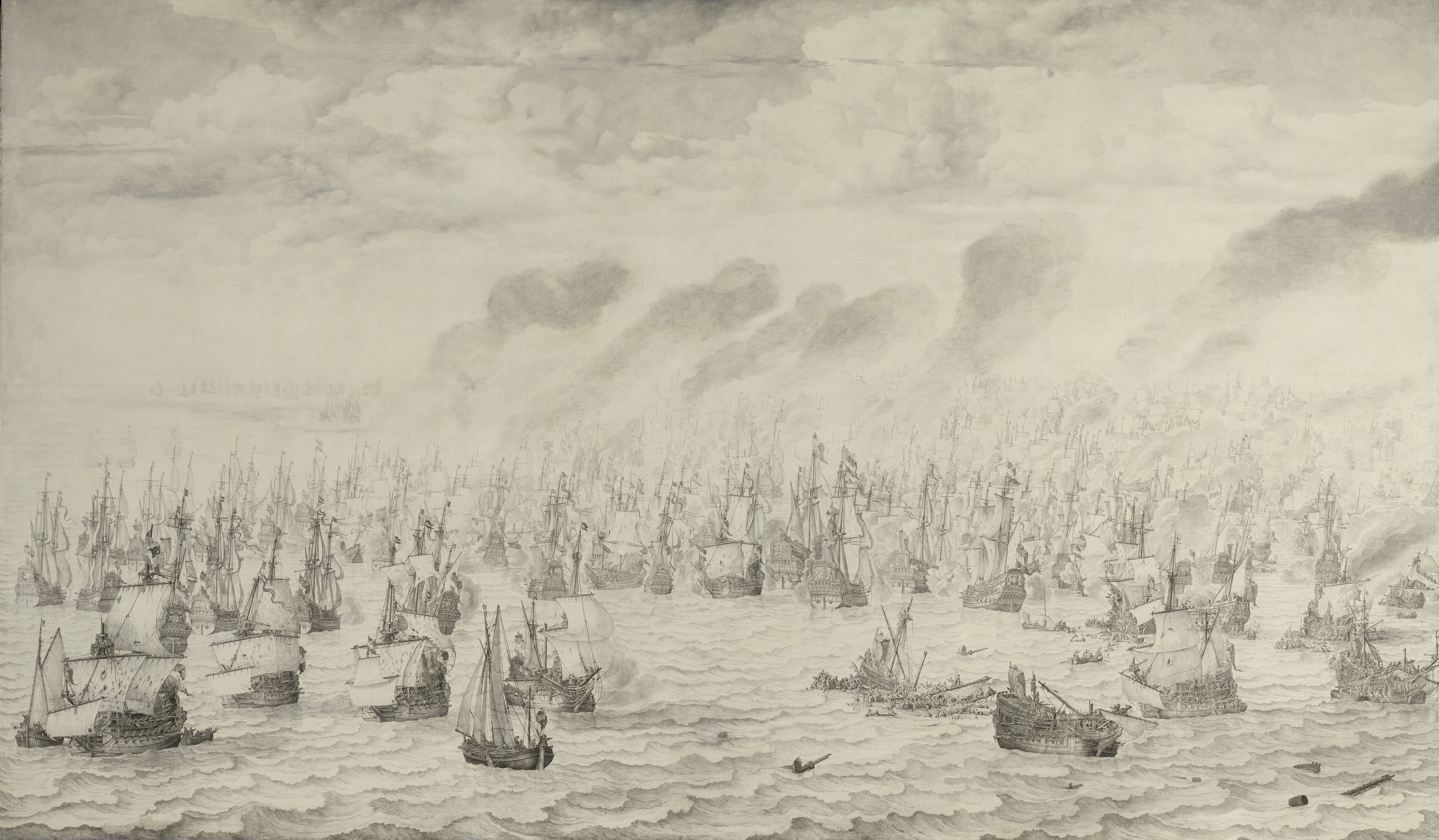
The Battle of Terheide, 10 August 1653: episode from the First Anglo-Dutch War (1652–54) by Willem van de Velde the elder, 1657

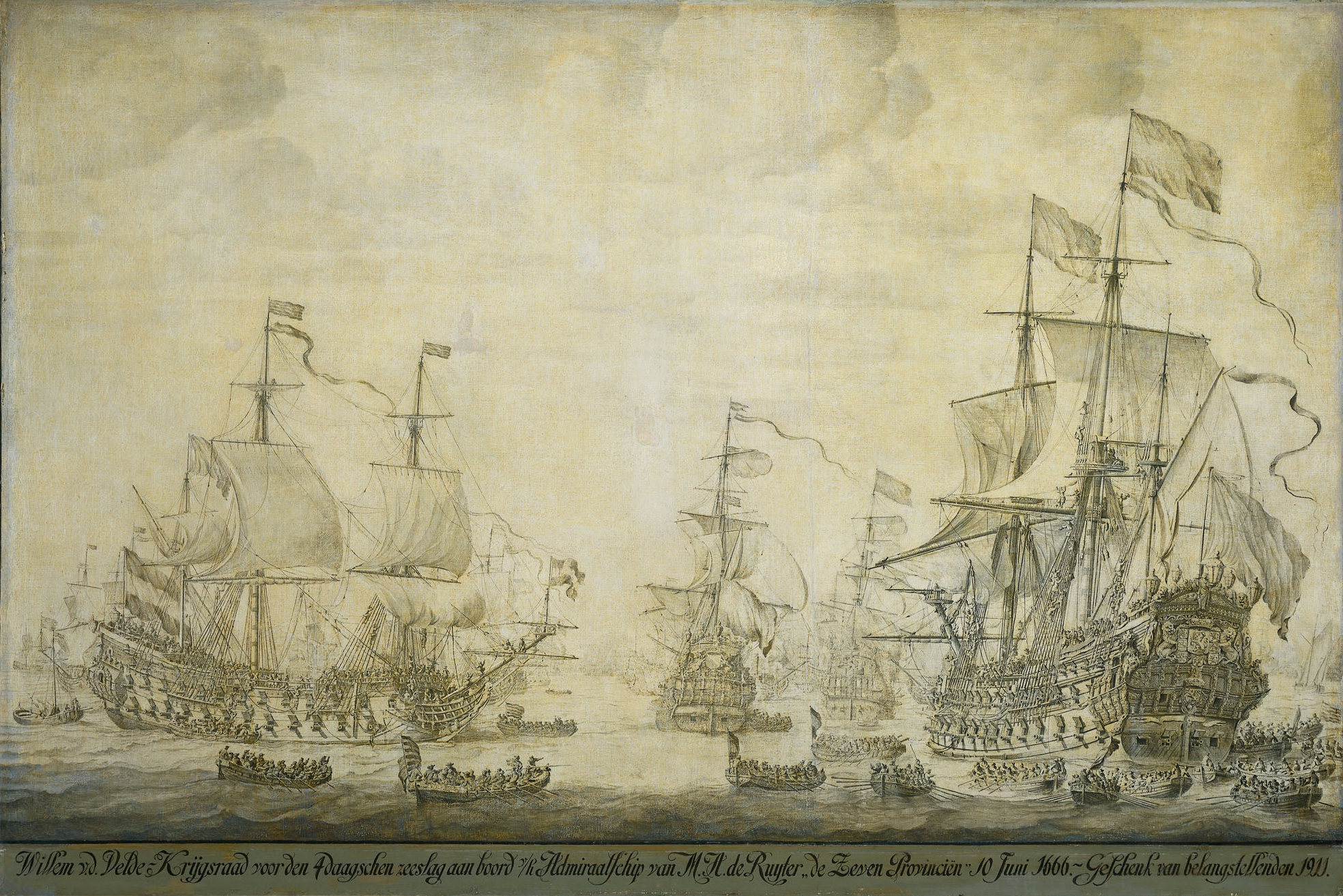
The Four Days' Battle Council on board the "Zeven Provincien", the flagship of Admiral de Ruyter, 10 June 1666, by Villem van de Velde the elder, 1693.

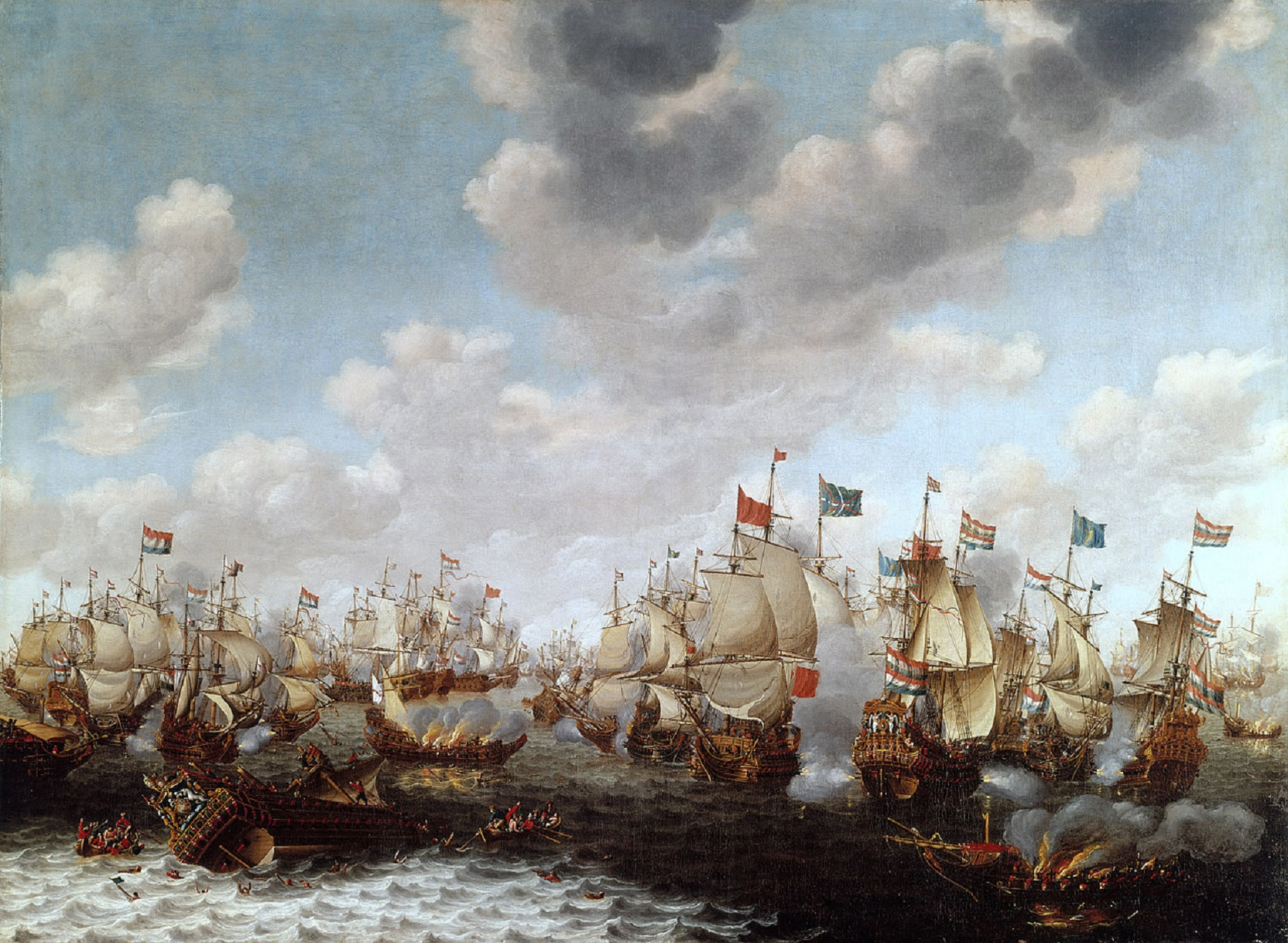
The Four Days Battle (June 1666) by Pieter Cornelisz. van Soest (fl. 1642–1667)

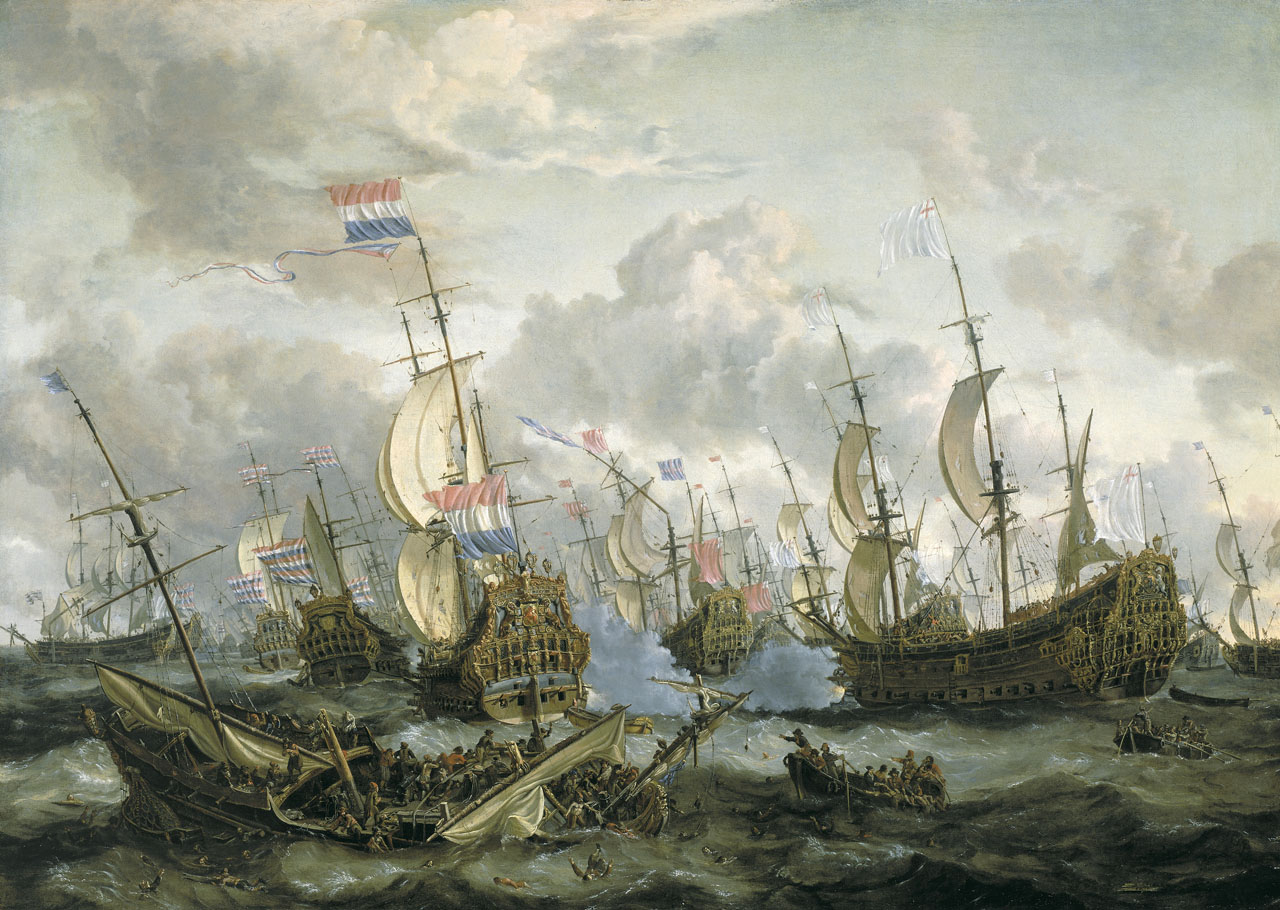
The famous painting of the Four Days Battle (June 1666) by Abraham Storck (1644–1708) showing de Ruyter's flagship, De Zeven Provincien engaged with the English flagship, Royal Prince.

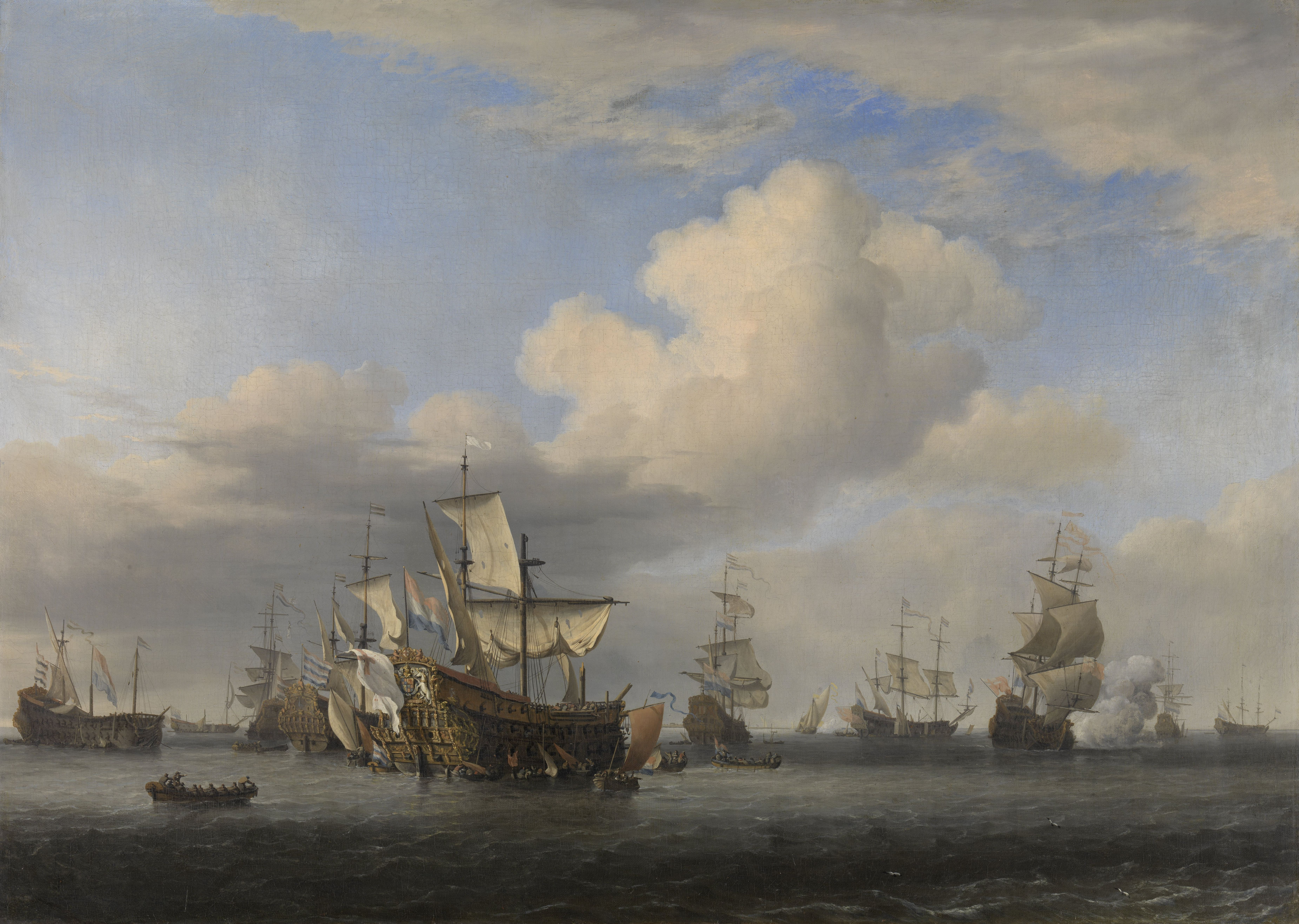
The four captured men-of-war - ‘Swiftsure,’ ‘Seven Oaks,’ ‘Loyal George,’ and ‘Convertine’ - brought into the Goereese Gat after the Four Day Battle at Sea, 11–14 June 1666: episode from the Second Anglo-Dutch War (1665–67) by Willem van de Velde the Younger (1633–1707)

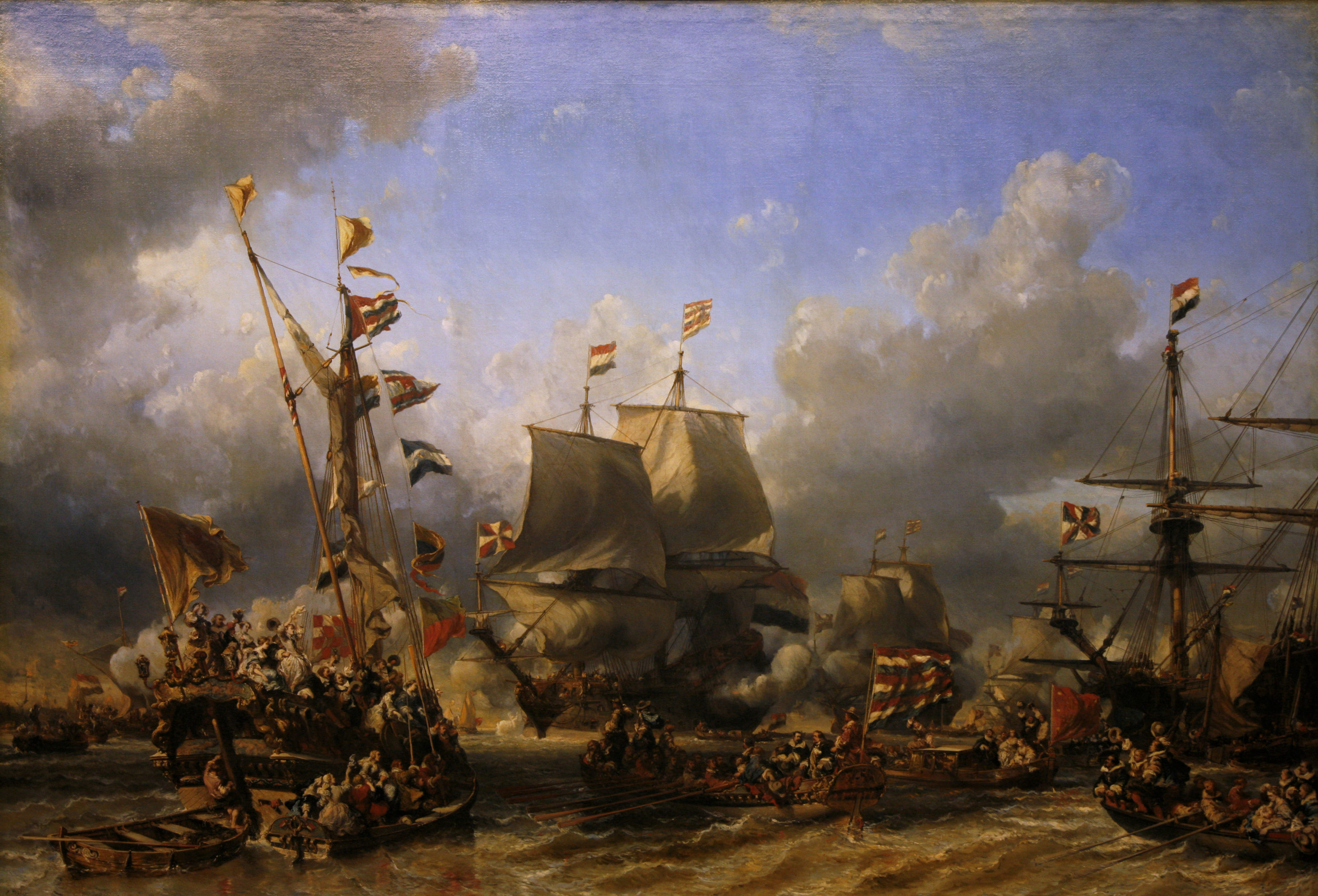
Embarkment of Michiel de Ruyter and Cornelis de Witt at Texel for the attack on the Medway by Eugène Isabey (1803–1886)

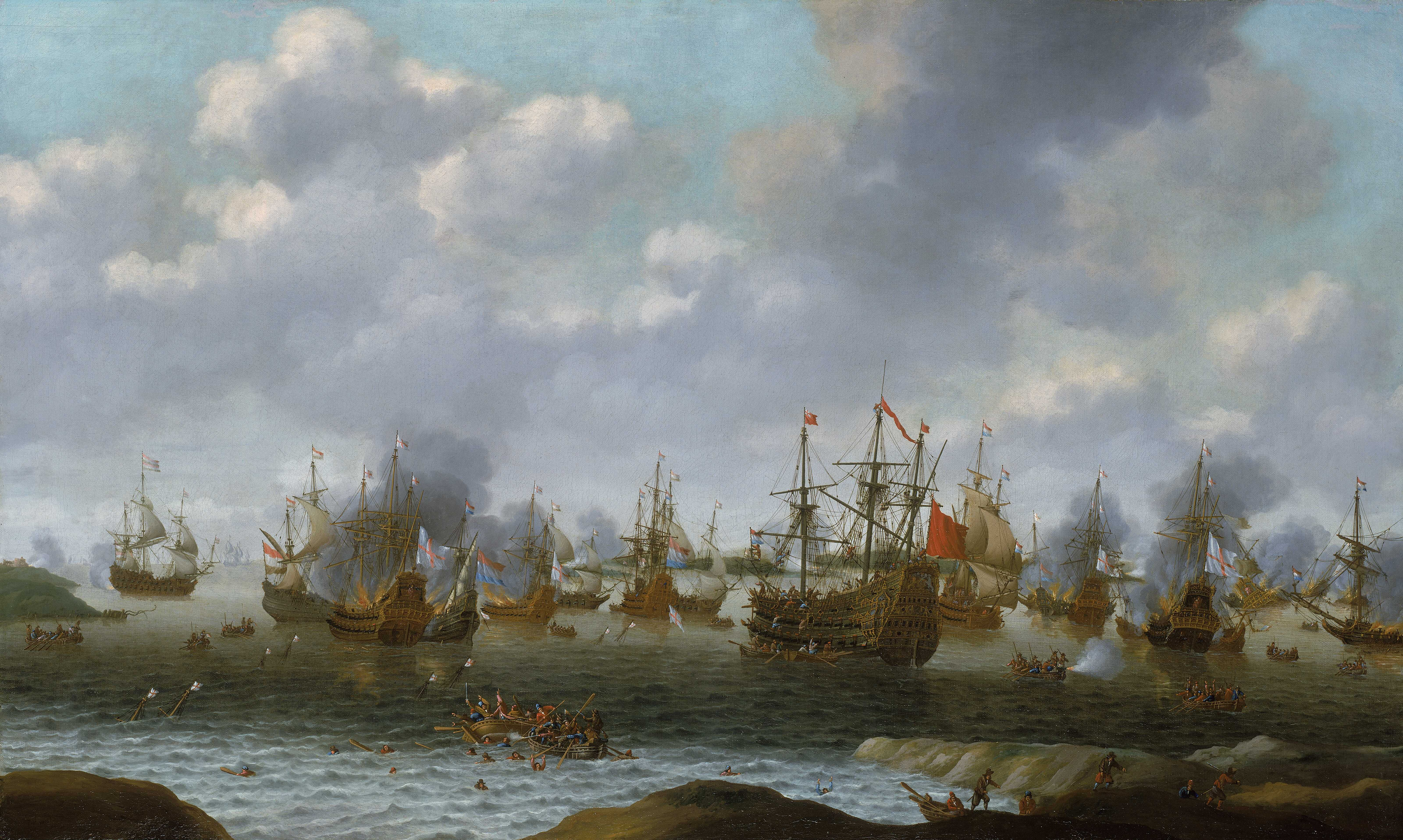
Dutch Attack on the Medway, June 1667 by Pieter Cornelisz van Soest, painted c. 1667. The captured ship Royal Charles is right of center.

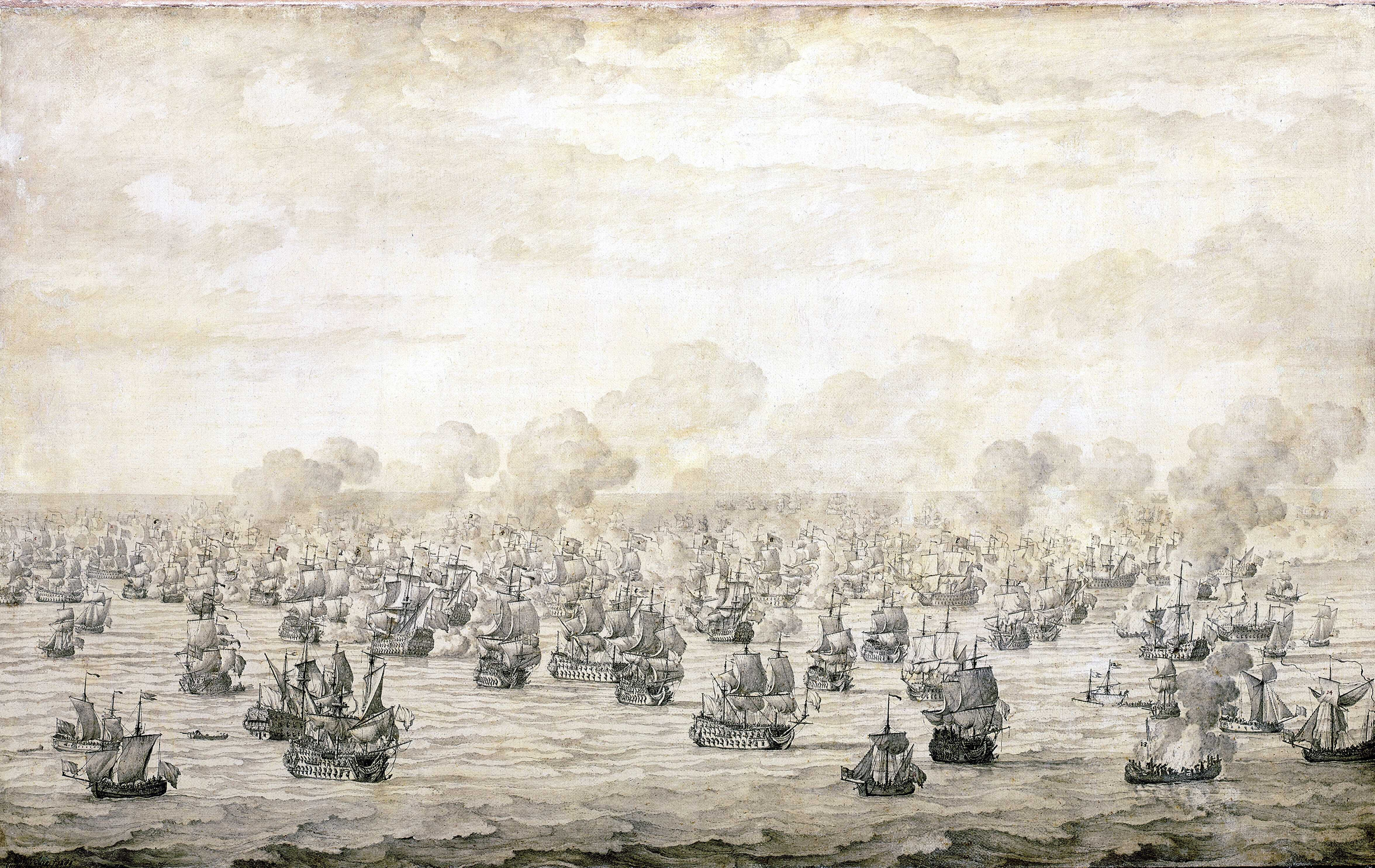
The First Battle of Schooneveld, 28 May 1673 during the Third Anglo-Dutch War.

== See also ==
- Royal Netherlands Navy
- Royal Netherlands Navy Submarine Service
