= HNLMS O 9 =

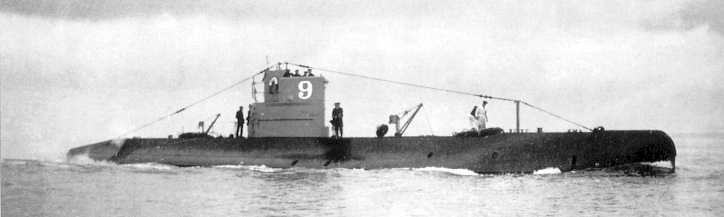
- O 9

History

Netherlands
- Name: O 9
- Builder: Koninklijke Maatschappij De Schelde, Flushing
- Laid down: 1 December 1923 or 23 September 1922
- Launched: 7 April 1925
- Commissioned: 18 January 1926
- Decommissioned: 1 December 1944
- Fate: Sold for scrap October 1946

General characteristics
- Class & type: O 9-class submarine
- Displacement: 526 tons surfaced; 656 tons submerged
- Length: 54.66 m (179 ft 4 in)
- Beam: 5.7 m (18 ft 8 in)
- Draught: 3.53 m (11 ft 7 in)
- Propulsion: 2 × 450 bhp (336 kW) diesel engines; 2 × 250 bhp (186 kW) electric motors
- Speed: 12 kn (22 km/h; 14 mph) surfaced; 8 kn (15 km/h; 9.2 mph) submerged
- Range: 3,500 nmi (6,500 km; 4,000 mi) at 8 kn (15 km/h; 9.2 mph) on the surface; 25 nmi (46 km; 29 mi) at 8 kn (15 km/h; 9.2 mph) submerged
- Complement: 29
- Armament: 2 × 21 inch bow torpedo tubes; 2 × 17.7 inch bow torpedo tubes; 1 × 17.7 inch stern torpedo tube; 1 x 88 mm gun; 1 x 12.7 mm machine gun

O 9 was an O 9-class patrol submarines of the Royal Netherlands Navy. The ship was built by Koninklijke Maatschappij De Schelde shipyard in Flushing.

== Design ==
In 1927 a protruding Telefunken radiopeiler was installed on the O 9 that allowed the boat to receive long wave radio frequencies underwater.

In February 1943 the O 9 was equipped with a fire control system that was developed by its commander Drijfhout van Hooff and manufactured by Cambridge Instrument Company Ltd.

== Service history ==
The submarine was ordered on 30 August 1921 and laid down in Flushing at the shipyard of Koninklijke Maatschappij De Schelde on 1 December 1923 or 23 September 1922. The launch took place on 7 April 1925. On 18 January 1926 the ship is commissioned in the Dutch navy.

21 June 1926, O 9, together with O 11, Maarten Harpertszoon Tromp, Jacob van Heemskerck, Z 7 and Z 8, sailed from Den Helder to the Baltic Sea to visit the ports of Kiel, Gothenburg and Trondheim.

In 1929 O 9, O 10, Jacob van Heemskerck, Z 5, Z 6, made a trip to the Baltic Sea for exercises. The next year on 30 July 1930 O 9, O 10, Jacob van Heemskerck and Witte de With visited Antwerp.

In 1931 O 9, O 10, O 8, Jacob van Heemskerck, Z 7 and Z 8, made again a trip to the Baltic Sea for exercises. She sailed for the Baltics again in 1936 with her sisters O 10, O 11 and Hertog Hendrik and Z 5. In 1939 O 9 together with her sisters O 10, O 11 were attached to the coastal division. They acted as the offensive part of Dutch coastal defense.

From 9 to 11 May 1940 she and O 10 are on patrol off the coast of the Netherlands. During the patrol O 9 was attacked by German military airplanes. 12 May 1940 she, O 10 and a tugboat fled to the United Kingdom where they arrived on 15 May 1940. While in the UK the O 9 was docked regularly for maintenance, which was needed because it was an old submarine.

During the war she patrolled the English Channel and the Bay of Biscay. From August 1940 to March 1944 O 9 was attached to the 7th Training Flotilla in Rothesay and used as an ASDIC piggy boat. 1 December 1944 O 9 was decommissioned and September 1945 stricken. October 1946 she was sold for scrapping.
