= BV 3-class patrol ship =

World War II Dutch auxiliary patrol boat

History

Netherlands
- Name: BV 3
- Builder: Jan Smit Czn., Alblasserdam
- Laid down: 1938
- Launched: 1938
- Commissioned: August 1939
- Decommissioned: 1947
- Renamed: Amsterdam (1938 + 1940-1947)
- Fate: Sold to Union de Remorquage et de Sauvetage S.A., Antwerp in 1947

General characteristics
- Type: Patrol tug
- Displacement: 368 t (362 long tons) standard
- Length: 42.57 m (139 ft 8 in)
- Beam: 8.63 m (28 ft 4 in)
- Draught: 4.57 m (15 ft 0 in)
- Installed power: 1,300 hp (970 kW)
- Propulsion: 1 x Triple expansion
- Speed: 14 knots (26 km/h; 16 mph)
- Complement: 15
- Armament: 1 × 12 cm (4.7 in) cannon; 1 × 7.5 cm (3.0 in) cannon; 2 x 12.7 mm (0.50 in) machine gun

HNLMS BV 3 was a Royal Netherlands Navy patrol boat. Originally laid down as the tugboat Amsterdam in 1938, she would soon after be commandeered and militarized. One of many militarized tugs, she was the only tug to be armed with a 12 cm (4.7 in) cannon. BV 3 was an acronym for Bewakingsvaartuig 3, Dutch for Guard vessel 3.

== Service history ==
BV 3 collided with the submarine HNLMS O 11 on 6 March 1940. Three crewmembers of the submarine were killed in the collision. Additionally, O 11 was still being repaired when the invasion of the Netherlands occurred. As a result, the crew of O 11 scuttled the submarine, but the wreck was captured by the Germans.

On 14 May 1940 HNLMS BV 3 escaped to England together with the torpedo boat HNLMS G 13. Once arrived, most of her weaponry was removed. The vessel was renamed Amsterdam and served out the remainder of the war as a tugboat in the Rescue Tug Section of the Royal Navy.

After the end of World War II, Amsterdam returned to the Netherlands and was eventually sold to Union de Remorquage et de Sauvetage S.A. of Antwerp, in 1947.
