= HNLMS K XI =

Submarine of the Royal Netherlands Navy

History

Netherlands
- Name: HNLMS K XI
- Ordered: 3 September 1921
- Builder: Maatschappij Fijenoord, Rotterdam
- Yard number: 294
- Laid down: 9 December 1922
- Launched: 24 April 1924
- Commissioned: 24 March 1925
- Decommissioned: 11 April 1945
- Fate: Stripped and scuttled, 1945/46

General characteristics
- Class & type: K XI-class submarine
- Displacement: Surfaced; 688 long tons (699 t); Submerged; 828 long tons (841 t)
- Length: 66.7 m (218 ft 10 in)
- Beam: 6.15 m (20 ft 2 in)
- Draught: 3.78 m (12 ft 5 in)
- Propulsion: 2 × 6-cylinder 1,200 hp (895 kW) MAN diesel engines; 2 × 327 hp (244 kW) electric motors; 2 shafts
- Speed: Surfaced; 17 knots (31 km/h; 20 mph) surfaced; Submerged; 8 kn (15 km/h; 9.2 mph)
- Range: Surfaced; 3,500 nmi (6,500 km; 4,000 mi) at 8 kn (15 km/h; 9.2 mph); Submerged; 25 nmi (46 km; 29 mi) at 8 kn (15 km/h; 9.2 mph)
- Test depth: 60 m (200 ft)
- Complement: 31
- Armament: 2 × 21 inch bow torpedo tubes; 2 × 17.7 inch bow torpedo tubes; 2 × 17.7 inch stern torpedo tubes; 1 x 88 mm Bofors gun; 1 x 12.7 mm machine gun

HNLMS K XI was the first of three K XI-class submarines of the Royal Netherlands Navy, built to serve as a patrol vessel in the Dutch colonies.

== Ship history ==
K XI was built by the Fijenoord shipyard at Rotterdam. Before departing for the Dutch East Indies she sailed on an exhibition tour to the Baltic Sea along with the submarine O 8, the pantserschip Marten Harpertzoon Tromp and Jacob Van Heemskerck, and the torpedo boats Z3 and Z5. During the tour the ships visited ports in Lithuania, Latvia, Estonia and Finland.

Finally, on 15 October 1925, K XI, under the command of First Lieutenant G.E.V.L. Beckman, departed for the Dutch East Indies. During the first part of the voyage to Tunis, Prof. Dr. F.A. Vening Meinesz was on board in order to conduct gravity measurements. On 28 December 1925 K XI arrived in Sabang.

=== World War II ===
From the German attack on the Netherlands in 1940 until the moment Japan declared war, K XI operated out of Surabaya. In early 1941 K XI was part of the 2nd Division of the Dutch East Indies Submarine Flotilla, with K X, K XII and K XIII. From 8 December 1941 to 23 January 1942, K XI fell under British operational command and conducted patrols east of Malaya.

From 23 January 1942 until the fall of Dutch East Indies in March 1942 K XI was in maintenance. During this time the ship conducted only one patrol west of Sumatra. Because of the fall of the Dutch East Indies, K XI fled to Colombo. During the voyage to Colombo, K XI picked up survivors from the sloop HMAS Yarra, depot ship Anking and Dutch ship Parigi, attacked and sunk by a Japanese fleet.

In Colombo K XI was under British operational command. The ship was used as a target ship by the Royal Navy and the Royal Indian Navy for ASW and ASDIC exercises. At the request of the Royal Navy K XI was transferred to Fremantle, Australia, on 20 February 1945, arriving on 22 March. K XI was decommissioned in early April 1945.

=== Fate ===
K XI was towed to HMAS Leeuwin III (Royal Freshwater Bay Yacht Club) where she was partially stripped and the deck gun was donated as a memento to the Yacht Club. K XI was then handed over to the Royal Australian Navy in Fremantle for transmission to the Australian Disposal Committee. Towed down river at North Quay it sank after a valve was left open. The submarine was salvaged six weeks later, K XI was stripped further before being towed out to the Rottnest ship graveyard site west of Rottnest Island and scuttled in September 1946.

K XI was found south of Rottnest Island by the technical diving group Wrecksploration of Andrew Oakeley, David Jackson and Patrick Morrison on 1 January 2025. It was recorded using photogrammetry by Wrecksploration on 11 January 2025, with the Western Australian Museum confirming its identity. The wreck is located at a depth of around 40 metres (130 ft) and can be visited by divers. It is still unknown why the wreck is not located at the Rottnest ship graveyard as originally intended when it was scuttled in 1946. A possible explanation is that the submarine sank before it reached the graveyard.

== Sources ==
- Bastock, John (1975). Australia's Ships of War. Cremorne, NSW: Angus and Robertson. ISBN 978-0-207-12927-8. OCLC 2525523.
- Morrison, Patrick; Jackson, David; Oakeley, Andrew; Philpin, Aurora; Manders, Martijn; Anderson, Ross (2025). Dutch K XI Submarine (1925-1946) discovered off Wadjemup Rottnest Island, Perth (PDF) (Report). Western Australian Museum.
