= HNLMS O 16 =

Dutch submarine

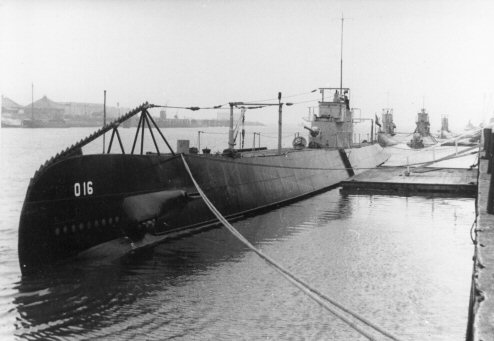
- O 16 in 1938

History

Netherlands
- Name: O 16
- Operator: Royal Netherlands Navy
- Builder: Koninklijke Maatschappij De Schelde
- Laid down: 28 December 1933
- Launched: 27 January 1936
- Commissioned: 16 October 1936
- Home port: 1936–1939 Den Helder; 1939–1941 Surabaya; 1941 Singapore
- Identification: 16
- Fate: Sunk by mine on 15 December 1941

General characteristics
- Type: Unique submarine
- Displacement: 984 tons surfaced; 1194 tons submerged
- Length: 76.53 m (251 ft 1 in)
- Beam: 6.55 m (21 ft 6 in)
- Draught: 3.97 m (13 ft 0 in)
- Propulsion: 2 × 1,600 bhp (1,193 kW) diesel engines; 2 × 460 bhp (343 kW) electric motors
- Speed: 18 knots (33 km/h; 21 mph) surfaced; 9 knots (17 km/h; 10 mph) submerged
- Range: 10,000 nmi (19,000 km; 12,000 mi) at 12 knots (22 km/h; 14 mph) surfaced; 26 nmi (48 km; 30 mi) at 8.5 knots (15.7 km/h; 9.8 mph) submerged
- Test depth: 80 m (262 ft)
- Complement: 36–42
- Armament: 4 × 21 in (533 mm) bow torpedo tubes; 2 × 21 in (533 mm) stern torpedo tubes; 2 × 21 in (533 mm) torpedo tubes external-traversing amidships; 1 x Bofors 80 mm gun on deck; 2 x Vickers 40 mm AA machine guns

HNLMS O 16 was a submarine of the Royal Netherlands Navy that saw service during World War II. She was the first submarine of the RNN manufactured from high-quality Steel 52, with the ability to dive at a depth of 80 metres (260 ft).

== Design ==
HNLMS O 16 was designed by chief engineer of the Royal Netherlands Navy, G. de Rooij. It was the first submarine he designed as chief engineer; the previous submarines having been designed by his predecessor, Johannes van der Struijf. The O 16 was equipped with a Navigation HorschGerat (NHG) in 1935: the starboard and port sides of the submarine were fitted with a single receiver each for receiving nautical signals and nine receivers operating at 1050 Hertz for detecting noise from targets. The installation (GZE 2825 bH) was provided by the German Altas-Werke. The lead cables were supplied by the Royal Netherlands Navy. The direction of a sound source could be determined by alternately listening to the (amplified) signal received by the starboard and port side receivers.

The submarine was 4 metres (13 ft) longer and 130 tons heavier than the most recent submarines (ex. K XVII), yet remained faster. De Rooij attributed the increase in speed and weight to his design, which was based on research done in Wageningen. The submarine hull was shaped differently and was designed from high-quality steel (German steel 'St52'), increasing tensile strength and elasticity, and giving it more speed. Furthermore, the forward torpedo tubes were set more apart from each other to reduce the chance of the torpedoes colliding.

The inside of O 16 was also different from previous submarines of the RNN, hosting such amenities as a refrigerator and multiple sinks for the crew. The design of O 16 was such a success that the Polish Navy ordered four submarines based on this design, resulting in the Polish submarines ORP Orzeł and ORP Sęp.

== Ship history ==
Dutch newsreel of O 16 passing HNLMS Hertog Hendrik in 1937

=== Commissioning ===
O 16 was laid down on 28 December 1933, at the Koninklijke Maatschappij De Schelde, Vlissingen, and launched on 27 January 1936. On 16 October, she was commissioned in the RNN. At the time of her commissioning, she was the largest submarine in the RNN. Her shakedown cruise took place from 11 January until 6 April 1937.

During the shakedown cruise, the submarine was under command of LTZ1 C.J.W. van Waning. The trip was marked by bad weather and uneasy sea, causing disruptions for the crew. Many became seasick and could not do their duty, and preparing food was hard. The shakedown trip took O 16 to the port of Hamilton, Bermuda (5 February 1937), Norfolk, Virginia (13–14 February), and Washington, D.C. (15–24 February). During their time in Washington, Commander van Waning and one of the guests aboard the submarine, F. A. Vening Meinesz were granted an audience with American President Franklin D. Roosevelt. After the trip to Washington, O 16 resumed its journey to Ponta Delgada (7–8 March) and Lisbon (12 March). The Spanish Civil War was taking place during this time, which led General Francisco Franco to block access of ships to the Mediterranean Sea with the aid of the Royal Italian Navy.

The Dutch government therefore ordered O 16 to escort ships and perform convoy duties, she performed these together with other ships of the RNN. For example, on 18 March 1937, O 16 performed convoy duties together with HNLMS Hertog Hendrik. Finally, on 1 April, O 16 went home to the Netherlands to finish her shakedown cruise, arriving at the Dutch port of Den Helder on 16 April.

Between 16 April 1937 and 12 December 1938, O 16 took part in multiple events and helped the RNN with torpedo developments. Some notable events O 16 took part in include a fleet demonstration off the coast of Scheveningen on 3 September. This demonstration took place to celebrate Wilhelmina of the Netherlands being queen and head of state of the Netherlands for 40 years. After these events, O 16 was taken out of service between 12 December 1938 and mid-April 1939, for her biennial maintenance. The maintenance happened at the Rijkswerf te Willemsoord in Den Helder.

=== Dutch East Indies ===
In 1939, O 16 was sent to the Dutch East Indies via the Suez Canal and attached to the submarine division there. This made her the first O series submarine that went to the Dutch East Indies; normally only K series submarines were sent to the colony. During her journey to the colony, she came across and docked at several ports, such as Lisbon, Port Said and Aden. O 16 finally reached her destination, Tanjung Priok, on 5 June 1939.

Soon after the Netherlands surrendered to Germany in 1940, the situation in Southeast Asia also degraded. A Japanese attack was expected, while there were also rumors of German raiders who had their eyes on the Dutch East Indies. To this end, O 16 among other ships was sent on patrol around the Dutch East Indies to catch these German raiders. In September 1940, O 16 and K XVIII were sent from Tanjung Priok to shadow the steamship Lematang and tanker Olivia, during their trip from Durban to Lourenço Marques, with the intention to sink any possible German raider.

Besides these missions, O 16 was mostly kept docked in the port of Soerabaja, while the RNN, United States Navy, Royal Australian Navy and the British Royal Navy debated over how their possible alliance against Japan would take form (such as deciding who commands what ships). Only in November did the Dutch government-in-exile in London decide that submarine division I, to which O 16 belonged, would come under British command.

=== World War II ===
After being put under British command, O 16 was sent on multiple patrol missions. This started in November 1941, when she was sent on patrol in the South China Sea. Her home-port also changed to Singapore as a result. On 6 December 1941, O 16 was sent to patrol the Gulf of Siam. During this patrol, O 16 spotted two Japanese destroyers, however, since there was no war with Japan no torpedoes were launched.

This situation changed a day later, on 7 December, when Japan attacked Pearl Harbor. This resulted in war with the Japanese, while the Dutch government also decided to put two more submarine divisions under British command, for a total of three out of the four Dutch submarine divisions. On the night of 8 to 9 December, two Japanese destroyers were seen by O 16 but were not pursued.

On 9 December, at 9 p.m., O 16 received a message from British command to sail for the coast of Siam together with other submarines in divisions I and II. The reason for this was that a large number of Japanese troop transports were spotted off the coast. The following day, on 11 December at 6 a.m., the submarines were ordered to set course for the east coast of the Malay Peninsula, between Kota Bharu and Singora. Japanese troopships were spotted there and the submarines were meant to sink them. Earlier that night, however, O 16 had spotted a Japanese troopship and launched three torpedoes, but because of the bad weather the crew could not confirm if they had hit and sunk the ship. The next day, on 12 December, O 16 once again spotted a Japanese troopship heading towards Pattani. Anton Bussemaker, commander of O 16, gave the order to follow the ship.

Eventually, the troopship moored in the Bay of Soengei Patani, around 9:30 p.m., where more Japanese troopships were seen as Lieutenant Huibert van Eijnsbergen maneuvered O 16 into the bay. The bay was only 11 metres (36 ft) deep so O 16 had to stay on the surface while she approached the moored troopships using electric motors to make as little noise as possible. Escape was unlikely in the event of her being seen; the troopships were equipped with guns that were used to protect against ships and surfaced submarines. Four torpedoes were launched at four different troopships. After the four torpedoes hit their targets and exploded, two more torpedoes were launched, resulting in three Japanese troopships partially sinking in the shallow waters of the bay and one only slightly damaged. Nonetheless, the crew of O 16 held this achievement in high regard, and retreated to their home-port in Singapore with only one torpedo left.

=== Loss ===
On 15 December 1941, during her homebound voyage to Singapore, O 16 hit a Japanese naval mine near Tioman Island, while leaving the Gulf of Siam. Only one man out of the crew of 42 survived. The survivor, quartermaster Cor de Wolf, managed to swim to Dayang Island, and eventually got in contact with the Royal Netherlands Navy, which brought him to Singapore.

The wreck of O 16 was not found until 1995, when a Swedish diver, named Sten Sjostrand, came across the wreck. He suspected it to be O 16, and contacted the Dutch newspaper AD, who then put him in contact with the RNN. They confirmed the identity of the ship, and an expedition was organized which included people from the navy, two newspapers, and two descendants of Commander Bussemaker.

They met with Sjostrand on 24 October 1995, in Tioman to seek the wreck and confirm its identity. On 26 October, at 4 a.m., an expedition team consisting of Sjostrand and four other divers went on the boat Cadenza, to the location of the wreck, which was located 22 miles northeast of Tioman and at a diving depth of 53 meters. At its location, the divers tried and failed to find the name of the ship on the hull. Instead, they recorded during their dive sessions, and later compared what they recorded with the designs of O 16. From there, they were able to confirm that the wreck was indeed O 16.

In October 2013, a crane vessel was photographed dredging up the wreck of O 16 for sale as scrap metal.

== Raiding history ==
11 December 1941
Japanese troopship Ayatosan Maru, 9,788–7,170 tons, damaged
12 December 1941
Japanese troopship Tosan Maru, 8,666 tons, sunk
Japanese troopship Asosan Maru, 8,812 tons, sunk
Japanese troopship Kinka Maru, 9,396 tons, sunk
Japanese troopship Ayatosan Maru, 9,788 tons, damaged

== See also ==
- List of submarines of the Netherlands
