= O 9-class submarine =

Class of submarine used by the Royal Netherlands Navy to patrol its own waters

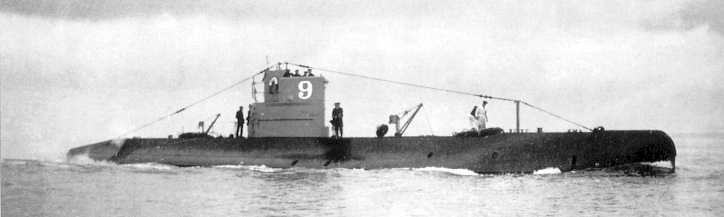
- HNLMS O 9

Class overview
- Name: O 9 class
- Builders: Koninklijke Maatschappij De Schelde, Flushing; Nederlandsche Scheepsbouw Maatschappij, Amsterdam; Fijenoord, Rotterdam
- Operators: Royal Netherlands Navy
- Preceded by: HNLMS O 8
- Succeeded by: O 12 class
- Built: 1923–1926
- In commission: 1926–1944
- Completed: 3
- Lost: 1

General characteristics
- Type: Submarine
- Displacement: 526 tons surfaced; 656 tons submerged
- Length: 54.66 m (179 ft 4 in)
- Beam: 5.7 m (18 ft 8 in)
- Draught: 3.53 m (11 ft 7 in)
- Propulsion: 2 × 450 bhp (336 kW) diesel engines; 2 × 250 bhp (186 kW) electric motors; 120 cells battery (4350 Ah)
- Speed: 12 kn (22 km/h; 14 mph) surfaced; 8 kn (15 km/h; 9.2 mph) submerged
- Range: 3,500 nmi (6,500 km; 4,000 mi) at 8 kn (15 km/h; 9.2 mph) on the surface; 25 nmi (46 km; 29 mi) at 8 kn (15 km/h; 9.2 mph) submerged
- Complement: 29
- Armament: 2 × 21 inch bow torpedo tubes; 2 × 17.7 inch bow torpedo tubes; 1 × 17.7 inch stern torpedo tube; 1 x 88 mm gun; 1 x 12.7 mm machine gun

The O 9-class submarine consisted of three submarines, built for the Royal Netherlands Navy. Used for patrols in the Dutch home waters. The class comprised O 9, O 10, and O 11. Its diving depth was 60 metres (200 ft).

== Design ==
The O 9-class submarines were designed by Johannes van der Struijf, at the time chief engineer of the Royal Netherlands Navy (RNN). Together with the submarines of the K XI class they were the first submarines designed fully in-house by the RNN, which resulted in the first indigenous Dutch submarine design. The submarines of the O 9-class were the first Dutch submarines built with two propellers and a double hull. Previous classes only had a single hull and one propeller. As a result the submarines of the O 9-class had a different external shape in comparison to previous Dutch submarine classes as they were no longer cigar shaped. The submarines had a length of 54.66 meters, a beam of 5.70 meters and a draught of 3.53 meters. Furthermore, each submarine had a displacement of 526 ton while surfaced and 656 ton underwater. The diving depth of the O 9 class was 60 meters.

The primary armament of the O 9-class submarines consisted of five torpedo tubes; two 53.3 cm torpedo tubes and three 45 cm torpedo tubes. The 45 cm torpedo tubes were unusual since most contemporary submarines in service with foreign navies at the time did not use 45 cm torpedo tubes anymore. In addition to the torpedo tubes, each submarine had a single 8.8 cm cannon and a machine gun, which could be used against planes. There was also enough room in the submarine to store 10 torpedoes.

The O 9-class submarines were equipped with two 6 cylinder two-stroke diesel engines made by the company Sulzer in Winterthur. Besides the diesel engines, it also had two electric motors and a 120 cells battery. This gave a capacity of 4350 Ah and allowed the submarine to operate solely on electric power for 3 hours. The engines allowed the submarines to reach 900 hp when surfaced and 500 hp underwater, which resulted in a maximum speed while surfaced of 12 kn and underwater 8 knots.

== Service history ==
In the morning of 6 March 1940 the submarines of the O 9-class were planning to do exercises near Texel that would be filmed for propaganda purposes. However, while leaving the harbor of Den Helder the O 11 got rammed by the surveillance vessel BV 3 and as a result of severe damage sunk.

At the time of the German invasion O 11 was under repair in Den Helder. On 14 May 1940 she was scuttled there to prevent her being captured by German forces. However the Germans raised the ship and ordered it repaired. In September 1944 O 11 was sunk in Den Helder to block the entrance of the harbour.

== Ships in class ==
The ships were built by three different shipyards. O 9 was built by the Koninklijke Maatschappij De Schelde in Flushing, O 10 in Amsterdam at the Nederlandsche Scheepsbouw Maatschappij and O 11 in Rotterdam at Fijenoord shipyard.

O 9-class construction data
Name	Laid down	Launched	Commissioned	Decommissioned
O 9	23 September 1922	7 April 1925	18 January 1926	1 December 1944
O 10	24 December 1923	30 July 1925	1 September 1926	11 October 1944
O 11	24 December 1922	19 March 1925	18 January 1926	Dutch Navy: 14 May 1940 (scuttled); German navy: September 1944 (sunk)
