= HNLMS O 10 =

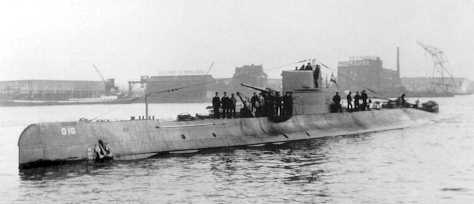
- O 10

History

Netherlands
- Name: O 10
- Builder: Nederlandsche Scheepsbouw Maatschappij, Amsterdam
- Yard number: 169
- Laid down: 24 December 1923
- Launched: 30 July 1925
- Commissioned: 1 September 1926
- Decommissioned: 11 October 1944
- Fate: Sold for scrap October 1946

General characteristics
- Class & type: O 9-class submarine
- Displacement: 526 tons surfaced; 656 tons submerged
- Length: 54.66 m (179 ft 4 in)
- Beam: 5.7 m (18 ft 8 in)
- Draught: 3.53 m (11 ft 7 in)
- Propulsion: 2 × 450 bhp (336 kW) diesel engines; 2 × 250 bhp (186 kW) electric motors
- Speed: 12 kn (22 km/h; 14 mph) surfaced; 8 kn (15 km/h; 9.2 mph) submerged
- Range: 3,500 nmi (6,500 km; 4,000 mi) at 8 kn (15 km/h; 9.2 mph) on the surface; 25 nmi (46 km; 29 mi) at 8 kn (15 km/h; 9.2 mph) submerged
- Complement: 29
- Armament: 2 × 21 in (530 mm) bow torpedo tubes; 2 × 17.7 in (450 mm) bow torpedo tubes; 1 × 17.7 in (450 mm) stern torpedo tube; 1 x 88 mm (3.5 in) gun; 1 x 12.7 mm (0.50 in) machine gun

O 10 was a O 9-class patrol submarine of the Royal Netherlands Navy. The ship was built by Nederlandsche Scheepsbouw Maatschappij shipyard in Amsterdam.

== Service history ==
The submarine was ordered on 9 August 1921 and laid down in Amsterdam at the shipyard of Nederlandsche Scheepsbouw Maatschappij on 24 December 1923. The launch took place on 30 July 1925. On 1 September 1926 the ship was commissioned in the Dutch navy.

In 1927 O 10, O 11, Hertog Hendrik, Z 5, Z 6, Z 7 and Z 8 made a visit to Norway.

In 1928, O 10, Hertog Hendrik, Z 5, Z 6 and Z 7 made a trip to the North Sea and visited Edinburgh. In 1929, O 10, O 9, Jacob van Heemskerck, Z 5, Z 6, made a trip to the Baltic Sea for exercises. The next year, on 30 July 1930, O 9, O 10, Jacob van Heemskerck and Witte de With visited Antwerp.

In 1931, O 10, O 9, O 8, Jacob van Heemskerck, Z 7, Z 8, made again a trip to the Baltic Sea for exercises. She sailed for the Baltics again in 1936 with her sisters O 9, O 11, Hertog Hendrik and Z 5. In 1939, O 10 together with her sisters O 9 and O 11 were attached to the coastal division. They acted as the offensive part of Dutch coastal defense. That same year, in 1939, the O 10 collided with the Sumatra and was severely damaged.

From 9 to 11 May 1940, she and O 9 were on patrol off the coast of the Netherlands. During the patrol, O 9 was attacked by German military airplanes. On 12 May 1940, she, O 9 and a tugboat fled to the United Kingdom where they arrived on 15 May 1940.

During the war she patrolled the English Channel, Atlantic Ocean and the Bay of Biscay. From July to August 1940, O 10 was attached to the 7th Training Flotilla in Rothesay and used as an ASDIC piggy boat. She was transferred to the 9th Flotilla in Dundee where she served from 30 August 1940 to July 1944.

On 11 October 1944, O 10 was decommissioned and in September 1946, stricken. She was sold for scrapping in October 1946.

== Bibliography ==
- Jalhay, P.C. (1982). Nederlandse Onderzeedienst 75 jaar (in Dutch). Bussum: De Boer Maritiem. ISBN 90-228-1864-0.
- von Münching, L.L. (1978). Schepen van de Koninklijke Marine in de Tweede Wereldoorlog (in Dutch). Alkmaar: De Alk. ISBN 90-6013-903-8.
