= Johannes van der Struijf =

Dutch naval engineer (1865–1933)

- Born: 3 October 1865; Hof van Delft, Netherlands
- Died: 29 December 1933 (aged 68); The Hague, Netherlands
- Occupation: Naval engineer

Johannes van der Struijf (Note: His name is sometimes also written as J. van der Struyf, J. van der Struyff, J.J. van der Struyff or J.J. van der Struijf.) (3 October 1865 – 29 December 1933) was a Dutch naval engineer who served as chief engineer of the Royal Netherlands Navy (RNLN). He is best known for being responsible for the first indigenous Dutch submarine designs of the RNLN. Between 1921 until his retirement on 1 January 1931 he designed a total of 15 Dutch submarines, of which seven were O type boats and eight were K type boats.

== Early life ==
Johannes van der Struijf was born on 3 October 1865 in Hof van Delft, Netherlands.

== History ==
In August 1914 Van der Struijf was promoted to chief engineer of the Royal Netherlands Navy.

Starting with the O 9 class submarine and K XI class submarine Van der Struijf was responsible for the design of 15 Dutch submarines between 1921 and 1931. His submarine designs showed successive improvements and incorporated several changes compared to the earlier foreign designed submarines of the Royal Netherlands Navy. However, some of his submarine designs did show a few aspects that were clearly inspired by German submarine designs.

In June 1932 he was appointed officer in the Order of Orange-Nassau.

== Personal life ==
He died on 29 December 1933 at the age of 68 at the Bronovo hospital in the Hague. He was buried on 1 January 1934 at Nieuw Eykenduynen.

== Notes ==
=== Bibliography ===
- Anten, J. (2011). Navalisme nekt onderzeeboot : de invoer van buitenlandse zeestrategieën op de Nederlandse zeestrategie voor de defensie van Nederlands-Indië, 1912-1942 (Thesis) (in Dutch). Pallas Publications, Amsterdam University Press. ISBN 978-90-5260-378-0.
- Bosscher, Ph.M.; Bussemaker, H.O. (2007). Gelouterd door strijd: De Nederlandse Onderzeedienst tot de val van Java, 1942 (in Dutch). Amsterdam: De Bataafsche Leeuw. ISBN 978-90-6707-614-2.
- D.H. (1934). "In Memoriam: J. van der Struijf". Marineblad (in Dutch). Vol. 49. Den Helder: Orgaan der Marine-vereeniging. pp. 10–12.
- Jalhay, P.C. (1982). Nederlandse Onderzeedienst 75 jaar (in Dutch). Bussum: De Boer Maritiem. ISBN 90-228-1864-0.
- Noppen, Ryan K. (2020). The Royal Netherlands Navy of World War II. New Vanguard. Oxford: Osprey Publishing. ISBN 9781472841926.
