= HNLMS Marten Harpertszoon Tromp =

Coast defense ship of the Royal Netherlands Navy

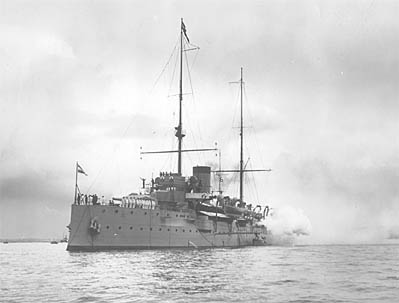

History

Netherlands
- Name: Marten Harpertszoon Tromp
- Namesake: Maarten Tromp
- Builder: Rijkswerf, Amsterdam
- Laid down: 1903
- Launched: 15 June 1904
- Commissioned: 5 April 1906
- Decommissioned: 1927
- Fate: Scrapped

General characteristics
- Class & type: Unique coastal defence ship
- Displacement: 5,210 tons
- Length: 100.78 m (330 ft 8 in)
- Beam: 15.19 m (49 ft 10 in)
- Draught: 5.69 m (18 ft 8 in)
- Propulsion: 6,400 hp (4,800 kW), two shafts
- Speed: 16.5 knots (30.6 km/h)
- Complement: 340
- Armament: 2 × 9.4 in (24 cm) (2 × 1); 4 × 15 cm (5.9 in) (4 × 1); 8 × 7.5 cm (3.0 in) (8 × 1); 4 × 1pdr (4 × 1); 3 × 45 cm (18 in) torpedo tubes
- Armour: 6 in (15 cm) belt; 8 in (20 cm) barbette; 8 in (20 cm) turret

HNLMS Marten Harpertszoon Tromp (Dutch: Hr.Ms. Marten Harpertszoon Tromp) was a unique coastal defence ship (Note: In the Dutch navy the ship was classified as "pantserschip" literally translated: armored ship.) of the Royal Netherlands Navy built by the Rijkswerf in Amsterdam.

== Design ==
The ship was 100.78 m (330.6 ft) long, had a beam of 15.19 m (49.8 ft), a draught of 5.69 m (18.7 ft), and had a displacement of 5,210 ton. The ship was equipped with 2 shaft reciprocating engines, which were rated at 6,400 ihp (4,800 kW) and produced a top speed of 16.5 knots (30.6 km/h).

The ship had a belt armour of 15 cm (6 in), 20 cm (8 in) barbette armour and turret armour.

The main armament of the ships were two 24 cm (9.4 in) single turret guns. Secondary armament included four single 15 cm (5.9 in) guns and eight 7.5 cm (3.0 in) single guns.

== Service history ==
Tromp was launched on 15 June 1904 at the Rijkswerf in Amsterdam. On 5 April 1906 she was commissioned by Captain Koster as the first commander of the ship. The same year on 25 June she made a visit to Norway for an official visit to the ship by Haakon VII of Norway.

10 August 1909 Tromp together with Koningin Regentes and De Ruyter departed from Batavia to China, Hong Kong, Japan and the Philippines to show the flag.

On 2 March 1920 she and Hertog Hendrik departed from Den Helder for a four month journey to Asia to show the flag. They visited the ports of Singapore, Saigon, Hong Kong, Shanghai, Kobe and Manila.

On 17 November 1923, the Dutch cargo ship SS Rijperkerk put into port at Bastia, Corsica, France, on fire. Marten Harpertszoon Tromp scuttled the burning ship.

From 21 June to 30 July 1926 the ship together with Jacob van Heemskerck, torpedo boats Z 7 and Z 8 and submarines O 9 and O 11 departed from Den Helder to the Baltic. During the trip they visited the ports of Kiel, Gothenburg and Trondheim.

The ship was decommissioned in 1927.
