= Torpedo Service =

Former branch of the Royal Netherlands Navy

Royal Netherlands Navy Torpedo Service
- Marine Torpedodienst
- Founded: 16 May 1875; 150 years ago
- Country: Netherlands
- Branch: Royal Netherlands Navy
- Part of: Ministry of Defence

The Royal Netherlands Navy Torpedo Service (Dutch: Marine Torpedodienst) was a department within the Royal Netherlands Navy that was responsible for dealing with torpedoes and (until 1907, when the Mine Service split off from it) mines. It was established on 16 May 1875 and had at its peak 1,000 personnel. This dropped to 500 after the Second World War and in 1978, when the last mechanical torpedo (the Mark 8) in use by the Dutch Navy was phased out and replaced by electric torpedoes, the Service was disestablished.

== History ==
The Royal Netherlands Navy Torpedo Service was founded on 16 May 1875, with workshops being established at Den Helder, Amsterdam and Hellevoetsluis. Initially the torpedo service was mainly focused on spar torpedoes. It was involved in the construction and maintenance of spar torpedo boats, while the service also helped with equipping other Dutch naval ships with these kind of torpedoes. However, as a result of the increasing developments of countermeasures against spar torpedoes, the torpedo service started shifting its focus from 1885 on wards towards the self-propelled torpedo.

Around 1907 the torpedo service was also tasked with disabling fished, drifted and swept up mines.
