= Mine Service =

Royal Netherlands Navy Mine Service
- Mijnendienst
- Founded: 1907; 119 years ago
- Country: Netherlands
- Branch: Royal Netherlands Navy
- Part of: Ministry of Defence
- Engagements: World War II

The Royal Netherlands Navy Mine Service (Dutch: Mijnendienst) is a department within the Royal Netherlands Navy that is responsible for keeping Dutch coastal waterways and approaches to major seaport areas mine-free. It was established out of the Royal Netherlands Navy Torpedo Service in 1907.

== History ==
The Royal Netherlands Navy Mine Service was established in 1907 when the first Dutch naval mine, Type 1907, was taken into service. The decision to introduce the naval mine was made a year earlier in 1906 and was likely influenced by the important role that mines had played during the Russo-Japanese War in 1904. The first minelayers and minesweepers that were used by the mine service consisted of ships that had been modified to be able to lay or sweep mines.

=== World War I ===
During the First World War the minelayers of the mine service laid several defensive minefields to defend the neutrality of the Netherlands. The idea behind the minefields was that it would make it harder for foreign naval ships to enter Dutch territorial waters. Besides laying minefields the ships and personnel of the mine service were also involved in disabling drifting and stranded mines. The important role of the mine service during this period led to an increase of new material. As a result the mine service had at the end of the First World War 17 minelayers in service.

=== Cold War ===
During the Iran–Iraq War two Alkmaar class minehunters, Hellevoetsluit and Maassluis, took part in a Western European Union mine counter measure mission in the Persian Gulf.

== Notes ==
=== Bibliography ===
- Quant, L.J. (1919). Het Huidige Marinevraagstuk (in Dutch). Haarlem: H.D. Tjeenk Willink & Zoon.
- Woudstra, F.G.A. (1982). Onze Koninklijke Marine (in Dutch). Alkmaar: De Alk. ISBN 90-6013-915-1.
- Raven, G.J.A., ed. (1988). De kroon op het anker: 175 jaar Koninklijke Marine (in Dutch). Amsterdam: De Bataafsche Leeuw. ISBN 90-6707-200-1.
- Roetering, B., ed. (1997). Mijnendienst 1907-1997 90 jaar: feiten, verhalen en anekdotes uit het negentigjarig bestaan van de Mijnendienst van de Koninklijke Marine (in Dutch). ISBN 90-90-10528-X.
