= HNLMS O 1 =

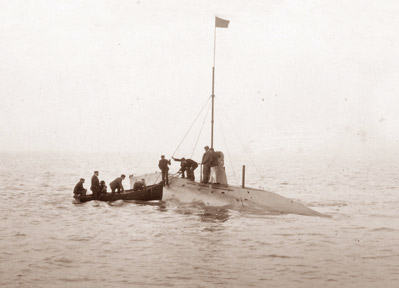
- O 1

History

Netherlands
- Name: O 1
- Builder: De Schelde, Flushing
- Cost: ƒ430.000
- Yard number: 116
- Laid down: 1 June 1904
- Launched: 8 July 1905
- Commissioned: 21 December 1906
- Decommissioned: 1920
- Fate: Scrapped 1920

General characteristics
- Class & type: Unique submarine
- Displacement: 105 tons – 124 tons
- Length: 20.42 m (67 ft 0 in)
- Beam: 4.08 m (13 ft 5 in)
- Draught: 2.79 m (9 ft 2 in)
- Propulsion: 1 × 160 bhp (119 kW) diesel engine; 1 × 65 bhp (48 kW) electric motor
- Speed: 8.5 kn (15.7 km/h; 9.8 mph) surfaced; 8 kn (15 km/h; 9.2 mph) submerged
- Range: 200 nmi (370 km; 230 mi) at 8 kn (15 km/h; 9.2 mph) on the surface; 24 nmi (44 km; 28 mi) at 6 kn (11 km/h; 6.9 mph) submerged
- Complement: 10
- Armament: 1 × 18 inch bow torpedo tube

O 1 was a Holland 7P patrol submarine of the Royal Netherlands Navy. The ship was built by the De Schelde shipyard in Flushing and was the first submarine in the Dutch navy. It had a diving depth of 25 metres.

== Service history ==
The Royal Netherlands Navy purchased the submarine O 1 mainly to gain experience in the use of the underwater weapons. The submarine was laid down in Flushing at the shipyard of De Schelde under the name of Luctor et Emergo on 1 June 1904, as it was not yet certain the Dutch navy would purchase the ship. The design came from the American company Holland Torpedo Boat Company The engineer Marly Hai was sent to the shipyard to assist in the construction of the submarine. The launch took place on 8 July 1905.

A series of trials and tests were held that were overseen by committee appointed by the Ministry of Defence. The committee was not satisfied after the first series of tests but after the second series of tests the ship was purchased by the navy for 430,000 Dutch guilders.

On 21 December 1906 the ship was commissioned in the navy as Onderzeese boot 1 (Submarine 1); it is uncertain at which point the ship was renamed to O 1.

Since the O1 quickly proved its value during various exercises and one boat was not sufficient to base new tactics and strategies on, the Royal Netherlands Navy ordered five new submarines, which were put into service in the period 1911–1914: the O2 to O5 and the KI. The last boat was specially designed for the service in the Dutch East Indies.

In 1907 Queen Wilhelmina of the Netherlands watched the submarine as it made a dive. On 27 March 1908 Prince Henry made a visit to the O 1 while moored in Nieuwediep in Den Helder.

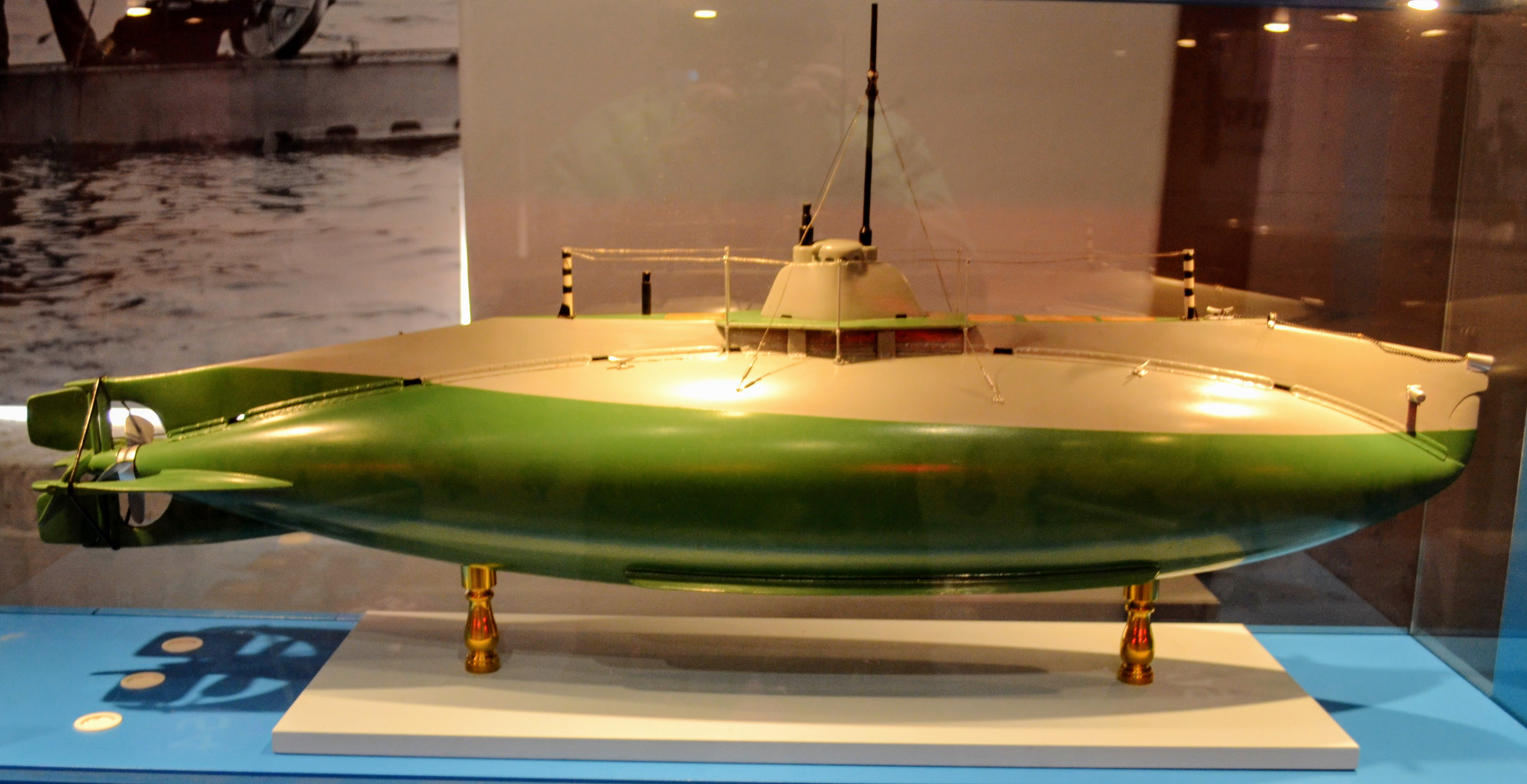
Model of HNLMS O 1 in the Nederlands Scheepvaartmuseum

The O 1 was present in Amsterdam in September 1910 when the Belgian King and Queen visited the city. In 1914 the 160 pk OTTO petrol engine was replaced by a 200 pk M.A.N. diesel engine. In 1920 the O 1 was decommissioned and eventually scrapped.

== See also ==
- Damen Schelde Naval Shipbuilding
- Ships of the Royal Netherlands Navy
- Royal Netherlands Navy
- List of submarines of the Netherlands
