= HMS H6 =

H-class submarine operated by the Royal Navy,

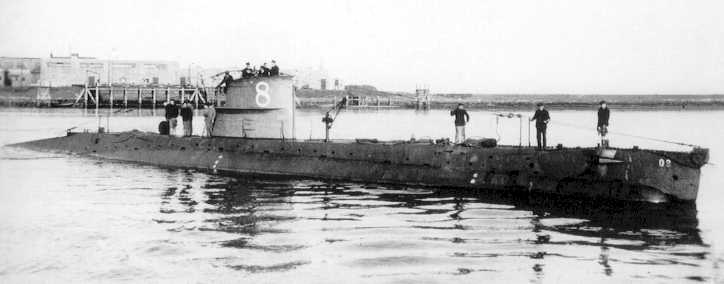
- HNLMS O 8

History

United Kingdom
- Name: HMS H6
- Builder: Canadian Vickers, Montreal
- Laid down: 1914
- Launched: 12 May 1915
- Commissioned: 10 June 1915
- Fate: Sold to the Netherlands on 4 May 1917

Netherlands
- Name: HNLMS O 8
- Acquired: 4 May 1917
- Commissioned: 7 May 1917
- Fate: Scuttled by Dutch forces following German invasion of the Netherlands during Second World War. Later refloated by Germany on 14 May 1940

Nazi Germany
- Name: UD-1
- Commissioned: 21 November 1940
- Decommissioned: 23 November 1943
- Fate: Scuttled in Kiel Harbour following Allied advance on 3 May 1945

General characteristics (as built)
- Class & type: H-class submarine
- Displacement: 364 long tons (370 t) surfaced; 434 long tons (441 t) submerged
- Length: 150 ft 3 in (45.80 m)
- Beam: 15 ft 4 in (4.67 m)
- Propulsion: 1 × 480 hp (358 kW) diesel engine; 2 × 620 hp (462 kW) electric motors
- Speed: 13 knots (24 km/h; 15 mph) surfaced; 10 knots (19 km/h; 12 mph) submerged
- Range: 1,600 nautical miles (3,000 km; 1,800 mi) at 10 knots (19 km/h; 12 mph) surfaced; 130 nautical miles (240 km; 150 mi) at 2 knots (3.7 km/h; 2.3 mph) submerged
- Complement: 22
- Armament: 4 × 18-inch (450mm) bow torpedo tubes; 6 × 18 inch torpedoes

Service record as UD-1
- Part of: 1st U-boat Flotilla; November 1940 – April 1941; 3rd U-boat Flotilla; May – August 1941; 5th U-boat Flotilla; August – December 1941; U-boat Defense School; December 1941 – July 1943; 5th U-boat Flotilla; July – November 1943
- Identification codes: M 28 540
- Commanders: K.Kapt. Hermann Rigele; 21 November 1940 – 3 May 1941; Kptlt. Friedrich Schäfer; 4 May – 2 November 1941; Franz Venier; 3 November 1941 – 14 December 1942; Kptlt. Wolfgang Ketelsen; 15 December 1942 – 17 May 1943; Oblt.z.S. Friedrich Weidner; 18 May – 28 November 1943
- Operations: None
- Victories: None

HMS H6 was a British H-class submarine of the Royal Navy built by Canadian Vickers & Co. during World War I.

== Design ==
She had a displacement of 364 long tons (370 t) at the surface and 434 long tons (441 t) while submerged. Her total length was 150 feet 3 inches (45.8 m), with a beam of 15 feet 4 inches (4.7 m) and a draught of 12 feet (3.7 m).

Her two diesel engines provided a total power of 480 horsepower (360 kW) and her two electric motors provided 320 horsepower (240 kW) power which gave the submarine a maximum surface speed of 13 knots (24 km/h; 15 mph) and a submerged speed of 11 knots (20 km/h; 13 mph). She would normally carry 16.4 long tons (16.7 t) of fuel and had a maximum capacity of 18 long tons (18 t) and a range of 1,600 nautical miles (2,963 km; 1,841 mi). The boat was armed with a 6-pounder (2.7 kg) Hotchkiss quick-firing gun and four 18-inch (457 mm) bow torpedo tubes with six 18-inch (457 mm) torpedoes carried. The complement was twenty-two crew members.

== History ==
She was completed on 10 June 1915 and was commissioned by the Royal Navy the same year. However, her service in the Royal Navy was short. On 19 January 1916, she ran aground near the Dutch island of Schiermonnikoog, after which she was interned by the Royal Netherlands Navy. On 4 May 1917, an agreement was reached to sell H6 to the Netherlands.

=== Dutch service ===
The Royal Netherlands Navy renamed H6 to HNLMS O 8 and refitted her, with knowledge gained from the interned German submarine UC-8. After UC-8 was bought from Germany O 8 was equipped with UC-8's Zeiss periscope. During maintenance in October 1921, O 8 partly sank in the harbour at Den Helder. Because only minor damage was sustained, she was repaired and continued in service. In the summer of 1925, O 8 together with the other Dutch vessels HNLMS K XI, HNLMS Jacob van Heemskerck, HNLMS Marten Harpertszoon Tromp, HNLMS Z 3 and HNLMS Z 5 were part of an exercise in the Baltic Sea.

During the German attack on the Netherlands at the start of the Second World War, O 8 was still in Dutch service. At the time she was undergoing maintenance and as a result could not escape during the invasion. Instead it was decided to scuttle her.

=== German service ===
After the surrender of the Netherlands, the German forces were able raise O 8 and found her almost fully intact.

Germany took O 8 into service as UD-1 and transferred her from Den Helder to Kiel. In Kiel, she was used as training ship to train crews for the German U-boats. Because of her age, she was decommissioned on 23 November 1943. On 3 May 1945, she was scuttled again in the harbour at Kiel.

== Bibliography ==
- Busch, Rainer; Röll, Hans-Joachim (1999). German U-boat commanders of World War II : a biographical dictionary. Translated by Brooks, Geoffrey. London, Annapolis, Md: Greenhill Books, Naval Institute Press. ISBN 1-55750-186-6.
- Busch, Rainer; Röll, Hans-Joachim (1999). Deutsche U-Boot-Verluste von September 1939 bis Mai 1945 [German U-boat losses from September 1939 to May 1945]. Der U-Boot-Krieg (in German). Vol. IV. Hamburg, Berlin, Bonn: Mittler. ISBN 3-8132-0514-2.
- Gardiner, Robert (1985). Conway's All the World's Fighting Ships 1906–1921. Conway Maritime Press. ISBN 0-85177-245-5.
- Gröner, Erich; Jung, Dieter; Maass, Martin (1991). German Warships 1815–1945, U-boats and Mine Warfare Vessels. Vol. 2. Translated by Thomas, Keith; Magowan, Rachel. London: Conway Maritime Press. ISBN 0-85177-593-4.
- Jalhay, P.C.; Wijn, J.J.A. (1997). Ik nader ongezien! De onderzeeboten van de Koninklijke Marine. Amsterdam: De Bataafsche Leeuw. ISBN 9067074624.
- von Münching, L.L. (1978). Schepen van de Koninklijke Marine in de Tweede Wereldoorlog (in Dutch). Alkmaar: De Alk. ISBN 90-6013-903-8.
- de Bles, Harry; Boven, Graddy; Homburg, Leon (2006). Onderzeeboten! (in Dutch). Zaltbommel: Aprilis. ISBN 978-90-5994-130-4.
- Jalhay, P.C. (1982). Nederlandse Onderzeedienst 75 jaar (in Dutch). Bussum: De Boer Maritiem. ISBN 90-228-1864-0.
