= HNLMS Jacob van Heemskerck (1906) =

Coast defense ship of the Royal Netherlands Navy

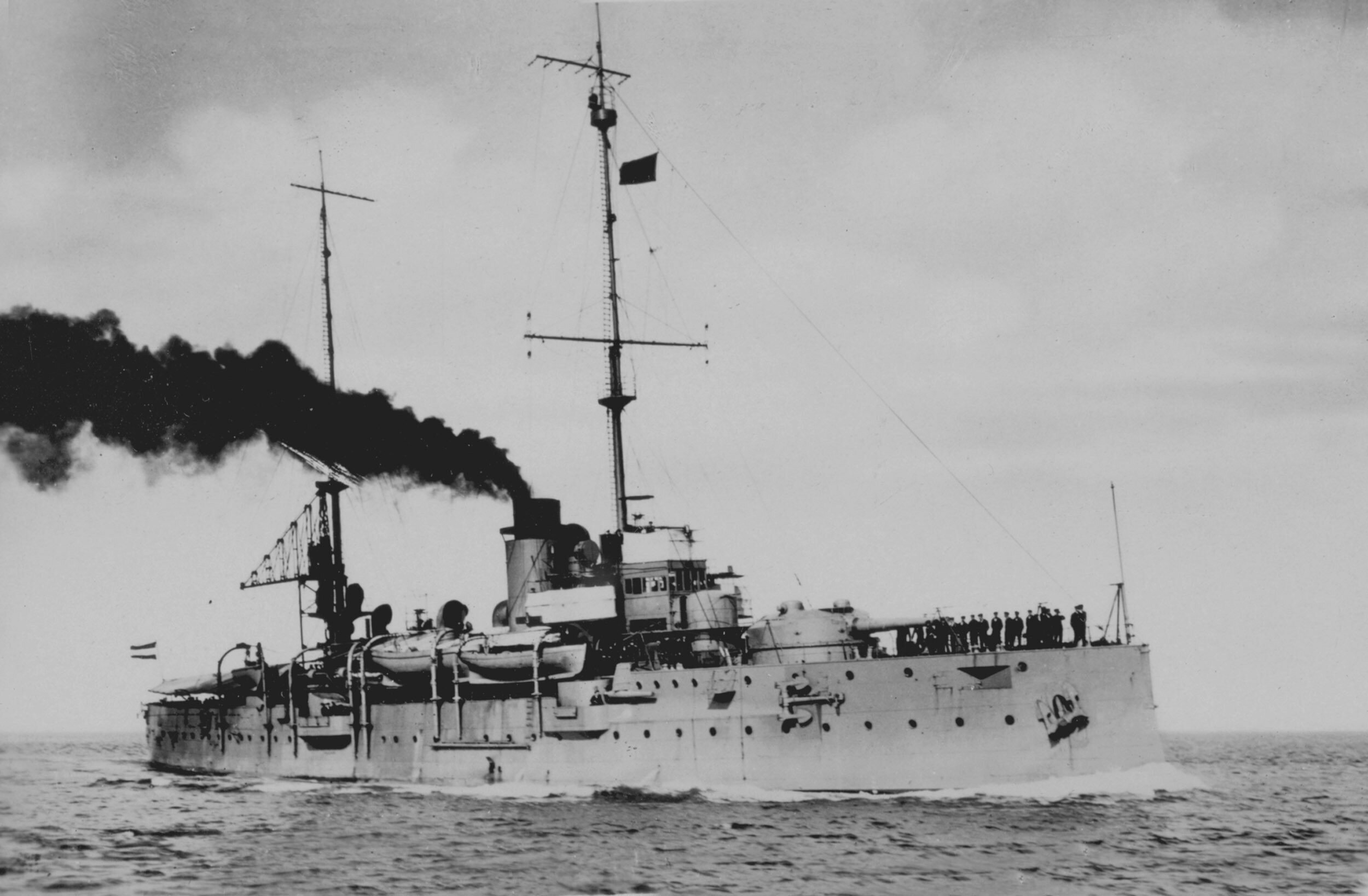
- Jacob van Heemskerck

History

Netherlands
- Name: Jacob van Heemskerck
- Namesake: Jacob van Heemskerck
- Builder: Rijkswerf, Amsterdam
- Laid down: 1905
- Launched: 22 September 1906
- Commissioned: 22 April 1908
- Recommissioned: 23 February 1948
- Decommissioned: 13 September 1974
- Renamed: Batterijschip IJmuiden (1939); Neptunus (1948)
- Reclassified: Floating battery ship, 1939; Accommodation ship, 1948
- Stricken: 4 October 1974
- Fate: Scrapped

Nazi Germany
- Name: Undine
- Namesake: Undine
- Acquired: 16 July 1940
- Commissioned: 1943
- Reclassified: Anti-aircraft battery, 1943
- Fate: Returned to the Netherlands postwar

General characteristics
- Type: Unique coastal defence ship
- Displacement: 4,920 tons
- Length: 98 m (321 ft 6 in)
- Beam: 15.19 m (49 ft 10 in)
- Draught: 5.69 m (18 ft 8 in)
- Installed power: 6,400 hp (4,800 kW)
- Propulsion: 2 shafts, reciprocating engines
- Speed: 16.5 knots (30.6 km/h)
- Complement: 340
- Sensors & processing systems: as Undine; FuMO 213
- Armament: as Jacob van Heemskerck; 2 × 9.4 in (24 cm) (2 × 1); 6 × 15 cm (5.9 in) (6 × 1); 6 × 7.5 cm (3.0 in) (6 × 1); 4 × 1pdr (4 × 1); 2 × 45 cm (18 in) torpedo tubes; as Undine; 8 × 10.5 cm (4.1 in) (8 × 1); 5 × 4 cm (1.6 in) (2 × 2, 1 × 1); 4 × quad 2 cm (0.79 in)
- Armour: 6 in (15 cm) belt; 8 in (20 cm) barbette; 8 in (20 cm) turret

HNLMS Jacob van Heemskerck (Dutch: Hr.Ms. Jacob van Heemskerck) was a unique coastal defence ship (Note: In the Dutch navy the ship was classified as "pantserschip" literally translated: armored ship.) of the Royal Netherlands Navy built by the Rijkswerf in Amsterdam. She was among the ships send to patrol the Venezuelan coast during the Second Castro Crisis. After her active career she was rebuilt into a stationary battery ship and recommissioned. During World War II she was captured by the invading German forces and converted in an anti-aircraft battery. After the war the ship was recovered and given back to the Netherlands, to be converted to an accommodation ship.

== Design ==
The ship was 98 m (322 ft) long, had a beam of 15.19 m (49.8 ft), a draught of 5.69 m (18.7 ft), and had a displacement of 4,920 ton. The ship was equipped with 2 shaft reciprocating engines, which were rated at 6,400 ihp (4,800 kW) and produced a top speed of 16.5 knots (30.6 km/h). The ship had a belt armour of 6 in (15 cm), 8 in (20 cm) barbette armour and turret armour. Two 9.4 in (24 cm) single turret guns provided the ship's main armament, and these were augmented by six single 15 cm (5.9 in) guns and six 7.5 cm (3.0 in) single guns. The ship had a complement of 340 men.

== Service history ==
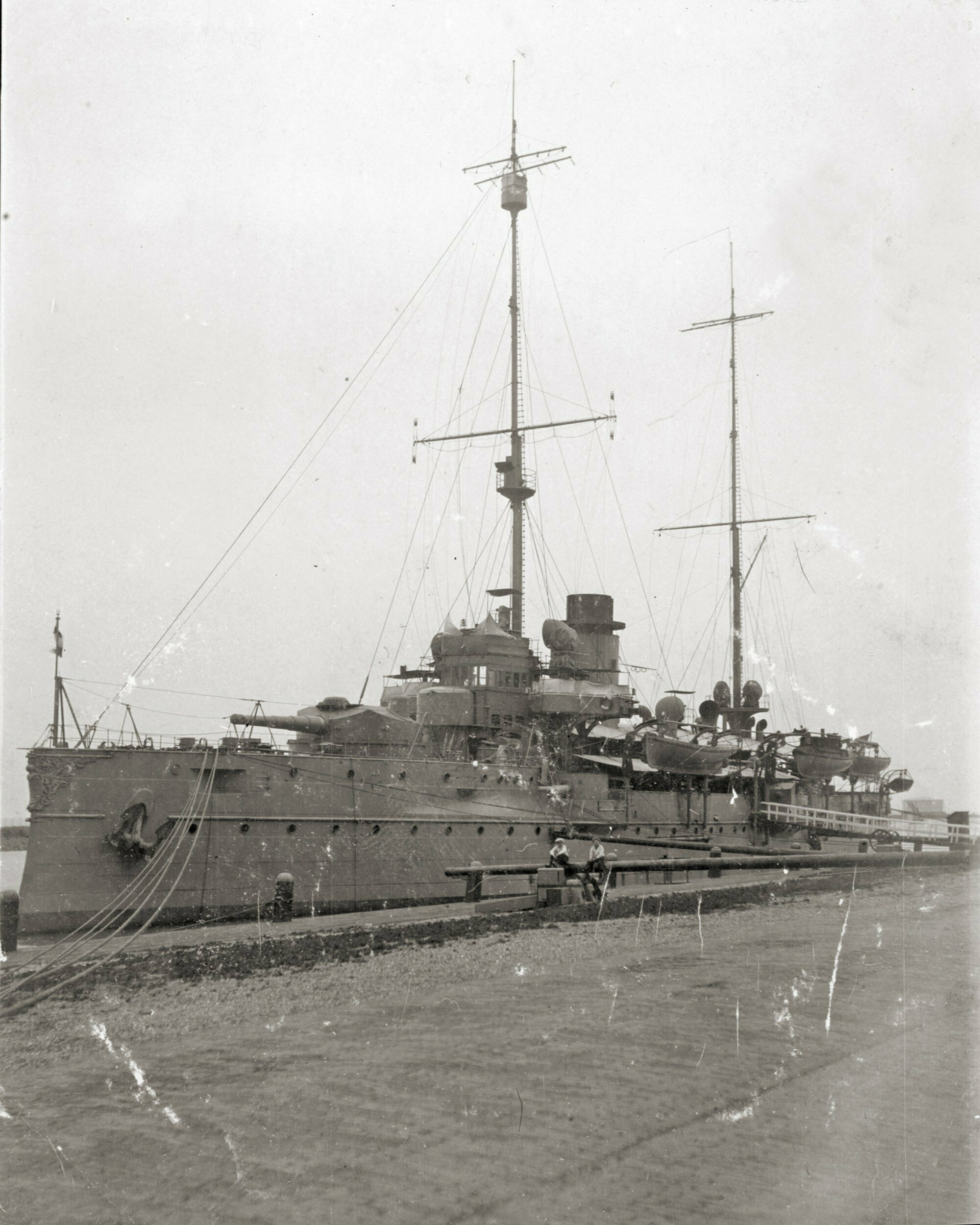
Jacob van Heemskerck in the 1920s.

The ship was built at the Rijkswerf in Amsterdam. Prince Henry of the Netherlands attended the launch ceremony and christened the ship on 22 September 1906. The ship was commissioned on 22 April 1908. The same year she, together with the Holland-class cruisers Friesland and Gelderland were sent to patrol the Venezuelan coast during the Second Castro Crisis.

On 16 May 1910 the ship left the port of IJmuiden to steam for Sheerness to bring Prince Henry of the Netherlands to the funeral of Edward VII of the United Kingdom of Great Britain and Ireland that was held on 20 May. During the last part of the journey the ship was escorted by five British torpedo boats. Later that year the Belgian king Albert I and his wife made a state visit to the Netherlands. During this visit, they visited the IJ in Amsterdam where Jacob van Heemskerck, Friesland, Piet Hein, Evertsen, O 1 and other Dutch warships were present and fired shots in salute. The pair were given a tour on the van Heemskerck.

On 24 July the ship left the port Den Helder for the coronation fleet review of King George V at Spithead on 27 June.

On 17 May 1917 the ship, together with the lugger Zorg en Vlijt picked up the crew of the luggers Mercurius and Jacoba that were boarded and later scuttled by a German submarine 50 nautical miles off the coast of IJmuiden.

=== World War II ===
After her active career she was rebuilt into a stationary battery ship and renamed Batterijschip IJmuiden and recommissioned on 19 April 1939. She was stationed in IJmuiden. During the German invasion in World War II on 14 May 1940 she was scuttled by her crew to prevent her being captured by the German forces.

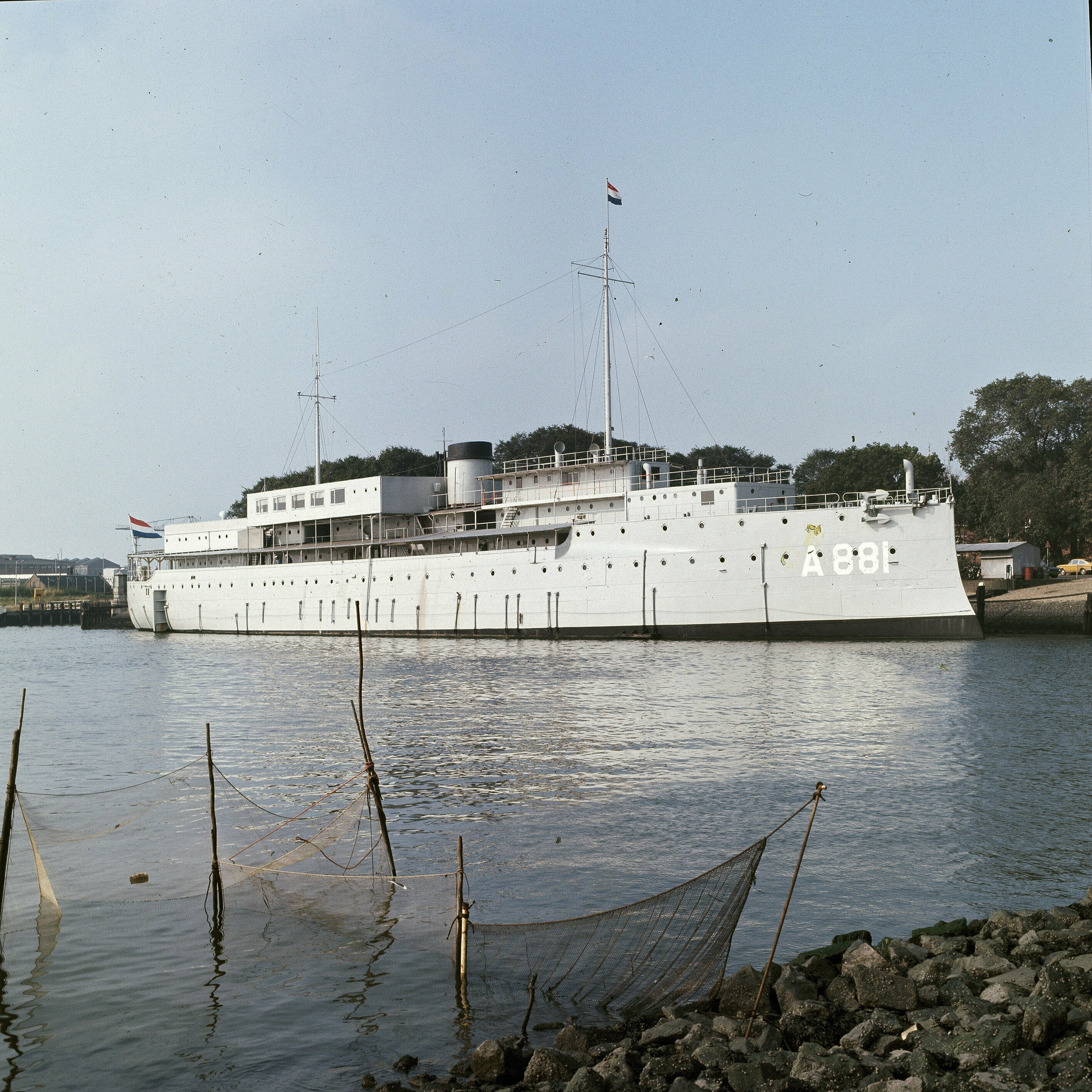
Accommodation ship Neptunus after the war.

The Germans however raised the ship on 16 July 1940 and towed her to Amsterdam on 24 July. From there she was towed to Kiel in March 1941. There she was rebuilt into a floating anti-aircraft battery at the Howaldtswerke and renamed Undine. After the war she was found back in Wilhelmshafen and returned to the Netherlands.

At the Rijkswerf in Amsterdam she was rebuilt into an accommodation ship. She was recommissioned on 23 February 1948 and renamed Neptunus. This role she fulfilled until her decommissioning on 13 September 1974. On 4 October that same year she was stricken.
