= HNLMS O 11 =

Dutch O 9-class patrol submarine

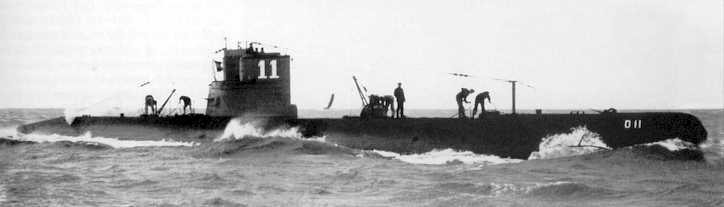
- O 11

History

Netherlands
- Name: O 11
- Builder: Fijenoord, Rotterdam
- Laid down: 24 December 1922
- Launched: 19 March 1925
- Commissioned: 18 January 1926
- Fate: Sunk, 6 March 1940

General characteristics
- Class & type: O 9-class submarine
- Displacement: 483 long tons (491 t) (surfaced); 647 long tons (657 t) (submerged)
- Length: 179 ft 6 in (54.7 m)
- Beam: 18 ft (5.5 m)
- Draft: 11 ft 6 in (3.5 m)}
- Propulsion: 2 × 450 bhp (336 kW) diesel engines; 2 × 305 bhp (227 kW) electric motors
- Speed: 12 knots (22 km/h; 14 mph) (surfaced); 8 kn (15 km/h; 9.2 mph) (submerged)
- Range: 3,500 nmi (6,500 km; 4,000 mi) at 11 knots (20 km/h; 13 mph) (surfaced); 11 nmi (20 km; 13 mi) at 8 kn (15 km/h; 9.2 mph) (submerged)
- Test depth: 200 ft (61 m)
- Complement: 29
- Armament: 2 × 21 in (530 mm) bow torpedo tubes; 2 × 17.7 in (450 mm) bow torpedo tubes; 1 × 17.7 in (450 mm) stern torpedo tubes; 1 x 88 mm (3.5 in) deck gun; 1 x 0.5 in (13 mm) machine gun

O 11 was a O 9-class patrol submarine built for the Royal Netherlands Navy during the 1920s for European service. Completed in 1926, the boat was sunk in a collision with a tugboat in early 1940. Refloated shortly afterwards, she was under repair when Germany invaded the Netherlands during the Second World War and scuttled by the Dutch. Her wreck was captured by the Germans and refloated, they made no use of her and she was scuttled as a blockship in 1944. Her wreck was scrapped in 1947.

== Design and description ==
The O 9-class submarines were smaller versions of the K XI class designed for home waters. The boats had a length of 179 feet 6 inches (54.7 m) overall, a beam of 18 feet (5.5 m) and a draft of 11 feet 6 inches (3.5 m). They displaced 483 long tons (491 t) on the surface and 645 long tons (655 t) submerged. The submarines had a crew of 29 officers and enlisted men.

For surface running, the boats were powered by two 450-brake-horsepower (336 kW) Sulzer diesel engines, each driving one propeller shaft. When submerged each propeller was driven by a 305-horsepower (227 kW) electric motor. They could reach 12 knots (22 km/h; 14 mph) on the surface and 8 knots (15 km/h; 9.2 mph) underwater. On the surface, the boats had a range of 3,500 nautical miles (6,500 km; 4,000 mi) at 13 knots (24 km/h; 15 mph) and 13 nmi (24 km; 15 mi) at 8 knots (15 km/h; 9.2 mph) submerged. The submarines had a diving depth of 200 feet (61 m).

The O 9 class was armed with a pair of 21-inch (530 mm) torpedo tubes in the bow and three 17.7-inch (450 mm) tubes. Two of these were in the bow and one in the stern. Each tube was provided with a reload torpedo. They were also armed with a 88-millimeter (3.5 in) deck gun and a 0.5-inch (12.7 mm) machine gun.

== Construction and career ==
O 11 was ordered on 30 August 1921 and laid down on 24 December 1922 at Fijenoord's shipyard in Rotterdam. The boat was launched on 19 March 1925 and commissioned on 18 January 1926.

On 6 March 1940, O 11 was accidentally rammed by the tugboat BV 3 in Den Helder. In the collision three men of O 11 died. The boat was refloated and repair began at the Den Helder Navy Yard. The repairs were not completed when Germany invaded the Netherlands on 10 May and the boat was scuttled to prevent her capture four days later. The Germans raised the boat, but nothing else with it. The boat was scuttled again in September 1944 in order to block the entrance of Den Helder harbor. O 11's wreck was refloated after the war and sold for scrap on 10 December 1947.

== Bibliography ==
- Bagnasco, Erminio (2018) [1977]. Submarines of World War Two: Design, Development and Operations. Naval Institute Press. ISBN 978-1-68247-384-9.
- Lenton, H.T. (1968). Royal Netherlands Navy. Navies of the Second World War. Macdonald & Co.
- Mark, Chris (1997). Schepen van de Koninklijke Marine in W.O. II (in Dutch). Alkmaar: De Alk. ISBN 90-6013-522-9.
- Noppen, Ryan K. (2020). The Royal Netherlands Navy of World War II. New Vanguard. Vol. 285. Osprey Publishing. ISBN 978-1-4728-4191-9.
- van Willigenburg, Henk (2010). Dutch Warships of World War II. Lanasta. ISBN 978-90-8616-318-2.
