= List of ship commissionings in 1931 =

The list of ship commissionings in 1931 includes a chronological list of all ships commissioned in 1931.

	Operator	Ship	Flag	Class and type	Pennant	Other notes
21 March	Royal Netherlands Navy	Van Nes		Admiralen-class destroyer	VN	
20 July	Royal Netherlands Navy	O 12		O 12-class submarine	O 12	
28 July	Royal Netherlands Navy	O 15		O 12-class submarine	O 15	
1 October	Royal Netherlands Navy	O 13		O 12-class submarine	O 13	
Uncertain	Argentine Navy	Almirante Brown		Veinticinco de Mayo-class cruiser	C-1	acquired from Italy
Uncertain	Argentine Navy	Veinticinco de Mayo		Veinticinco de Mayo-class cruiser	C-2	acquired from Italy
