= Veinticinco de Mayo =

Veinticinco de Mayo (Spanish: 25 May) may refer to:

- First National Government, creation of the Primera Junta in Argentina on 25 May 1810; an annual public holiday

== Places ==
=== Argentina ===
- Veinticinco de Mayo Partido, Buenos Aires Province
- Veinticinco de Mayo, Buenos Aires, a city in Buenos Aires Province
- Veinticinco de Mayo Department, Chaco, Chaco Province
- Veinticinco de Mayo (Misiones), a municipality in Misiones Province
- Veinticinco de Mayo Department, Misiones, Misiones Province
- Veinticinco de Mayo Department, Río Negro, Río Negro Province
- Veinticinco de Mayo, La Pampa, a town in La Pampa Province
- 25 de Mayo station, Mendoza Province

=== Uruguay ===
- Veinticinco de Mayo, Uruguay, a town in Florida Department

== Ships of the Argentine Navy ==
- ARA Veinticinco de Mayo, a set index of Argentine Navy ships, including:
  - ARA Veinticinco de Mayo (1890), a protected cruiser in service 1891–1921
  - ARA Veinticinco de Mayo (C-2), a cruiser in service 1931–1960
  - ARA Veinticinco de Mayo (V-2), an aircraft carrier in service 1969–1997
