= HNLMS O 14 =

Coordinates: 8°40′N 111°40′E

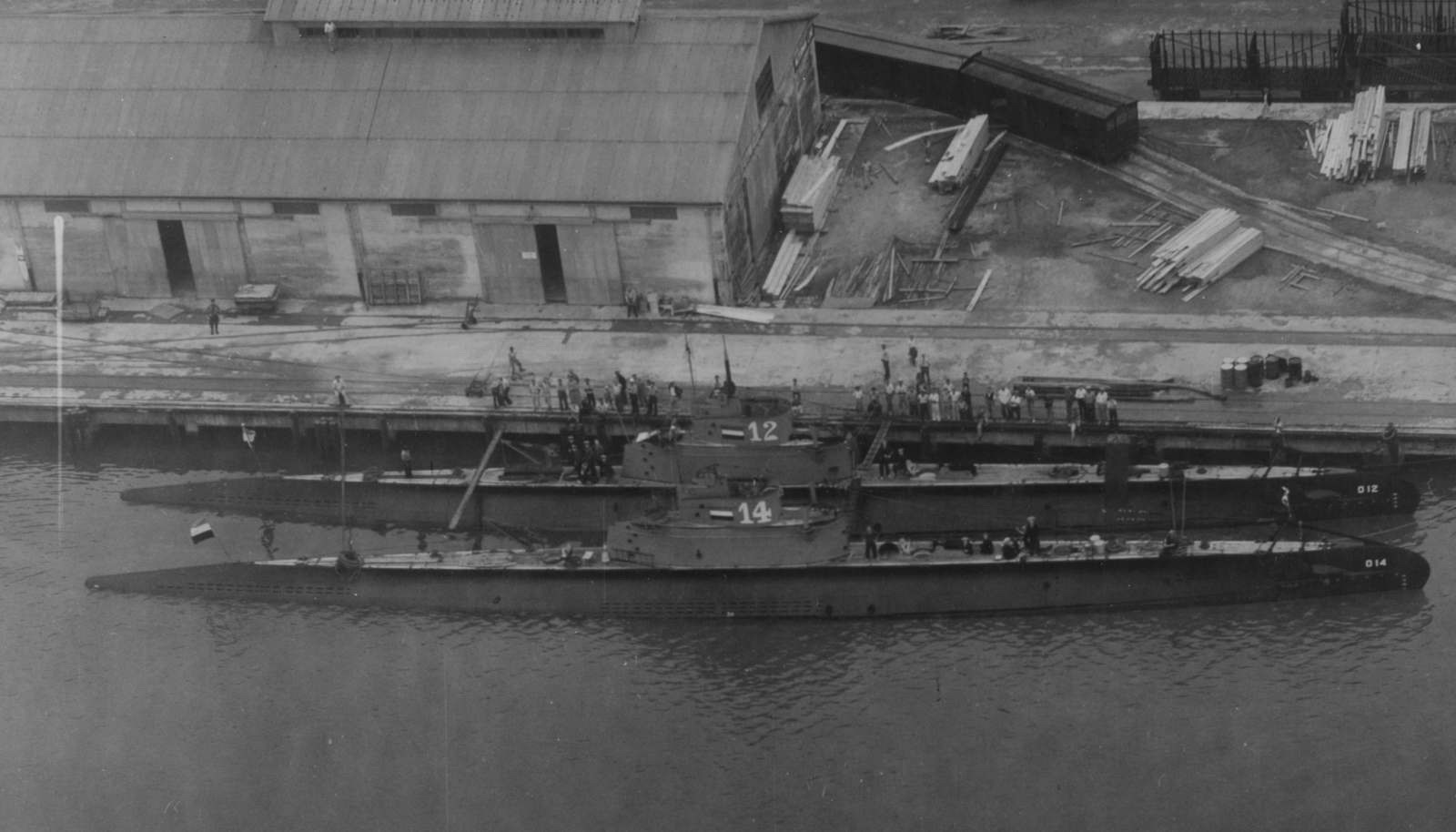
- HNLMS O 12 and O 14 in the harbor of San Juan, Puerto Rico (1937)

History

Netherlands
- Name: O 14
- Builder: Koninklijke Maatschappij De Schelde, Vlissingen
- Laid down: 29 December 1928
- Launched: 3 October 1931
- Commissioned: 4 March 1932
- Decommissioned: 26 June 1943

General characteristics
- Class & type: O 12-class submarine
- Displacement: 610 tons surfaced; 754 tons submerged
- Length: 60.4 m (198 ft 2 in)
- Beam: 6.8 m (22 ft 4 in)
- Draught: 3.6 m (11 ft 10 in)
- Propulsion: 2 × 900 bhp (671 kW) diesel engines; 2 × 310 bhp (231 kW) electric motors
- Speed: 16 kn (30 km/h; 18 mph) surfaced; 8 kn (15 km/h; 9.2 mph) submerged
- Range: 10,000 nmi (19,000 km; 12,000 mi) at 12 kn (22 km/h; 14 mph) on the surface; 28 nmi (52 km; 32 mi) at 8.5 kn (15.7 km/h; 9.8 mph) submerged
- Complement: 29-31
- Armament: 4 × 21 inch bow torpedo tubes; 1 × 21 inch stern torpedo tube; 2 × 44 mm guns; 1 × 12.7 mm machine gun

O 14 was a O 12-class submarine of the Royal Netherlands Navy that saw service during World War II. It was built by the Koninklijke Maatschappij De Schelde of Vlissingen and entered active duty on 4 March 1934.

Just before the start of World War II O 14 was in Curaçao. Because there was no need on the Allied side for a Dutch submarine to be stationed there, O 14 returned to Europe. Based in England, it did patrol duty off the coast of Norway, with convoy Convoy HX 79, and was decommissioned in 1943 due to a lack of replacement engines.

== Service history ==
=== Before World War II ===
Just after entering service O 14 received a visit from Duke Henry of Mecklenburg-Schwerin and Defence Minister on the occasion of the 25th anniversary of the Royal Netherlands Navy Submarine Service. In 1937, O 14 travelled to Curaçao with sister ship O 12, and again in 1939, this time with sister ship O 13.

=== During World War II ===
During the German invasion of the Netherlands in 1940, O 14 was stationed in Curaçao with sister ship O 15, where both were receiving maintenance.

Consultations between the Dutch and British Navy resulted in the decision to move O 14 and O 15 to Europe, since there was no need for Dutch submarines in the Caribbean. Both ships went via Kingston, Bermuda, and Halifax to England. O 14 underwent repairs at Halifax Shipyard on its armament. Since there was a lack of distilled water for the ship's batteries, O 14 could not join Convoy HX 78, but had to wait until October 1940, for Convoy HX 79. On 19 October a German wolfpack attacked the convoy, which sank 12 of the 45 ships and damaged another. O 14 was attacked as well, but all three torpedoes fired at the ship missed their target.

On 22 October 1940, O 14 arrived in Rothesay, Bute, and with O 9 and O 10 was used as a target ship during tests with the ASDIC sonar system. From 22 December 1940, O 14 was stationed in Dundee, where maintenance was done and the batteries replaced. Until August 1941 O 14 again served as the target ship for ASDIC tests in Scapa Flow.

From 8 August 1940, to January 1941, O 14 patrolled the coast of Norway without being able to attack any enemy ships. In January 1942 O 14 participated in Operation Kitbag, where it was placed 15 nautical miles (28 km; 17 mi) off the Norwegian coast and used as a radio beacon for destroyers on their way to the fjord at Hell, Norway. At the end of January and the start of February O 14 was involved with the unsuccessful search for the German battleship Tirpitz. Afterward O 14 was used as a target ship for anti-submarine warfare exercises in Scapa Flow, and then did three more patrols off the Norwegian coast, again without attacking enemy ships.

After those last patrols there was trouble with the diesel engines. Given the lack of parts, the severity of the problems, and the age of O 14 it was decided to decommission the sub. Parts were used in the repair of sister ship O 15. The Dutch crew was then stationed on a sub loaned from the British Navy, HMS Sturgeon, which was renamed Zeehond.
