= ARA Almirante Brown =

Several ships of the Argentine Republic Navy have been named Almirante Brown, General Brown, or Brown after William Brown (1777–1857), father of the Argentine Navy.

- ARA Almirante Brown (1826), a buccaneer sail ship
- ARA General Brown (1867), a steam ship later turned into a training vessel
- ARA General Brown (1869), a steam warship
- ARA Almirante Brown (1880), an ironclad warship launched by Samuda Brothers of London in 1880 and stricken in 1932
- ARA Almirante Brown (C-1), a Veinticinco de Mayo-class heavy cruiser, launched in 1929, commissioned into the Argentine Navy in 1931, and decommissioned in 1961
- ARA Brown (D-20), a Fletcher-class destroyer, the former USS Heermann, commissioned into the Argentine Navy in 1961, and scrapped in 1982
- ARA Almirante Brown (D-10), an Almirante Brown-class destroyer, launched in 1981
