= HNLMS Mico =

World War II Dutch patrol ship

History

Netherlands
- Name: Mico
- Builder: L. Smit & Zoon, Kinderdijk
- Laid down: 1939
- Launched: 1939
- Commissioned: 1941 Royal Netherlands Navy
- Out of service: 1946 Royal Netherlands Navy
- Fate: Returned to owner in 1946

General characteristics
- Type: Patrol boat, auxiliary minesweeper
- Displacement: 118 t (116 long tons) standard
- Length: 24.25 m (79 ft 7 in)
- Beam: 5.70 m (18 ft 8 in)
- Draught: 3.30 m (10 ft 10 in)
- Installed power: 350 hp (260 kW)
- Propulsion: 1 × Diesel Engine
- Speed: 10 knots (19 km/h; 12 mph)
- Complement: 15
- Armament: 2 × machine guns

HNLMS Mico was originally a tugboat constructed for use in the Dutch Caribbean. The ship was completed in 1939 and was requisitioned and militarized by the Royal Netherlands Navy in 1941.

== Service history ==
The tugboat Mico was at Curaçao when the Second World War broke out. Initially the waters in the Dutch Caribbean were defended by a combination of Dutch submarines and the sloop HNLMS Van Kinsbergen, but the submarines were soon moved to the United Kingdom to serve in the European theatre and Van Kinsbergen was redeployed to escort convoys leaving the defence of the Dutch Caribbean to the United States Navy. To strengthen the local regiments, Mico was requisitioned and militarized.

During the war the ship was continuously patrolling the waters around the Dutch Caribbean and Surinam. After the war's end the ship would be returned to its former owner in 1946 and serve out the rest of its days as a tug once again.
