= Almirante Brown (disambiguation) =

Almirante Brown may refer to a number of entities named after Irish-Argentine admiral William Brown:

== Football clubs ==
- Club Almirante Brown, Argentine football club from San Justo
- Club Atlético Almirante Brown, Argentine football club based in the town of Arrecifes in Buenos Aires Province
- Club Atlético Brown, an Argentine football club based in the City of Adrogué, capital of Almirante Brown Partido, Buenos Aires Province
- Club Social y Atlético Guillermo Brown, an Argentine football club based in the city of Puerto Madryn, Chubut Province

== Places ==
- Almirante Brown Partido, Buenos Aires Province, Argentina
- Almirante Brown Department, Chaco Province, Argentina
- Almirante Brown Antarctic Base, Argentina station in Paradise Harbor, Gerlache Strait, Antarctica

== Other ==
- ARA Almirante Brown, one of several ships serving in the Argentine Navy
