= ARA Veinticinco de Mayo =

ARA Veinticinco de Mayo or Veinticinco de Mayo may refer to one the following vessels of the Argentine Navy:

- Veinticinco de Mayo (1810), a brigantine launched in 1810, which served during the Independence War in the first Argentine naval squadron, and in the Civil War that followed
- Veinticinco de Mayo (1815), a schooner which served as a corsair during the Independence War
- Veinticinco de Mayo (1826), a frigate which served during the Cisplatine War
- Veinticinco de Mayo (1828), a frigate lost in a shipwreck in 1828
- Veinticinco de Mayo (1841), a frigate in service from 1841 to 1860
- Veinticinco de Mayo (1859), a steam-powered ship which was captured by Paraguay in 1865 causing the Argentine intervention in the Paraguayan War
- ARA Veinticinco de Mayo (1890), a cruiser in service from 1891 to 1916
- ARA Veinticinco de Mayo (C-2), a cruiser in service from 1931 to 1960
- ARA Veinticinco de Mayo (V-2), an aircraft carrier in service from 1969 to 1997

The English translation of the name is Twenty-fifth of May, which is the date of Argentina's May Revolution in 1810.
