= Hazemeyer gun mount =

Stabilized mount for the Bofors 40 mm

The Hazemeyer gun mount was a stabilised naval gun mount for the Bofors 40 mm anti-aircraft gun, used during World War II by the Royal Netherlands Navy and the Royal Navy. It was eventually replaced by the STAAG gun mount.

== Development ==
Manufactured by the Dutch Hazemeyer Company, the mount provided an alternative to the QF 2-pounder naval gun, as it was designed so that one set of layers aimed the gun, while a second manually stabilised the platform the gun sat on. The mount was self-contained and stabilised. The Dutch Hazemeyer Company was a subsidiary of the German company Siemens & Halske, but this technology had not been shared with the German headquarters. The mount combined with 40mm Bofors was displayed to the United States Navy ship USS Tuscaloosa on 20 August 1940 by the Dutch naval ship HNLMS Van Kinsbergen which achieved amazing results and impressed the Americans so much they decided to adopt this system. The system also gained a reputation for unreliability among many naval officers.

== See also ==
- Design 1047 battlecruiser

== Citations ==
=== Bibliography ===
- Mark, Chris (1997). Schepen van de Koninklijke Marine in W.O. II [Ships of the Royal Netherlands Navy in WW2] (in Dutch). Alkmaar, Holland: De Alk bv. ISBN 90-6013-522-9.
- Friedman, Norman (2014). Naval Anti-Aircraft Guns and Gunnery. Naval Institute Press. ISBN 9781612519579.
- Raven, G.J.A., ed. (1988). De kroon op het anker: 175 jaar Koninklijke Marine [The crown on the Anchor: 175 years of the Royal Navy] (in Dutch). Amsterdam: De Bataafsche Leeuw. ISBN 90-6707-200-1.
