= HNLMS Van Kinsbergen (1939) =

Sloop of the Royal Netherlands Navy

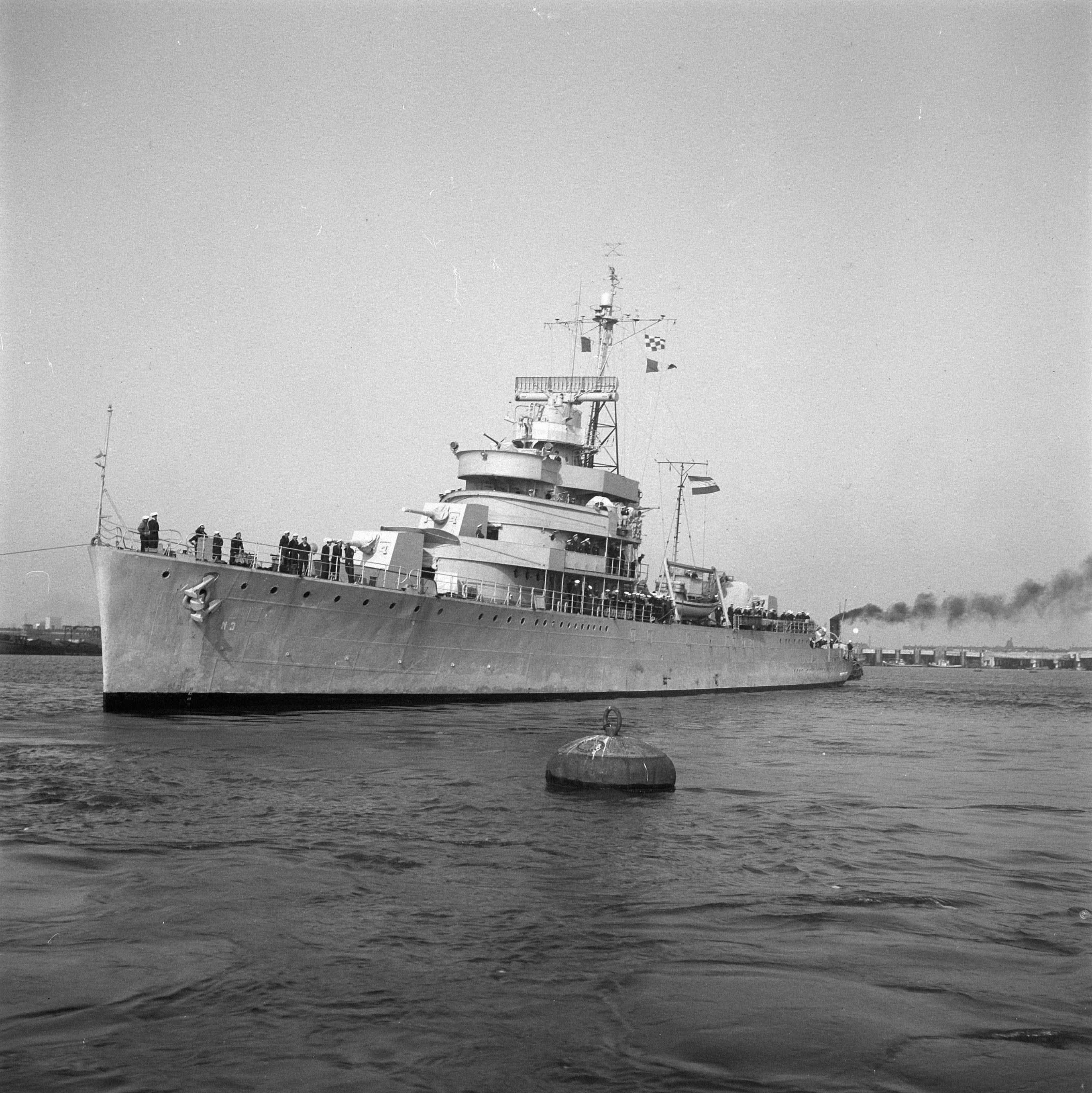
- Van Kinsbergen at sea in August 1948

History

Netherlands
- Name: Van Kinsbergen
- Namesake: Jan Hendrik van Kinsbergen
- Builder: Rotterdamsche Droogdok Maatschappij
- Laid down: 11 September 1937
- Launched: 5 January 1939
- Commissioned: 24 August 1939
- Decommissioned: 29 May 1959
- Nickname(s): Flying Dutchman
- Fate: Sold for scrap 1974

General characteristics
- Type: Unique sloop
- Displacement: 1760 tons (standard); 2388 tons (full load)
- Length: 100.2 m (328 ft 9 in)
- Beam: 11.6 m (38 ft 1 in)
- Draft: 3.4 m (11 ft 2 in)
- Installed power: 17,000 ihp (13,000 kW)
- Propulsion: 2 × triple-expansion steam engines; 2 × screws
- Speed: 25.5 kn (47.2 km/h; 29.3 mph)
- Complement: 183 (later 220)
- Armament: As built: 4 × 120 mm (4.7 in) guns 4 × 40 mm (1.57 in) guns 4 × 12.7 mm (0.5 in) machine guns 2 x Depth charge racks Added in 1945: 2 x Mousetraps After 1951 refit: 2 x 105 mm (4.1 in) guns 3 x 40 mm (1.57 in) guns 2 x 20 mm (0.8 in) guns 2 x Depth charge racks 2 x Mousetraps
- Armour: Belt: 13 mm (0.51 in); Armour deck: 20 mm (0.79 in); Conning tower: 20 mm (0.79 in)

HNLMS Van Kinsbergen (Dutch: Hr.Ms. Van Kinsbergen) was a unique sloop of the Royal Netherlands Navy build by Rotterdamsche Droogdok Maatschappij. She served in the Dutch West Indies in 1940. Later, she served as escort vessel and survived World War II. She was decommissioned on 29 May 1959 and was sold for scrap on 19 May 1974.

== Design ==
Van Kinsbergen was equipped with a hydrophone.

== Construction ==
Van Kinsbergen was laid down on by Rotterdamsche Droogdok Maatschappij on 11 September 1937 and was launched on 5 January 1939 and completed on 21 August 1939. She commissioned on 24 August 1939.

== Service history ==
On 26 August 1939, Van Kinsbergen left Den Helder port to meet with the Dutch submarine O 13 in the English Channel. After meeting with O 13, which returned from the West Indies, both ships returned to the Netherlands. On 2 October, Van Kinsbergen left Den Helder port with the submarines O 20 and O 15 accompanying her to the Dutch West Indies, where she was to relieve the sloop Johan Maurits van Nassau and to train new gunners. She arrived in Curaçao on 31 October.

On the evening of 1 November, Van Kinsbergen left port to intercept a British destroyer that had entered territorial waters; this was forbidden because of the Netherlands′ declaration of neutrality in September 1939. A similar incident occurred when a British cruiser entered the territorial waters. Both incidents were resolved without using force.

=== World War II ===
On 10 May 1940, war with Germany broke out, and boarding parties from Van Kinsbergen captured eight German merchant ships which were present at Curaçao, all were placed in service of the KNSM.

On 19 May 1940 Van Kinsbergen was placed under command of the British Commander in Chief for America and West Indies. She patrolled with allied ships and in the second half of July she was taking part in a search operation to find the German raider Widder together with British cruisers.

As the war continued, she took part in several other missions to capture merchant ships and rescue survivors from torpedoed ships. She continued naval operations for the Allies in the Caribbean sea under British supervision.

On 20 August 1940 Van Kinsbergen encountered the heavy cruiser USS Tuscaloosa somewhere in the Atlantic Ocean. Van Kinsbergen gave a demonstration of the 40mm guns that had been stabilized on a Hazemeyer patented mount. Together with excellent fire control, the gunners on the Van Kinsbergen achieved amazing results. The Americans were so impressed that they decided to use this system. To protect their patents, the Swedes were not eager to hand over the Bofors blueprints to the United States. The Americans could not wait for what they considered to be trivialities and obtained the blueprints through the Royal Netherlands Navy. The Dutch had them in safekeeping in the still unoccupied Netherlands East Indies. Only after the war were the Swedes compensated for this.

On 26 May 1941, Van Kinsbergen captured the Vichy French liner SS Winnipeg, which was sent to Port of Spain, Trinidad, and handed over to the British Ministry of War Transport.

In the period from December 1940 until June 1941 Van Kinsbergen captured a total of 12 enemy ships with a total tonnage of 49.486 tonnes.

On 7 July 1941 Van Kinsbergen left Curaçao for England, where she arrived on 24 July 1941 in Liverpool for overall maintenance. She was back in service on 6 September and returned to the West Indies.

On 2 January 1942 Van Kinsbergen was assigned to Task Force 6.3 of the Caribbean Patrol Force command.

From 19 April 1942 Van Kinsbergen searched for the German submarine U-130 which had bombarded Curaçao.

On 18 April 1942 had to leave the West Indies for urgent repairs. She sailed via Key West to Norfolk, where she was repaired by the Norfolk Naval Shipyard. She was back in service on 28 October 1942.

Until April 1944 Van Kinsbergen did patrol and convoy duties. On 16 April 1944 she was repaired again in Norfolk. On 23 July 1944 she set sail to New York, where maintenance was done and she participated in exercises. She was assigned to a "Killer-Group" patrolling the western part of the Atlantic Ocean, where she received the nickname "Flying Dutchman".

In September 1944 she received a new asdic system in New York together with a new searchradar.

On 30 December 1944 she went back to Curaçao, however on 10 January she left for Plymouth. Three days after she arrived in Plymouth on 23 January 1945 she went to Shadwell New Basin in London where she was until 29 August 1945.

=== After the war ===
On 31 August 1945 she arrived from London in Rotterdam, where she was repaired by the Rotterdamsche Droogdok Maatschappij.

On 14 October 1945 Van Kinsbergen set sail for the Dutch East Indies, exactly a year later she arrived back in the Netherlands.

In 1951 her armament was changed to be a frigate, this included her 4 120mm main guns being replaced by 2 102mm guns.

On 12 February 1952 she departed for a visit to New Guinea and Australia. She arrived back in the Netherlands on 4 February 1955.

Van Kinsbergen was converted to accommodation ship in Vlissingen, on 1 November 1955 her conversion to accommodation ship was completed. She was decommissioned on 29 May 1959 and was sold for scrap to the Belgian company Van Heyghen for 515,000 guilders on 19 May 1974.
