= HNLMS O 15 =

Coordinates: 8°40′N 111°40′E

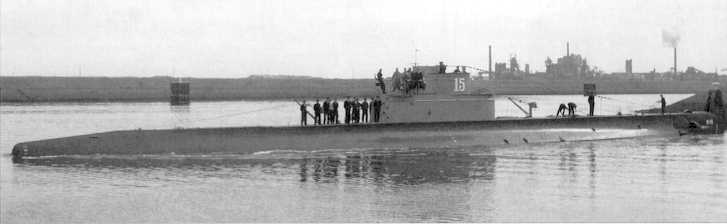
- HNLMS O 15 in 1935

History

Netherlands
- Name: HNLMS O 15
- Builder: Wilton-Fijenoord, Rotterdam
- Laid down: 3 March 1930
- Launched: 27 May 1931
- Commissioned: 28 July 1932
- Decommissioned: 11 September 1945
- Out of service: 2 October 1946

General characteristics
- Class & type: O 12-class submarine
- Displacement: 610 tons surfaced; 754 tons submerged
- Length: 60.4 m (198 ft 2 in)
- Beam: 6.8 m (22 ft 4 in)
- Draught: 3.6 m (11 ft 10 in)
- Propulsion: 2 × 900 bhp (671 kW) diesel engines; 2 × 310 bhp (231 kW) electric motors
- Speed: 16 kn (30 km/h; 18 mph) surfaced; 8 kn (15 km/h; 9.2 mph) submerged
- Range: 10,000 nmi (19,000 km; 12,000 mi) at 12 kn (22 km/h; 14 mph) on the surface; 28 nmi (52 km; 32 mi) at 8.5 kn (15.7 km/h; 9.8 mph) submerged
- Complement: 29-31
- Armament: 4 × 21 inch bow torpedo tubes; 1 × 21 inch stern torpedo tube; 2 × 44 mm guns; 1 × 12.7 mm machine gun

O 15 was a O 12-class submarine of the Royal Netherlands Navy that saw service during World War II. It was the only submarine of the O 12 class built by Wilton-Fijenoord of Rotterdam. It was one of many Dutch ships doing convoy duty during the Spanish Civil War. When World War II broke out O 15 was stationed in Curaçao. It returned to Europe and was based in Dundee, whence it patrolled the coast of Norway and accompanied convoys to Arkhangelsk. The sub survived World War II and was taken out of active duty just after the Japanese surrender. It was demolished in 1946 in Hendrik-Ido-Ambacht.

== Service history ==
=== Pre-war ===
With sister ship O 13, O 15 attended the Brussels International Exposition in 1935. On 22 March 1937 O 15 together with O 13 left Nieuwediep for Spanish waters to perform convoy duties for Dutch merchant ships during the Spanish Civil War. On 2 October 1939, the ship left with O 20 and the sloop Van Kinsbergen for Curaçao, via the long route (around Scotland) because of the threat of mines in the English Channel. After 27 days the ship arrived in Curaçao on 29 October.

=== Second World War ===
During the Battle of the Netherlands in 1940 O 15 was in the Curaçao harbor for maintenance. In early July, after consultations between the Royal Netherlands Navy and the Royal Navy led to the conclusion that there was no need for Dutch submarines in the Caribbean, O 15 was ordered to go to England via Kingston, Bermuda and Halifax. In Halifax repairs were made to the diesel engines which were due for an overhaul at Halifax Navy Yard. Since parts and workers were not available at Halifax, O 15 sailed to Philadelphia. It helped in testing the CSC (Canadian Sea Control) type radar and only crossed the Atlantic for Dundee, Scotland on 15 September 1942. It patrolled the Norwegian coast and accompanied convoys to Arkhangelsk and was used on occasion for anti-submarine warfare and ASDIC testing. For maintenance, O 15 received parts from O 14, which was decommissioned in 1943.

=== Post war ===
O 15 returned to the Netherlands on 30 June 1945 and was docked in Rotterdam until 23 July. It returned to Dundee for training but was taken out of active duty shortly after the Japanese surrender and decommissioned in September. For a while O 15 transported personnel from Dundee to Rotterdam, and was sold on 2 October 1946, then demolished in Hendrik-Ido-Ambacht.
