= Veinticinco de Mayo-class cruiser =

Argentine cruiser class

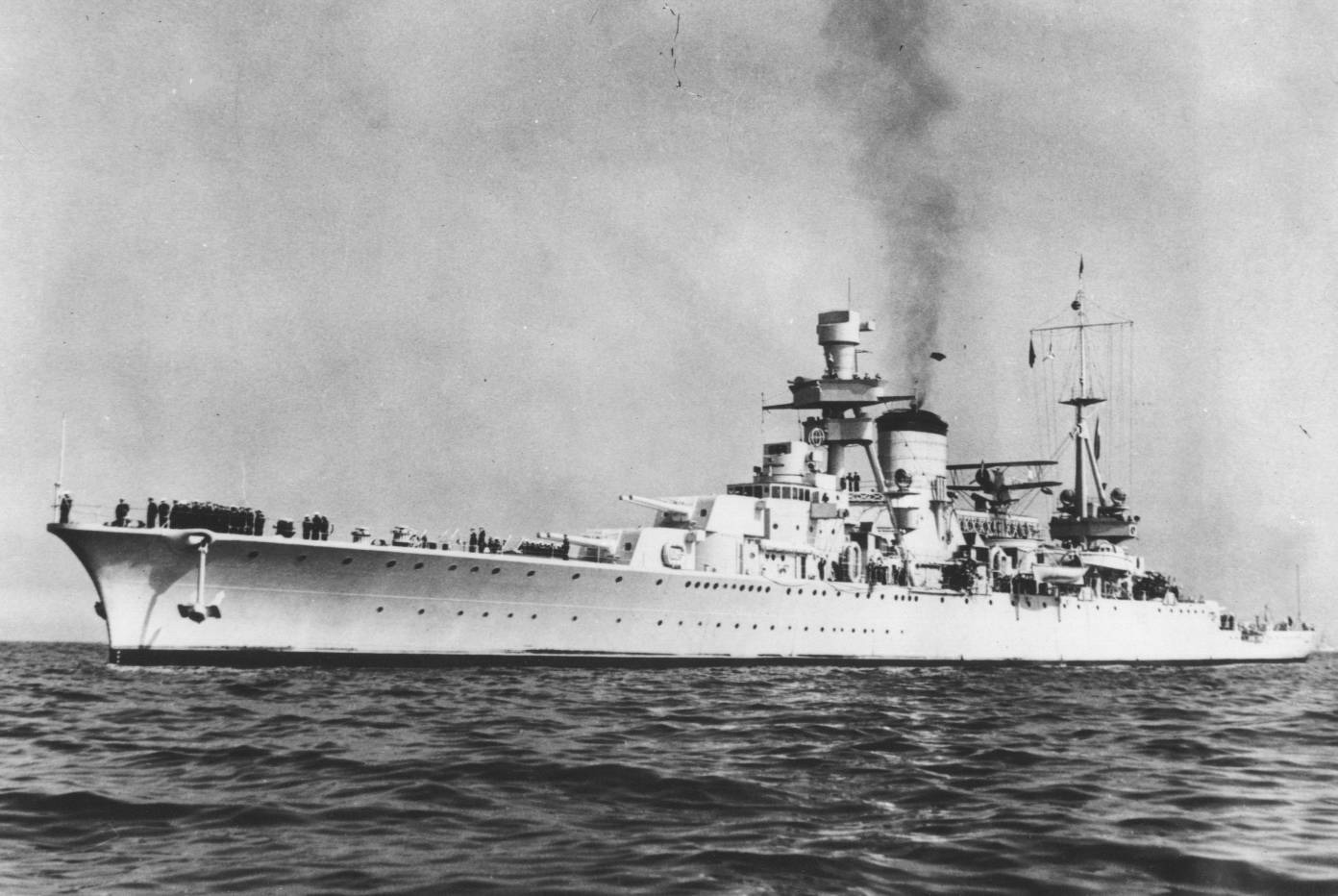
- Argentinian Cruiser ARA 25 de Mayo

Class overview
- Builders: OTO, Livorno
- Operators: Argentine Navy
- In commission: 1931 - 1961
- Planned: 3
- Canceled: 1
- Retired: 2

General characteristics ARA Veinticinco de Mayo
- Displacement: 6,800 tons (standard); 9,000 tons (full load)
- Length: 171 m (561 ft 0 in)
- Beam: 17.82 m (58 ft 6 in)
- Draught: 4.66 m (15 ft 3 in)
- Propulsion: 2 shaft Parsons turbines, 6 oil-fired boilers, 85,000 hp (63,000 kW)
- Speed: 32 knots (59 km/h)
- Range: 8,030 nautical miles (14,870 km) at 14 knots (26 km/h)
- Complement: 780
- Armament: 6 × 190 mm (7.5 inch)/52 caliber guns (3 × 2); 12 × 102 mm (4 inch)/45 caliber DP guns (6 × 2); 6 × Vickers-Terni 40/39 mm AA guns; 6 × 533 mm (21-inch) torpedo tubes
- Armour: 70 mm (2.75 inch) inch belt; 25 mm (1 inch) deck; 50 mm (2 inch) gun turrets; 60 mm (2.3 inch) conning tower
- Aircraft carried: 2 × Grumman J2F Duck aircraft
- Aviation facilities: Catapult launcher

The two Veinticinco de Mayo-class heavy cruisers served in the Argentine Navy through World War II. They were the only post-Washington Naval Treaty heavy cruisers built for a South American navy. Both ships of the class were built in Italy by the OTO company, and commissioned into the Argentine Navy in 1931.

== Background ==
Prior to the First World War, Argentina engaged in a vastly expensive naval arms race with its neighbors and rivals Brazil and Chile. As all three countries were forced to acquire their warships from abroad, the war effectively halted the race.

After the conflict's end, the Argentine Navy pushed their government to fund a new naval construction program and put their fleet on the same power level as Brazil's and Chile's. It took some time, but the Argentine Congress funded the modernization of the service's existing dreadnoughts and destroyers; they followed that three years later with 170 million Argentine pesos over ten years to expand the navy with new warships. Voting on the latter was quite contentious in the legislature's lower house, as it faced opposition from both opposition socialist politicians and a faction in the majority party that supported Hipólito Yrigoyen, the former president of Argentina. The bill passed only with Yrigoyen's explicit backing.

After an invitation to tender, the two Veinticinco de Mayo-class cruisers were ordered from Italy. In addition, the Argentine Navy contracted for five destroyers, three from the United Kingdom and two from Spain, and three submarines from Italy. Money remaining from the initial outlay was used to purchase seven additional destroyers in the mid-1930s, and additional monetary appropriations were used to purchase another cruiser (La Argentina).

== Design ==
The Veinticinco de Mayo design was derived from the Italian Trento class, identifiable by the closely paired main guns, similar to the last batches of the Condottieri-class cruisers. The ships were smaller than the original, and carried significantly less armour. They had a clean and simple design, with a length-width ratio of almost 10:1. Three twin turrets were mounted with an elevation of 46 degrees for firing.

They were not the first Argentinian cruiser class bought in Italy, as four Giuseppe Garibaldi-class armoured cruisers were brought into service 30 years before.

== Armament ==
The main 190 mm (7.5 inch) guns were designed especially for this class for greater stability (the Trento class carried 203 mm (8 inch) guns). The guns had single mounts to simplify construction, and could fire a 90 kg (200 lb) shell up to 23 kilometres (25,000 yd). Despite this reduction in size and weight, they were still too heavy, so the number of turrets were reduced from four to three. In most respects the resulting vessel was similar in profile to the British York class.

The secondary armament was also a new design, similar to standard 100–102 mm guns of the time. It consisted of twelve 102 mm (4 inch)/45 DP guns, firing a 13.5 kg (30 lb) shell, all in twin mounts. This was an unusual arrangement for Italian heavy cruisers, which generally carried sixteen of these weapons. However to counter the additional weight, gun shields were removed, which adversely affected their operability in bad weather conditions.

Unusually, the torpedo tubes were in fixed mounts amidships firing abeam, which caused problems in aiming effectively.

Light anti-aircraft artillery consisted of six Vickers-Terni 40/39 mm guns, all in single mounts, on the aft part of the superstructure. These guns were among the first automatic heavy weapons, firing 100-130 rounds per minute, but were of poor reliability. Though single mounts were simpler and more reliable, they offered poorer fire concentration. The Royal Navy used similar weapons in quad or even octuple mounts. Finally, a catapult launcher for seaplanes was placed over the fore deck.

Armour was within the standard for light rather than heavy cruisers. A 70 mm (2.8 in) armoured belt was fitted from the first to the last main turret. 60 mm (2.4 in) was used for the command turret. 50 mm (2.0 in) was used for turrets and barbettes. Only 25 mm (0.98 in) was provided for the armoured deck and above aft machinery.

== Post-war refit ==
After World War II the ships were modified to improve their stability by reducing weight. The powerful twin 102 mm gun batteries were replaced with six Bofors 40 mm guns, one for each twin mount, drastically reducing the secondary armament. Another four Bofors replaced the six Vickers AA guns. US Mk.53 radar directors were also installed to improve the effectiveness of anti-aircraft fire. The gain in stability, with several tons removed for each 102 mm gun, was somewhat offset by the addition of radar installations to the superstructure and masts. The aircraft catapult launcher was moved from the fore deck to mid-ships.

== Units ==
Although Argentina entered the Second World War with a declaration of war on the Axis powers on 27 March 1945, the remaining Axis navies were such that neither Almirante Brown or Veinticinco de Mayo played a role in the conflict. The ships proved popular with the Argentine Navy, until they were superseded by two Brooklyn-class cruisers acquired in 1951.

Construction data
Ship name	Hull number	Commissioned	Decommissioned	Fate
Almirante Brown	C-1	18 July 1931	27 June 1961	Sold for scrap, 1962
Veinticinco de Mayo	C-2	11 July 1931	27 June 1961	Sold for scrap, 1962

== Planned units ==
Argentina originally planned to acquire three of the class, but were limited to having only two built. They would turn to the United Kingdom for their next cruiser, acquiring La Argentina in 1938.

== See also ==
- List of cruisers

== Bibliography ==
- Montenegro, Guillermo J. "An Argentinian Naval Buildup in the Disarmament Era: The Naval Procurement Act of 1926." In Warship 2002–2003, edited by Antony Preston, 116–25. London: Conway Maritime Press, 2003. ISBN 0-85177-926-3. OCLC OCLC 50614660. Also published by the Universidad del Centro de Estudios Macroeconómicos de Argentina.
- Whitley, M.J. Cruisers of World War II: An International Encyclopedia. Annapolis, Maryland: Naval Institute Press, 1995. ISBN 1557501416. 34089382.
- Article in "Storia Militare" magazine, October 2007. (in Italian)
