= O 12-class submarine =

Class of submarine, Netherlands

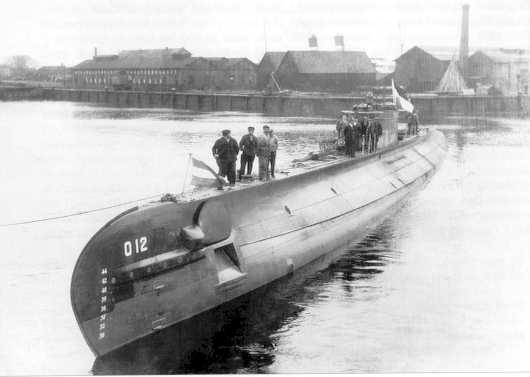
- HNLMS O 12

Class overview
- Name: O 12
- Builders: Koninklijke Maatschappij De Schelde (3); Fijenoord (1)
- Operators: Royal Netherlands Navy
- Preceded by: O 9 class
- Succeeded by: O 16
- Built: 1928–1932
- In commission: 1931–1945
- Completed: 4

General characteristics
- Type: Submarine
- Displacement: 610 tons surfaced; 754 tons submerged
- Length: 60.42 m (198 ft 3 in)
- Beam: 6.83 m (22 ft 5 in)
- Draught: 3.6 m (11 ft 10 in)
- Propulsion: 2 × 900 bhp (671 kW) diesel engines; 2 × 310 bhp (231 kW) electric motors
- Speed: 16 kn (30 km/h; 18 mph) surfaced; 8 kn (15 km/h; 9.2 mph) submerged
- Range: 3,500 nmi (6,500 km; 4,000 mi) at 8 kn (15 km/h; 9.2 mph) or 10 kn (19 km/h; 12 mph) on the surface; 26 nmi (48 km; 30 mi) at 8 kn (15 km/h; 9.2 mph) submerged
- Complement: 29–31
- Armament: 4 × 21 inch bow torpedo tubes; 1 × 21 inch stern torpedo tube; 2 × 44 mm guns; 1 × 12.7 mm machine gun

The O 12-class submarine consisted of four submarines built for the Royal Netherlands Navy. The ships, with a diving depth of 60 metres (200 ft), were used for patrols in the Dutch home waters. The class comprised O 12, O 13, O 14 and O 15. O 12 entered German service in 1943 as UD-2.

== Construction ==
The ships were built by two shipyards. O 12, O 13 and O 14 were built by Koninklijke Maatschappij De Schelde in Vlissingen and O 15 in Rotterdam at Fijenoord shipyard.

Name	Laid down	Launched	Commissioned	Decommissioned
O 12	20 October 1928	8 November 1930	Dutch Navy: 20 July 1931 German Navy: 30 January 1943	6 July 1945 (scuttled)
O 13	1 December 1928	18 April 1931	1 October 1931	13 June 1940
O 14	29 December 1928	3 October 1931	4 March 1932	26 June 1943
O 15	3 March 1930	27 May 1931	28 July 1932	1 September 1945
