= ARA Veinticinco de Mayo (C-2) =

Argentine warship

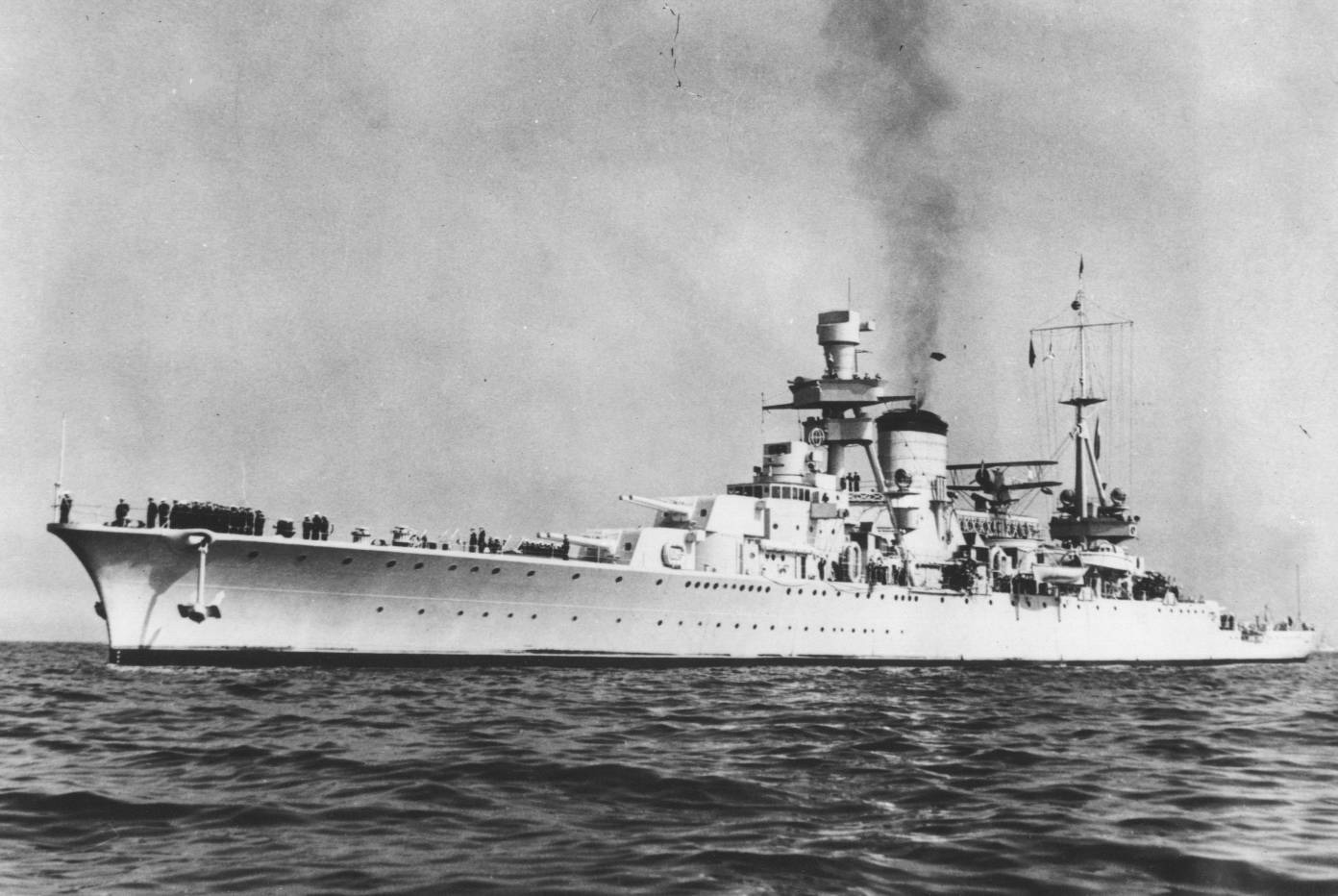

History

Argentina
- Name: Veinticinco de Mayo
- Namesake: May Revolution
- Builder: Cantiere navale fratelli Orlando, Livorno
- Laid down: 29 November 1927
- Launched: 11 August 1929
- Commissioned: 11 July 1931
- Fate: Scrapped 1960

General characteristics
- Class & type: Veinticinco de Mayo-class cruiser
- Displacement: 6,800t normal; 9,000t full load
- Length: 560.3 ft (170.8 m)
- Beam: 58.5 ft (17.8 m)
- Draught: 15.3 ft (4.7 m)
- Installed power: 85,000 hp (63,000 kW)
- Propulsion: Parsons turbine, 2 screws
- Speed: 32 knots (59 km/h)
- Range: 8,000 nautical miles (15,000 km) at 14 knots (26 km/h)
- Complement: 600
- Armament: 6 × 190 mm (7.5 inch)/52 caliber guns (3 × 2); 12 × 102 mm (4 inch)/45 caliber DP guns (6 × 2); 6 × Vickers-Terni 40/39 mm AA guns; 6 × 533 mm (21-inch) torpedo tubes
- Armour: Deck: 1 in (25 mm); Sides: 2.8 in (71 mm); Conning tower: 2.3 in (58 mm); Turrets: 2 in (51 mm)
- Aircraft carried: 2 × Grumman J2F Duck
- Aviation facilities: Catapult launcher

ARA Veinticinco de Mayo was a cruiser which served in the Argentine Navy. The English translation of the name is May 25, which is the date of Argentina's May Revolution in 1810.

== History and design ==
Veinticinco de Mayo was built in Italy and was the first ship of the Veinticinco de Mayo class of cruisers. Three vessels were to be produced, but in the end, only 25 de Mayo and her sister ship Almirante Brown were acquired, both in 1931.

These ships were unusual in several ways. First, they carried 7.5-inch guns, only the third class of warship to do so (the British Hawkins-class cruisers of World War I being another; a more typical main armament for heavy cruisers is 8-inch guns). Also, like the Italian Zara class and other Italian-built warships of the era they carried their floatplanes under the foredeck and launched them from a fixed catapult over the bows.

== See also ==
- List of cruisers
- List of ships of the Argentine Navy

== See also ==
- List of ships of the Argentine Navy
