= Bofors 40 mm L/60 gun =

1930s Swedish anti-aircraft autocannon design

Bofors 40 mm Automatic Gun L/60
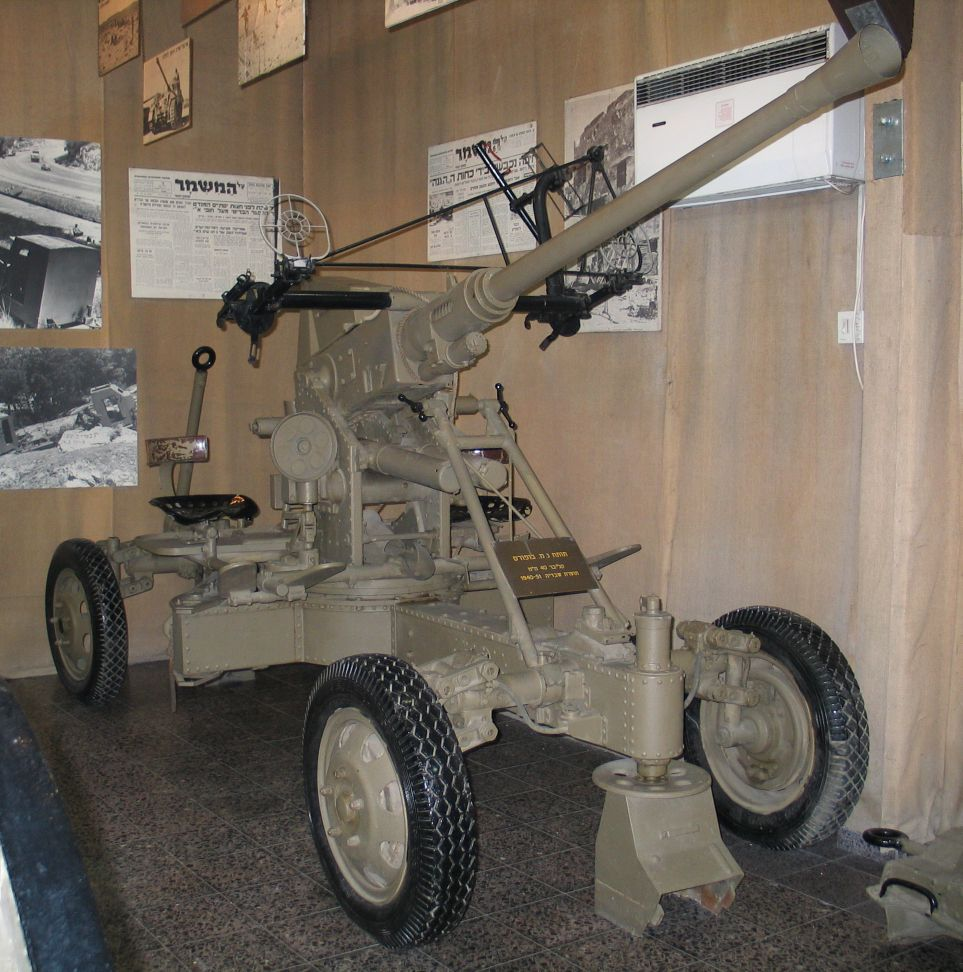
- Type: Autocannon
- Place of origin: Sweden

Service history
- In service: 1934–present
- Used by: See § Users
- Wars: See § Wars

Production history
- Designer: AB Bofors
- Designed: 1930
- Manufacturer: See § Manufacturers
- Produced: 1932–present
- No. built: >60,000 (L/60)
- Variants: See § Variants

Specifications (40 mm L/60)
- Barrel length: 2.25 m (7 ft 5 in)
- Crew: 4 (dependent on use)
- Shell: 40×311mmR
- Shell weight: 0.9 kg (2 lb 0 oz)
- Caliber: 40 mm (1.57 in)
- Action: Automatic extraction and integrated cam-operated recoil powered autoloader
- Breech: Vertical sliding-wedge
- Carriage: 522 kg (1,151 lb)
- Elevation: −5°/+90°, 55°/s
- Traverse: Full 360°, 50°/s
- Rate of fire: Low elevation angles: 140 rounds/min; High elevation angles: 120 rounds/min
- Muzzle velocity: 850–880 m/s (2,800–2,900 ft/s) (Note: L/43: 700–730 m/s (2,300–2,400 ft/s))
- Maximum firing range: 7,160 m (7,830 yd)

The Bofors 40 mm Automatic Gun L/60 (often referred to simply as the "Bofors 40 mm gun", the "Bofors gun" and the like, see name) is an anti-aircraft autocannon, designed in the 1930s by the Swedish arms manufacturer AB Bofors. The gun was designed as an intermediate anti-aircraft gun, filling the gap between fast firing close-range small calibre anti-aircraft guns and slower firing long-range high calibre anti-aircraft guns. For its time, the Bofors 40 mm L/60 was perfectly suited for this role and outperformed competing designs in the years leading up to World War II in both effectiveness and reliability.

It entered the export market around 1932 and was in service with 18 countries by 1939. Throughout World War II it became one of the most popular and widespread medium-weight anti-aircraft guns. It was used by the majority of the western Allies and some Axis powers such as Nazi Germany and Hungary.

In the post-war era, the Bofors 40 mm L/60 design was not suitable for action against jet-powered aircraft, so Bofors developed a new 40 mm replacement design with significantly more power—the Bofors 40 mm Automatic Gun L/70, also known under the generic name 'Bofors 40 mm gun'—which was adopted by many nations during the Cold War and was selected as NATO-standard in November 1953. The Bofors 40 mm L/60 would however continue to see service long after becoming obsolete as an anti-aircraft weapon due to the massive number of surplus guns from WWII, and a small number of Bofors 40 mm L/60 guns remain in service today. Some weapons saw action as late as the Gulf War and Yugoslav Wars.

== Name ==
The Bofors 40 mm Automatic Gun L/60 is known under a variety of names around the world. In common historical nomenclatures it is commonly known under the names Bofors 40 mm gun, 40 mm Bofors gun and Bofors gun. This mostly stems from Western Allied usage of the gun during World War II. For example, British anti-air batteries armed with the gun during the war received the nickname "The Bofors Boys". There were other guns by Bofors which also had these nicknames, the most common being the Bofors 40 mm Automatic Gun L/70, leading some to think they are the same gun.

Bofors itself never marketed the gun or its variants with a clear standardized name or abbreviation. In the vast majority of 1930s marketing material the gun is sold under a variety of descriptive names depending on the configuration, such as: "40 mm Automatic Field Gun L/60" to "40 mm Automatic A.A. Gun L/60 in Field Carriage" or "40 mm Automatic Naval Gun L/60" to "40 mm Automatic A.A. Gun L/60 in Naval Mounting". This theme transfers over to other languages as well: Swedish: 40 mm fältautomatkanon L/60, German: 40 mm feldluftautomatkanone L/60, Spanish: Cañón automatico de campaña de 40 mm L/60 Bofors. Only the caliber of 40 mm and caliber length of L/60 are somewhat universal in branding.

Due to this the gun is often specified by the calibre length "L/60". Enthusiasts and experts usually call the gun "Bofors 40 mm L/60" or simply "Bofors 40/60" and the like. In some Bofors material the gun is standardized under the English name "Bofors 40 mm Automatic Gun L/60".

=== Calibre length ===
Contrary to the name, the Bofors 40 mm Automatic Gun L/60 has an actual barrel length of 56.25 calibres – 2,250 mm (7 ft 5 in). Due to this, the gun can at times be found under the designation L/56. The L/60 calibre length – 2,400 mm (94 in) – refers to the length of the barrel and breech mounted as a unit. The gun has also been cited with a caliber length of L/62 on occasion. This refers to the length of the barrel – 2,250 mm – when equipped with the conical flash hider – 250 mm (9.8 in); amounting to a length of 2,500 mm (8 ft 2 in), or 62.5 calibres. Similarly, the shorter L/43 calibre length – 1,720 mm (5 ft 8 in) – refers to the length of the barrel and breech mounted as a unit. The actual barrel length is 1,570 mm (5 ft 2 in) – 39.25 calibres. With a flash hider or muzzle brake mounted the barrel length becomes 1,740 mm (5 ft 9 in) or 1,760 mm (5 ft 9 in).

== Development ==
In 1922, the Swedish Navy purchased a number of 40 mm 2-pounder "pom-poms" from Vickers as anti-aircraft guns. The navy approached Bofors about the development of a more capable replacement, and Bofors signed a contract in late 1928. The company produced a gun that was a smaller version of a 57 mm (6-pounder) semi-automatic gun, developed as an anti-torpedo boat weapon in the late 19th century by Finspång. Bofors' first test gun was a re-barrelled Nordenfelt version of the Finspång gun, to which was added a semi-automatic loading mechanism.

Testing of the gun in 1929 showed that a problem existed with feeding the weapon to maintain a reasonable rate of fire. A mechanism that was strong enough to handle the stresses of moving the large round was too heavy to operate quickly enough to fire rapidly. One attempt to solve the problem used zinc shell cases that burned up when fired. However, that left heavy zinc deposits in the barrel and had to be abandoned. In the summer of 1930, experiments were conducted with a new test gun that did away with controlled feed and instead flicked the spent casing out the rear, after which a second mechanism reloaded the gun by "throwing" a fresh round into the open breech from the magazine. That improved firing rates to an acceptable level, so work on a prototype commenced soon after.

During that period, Krupp purchased a one-third share of Bofors. Krupp engineers began the process of updating the Bofors factories with modern equipment and metallurgy, but the 40 mm project was kept secret.

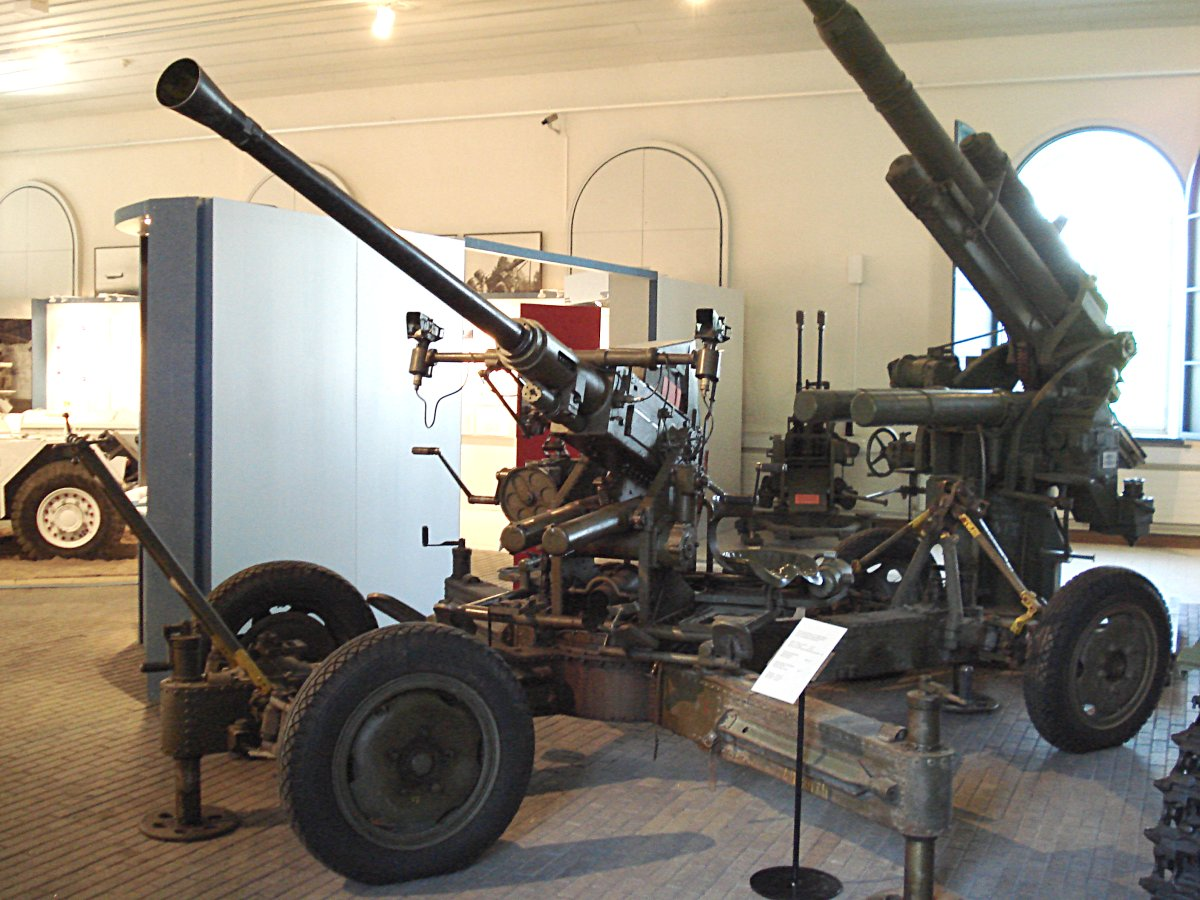
Finnish Bofors 40 mm. This gun mounts the original reflector sights, and lacks the gun shield found on British examples

The prototype was completed and fired in November 1931 and, by the middle of the month, it was firing strings of two and three rounds. Changes to the feed mechanism were all that remained and, by the end of the year, the gun was operating at 130 rounds per minute. The development needed to turn it into a weapon suitable for production was completed in October 1933. Because acceptance trials had been passed the year before, it became known as the "40 mm akan M/32". Most forces referred to it as the "Bofors 40 mm L/60", although the barrel was actually 56.25 calibres in length, not the 60 calibres that the name implied.

The gun fired a 900 g (2.0 lb) high explosive shell at 2,960 ft/s (900 m/s) from a 40 × 311 rimmed cartridge. The rate of fire was normally about 120 rounds per minute (2 rounds per second), which increased slightly when the barrels were closer to the horizon, because gravity assisted the feeding from the top-mounted magazine. Practical firing rates were closer to 80–100 rpm, because the rounds were fed into the breech from four-round clips which had to be replaced by hand. The maximum attainable ceiling was 7,200 m (23,600 ft), but the practical maximum was about 3,800 m (12,500 ft).

The gun was provided with an advanced sighting system. The trainer and layer were both provided with reflector sights for aiming, while a third crew-member, standing behind them, "adjusted" for lead using a simple mechanical computer. Power for the sights was supplied from a 6V battery.

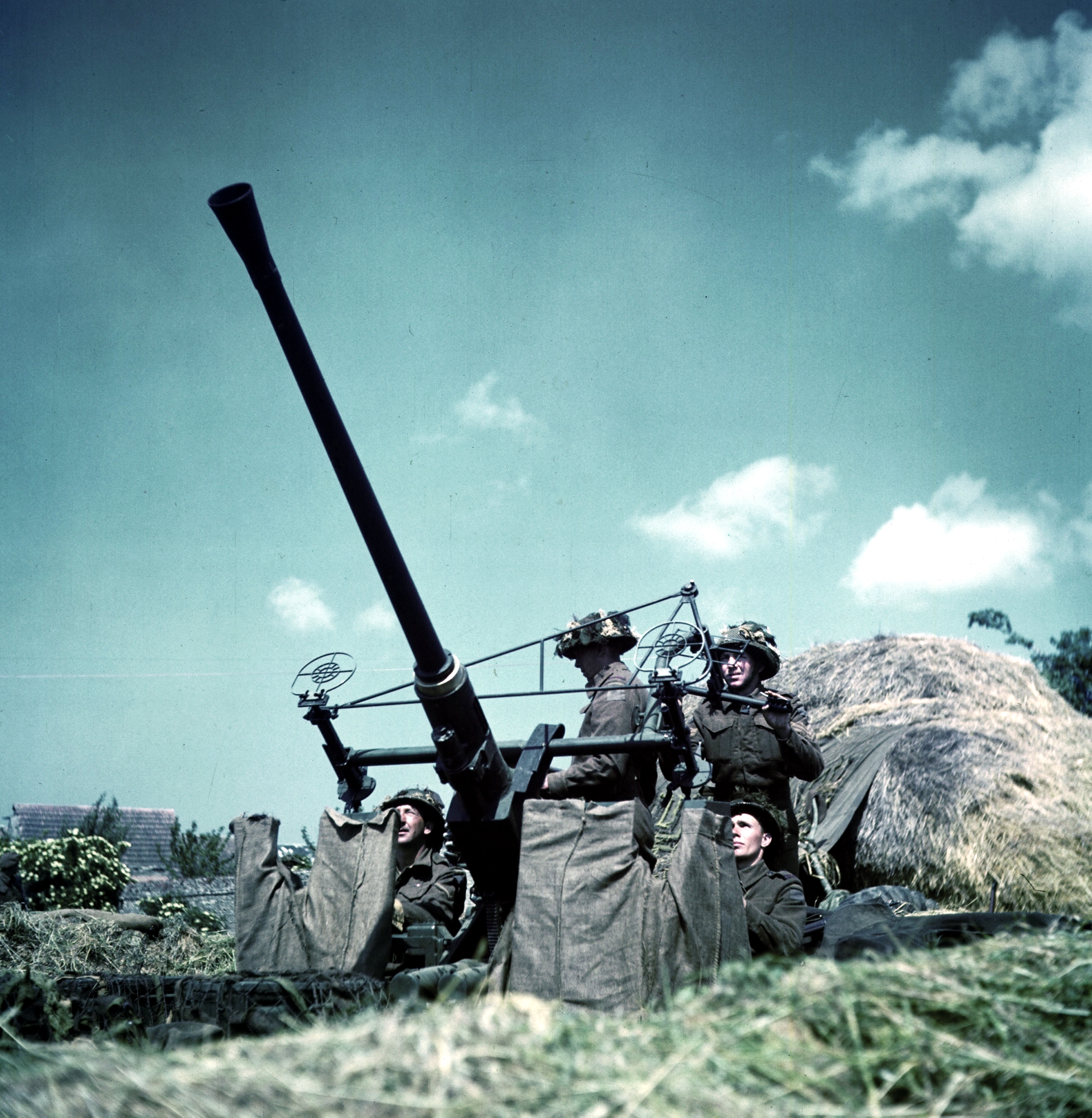
British 40mm L/60 with Stiffkey Sight, being operated by the gun layer standing on the right. The layer operates the trapeze seen above the sights, moving them to adjust for lead. The loader stands to the layer's left, and the two trainer/aimers are sitting on either side of the gun.

In spite of the successful development, the Swedish Navy changed its mind and decided it needed a smaller hand-traversed weapon of 13 mm-25 mm size, and tested various designs from foreign suppliers. With the development of the 40 mm well advanced, Bofors offered a 25 mm version in 1932, which was eventually selected as the Bofors 25 mm M/32.

The first version of the 40 mm the Swedish Navy ordered was intended for use on submarines, because the larger calibre allowed the gun to be used both as an anti-aircraft gun, and against smaller ships. The barrel was shorter, at 43 calibres, which reduced the muzzle velocity to about 700 m/s (2,300 ft/s). When not in use, the gun was pointed directly up and retracted into a watertight cylinder. The only known submarines that used that arrangement were the Sjölejonet-class boats. The guns were later removed when the submarines were modified with streamlined conning towers.

The first order for the "real" L/60 was made by the Dutch Navy, which ordered five twin-gun mounts for the cruiser De Ruyter in August 1934. Those guns were stabilized using the Hazemeyer mount, in which one set of layers aimed the gun, while a second manually stabilized the platform the gun sat on. All five mounts were operated by one fire-control system.

Bofors also developed a towable carriage, which was displayed at a show in Belgium in April 1935. That mount allowed the gun to be fired from the carriage with no set-up required, although it had limited accuracy. If time was available for set-up, the gunners used the tow-bar and muzzle lock as levers, raising the wheels off the ground and so lowering the gun onto supporting pads. Two additional legs folded out to the sides, and the platform was then levelled with hand cranks. The entire set-up process could be completed in under a minute.

Orders for the land-based versions were immediate, starting with one for eight weapons from Belgium in August 1935, followed by a flood of orders from other forces including Poland, Norway, and Finland. It was accepted into the Swedish Army the next year, and known as the "40 mm lvakan m/36", the lower-case "m" indicating an army model as opposed to the capital "M" for the navy.

=== Licensed production ===
Within a few years AB Bofors received a number of orders from foreign governments including Poland, Finland, Greece and Norway negotiated for licenses to produce the gun and its ammunition. By 1939 Bofors guns were in production across Europe for many armies in a bewildering arrangement of cross-deals. For instance, the United Kingdom took out a license, but was in such a hurry to re-arm with the Bofors gun that it also purchased some from Poland and Hungary. France wanted to set up a line but purchased guns from Poland. Poland meanwhile developed its own version of Bofors gun, contributing a lighter carriage (in the 40 mm armata przeciwlotnicza Bofors wz. 36) which was later adopted by the British. (Note: 40 mm L/60 Model 1936 (NavWeaps), p. Use by Other Nations)

The Swedish navy adopted the weapon as the m/36 in two versions: hand-worked single air-cooled, and power-operated twin water-cooled. A twin air-cooled mounting, probably hand-worked, was also used by the navies of Sweden and Argentina, and a twin air-cooled wet mounting was developed for Polish submarines.

== British versions ==
=== Army and RAF Regiment versions ===
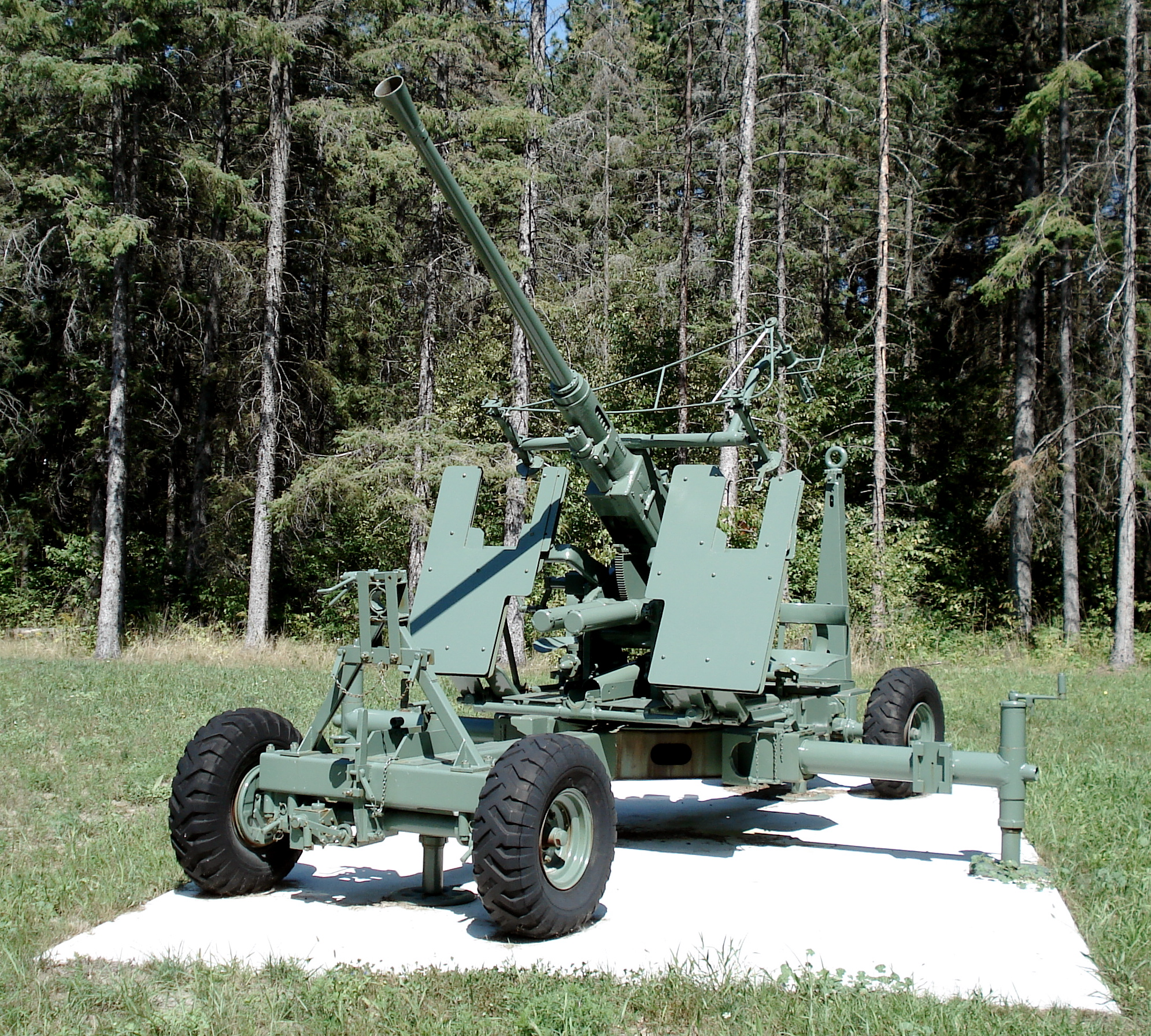
Q.F. 40 mm Mk. 1 displayed at CFB Borden. This example mounts a Stiffkey Sight, and displays the additional armor protecting the gunners

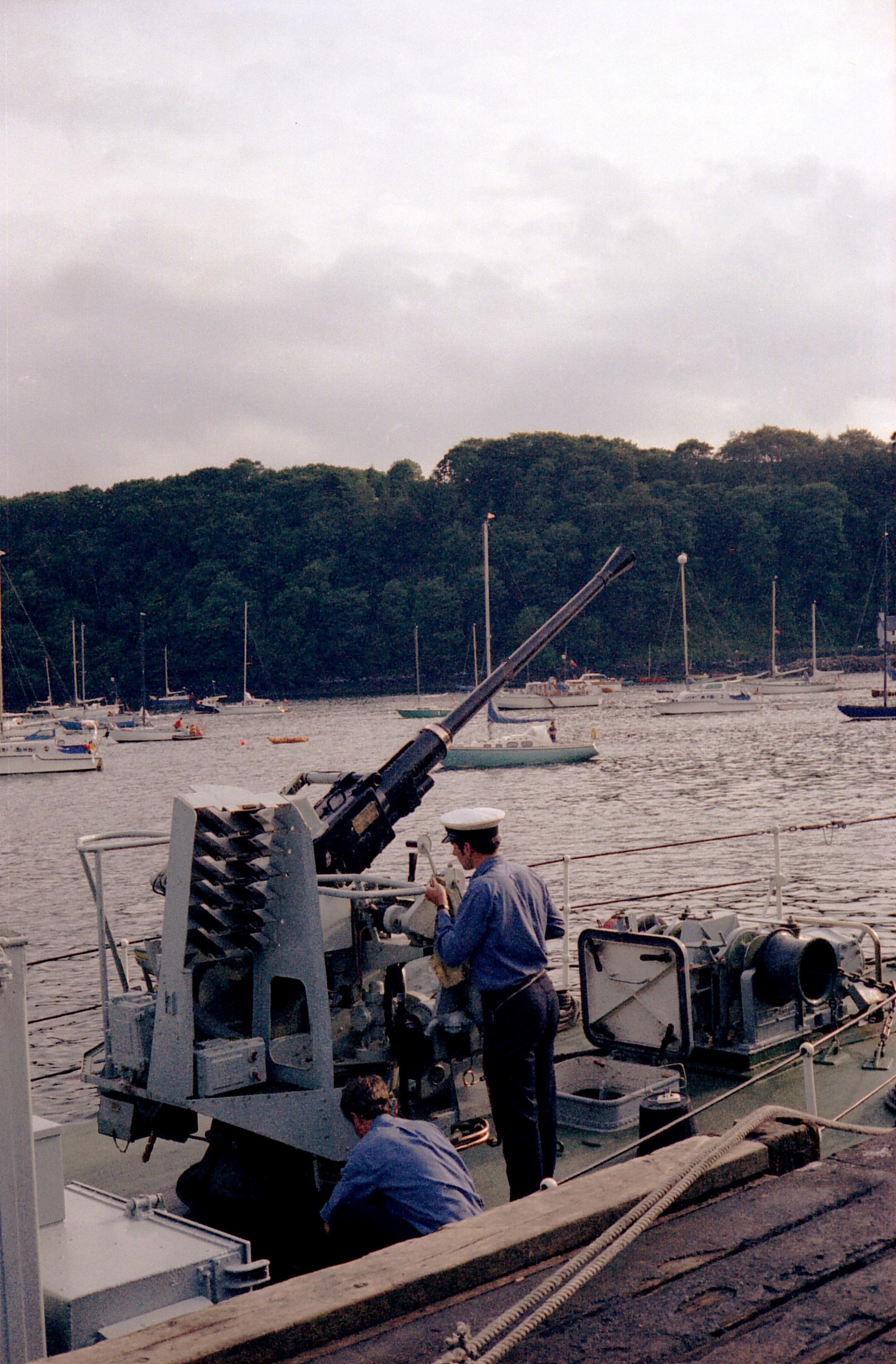
Bofors gun on the Ley-class minehunter HMS Isis (1978)

The British Army had first examined the weapon in 1937, when it received a number of Polish-built examples for testing. They were known as the "QF 40 mm Mark I" (QF standing for "quick firing"). With a minor change to the flash hider, they were designated "Mark I/2". A production licence was acquired, and the gun was converted from metric to imperial measurements. Numerous changes were made to the design so that it was more suitable for mass production, because the original Bofors design was intended to be hand-assembled. Many parts were labelled "file to fit on assembly", requiring many man-hours of work to complete.

Testing showed that there was a serious problem with aiming the gun at high-speed aircraft. Although it could be trained quickly, aiming accurately while doing so proved difficult. In order to deal with that, the British introduced a complex mechanical analogue computer, the Kerrison Director, which drove the laying electrically. A three-man team operated the director by pointing it at the target whilst dialing in estimates for speed, range, and various atmospheric conditions. The director then aimed the gun using powered mounts, while a gunner loaded the clips. That eliminated the need for the lead-correcting reflector sights, which were replaced with a backup system consisting of a simple ring-and-post sight, known as a "pancake".

In that form, the "QF 40 mm Mark III" (Mk II was a designation used for a version of the naval "pom-pom" anti-aircraft gun), became the army's standard light anti-aircraft (AA) weapon, operating alongside their 3-inch 20 cwt and 3.7-inch heavy AA guns. British production started slowly and, by September 1939 only 233 equipments had been produced. However, by the end of the war, the total production of British, Canadian and Australian factories numbered over 19,000. The peak production year was 1942, when British factories produced 5,025 and Canadian factories produced 1,311.

In combat, it was found that the Kerrison was difficult to set up in many situations, as well as making logistics more complex, due to the need to keep its electrical generator supplied with fuel. In most engagements, only the pancake sights were used, without any form of correction, making the British versions less capable than those used by other forces. Eventually, an anti-aircraft gunnery school on the range at Stiffkey on the Norfolk coast, delivered a workable solution, a trapeze-like arrangement that moved the pancake sights to offer lead correction, operated by a new crew-member standing behind the left-hand layer. The "Stiffkey Sight" was sent out to units in 1943, arriving in Canadian units in the midst of the Battle of the Aleutian Islands. A final wartime change to the elevation mechanism resulted in the "QF 40 mm Mark XII". A much lighter, two-wheeled carriage was also developed for airborne use.

The army experimented with various self-propelled anti-aircraft guns based on various tank chassis. Changes to the breech for that role created the "QF 40 mm Mark VI", which was used on the Crusader tank to produce the Crusader III AA Mark I. The main self-propelled version of the Bofors was the gun mounted on a chassis derived from the Morris C8 "Quad" artillery tractor, which was known as the "Carrier, 30 cwt, SP, 4×4, 40 mm AA (Bofors)" or Morris-Commercial C9/B. Such guns were used in support of army divisions, to provide swift protection against air attack without the need to unlimber. They saw service in north-west Europe, where six SP Bofors of 92nd (Loyals) Light Anti-Aircraft Regiment, Royal Artillery, landed with the British 3rd Infantry Division on Sword Beach on D-Day, to protect the vital bridges over the Caen Canal and the Orne River (Pegasus Bridge and Horsa Bridge), shooting down 17 German planes. Later in the campaign, SP Bofors were used extensively for ground shoots as well as in an anti-aircraft role.

In British Army service, the Bofors found a highly specialised role: during the North Africa campaign, at the Second Battle of El Alamein, they were used to fire tracer horizontally to mark safe paths for units through the German minefields. That practice was further developed during operations in north-west Europe, where bursts of colour-coded tracer were used to define the axis of advance of different formations in large-scale night attacks.

The RAF Regiment was formed in February 1942, in response to the German capture of airfields with airborne troops in the Battle of Crete, which resulted in strategic defeat on the island by numerically inferior German forces. The formation of a dedicated airfield defence force included low-level air defence, in which the Bofors L60 — the same design as the Army version — was the principal weapon for the RAF Regiment's Light Anti-Aircraft squadrons in North Africa, Malta, Italy, the Balkans, the UK (including the allocation of fifty-two squadrons to Operation Diver defence against V-1 flying bombs in southern England), and north-western Europe (from Normandy landings through to the cessation of hostilities).

No 2875 Squadron RAF Regiment, employing the L60, became the first unit to shoot down a jet aircraft, a Messerschmitt Me 262, with ground-based anti-aircraft fire, at Helmond in the Netherlands on 28 November 1944. Although the Allied air forces had achieved air superiority by the Normandy landings, Advanced Landing Grounds continued to be high-priority targets for the Luftwaffe when the opportunity presented, and that ensured that the RAF Regiment's L60s continued to be heavily used. For example, on New Year's Day 1945, during the Battle of the Bulge, RAF Regiment Light Anti-Aircraft squadrons shot down 43 German aircraft and damaged 28 others during the Operation Bodenplatte attacks on eleven RAF forward airfields. There were insufficient guns available to equip the RAF Regiment squadrons in the Far East during the war, and they had to make do mostly with 20 mm Hispano and Oerlikon 20 mm guns.

A Light Anti-Aircraft field regiment (one with each infantry division) had 54 Bofors guns.

After World War II, the RAF Regiment continued to employ the L60 as its principal anti-aircraft weapon until it was replaced by the L70 gun in 1957. The guns were deployed in the UK, Germany, Cyprus, the Middle East, and the Far East.

=== Naval versions ===
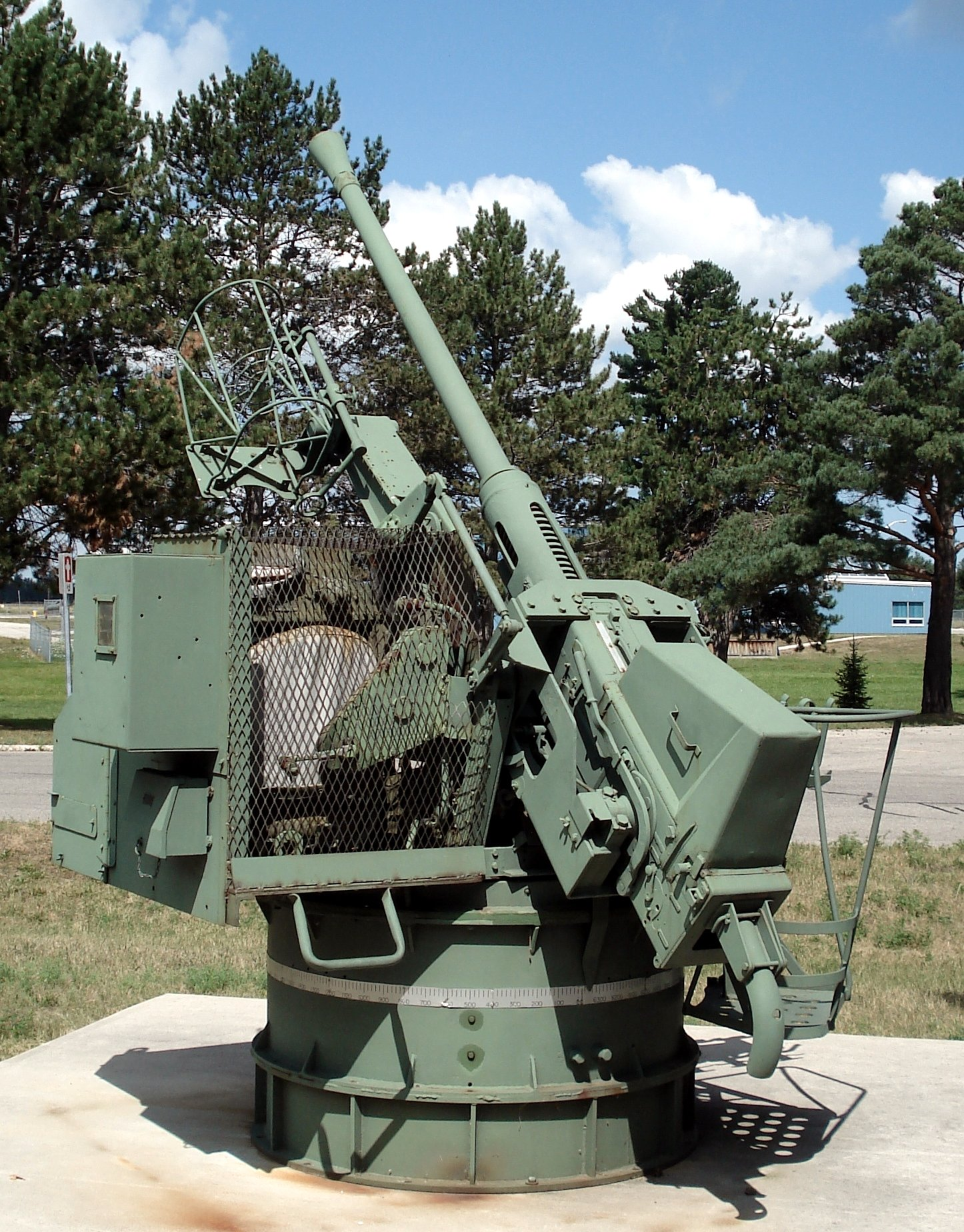
Single Bofors 40 mm Boffin mounting, displayed at CFB Borden. In 1996, museum pieces like this cannon were pressed back into service as the main armament of the Kingston-class minesweepers.

The Royal Navy also made extensive use of the Bofors. Its first examples were air-cooled versions quickly adapted for ships during the withdrawal from Norway. After the German invasion of the Netherlands in May 1940, the Dutch minelayer, HNLMS Willem van der Zaan, gave the navy its first example of a water-cooled gun on its Hazemeyer tri-axially stabilized mounting. Locally produced examples started arriving in 1942, known as the "QF 40 mm Mark IV" with twin-mounts, or the "QF 40 mm Mark V" with single mounts. The navy ran through a variety of versions of the basic Bofors gun over the war, including the Mark VII to Mark XI. The British light anti-aircraft weapon already in use with the Royal Navy's, the QF 2-pounder gun, also had a calibre of 40 mm, but was referred to as the QF 2-pdr.

In the Royal Navy guns and mounts were designated separately. The following mountings were used:

- Mark I: twin mounting based on American design and using American-built guns, not widely fitted. Fitted for remote fire control.
- Mark II: quadruple version similar to the Mark I
- Mark III: a navalized version of the Army single mounting, hand worked elevation and training.
- Mark IV: a tri-axially stabilized twin mounting, copied from, and usually known as, the "Hazemeyer". It had on-mounting fire control, and was usually fitted with Radar Type 282 to provide target range information.
- Mark V: twin mounting, which superseded, and eventually replaced, the Mark IV, often referred to as the "utility" mounting. It was a simplified, unstabilised mounting based on the American twin mounting Mark I, and was designed for remote fire control.
- Mark VI: a six-barreled weapon, feeding from large trays instead of clips, and designed for remote control from a dedicated radar-equipped director.
- Mark VII: a single-barreled, hydraulically powered mounting, that superseded the Mark III and entered service in 1945.
- Mark IX: Mark VII mount modified for electrical power, as the Mounting Mark IX and, in that form, saw service in the Falklands War.

The Mounting Mark V (Mark VC for Canadian built examples) for the 20 mm Oerlikon and QF 2 pounder guns was also adopted initially as an interim mount for the Bofors. It was a single-barrelled mounting with hydraulic power, and was known as the "Boffin".

The final British Bofors mounting to see service was the "Stabilized Tachymetric Anti-Aircraft Gun" (STAAG), which was twin-barrelled, stabilised, and carried its own tachymetric (i.e. predictive) fire control system, based around the centimetre Radar Type 262, capable of "locking on" to a target. The mounting was heavy (17.5 tons) and the high-vibration of the gun mounting made it a poor location for sensitive valve electronics and mechanical computers. The STAAG Mark I carried the radar dish over the gun barrels, where it was subject to damage during firing so, on the STAAG Mark II, the set was shifted to the roof of the control cabin. STAAG was ultimately too difficult to maintain in the harsh environment of a warship and was replaced by the Mounting Mark V, with the fire control equipment located remotely, then by the single Mark VII and, ultimately, with the GWS20 Seacat missile system. The final version of STAAG was fitted to the RN Type 12 Whitby-class anti-submarine frigates and the Type 41 Leopard anti-aircraft and Type 61 Salisbury air direction frigates, completed from 1956 to 1958. The cruiser Royalist was also fitted with the STAAG Mk 2 during modernisation before transfer to the RNZN in the 1950s. Initially, it had three STAAG CIWS, the STAAG in Q position was removed in 1960, but it carried two mounts until the end of its service in Southeast Asian waters, in 1965. In 1956 during the Suez Crisis, the crew of Royalist seemed to find the STAAG a reasonably effective anti-aircraft weapon in Operation Musketeer.

== U.S. versions ==
=== Manufacturing ===
In order to supply both the U.S. Army and U.S. Navy with much greater numbers of the guns, Chrysler built 60,000 of the guns and 120,000 barrels through the war, at half the original projected cost, and filling the Army's needs by 1943. Over the lifetime of the production, their engineers introduced numerous changes to improve mass production, eventually halving the overall time needed to build a gun. Most of the changes were in production methods rather than the design of the gun itself: for example, milling from steel block was replaced by stampings and castings whenever possible, and Amplex division of Chrysler (which normally manufactured oilite) produced nine parts by sintering. York Safe & Lock also produced the weapons, though its attempts to coordinate drawings across the program were unsuccessful, and this responsibility was transferred to the Naval Gun Factory in July 1943.

There were many difficulties in producing the guns within the United States, beyond their complexity (2,000 subcontractors in 330 cities and 12 Chrysler factories were used to make and assemble the parts). The drawings were metric, in Swedish, with loose tolerances for hand fitting, and were in first-angle projection. Chrysler had to convert to imperial measures, translate drawings to English, fix absolute dimensions, and reorder the drawings to third-angle projection. Chrysler engineers also tried to simplify the gun, unsuccessfully, and to take high-speed movies to find possible improvements, but this was not possible until near the end of the war.

Swedish blueprints had many notes on them such as "file to fit at assembly" and "drill to fit at assembly," all of which took much production time in order to implement. Thirdly, the Swedish mountings were manually worked, while the USN required power-worked mountings in order to attain the fast elevation and training speeds necessary to engage modern aircraft. Fourthly, the Swedish guns were air-cooled, limiting their ability to fire long bursts, a necessity for most naval AA engagements. Finally, the USN rejected the Swedish ammunition design, as it was not boresafe, the fuze was found to be too sensitive for normal shipboard use and its overall design was determined to be unsuitable for mass production.

=== Naval ===
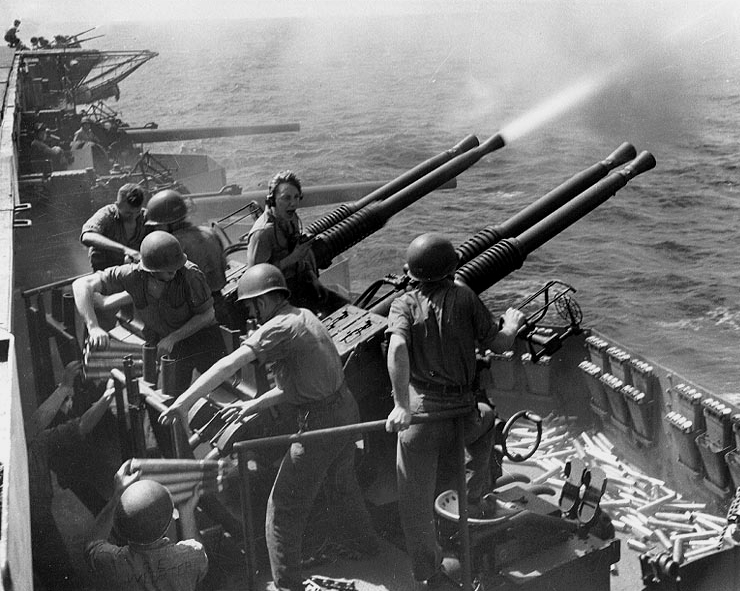
A MK 12 quadruple mount of Bofors guns fires from USS Hornet

The United States Navy's Bureau of Ordnance purchased a twin-mount air-cooled example, spare parts and 3,000 rounds of ammunition directly from Bofors, which arrived in New York on 28 August 1940 aboard the Army transport USAT American Legion, which had evacuated 897 people, including members of the Norwegian royal family, through the Finnish port of Petsamo. During that month another Dutch ship, the Van Kinsbergen, demonstrated the Hazemeyer mount to Navy observers. The gun was quickly chosen as the Navy's standard anti-aircraft weapon over the British 40 mm calibre, 2-pounder pom-pom; however, negotiations with Bofors for licensed production stalled when the Swedes requested airplane export and manufacturing licenses in return. Reportedly, the Navy secretly imported a set of imperial designs from Britain and started production illegally. A formal contract with Bofors was reached in June 1941. The resulting Mark 1 and Mark 2 weapons were intended for the left and right side of a twin mount, respectively, and were adapted by Chrysler for water cooling.

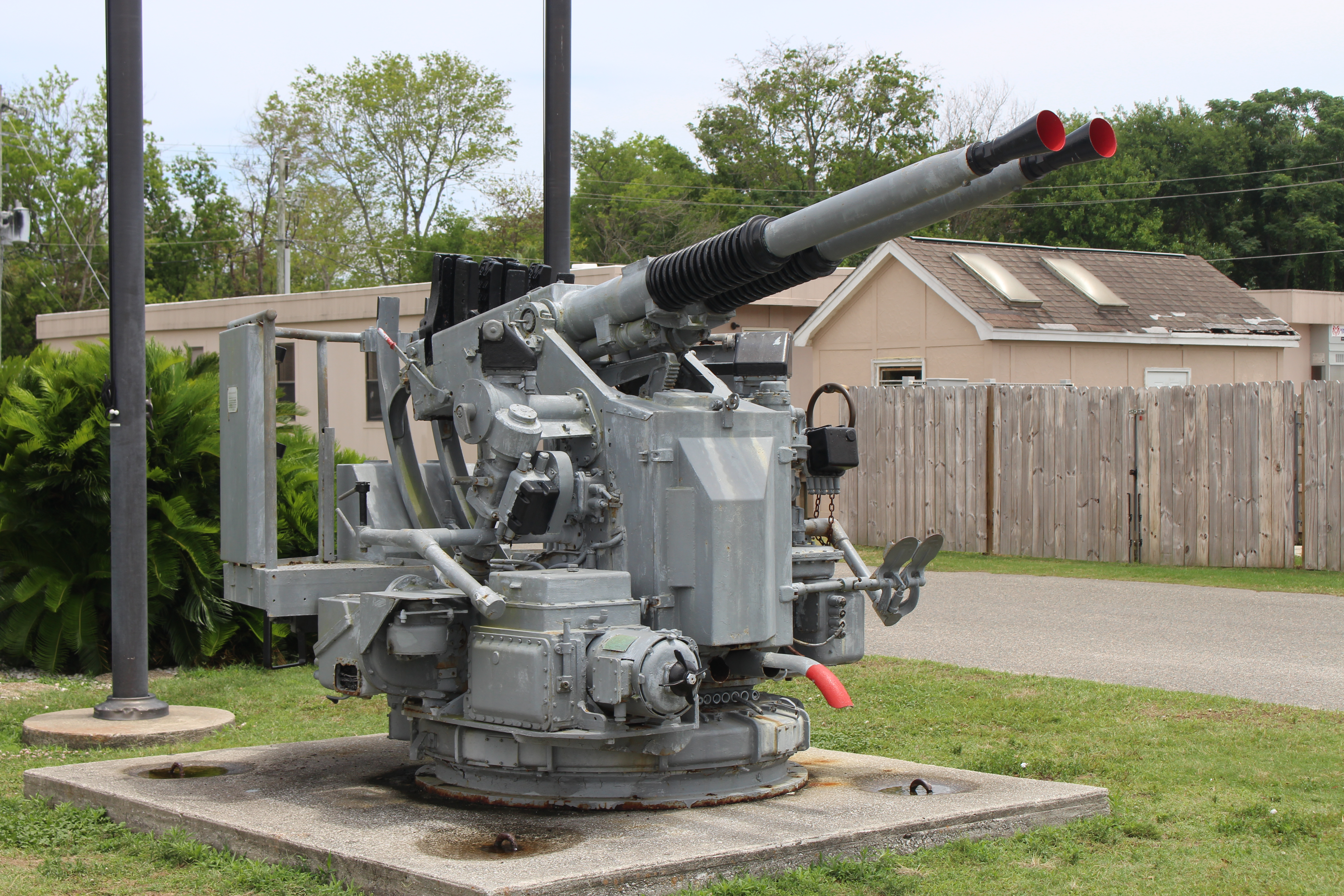
A twin Bofors 40 mm at Patriots Point

Following the attack on Pearl Harbor on 7 December 1941, the existing 1.1" (28 mm) quad mount and .50 caliber machine guns were determined to be inadequate against modern aircraft, and their replacement by 40 mm Bofors and 20 mm Oerlikon weapons was accelerated. The water-cooled version was used almost exclusively by the U.S. Navy and Coast Guard. The 40 mm quadruple mount was developed by essentially mounting two twin mounts side by side. A major improvement was the addition of power operation to both twin and quadruple mounts. Essentially all US naval mountings were twin or quadruple. 40 mm weapons were eventually mounted on virtually every naval and armed auxiliary vessel larger than a small landing craft. After the war, the 3"/50 caliber gun Mark 27 twin mount began to replace the Bofors, because the "VT" proximity fuse would not fit a 40mm projectile, and the 40 mm weapon was considered inadequate against the emerging anti-ship missile threat. The twin 3" mount was intended to be the same weight as the 40mm quad mount, but was somewhat heavier in practice, which had to be compensated for. Except on destroyers and new construction, the Navy was slow in phasing out the 40 mm gun, and it continued in active Navy service through the Korean War. It remained on inactive Reserve fleet ships at least through the early 1970s.

The Navy's satisfaction with the weapons was demonstrated by their practice of telegraphing Chrysler Corporation with the serial numbers of guns when they shot down an aircraft.

=== Army ===
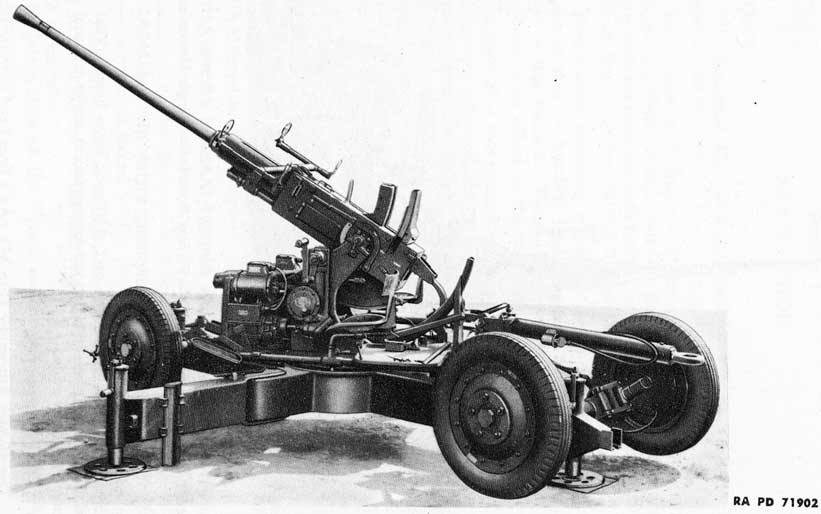
U.S. Army 40 mm Automatic Gun, Anti-Aircraft, M1, on 40 mm Gun Carriage M2(A1).

In 1938 the United States Army introduced a 37 mm gun of their own design, but found it to be of limited performance. In early World War II, six British Bofors were imported for testing, along with Kerrison Predictor directors, and they proved to be superior in all areas. By the middle part of the war, most of the 37 mm guns had been replaced by the 40 mm. In U.S. Army and Marine Corps service, the single mount Bofors was known as the 40 mm Automatic Gun M1. The U.S. version of the gun fired three variants of the British Mk. II high-explosive shell as well as the M81A1 armor-piercing round, which was capable of penetrating some 50 mm of homogeneous armor plate at a range of 500 yards. In the Army, each Anti-Aircraft Artillery (AAA) auto-weapons battalion was authorized a total of thirty-two 40 mm guns in its four firing batteries. Each U.S. Marine division had a "special weapons battalion" that included sixteen 40 mm guns; in early 1944 these were replaced with anti-aircraft battalions with twelve 40 mm guns. Marine defense battalions also used the 40 mm gun. All of these unit types also included other AA weapons.

During World War II, the twin mount version of the gun was mounted on an M24 Chaffee tank chassis as the M19 Gun Motor Carriage. In the 1950s, the M41 Walker Bulldog tank was heavily modified into the M42 Duster with the same twin 40 mm mounting. After being largely withdrawn from service in the early 1960s, the M42 was re-introduced beginning in 1966 for the Vietnam War, where it was mostly used for ground fire support. Following the withdrawal from Vietnam in the early 1970s, the M42 was retained in National Guard service until finally retired in 1988.

== Captured examples ==
In World War II Germany, the Wehrmacht used a number of Bofors guns which had been captured in Poland and France. The Kriegsmarine also operated some guns obtained from Norway. In German naval use, the gun was designated the "4 cm FlaK 28", and was variously used aboard individual examples of many different classes of warship, including but not limited to; the cruisers Admiral Hipper and Prinz Eugen toward the end of the war; M1940-class minesweeper; vorpostenboot. Beginning in 1942, several 'S 38 type' schnellboote were equipped with the Flak 28, enabling them to fight against British MGBs and MTBs on equal terms.

Germany also purchased a large number (200+) of Hungarian-made Bofors guns. In return, Hungary received a 75 mm PaK 40 gun for every 4-5 Bofors. The Wehrmacht used Hungarian guns after German occupation of Hungary from late 1944. Most of them were lost during the fights in Budapest and Transdanubia.

Japan captured a number of Bofors guns in Singapore and put them into production as the Type 5.

== Service use ==
=== Bofors 40 mm Automatic Gun L/43 ===
The Bofors 40 mm L/43 is a submarine variant of L/60 with retractable mounting, and using low propellant charge ammunition.

=== Bofors 40 mm Automatic Gun L/60 ===
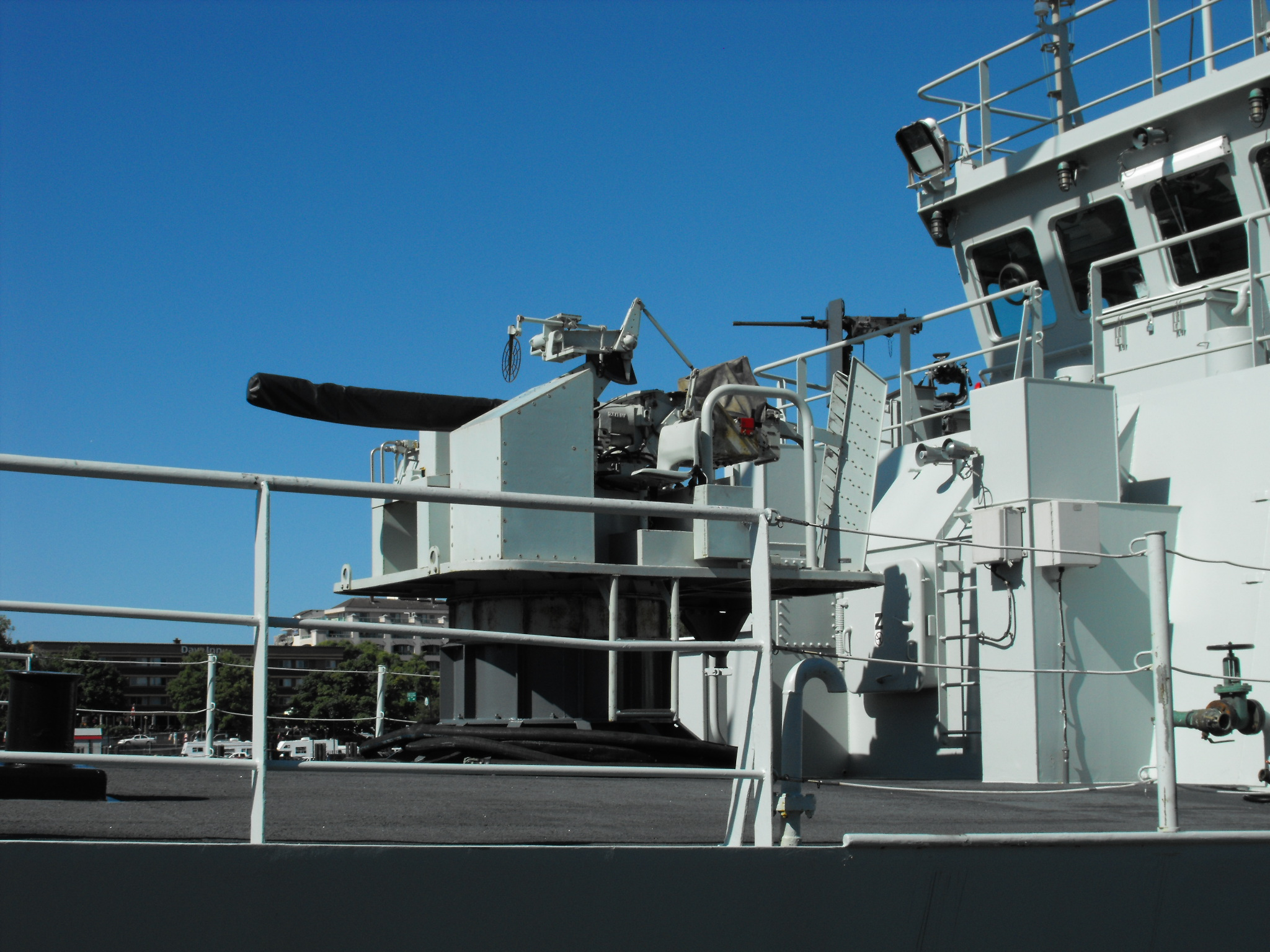
The L/60 Bofors fitted to the Kingston-class coastal defence vessel HMCS Nanaimo

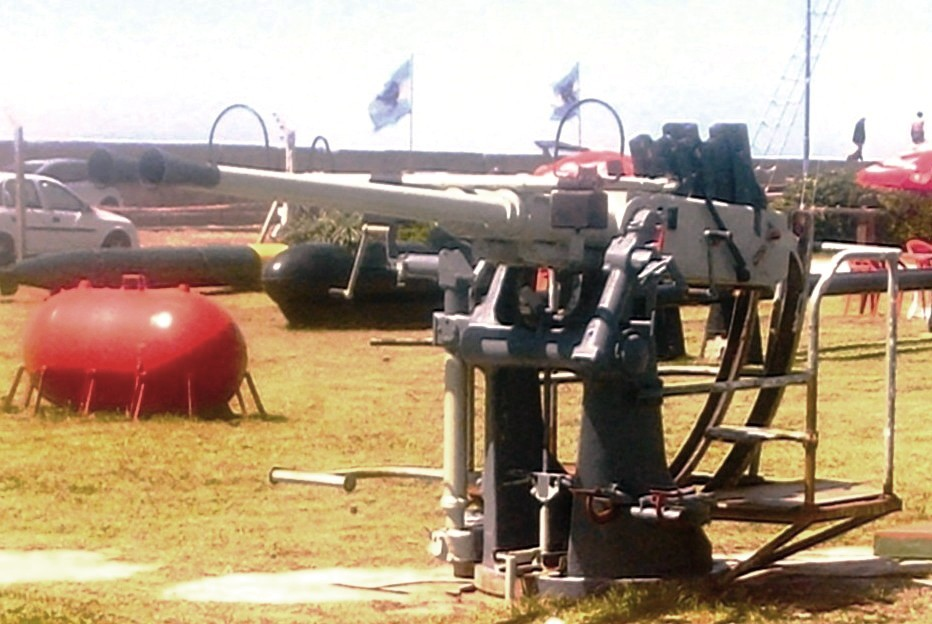
Twin L/60 dismounted from an Argentinian Drummond-class corvette which saw service during the Falklands War

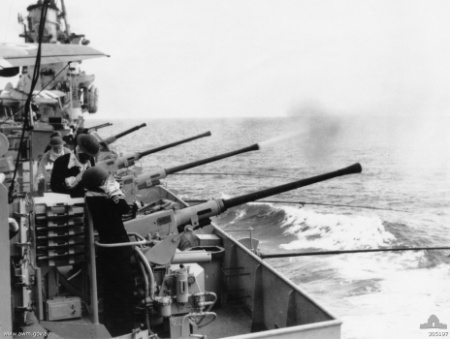
Gunnery practice on the aircraft carrier HMAS Sydney off Korea in 1951

The L/60 remained in front-line service well into the 1980s and 1990s although it had been replaced in production by the Bofors 40 mm Automatic Gun L/70. In most cases, these were the ground anti-aircraft versions, as a suitable replacement in this role did not come along until the introduction of truly effective MANPADS missiles in the 1980s and 1990s.

In United States Army service, the M19 Gun Motor Carriage was replaced by the M42 Duster, using the same turret but based on the chassis of the M41 Walker Bulldog tank.

The L/60 saw active service with the Argentinian and British navies in the 1982 Falklands War and continued to be used into the 1990s, when it was replaced by modern 20 mm and 30 mm artillery.

The Canadian Forces removed the guns from their surface fleet in the late 1980s when they were considered to be outdated, only to re-use old Bofors guns as the main armament of the Kingston-class coastal defence vessel. The Bofors served as the main armament for almost 20 years. The decision to remove them was made in 2014, due to their maintenance burden, and their lack of stabilization.

As of August 2006, the French navy uses L/60s on more than twenty ships (patrols and auxiliaries).

Ships of the Norwegian and Icelandic Coast Guards continue to use the 40mm Bofors gun.

The L/60 continued in use in the Irish Army until recent years, when it was retired in favour of the radar-controlled L/70. The Irish Naval Service P20 class retained L/60s on board as their main weapon until the 1990s but were rearmed with L/70s. The last remaining P20-class patrol vessel, (LÉ Aisling) decommissioned in 2016, was the final vessel fitted with the L/70. Two retired L/60s can be seen adjacent the square in Sarsfield Barracks, Limerick.

The last 40 mm L/60 Bofors in service with the Royal Australian Navy (RAN) were used as the main weapon aboard the Attack-class and Fremantle-class patrol boats and for training purposes at the West Head gunnery range at HMAS Cerberus. These were removed from service during 2007; Bofors were used aboard almost every RAN ship to operate between the 1940s and the 1990s, including the aircraft carriers Sydney and Melbourne.

In 2012, the L/60 was still being used by Brazil, Indonesia, Paraguay, Taiwan, and the United States.

==== AC-130 Gunship ====
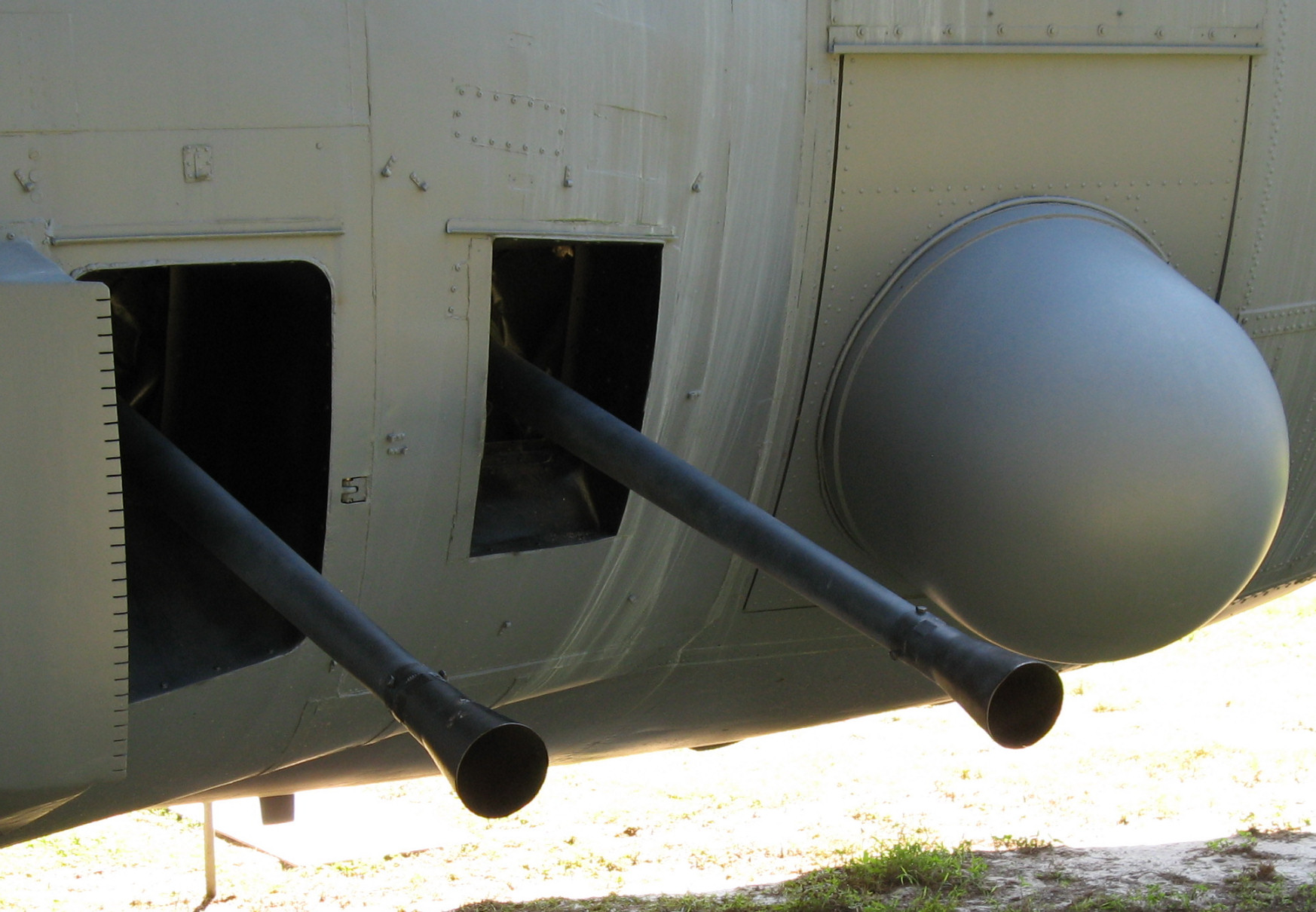
Bofors guns on an AC-130A Spectre gunship

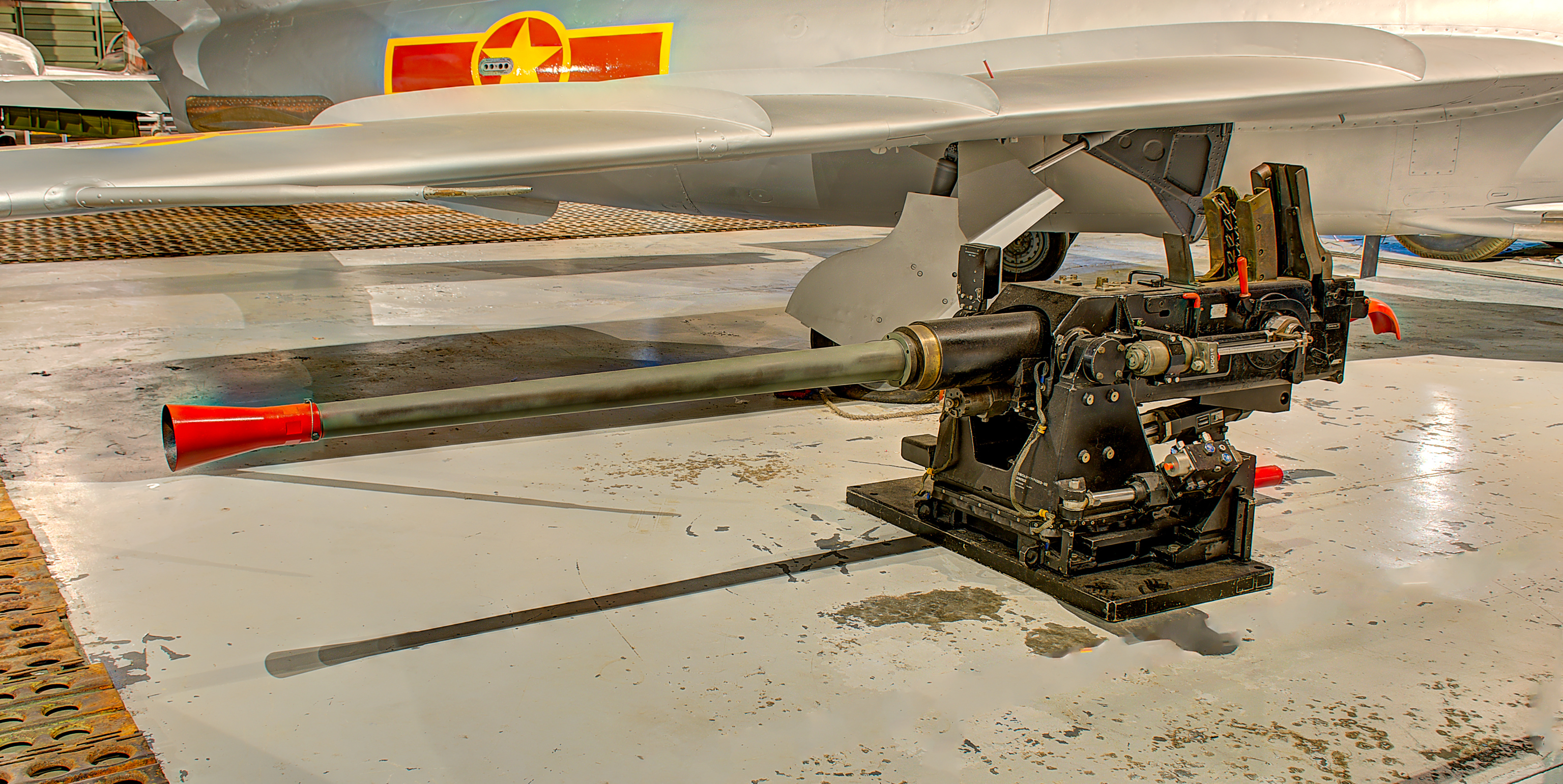
Bofors 40 mm L/60 gun on display at the Museum of Aviation. This gun was mounted in a AC-130U.

Since the beginning of the 1970s, the 40 mm Bofors L/60s have been used in the United States Air Force's Lockheed AC-130 gunships in the air-to-ground role. Between 2006 and 2012, there were plans to remove these and the 20 mm M61 Vulcans from newer AC-130U variants and replace them with 30 mm autocannons. However, these plans did not come to fruition at the time, and the 40 mm Bofors and 20 mm Vulcans remained in service as of 2009, though the later W- and upcoming J-model variants have 30 mm Mk44 Bushmaster II autocannons instead.

When four additional AC-130Us were to be converted from 2002, the necessary 40 mm L/60 guns had to be salvaged from old M42 targets at the Nellis AFB range. The final 40 mm L/60 guns in US service were retired in 2020 with the last of the AC-130Us.

== Manufacturers ==
- AB Bofors (1932–2000)
- MÁVAG (1936–1944)
- Gun Carriage Factory Jabalpur (1960–present)
- Zastava Arms (1970–present)
- United Defense Industries (2000–2006)
- BAE Systems AB (2006–present)
- Valtion Tykkitehdas, modern day Patria Oyj (1936–1945)

== Variants ==
=== Gun variants ===
Swedish variants

- Bofors 40 mm L/60 Model 1932 — Unofficial designation of the prototype gun, made for Swedish Navy's official trials.
  - Bofors 40 mm L/43 Model 1932 — A short-barrel version for submarines that was to be stowed in a waterproof tubular container located in the conning tower or under the decking.
- Bofors 40 mm L/60 Model 1934 — Improved model, exported to several countries but not adopted by the Swedish military.
- Bofors 40 mm L/60 Model 1936 — Slightly further improved model adopted by the Swedish military, as well as other countries.

US variants

- 40 mm L/56 Mark 1 / 40 mm L/56 Mark 2 — US Navy water-cooled variants with interchangeable barrel assemblies. (Note: The Mark 1 was a left-hand weapon, while the Mark 2 was a right-hand weapon. Except for the barrel assemblies, the components were not interchangeable.) Both were used for all twin and quad mountings.
- 40 mm L/56 M1 — US Army air-cooled version. Barrel assemblies were interchangeable with British and Canadian Bofors guns. US Navy used a modified version for single mountings.

=== Carriage variants ===
US variants

== Users ==
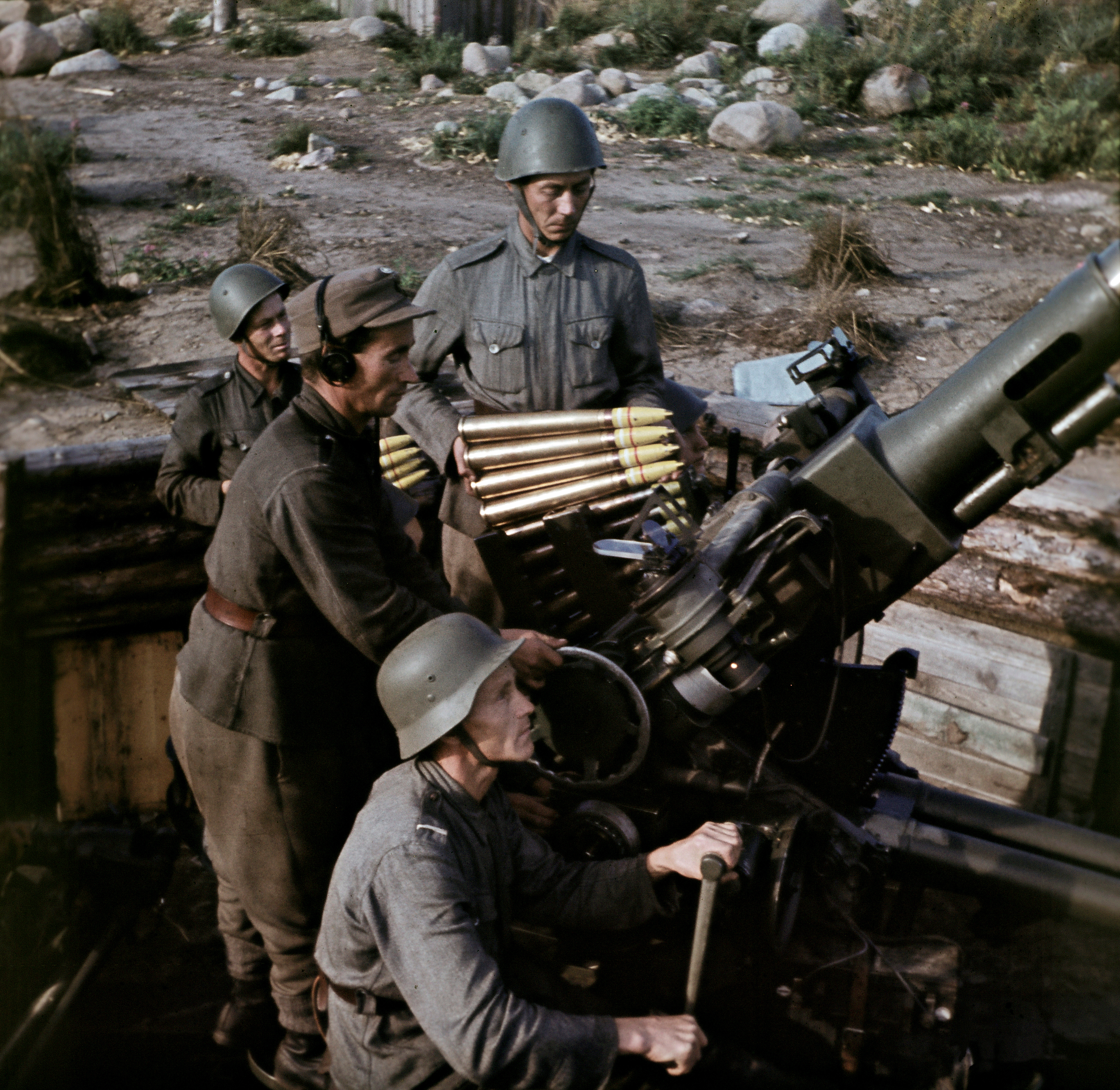
Finnish soldiers operating the Bofors 40 mm gun during the Continuation War.

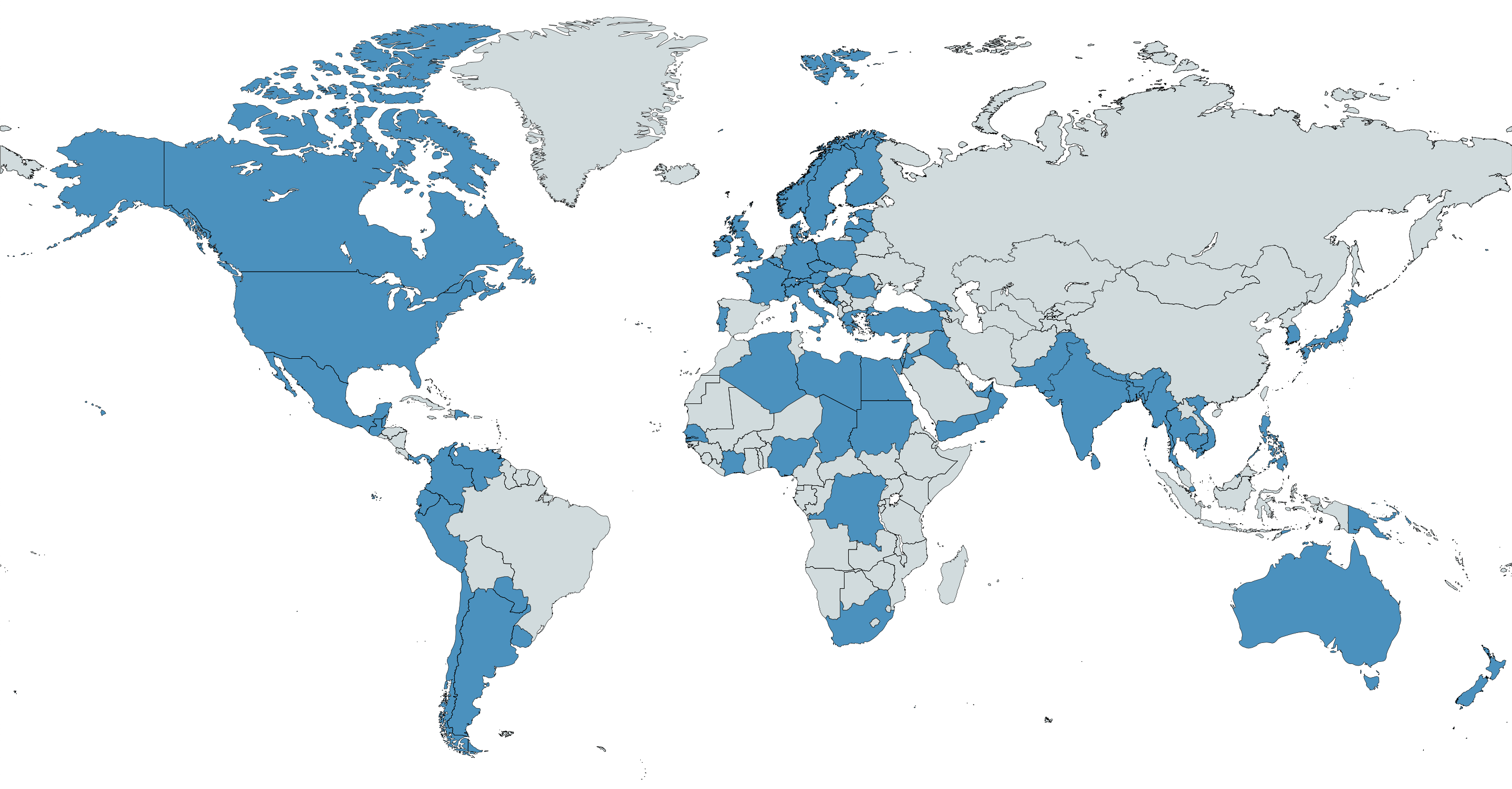
Map with users of the L/60 in blue

- Algeria
- Argentina
- Australia
- Austria
- Bangladesh
- Belgium
- Bosnia and Herzegovina
- Belize
- Brunei
- Cambodia
- Canada — L/60 Bofors (Boffin) used by the Royal Canadian Navy on 12 Kingston-class coastal defence vessels
- Chad
- Chile
- Croatia
- Colombia — M1A1 Bofors
- Democratic Republic of the Congo — L/60
  - Katanga — Known as Beaufort
- Cyprus — M1 Bofors
- Czech Republic
- Denmark — Obtained manufacturing licenses during the 1930s for the L/60, but production never started. After World War II, Bofors L/60 guns were obtained.
- Dominican Republic
- Ecuador — M1A1
- Egypt
- Estonia — Used by the air defence artillery group and on submarines
- Finland — L/60 built under license before WW2
- France
- Gambia
- Germany (Nazi) — Used captured examples as the 4 cm FlaK 28.
- Germany
- Georgia — Used on Coast Guard ships and vessels
- Guatemala
- Greece (1935–1973) — Obtained manufacturing licenses during the 1930s, but production never started. M1 Bofors also used.
- Greece — M1 Bofors.
- Hungary — L/60 built under license as the 4 cm 36M Légvédelmi Gépágyú (4 cm 36M Anti-Aircraft Machine Gun). Also used to armed 40M Nimród SPAAG.
- Iceland
- India
- Israel
- Ireland — Taken out of use in 2016 on decommissioning of last naval vessel using it.
- Iraq
- Italy — Bofors M1 used under designation Cannone contraereo 40/60.
- Ivory Coast
- Japan
- Jordan
- Republic of Korea — L/60 and M1 variants
- Lebanon
- Libya
- Latvia
- Lithuania
- Malaysia
- Mexico
- Malta
- Montenegro
- Myanmar — M1 Bofors
- Nepal — 2 L/60 guns
- Nicaragua — 6 to 8 M1A1 guns
- Nigeria

- Biafra — Used guns captured from Nigerian Army.

- Norway — L/60 built under license before WW2, Bofors M1
- New Zealand
- Oman
- Pakistan
- Panama
- Papua New Guinea
- Paraguay — M1A1 and L/60
- Peru — 24 Bofors L/60, originally ordered by Spain but not delivered due to the civil war.
- Philippines
- Poland — L/60 built under license as 40-mm armata przeciwlotnicza Bofors wz. 36
- Portugal — M1
- Qatar
- Romania — 54 pieces delivered by Germany during the first half of World War II
- Senegal
- Singapore
- Sudan
- South Africa
- South Korea
- Sri Lanka
- Sweden
- Switzerland
- Thailand — M1
- Timor-Leste
- Turkey — M1, L/60
- United Arab Emirates
- United Kingdom — L/60 built under license
- United States — L/60 built under license
- Soviet Union — 5,000 delivered via Lend Lease
- Uruguay
- South Vietnam
- Vietnam
- Venezuela — M1A1
- Yemen

== Wars ==
- Spanish Civil War
- Second World War
- First Indochina War
- Indo-Pakistani wars and conflicts
- Arab–Israeli conflict
- Korean War
- Indonesia–Malaysia confrontation
- 1958 Lebanon crisis
- Portuguese Colonial War
- Congo Crisis
- Eritrean War of Independence
- Vietnam War
- Cambodian Civil War
- Nigerian Civil War
- Yom Kippur War
- Ethiopian Civil War
- South African Border War
- Falklands War
- Lebanese Civil War
- Nicaraguan Revolution
- Gulf War
- Yugoslav wars
- Yemeni Civil War (2015–present)
- Saudi Arabian-led intervention in Yemen
- 2022 Russian invasion of Ukraine
- 2025 Cambodia-Thailand conflict

== See also ==
- Bofors 40 mm Automatic Gun L/70
- List of anti-aircraft guns
- List of naval anti-aircraft guns
- The Bofors Gun – 1968 movie about British airmen in Germany (the gun serves as a framing device)
