= HNLMS O 13 =

O 12-class submarine of the Royal Netherlands Navy

Coordinates: 8°40′N 111°40′E

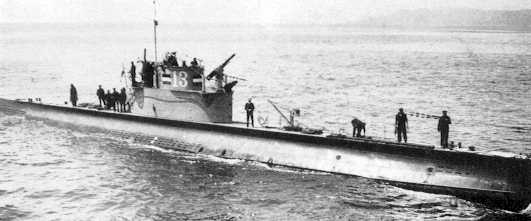
- O 13

History

Netherlands
- Name: O 13
- Builder: Koninklijke Maatschappij De Schelde, Vlissingen
- Laid down: 1 December 1928
- Launched: 18 April 1931
- Commissioned: 1 October 1931
- Fate: Missing after 12 June 1940

General characteristics
- Class & type: O 12-class submarine
- Displacement: 610 tons surfaced; 754 tons submerged
- Length: 60.4 m (198 ft 2 in)
- Beam: 6.8 m (22 ft 4 in)
- Draught: 3.6 m (11 ft 10 in)
- Propulsion: 2 × 900 bhp (671 kW) diesel engines; 2 × 310 bhp (231 kW) electric motors
- Speed: 16 kn (30 km/h; 18 mph) surfaced; 8 kn (15 km/h; 9.2 mph) submerged
- Range: 10,000 nmi (19,000 km; 12,000 mi) at 12 kn (22 km/h; 14 mph) on the surface; 28 nmi (52 km; 32 mi) at 8.5 kn (15.7 km/h; 9.8 mph) submerged
- Complement: 29-31
- Armament: 4 × 21 inch bow torpedo tubes; 1 × 21 inch stern torpedo tube; 2 × 44 mm guns; 1 × 12.7 mm machine gun

O 13 was an O 12-class submarine of the Royal Netherlands Navy that saw service during World War II. She was built by the Koninklijke Maatschappij De Schelde of Vlissingen. She was one of many Dutch ships doing convoy duty during the Spanish Civil War. At the time of the German invasion of the Netherlands, O 13 was on patrol off the Dutch coast and was attacked by German planes on multiple occasions. After fleeing to England, the submarine was lost during a patrol on the North Sea.

== Service history ==
=== Before World War II ===
O 13 ran into a fishing boat, HD 7, from Den Helder in the Schulpengat on 26 September 1933, sinking HD 7. With sister ship O 15, O 13 attended the Brussels International Exposition in 1935. Later that year O 13, with the Dutch vessels O 12, O 15, Hertog Hendrik, Van Ghent, Kortenaer and Z 5, sailed around the North Sea, stopping at Gothenburg and Oslo. In 1937 O 13 did convoy duty in the Strait of Gibraltar during the Spanish Civil War, along with Hertog Hendrik, Johan Maurits van Nassau, Nautilus, Java and O 15.

=== During World War II ===
During the German attack on the Netherlands in 1940 O 13 patrolled along the Dutch coast and was attacked multiple times by German aircraft. On 10 May 1940, she sailed to England escorted by the minesweeper Jan van Gelder. She arrived in Portsmouth the next day. During the evacuation of Dunkirk and Bordeaux O 13 was on patrol in the English Channel. After the Fall of France O 13 was transferred to the 9th Submarine Flotilla based in Dundee, Scotland, together with the other Dutch submarines O 20, O 21, O 23, and O 24. O 13 sailed on her first patrol from Dundee on 12 June 1940 and disappeared at Skagerrak. The submarine was presumed lost on 22 June 1940.

Since there are no German records about O 13 having been sunk it is assumed that the submarine ran into a mine, a distinct possibility since O 13 was patrolling in an area known to have been mined, possibly the same minefield where the Polish submarine ORP Orzeł was lost. One other possibility is that O 13 was rammed by the Polish submarine ORP Wilk, which reported running into an unidentified submarine on 20 June at 0.25 am, but that submarine allegedly had a deck gun mounted forward of the conning tower and O-13 did not. Moreover, the newest analysis of the Wilk's damages shows the most probable possibility: that it collided with a German minefield protector buoy, rather than a submarine. Searching of the O13 wreck in the area of the Wilk's reported collision was fruitless.

== Monument and memory ==
In September 2009, Dundee International Submarine Memorial was dedicated to the memory of the 296 sailors and commandos who served on submarines operating from there and who did not return, among them the crews of O 13 and O 22. O 22 was located near Norway in 1993. O 13 is referred to as "still on patrol", as it is the last Dutch submarine still to be found, of the seven submarines the Royal Dutch Navy lost in World War II. In September 2012, the Royal Netherlands Navy announced they would renew the search with new, advanced equipment.
