= HNLMS O 12 =

Royal Netherlands Navy submarine

Coordinates: 8°40′N 111°40′E

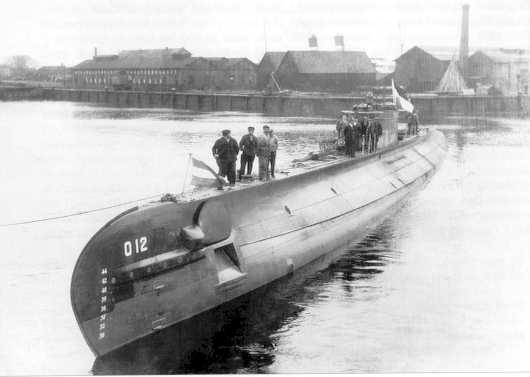
- O 12 after being launched

History

Netherlands
- Name: O 12
- Builder: Koninklijke Maatschappij De Schelde, Vlissingen
- Laid down: 20 October 1928
- Launched: 8 November 1930
- Commissioned: 20 July 1931
- Fate: Scuttled on 14 May 1940, salvaged and taken over by the Kriegsmarine

Nazi Germany
- Name: UD-2
- Commissioned: 30 January 1943
- Decommissioned: 6 July 1944
- Fate: Scuttled on 3 May 1945

General characteristics
- Class & type: O 12-class submarine
- Displacement: 548 long tons (557 t) (surfaced); 715 long tons (726 t) (submerged)
- Length: 198 ft 3 in (60.4 m)
- Beam: 18 ft 6 in (5.6 m)
- Draft: 11 ft 9 in (3.6 m)}
- Propulsion: 2 × 900 bhp (671 kW) diesel engines; 2 × 300 bhp (224 kW) electric motors
- Speed: 15 knots (28 km/h; 17 mph) (surfaced); 8 kn (15 km/h; 9.2 mph) (submerged)
- Range: 3,500 nmi (6,500 km; 4,000 mi) at 10 knots (19 km/h; 12 mph) (surfaced); 12 nmi (22 km; 14 mi) at 8 kn (15 km/h; 9.2 mph) (submerged)
- Test depth: 280 ft (85 m)
- Complement: 31
- Armament: 4 × 21 in (533 mm) bow torpedo tubes; 1 × 17.7 in (450 mm) stern torpedo tubes; 2 × single 40 mm (1.6 in) AA guns

HNLMS O 12 was the lead ship of her class of submarines built for the Royal Netherlands Navy during the 1930s for European service. Completed in 1931, the boat was being overhauled when Germany invaded the Netherlands in 1940 during the Second World War. She was scuttled by the Dutch to prevent her capture, but the boat was salvaged by Nazi Germany's Kriegsmarine and taken into service as UD-2 in 1943. After serving as a training boat, she was scuttled again by the Germans in May 1945.

== Design and description ==
The O 12-class submarines were designed to patrol home waters and were the first Dutch boats to have a uniform armament of 21-inch (530 mm) torpedoes. The boats had a length of 193 feet 3 inches (58.9 m) overall, a beam of 18 feet 6 inches (5.6 m) and a draft of 11 feet 9 inches (3.6 m). They displaced 548 long tons (557 t) on the surface and 715 long tons (726 t) submerged. The submarines had a crew of 31 officers and enlisted men.

For surface running, the boats were powered by two 900-brake-horsepower (671 kW) diesel engines, each driving one propeller shaft. When submerged each propeller was driven by a 300-horsepower (224 kW) electric motor. They could reach 15 knots (28 km/h; 17 mph) on the surface and 8 knots (15 km/h; 9.2 mph) underwater. On the surface, the boats had a range of 3,500 nautical miles (6,500 km; 4,000 mi) at 13 knots (24 km/h; 15 mph) and 12 nmi (22 km; 14 mi) at 8 knots (15 km/h; 9.2 mph) submerged. The submarines had a diving depth of 280 feet (85 m).

The O 12 class was armed with five 21-inch torpedo tubes. Four of these were in the bow and one in the stern. They were also armed with two 40-millimeter (1.6 in) Bofors AA guns; these were on single watertight mounts that retracted into the conning tower when submerged.

== Construction and career ==
O 12 was ordered on 4 October 1927 and laid down on 28 October 1928 at the shipyard of Koninklijke Maatschappij De Schelde in Vlissingen. The boat was launched on 8 November 1930 and commissioned on 20 July 1931.

When Germany invaded the Netherlands on 10 May 1940, O 12 was being overhauled at Willemsoord, Den Helder, and had to be scuttled to prevent her capture intact on 14 May. The Germans refloated the submarine and sent her to the Wilton-Fijenoord shipyard in Rotterdam to be repaired. On 30 January 1943, she was taken into service by the Kriegsmarine as UD-2. After serving as a training boat, she was taken out of service on 6 July 1944 and moved to Kiel, where she was scuttled in the harbor in May 1945. Afterwards, UD-2 was raised and demolished.

== Bibliography ==
- Bagnasco, Erminio (2018) [1977]. Submarines of World War Two: Design, Development and Operations. Naval Institute Press. ISBN 978-1-68247-384-9.
- Lenton, H.T. (1968). Royal Netherlands Navy. Navies of the Second World War. Macdonald & Co.
- Mark, Chris (1997). Schepen van de Koninklijke Marine in W.O. II (in Dutch). Alkmaar: De Alk. ISBN 90-6013-522-9.
- Noppen, Ryan K. (2020). The Royal Netherlands Navy of World War II. New Vanguard. Vol. 285. Osprey Publishing. ISBN 978-1-4728-4191-9.
- Roberts, John (1980). "The Netherlands". In Chesneau, Roger (ed.). Conway's All the World's Fighting Ships 1922–1946. Conway Maritime Press. pp. 385–396. ISBN 0-85177-146-7.
- van Willigenburg, Henk (2010). Dutch Warships of World War II. Lanasta. ISBN 978-90-8616-318-2.
