= ARA Almirante Brown (C-1) =

1929 Almirante Brown-class heavy cruiser

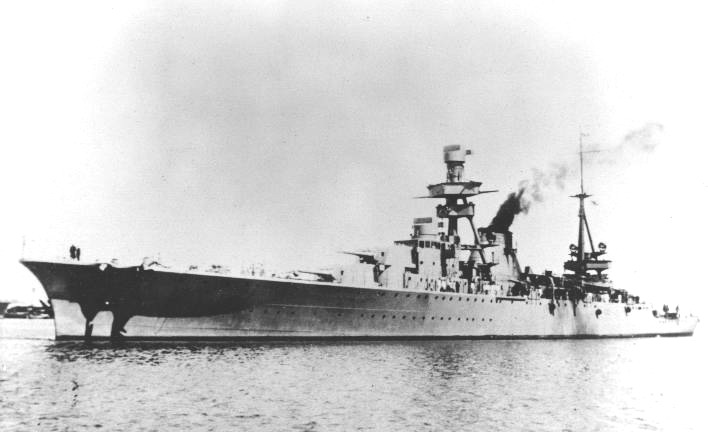

History

Argentina
- Name: Almirante Brown
- Namesake: Guillermo Brown
- Builder: Cantieri navali Odero, Genoa-Cantiere della Foce
- Laid down: 12 October 1927
- Launched: 28 September 1929
- Commissioned: 18 July 1931
- Identification: C-1
- Fate: Scrapped 1962

General characteristics
- Class & type: Veinticinco de Mayo-class cruiser
- Displacement: 6,800t normal; 9,000t full load
- Length: 560.3 ft (170.8 m)
- Beam: 58.5 ft (17.8 m)
- Draught: 15.3 ft (4.7 m)
- Installed power: 85,000 hp (63,000 kW)
- Propulsion: Parsons turbine, 2 screws
- Speed: 32 knots (59 km/h)
- Range: 8,000 nmi (15,000 km) at 14 knots (26 km/h)
- Complement: 600
- Armament: 6 × 190 mm (7.5 inch)/52 caliber guns (3 × 2); 12 × 102 mm (4 inch)/45 caliber DP guns (6 × 2); 6 × Vickers-Terni 40/39 mm AA guns; 6 × 533 mm (21-inch) torpedo tubes
- Armour: Deck: 1 in (25 mm); Sides: 2.8 in (71 mm); Conning tower: 2.3 in (58 mm); Turrets: 2 in (51 mm)
- Aircraft carried: 2 × Grumman J2F Duck
- Aviation facilities: Catapult launcher

Almirante Brown was a Veinticinco de Mayo-class heavy cruiser in service with the Argentine Navy. The ship was named in honour of Admiral Guillermo Brown, the Father of the Argentine Navy.

== Construction and Career ==
Almirante Brown was built by Odero in Genoa (Italy), laid down 27 November 1927, launched on 11 August 1929, and completed 11 July 1931. Her total displacement was 6,800 tons. The ship was broadly similar to the Italian Trento class but was armed with three twin 7.5 in (190 mm) gun turrets as against four twin 8-inch (200 mm) guns. Another important difference was the repositioning of the boilers, which gave the ship a single funnel. On trials the cruiser reached its contracted speed of 32 knots (59 km/h). As completed the ship had a short funnel but it was subsequently raised. During the Second World War the ship finally received the catapult which had been included in the original design. The catapult and crane were carried on the centreline between the funnel and mainmast, with two Grumman floatplanes. When built six single 100 mm (3.9 in) anti-aircraft guns were mounted at forecastle deck level but these were later replaced by twin 40 mm (1.6 in) Bofors guns.

ARA Corrientes collided with ARA Almirante Brown in the fog during naval exercises and sank on 3 October 1941, 54 nm northeast of Mar del Plata.

Almirante Brown was decommissioned on 27 June 1961 and sold for breaking up in Italy in 1962.

== See also ==
- List of ships of the Argentine Navy
