= List of ship commissionings in 1939 =

The list of ship commissionings in 1939 includes a chronological list of ships commissioned in 1939. In cases where no official commissioning ceremony was held, the date of service entry may be used instead.

Date	Operator	Ship	Class and type	Notes	Ref
2 February	Polish Navy	Orzeł	Orzeł-class submarine		
4 February	Kriegsmarine	U-52	Type VIIB submarine		
4 February	Kriegsmarine	U-58	Type IIC submarine		
11 February	Kriegsmarine	U-40	Type IX submarine		
4 March	Kriegsmarine	U-59	Type IIC submarine		
16 April	Polish Navy	Sęp	Orzeł-class submarine		
22 April	Kriegsmarine	U-41	Type IX submarine		
22 April	Kriegsmarine	U-48	Type VIIB submarine		
29 April	Kriegsmarine	Admiral Hipper	Admiral Hipper-class cruiser		
30 April	Kriegsmarine	UA	submarine	ex-Batiray seized from the Turkish Navy during construction	
24 June	Kriegsmarine	U-53	Type VIIB submarine		
3 July	Royal Netherlands Navy	O 19	O 19-class submarine		
15 July	Kriegsmarine	U-42	Type IX submarine		
22 July	Kriegsmarine	U-60	Type IIC submarine		
1 August	Kriegsmarine	U-61	Type IIC submarine		
12 August	Kriegsmarine	U-49	Type VIIB submarine		
26 August	Kriegsmarine	U-43	Type IX submarine		
28 August	Royal Netherlands Navy	O 20	O 19-class submarine		
5 August	Kriegsmarine		light seaplane carrier		
20 September	Kriegsmarine	Blücher	Admiral Hipper-class cruiser		
23 September	Kriegsmarine	U-54	Type VIIB submarine		
30 September	United States Navy	Aaron Ward	Wickes-class destroyer	recommissioned to establish the Neutrality Patrol	
September (unknown date)	Kriegsmarine	Preußen	Vorpostenboot	converted fishing trawler	
2 October	Royal Navy	Hospital Ship No 28	hospital ship	converted ferry, ex-Dinard of the Southern Railway Co	
12 October	Kriegsmarine	Schwabenland	seaplane tender	converted merchant ship	
4 November	Kriegsmarine	U-44	Type IX submarine		
4 December	United States Navy	Abel P. Upshur	Clemson-class destroyer	recommissioned from reserve at Philadelphia Navy Yard for Neutrality Patrol	
12 December	Kriegsmarine	U-50	Type VIIB submarine		
16 December	Kriegsmarine	U-64	Type IXB submarine		
21 December	Kriegsmarine	U-62	Type IIC submarine		
unknown date	Kriegsmarine	Ostmark	seaplane tender	civilian type	
