= U54 =

U54 may refer to:

- German submarine U-54, various vessels
- Great icosidodecahedron
- Small nucleolar RNA SNORD54
