= HNLMS O 21 =

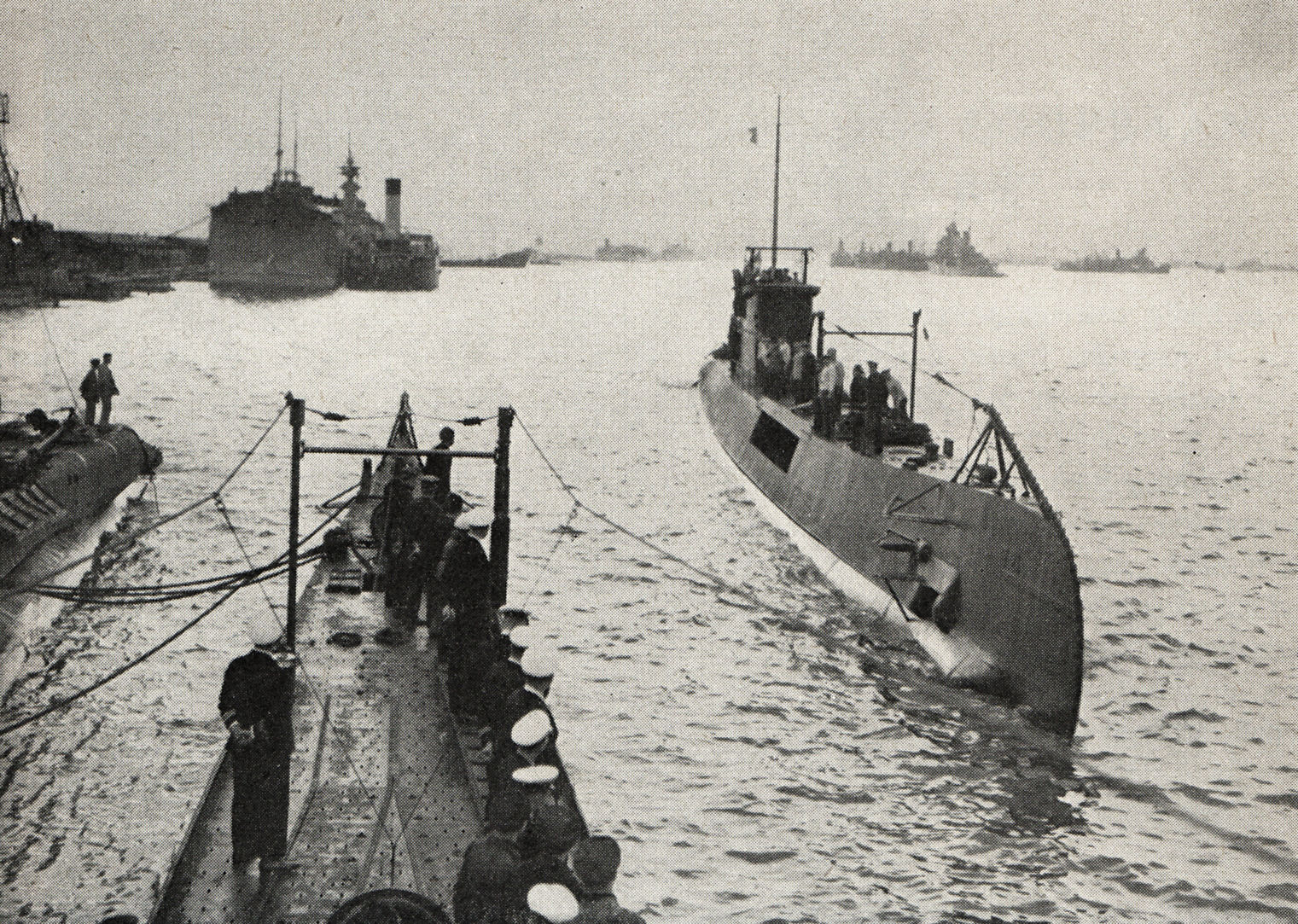
- O 21

History

Netherlands
- Name: O 21
- Builder: Koninklijke Maatschappij De Schelde, Vlissingen
- Laid down: 20 November 1937
- Launched: 21 October 1939
- Commissioned: 10 May 1940
- Decommissioned: 2 November 1957
- Fate: Sold for scrap, 24 January 1958

General characteristics
- Class & type: O 21-class submarine
- Displacement: 987 long tons (1,003 t) (surfaced); 1,488 long tons (1,512 t) (submerged)
- Length: 255 ft (77.7 m)
- Beam: 21 ft 6 in (6.6 m)
- Draft: 13 ft (4.0 m)}
- Propulsion: 2 × 2,500 bhp (1,864 kW) diesel engines; 2 × 500 bhp (373 kW) electric motors
- Speed: 19.5 knots (36.1 km/h; 22.4 mph) (surfaced); 9 kn (17 km/h; 10 mph) (submerged)
- Range: 10,000 nmi (19,000 km; 12,000 mi) at 11 knots (20 km/h; 13 mph) (surfaced); 28 nmi (52 km; 32 mi) at 9 kn (17 km/h; 10 mph) (submerged)
- Test depth: 330 ft (100 m)
- Complement: 60
- Armament: 4 × 21 in (533 mm) bow torpedo tubes; 2 × 21 in (533 mm) stern torpedo tubes; 2 × 21 in (533 mm) external traversing torpedo tubes; 2 × single 40 mm (1.6 in) AA guns

O 21 was the lead ship of her class of submarines built for the Royal Netherlands Navy during the 1930s for European service. Completed in 1940, she sank several ships during World War II, among them the German submarine U-95.

== Design and description ==
The O 21-class submarines were slightly smaller versions of the preceding O 19 class since they lacked that class's minelaying capability. The boats had a length of 255 feet (77.7 m) overall, a beam of 21 feet 6 inches (6.6 m) and a draft of 13 feet (4.0 m). They displaced 987 long tons (1,003 t) on the surface and 1,488 long tons (1,512 t) submerged. The submarines had a crew of 60 officers and enlisted men.

For surface running, the boats were powered by two 2,500-brake-horsepower (1,864 kW) Sulzer diesel engines, each driving one propeller shaft. When submerged each propeller was driven by a 500-horsepower (373 kW) electric motor. They could reach 19.5 knots (36.1 km/h; 22.4 mph) on the surface and 9 knots (17 km/h; 10 mph) underwater. On the surface, the boats had a range of 10,000 nautical miles (19,000 km; 12,000 mi) at 12 knots (22 km/h; 14 mph) and 28 nmi (52 km; 32 mi) at 9 knots submerged. The submarines had a diving depth of 330 feet (100 m).

The O 21 class was armed with eight 21-inch (533 mm) torpedo tubes. Four of these were in the bow and two tubes were in the stern. The other pair were on an external rotating mount amidships. A reload was provided for each internal torpedo tube. They were also armed with two 40-millimeter (1.6 in) Bofors AA guns; these were on single watertight mounts that retracted into the conning tower when submerged.

== Construction and career ==
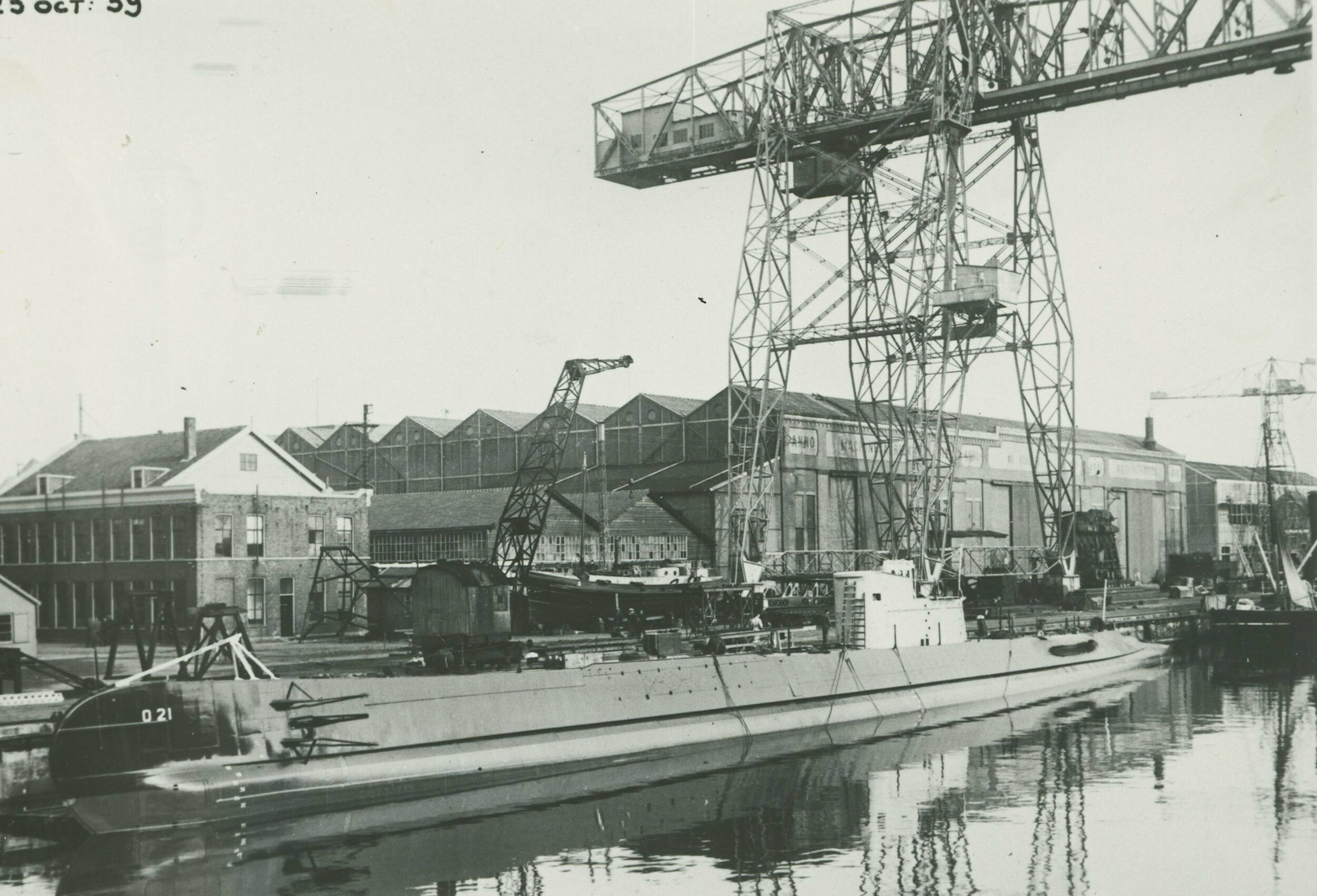
O 21 being readied for sea trials, October 1939

O 21 was ordered on 19 June 1937 and laid down on 20 November 1937 at the shipyard of Koninklijke Maatschappij De Schelde in Vlissingen. The boat was launched on 21 October 1939. Following the German invasion of 10 May 1940, O 21 was hastily commissioned that afternoon, still incomplete, and sailed for England together with her sister O 22 and the tugboat B.V. 37, to be finally completed at Rosyth Dockyard.

During the war she operated around England, the Mediterranean Sea, in the Indian Ocean and Fremantle off the west coast of Australia. O 21 sank U-95 in the western Mediterranean on 28 November 1941. She survived the war and was decommissioned on 2 November 1957 and sold for scrap the following year to the firm v. Beekum in Alkmaar for the price of 141.000 Dutch guilders.

== Bibliography ==
- Bagnasco, Erminio (2018) [1977]. Submarines of World War Two: Design, Development and Operations. Naval Institute Press. ISBN 978-1-68247-384-9.
- Lenton, H.T. (1968). Royal Netherlands Navy. Navies of the Second World War. Macdonald & Co.
- Mark, Chris (1997). Schepen van de Koninklijke Marine in W.O. II (in Dutch). Alkmaar: De Alk. ISBN 90-6013-522-9.
- Noppen, Ryan K. (2020). The Royal Netherlands Navy of World War II. New Vanguard. Vol. 285. Osprey Publishing. ISBN 978-1-4728-4191-9.
- van Willigenburg, Henk (2010). Dutch Warships of World War II. Lanasta. ISBN 978-90-8616-318-2.
