= O19 =

O19 or O-19 may refer to:

- Kneeland Airport, in by Humboldt County, California, United States
- O 19-class submarine, of the Royal Netherlands Navy
  - HNLMS O 19, a submarine of the Royal Netherlands Navy
- Oxygen-19, an isotope of oxygen
- Thomas-Morse O-19, an observation aircraft of the United States Army Air Corps
