= HNLMS O 23 =

O 21-class submarine of the Royal Netherlands Navy

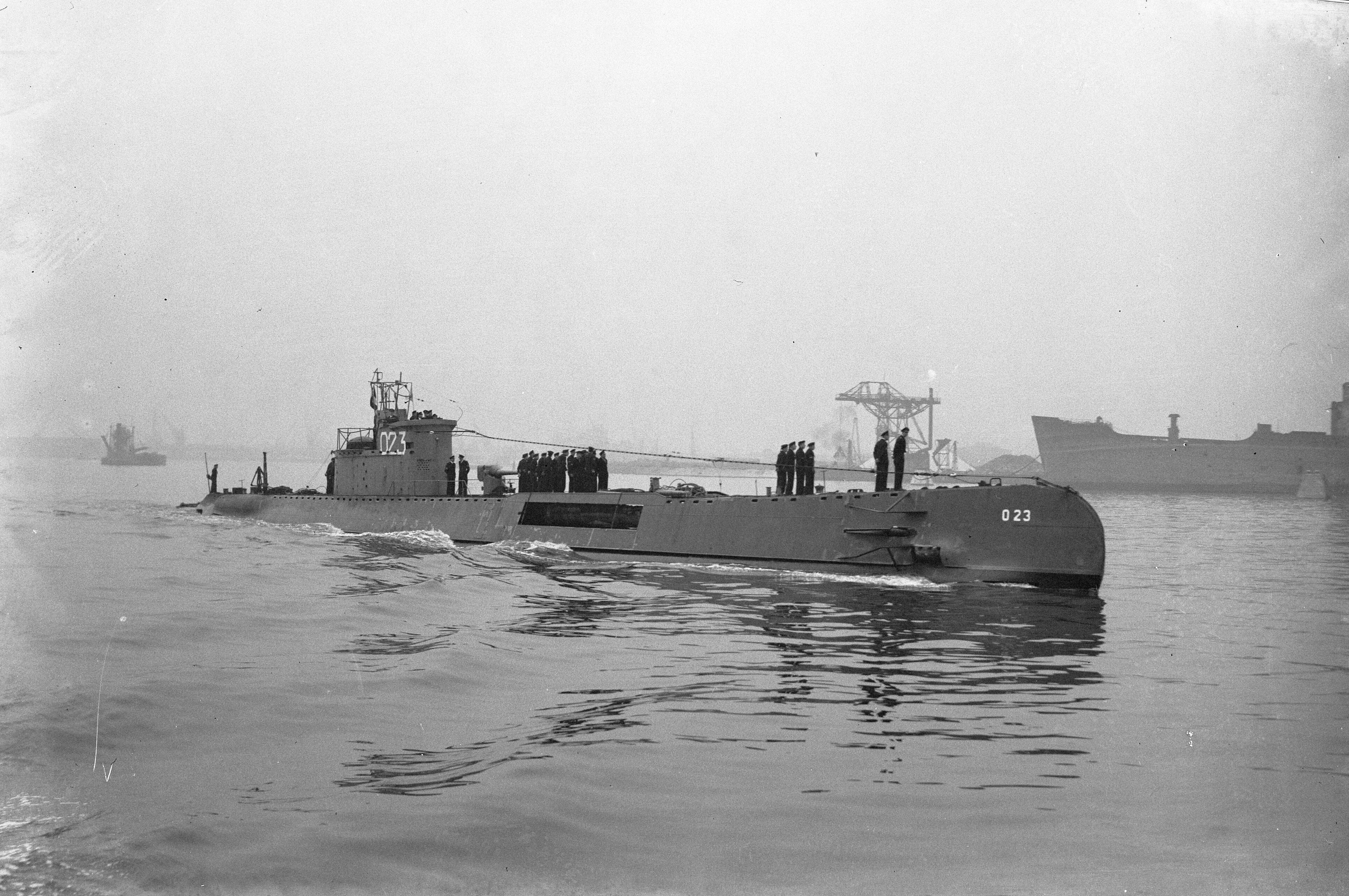
- O 23

History

Netherlands
- Name: O 23
- Builder: Rotterdamsche Droogdok Maatschappij, Rotterdam
- Yard number: RDM-205
- Laid down: 12 October 1937
- Launched: 5 December 1939
- Commissioned: 13 May 1940
- Decommissioned: 1 December 1948
- Fate: Sold for scrap, April 1949

General characteristics
- Class & type: O 21-class submarine
- Displacement: 987 long tons (1,003 t) (surfaced); 1,488 long tons (1,512 t) (submerged)
- Length: 255 ft (77.7 m)
- Beam: 21 ft 6 in (6.6 m)
- Draft: 13 ft (4.0 m)}
- Propulsion: 2 × 2,500 bhp (1,864 kW) diesel engines; 2 × 500 bhp (373 kW) electric motors
- Speed: 19.5 knots (36.1 km/h; 22.4 mph) (surfaced); 9 kn (17 km/h; 10 mph) (submerged)
- Range: 10,000 nmi (19,000 km; 12,000 mi) at 11 knots (20 km/h; 13 mph) (surfaced); 28 nmi (52 km; 32 mi) at 9 kn (17 km/h; 10 mph) (submerged)
- Test depth: 330 ft (100 m)
- Complement: 60
- Armament: 4 × 21 in (533 mm) bow torpedo tubes; 2 × 21 in (533 mm) stern torpedo tubes; 2 × 21 in (533 mm) external traversing torpedo tubes; 2 × single 40 mm (1.6 in) AA guns

O 23 was a O 21-class submarine built for the Royal Netherlands Navy during the 1930s for European service. Completed in 1940, she sank several ships during World War II in the Mediterranean and in the Indian Ocean.

== Design and description ==
The O 21-class submarines were slightly smaller versions of the preceding O 19 class since they lacked that class's minelaying capability. The boats had a length of 255 feet (77.7 m) overall, a beam of 21 feet 6 inches (6.6 m) and a draft of 13 feet (4.0 m). They displaced 987 long tons (1,003 t) on the surface and 1,488 long tons (1,512 t) submerged. The submarines had a crew of 60 officers and enlisted men.

For surface running, the boats were powered by two 2,500-brake-horsepower (1,864 kW) Sulzer diesel engines, each driving one propeller shaft. When submerged each propeller was driven by a 500-horsepower (373 kW) electric motor. They could reach 19.5 knots (36.1 km/h; 22.4 mph) on the surface and 9 knots (17 km/h; 10 mph) underwater. On the surface, the boats had a range of 10,000 nautical miles (19,000 km; 12,000 mi) at 12 knots (22 km/h; 14 mph) and 28 nmi (52 km; 32 mi) at 9 knots submerged. The submarines had a diving depth of 330 feet (100 m).

The O 21 class was armed with eight 21-inch (533 mm) torpedo tubes. Four of these were in the bow and two tubes were in the stern. The other pair were on an external rotating mount amidships. A reload was provided for each internal torpedo tube. They were also armed with two 40-millimeter (1.6 in) Bofors AA guns; these were on single watertight mounts that retracted into the conning tower when submerged.

== Construction and career ==
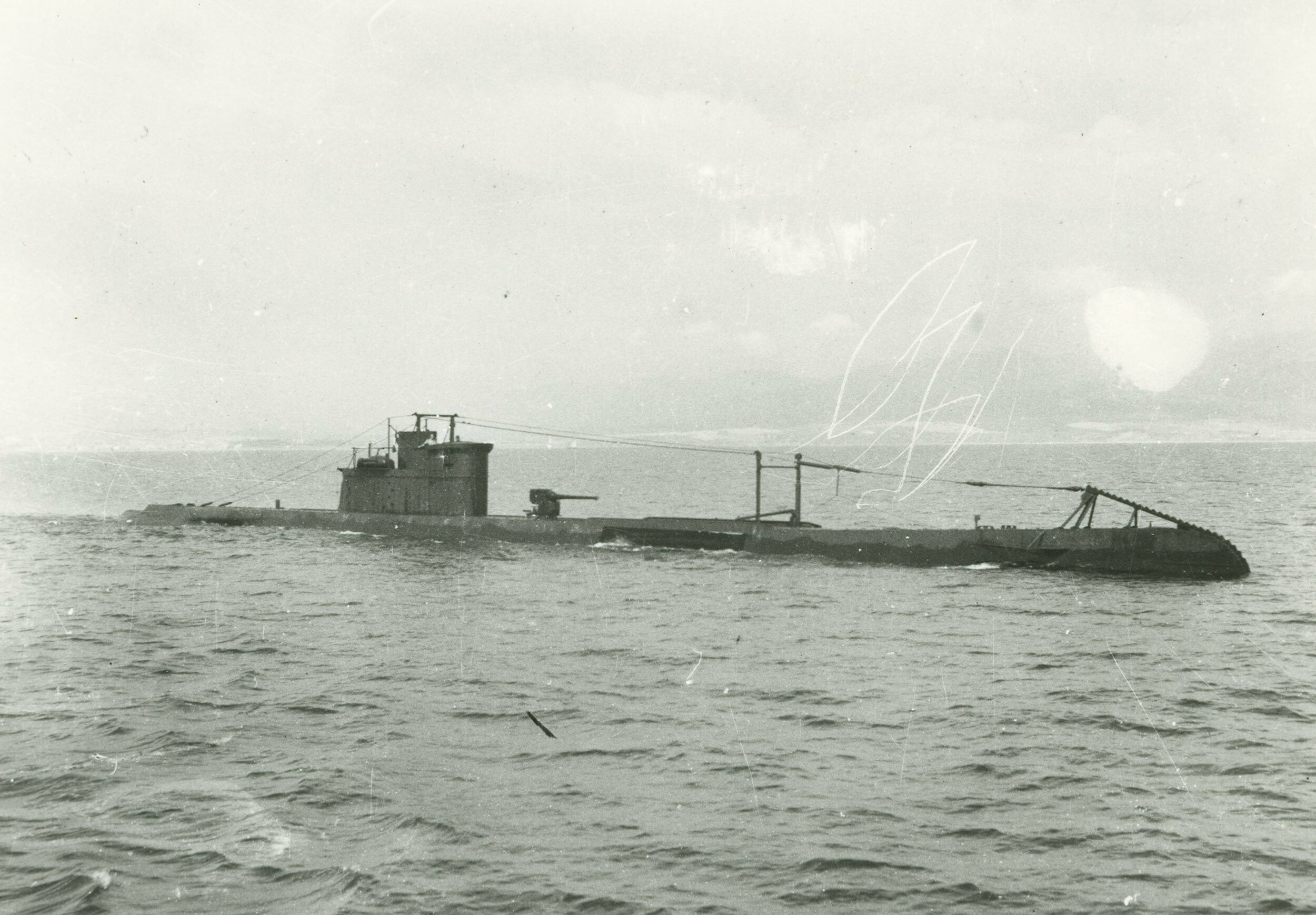
O 23 in the Bay of Gibraltar in 1941

O 23 was ordered on 19 June 1937 and laid down on 12 October 1937 at the shipyard of Rotterdamsche Droogdok Maatschappij in Rotterdam. The boat was launched on 5 December 1939. Following the German invasion of 10 May 1940, O 23 was hastily commissioned, still incomplete, and sailed for England on 13 May, together with her sister O 24, to be completed at the Thornycroft shipyard at Southampton.

During the war she operated in the North Sea, the Mediterranean Sea and the Indian Ocean. O 23 made twenty patrols during the war in the course of which she sank or damaged five ships. She survived the war and was decommissioned on 1 December 1948, being sold for scrap in April of the following year.

== Summary of raiding history ==
Ships sunk and damaged by O 23.

| Date | Ship name | Nationality/Type | Tonnage (GRT) | Fate |
|---|---|---|---|---|
| 30 June 1941 | Capacitas | Italian tanker | 5371 | Sunk |
| 27 July 1942 | Shofuku Maru No.2 | Japanese merchant ship | 729 | Damaged |
| 2 August 1942 | Zenyo Maru | Japanese army cargo ship | 6440 | Damaged (burned out and later declared a total loss) |
| 2 August 1942 | Ohio Maru | Japanese transport ship | 5872 | Sunk |
| 25 October 1942 | Shinyu Maru | Japanese merchant ship | 4622 | Damaged |

== Bibliography ==
- Bagnasco, Erminio (2018) [1977]. Submarines of World War Two: Design, Development and Operations. Naval Institute Press. ISBN 978-1-68247-384-9.
- Lenton, H.T. (1968). Royal Netherlands Navy. Navies of the Second World War. Macdonald & Co.
- Mark, Chris (1997). Schepen van de Koninklijke Marine in W.O. II (in Dutch). Alkmaar: De Alk. ISBN 90-6013-522-9.
- Noppen, Ryan K. (2020). The Royal Netherlands Navy of World War II. New Vanguard. Vol. 285. Osprey Publishing. ISBN 978-1-4728-4191-9.
- van Willigenburg, Henk (2010). Dutch Warships of World War II. Lanasta. ISBN 978-90-8616-318-2.
