= German submarine UD-4 =

German World War II submarine

History

Netherlands
- Name: O 26
- Ordered: 24 June 1938
- Builder: Rotterdamsche Droogdok Maatschappij, Rotterdam
- Yard number: RDM-209
- Laid down: 20 April 1939
- Captured: By Germany, 14 May 1940

Nazi Germany
- Name: UD-4
- Launched: 23 November 1940
- Acquired: 14 May 1940
- Commissioned: 28 January 1941
- Decommissioned: 19 March 1945
- Fate: Scuttled, 3 May 1945

General characteristics
- Class & type: O 21-class submarine
- Displacement: 987 long tons (1,003 t) (surfaced); 1,488 long tons (1,512 t) (submerged)
- Length: 255 ft (77.7 m)
- Beam: 21 ft 6 in (6.6 m)
- Draught: 13 ft (4.0 m)}
- Propulsion: 2 × 2,500 bhp (1,864 kW) diesel engines; 2 × 500 bhp (373 kW) electric motors
- Speed: 19.5 knots (36.1 km/h; 22.4 mph) (surfaced); 9 kn (17 km/h; 10 mph) (submerged)
- Range: 10,000 nmi (19,000 km; 12,000 mi) at 11 knots (20 km/h; 13 mph) (surfaced); 28 nmi (52 km; 32 mi) at 9 kn (17 km/h; 10 mph) (submerged)
- Test depth: 330 ft (100 m)
- Complement: 60
- Armament: 4 × 21 in (533 mm) bow torpedo tubes; 2 × 21 in (533 mm) stern torpedo tubes; 2 × 21 in (533 mm) external traversing torpedo tubes; 2 × 2 cm (0.8 in) AA guns

UD-4 was an O 21-class submarine built for the Royal Netherlands Navy during the 1930s for European service. The boat was captured incomplete during the German invasion of the Netherlands in May 1940 during World War II and was later commissioned into the Kriegsmarine as UD-4. The submarine served as a training boat during the war. She was decommissioned in early 1945 and scuttled in May 1945.

== Design and description ==
The O 21-class submarines were slightly smaller versions of the preceding O 19 class since they lacked that class's minelaying capability. The boats had a length of 255 feet (77.7 m) overall, a beam of 21 feet 6 inches (6.6 m) and a draught of 13 feet (4.0 m). They displaced 987 long tons (1,003 t) on the surface and 1,488 long tons (1,512 t) submerged. The submarines had a crew of 60 officers and enlisted men.

For surface running, the boats were powered by two 2,500-brake-horsepower (1,864 kW) Sulzer diesel engines, each driving one propeller shaft. When submerged each propeller was driven by a 500-horsepower (373 kW) electric motor. They could reach 19.5 knots (36.1 km/h; 22.4 mph) on the surface and 9 knots (17 km/h; 10 mph) underwater. On the surface, the boats had a range of 10,000 nautical miles (19,000 km; 12,000 mi) at 12 knots (22 km/h; 14 mph) and 28 nmi (52 km; 32 mi) at 9 knots submerged. The submarines had a diving depth of 330 feet (100 m).

The O 21 class was armed with eight 21-inch (533 mm) torpedo tubes. Four of these were in the bow and two tubes were in the stern. The other pair were on an external rotating mount amidships. A reload was provided for each internal torpedo tube. UD-4 equipped with two 2-centimetre (0.8 in) Flak 38 AA guns.

== Construction and career ==
The submarine was ordered on 8 July 1938 and laid down on 20 April 1939 as K XXVI at the shipyard of Rotterdamsche Droogdok Maatschappij in Rotterdam. During construction she was renamed O 26. Following the German invasion of 10 May 1940, the incomplete O 26 was captured at the yard by the invading forces. The Kriegsmarine decided to complete her and the launch took place on 23 November. She served in the Kriegsmarine as UD-4 and was commissioned on 28 January 1941, with Korvettenkapitän Helmut Brümmer-Patzig in command.

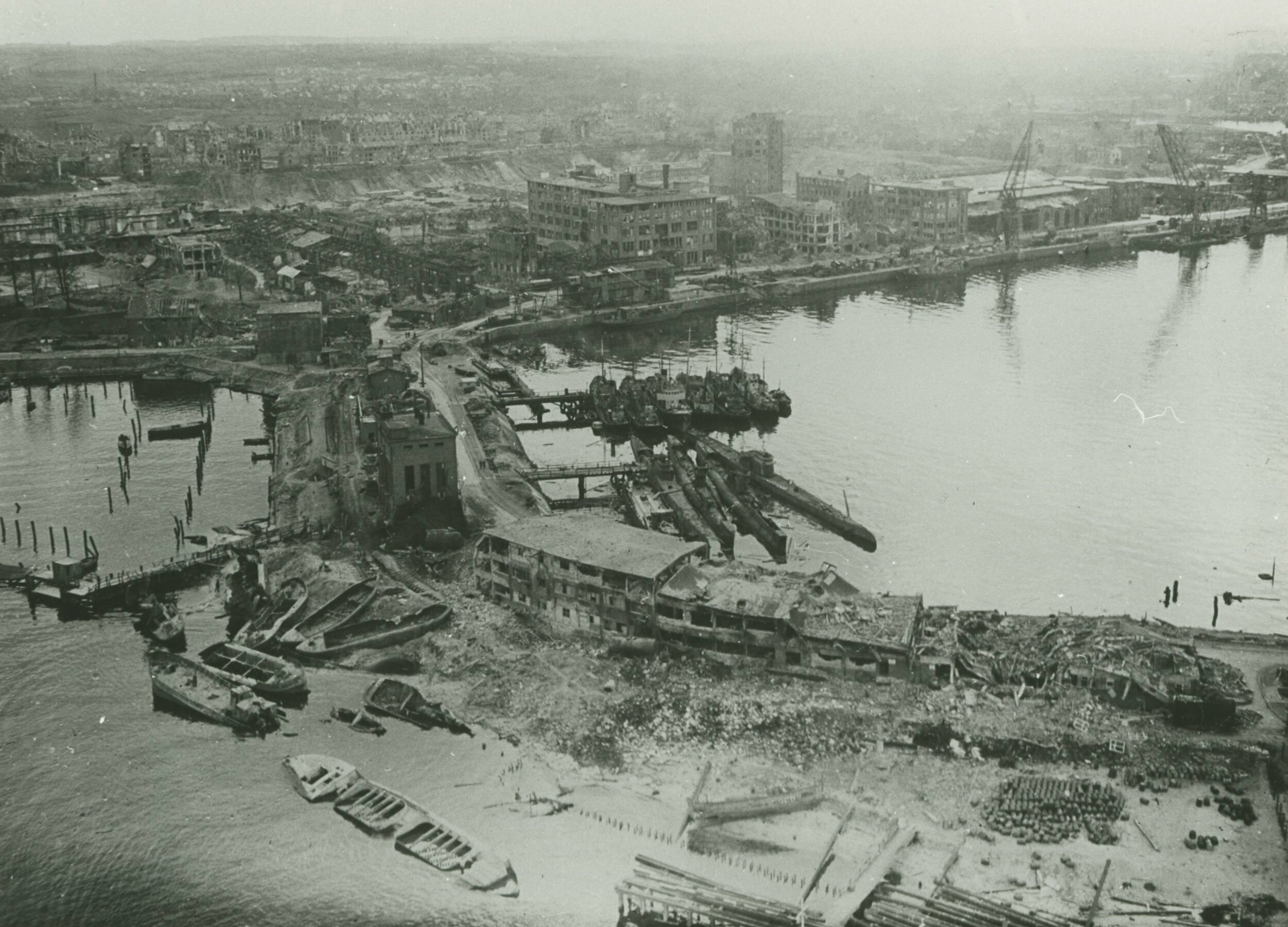
UD-4 among other types in the heavily damaged port of Kiel, April 1945

From January to April 1941, UD-4 served as school boat in Kiel when attached to the 1st Flotilla. In May, she was transferred to the 3rd Flotilla also in Kiel where she was used as a trial boat. She remained there until July that year. In August 1941, the boat was transferred to the 5th Flotilla also in Kiel where she was used as a school boat until December 1942. In January 1943, UD-4 was transferred to Gotenhafen where she served as a school boat for 24th Flotilla and 27th Flotilla until January 1945. From January to March 1945, she was based in Hela and transferred to the 18th Flotilla where she served as a school boat.

On 19 March 1945, UD-4 was decommissioned; she was scuttled in Kiel on 3 May.

== Bibliography ==
- Bagnasco, Erminio (2018) [1977]. Submarines of World War Two: Design, Development and Operations. Naval Institute Press. ISBN 978-1-68247-384-9.
- Busch, Rainer; Röll, Hans-Joachim (1999). German U-boat Commanders of World War II: A Biographical Dictionary. Translated by Brooks, Geoffrey. Greenhill Books, Naval Institute Press. ISBN 978-1-55750-186-8.
- Gröner, Erich; Jung, Dieter & Maass, Martin (1991). German Warships 1815–1945, U-boats and Mine Warfare Vessels. Vol. 2. Conway Maritime Press. ISBN 978-0-85177-593-7.
- Mark, Chris (1997). Schepen van de Koninklijke Marine in W.O. II (in Dutch). Alkmaar: De Alk. ISBN 90-6013-522-9.
- Noppen, Ryan K. (2020). The Royal Netherlands Navy of World War II. New Vanguard. Vol. 285. Osprey Publishing. ISBN 978-1-4728-4191-9.
- van Willigenburg, Henk (2010). Dutch Warships of World War II. Lanasta. ISBN 978-90-8616-318-2.
