= Wriedt =

Wriedt is a surname. Notable people with the surname include:

- Etta Wriedt (1859–1942), American spiritual medium
- Ken Wriedt (1927–2010), Australian politician
- Kwasi Okyere Wriedt (born 1994), Ghanaian footballer
- Paula Wriedt (born 1968), Australian politician

== See also ==
- FV August Wriedt, two fishing vessels carrying the name August Wriedt were requisioned by the Kriegsmarine during World War II.
