= German submarine U-54 =

U-54 may refer to one of the following German submarines:

- SM U-54, a Type U 51 submarine launched in 1916 and that served in the First World War until surrendered 24 November 1918; broken up at Taranto in May 1919
  - During the First World War, Germany also had these submarines with similar names:
    - SM UB-54, a Type UB III submarine launched in 1917 and disappeared after 1 March 1918
    - SM UC-54, a Type UC II submarine launched in 1916 and scuttled on 28 October 1918
- German submarine U-54 (1939), a Type VIIB submarine that served in the Second World War until she went missing after 20 February 1940
