= FV August Wriedt =

Two fishing vessels carrying the name August Wriedt were requisitioned by the Kriegsmarine during World War II.

- FV August Wriedt (1929) later served as a weather ship
- FV August Wriedt (1930) later served as a Vorpostenboot
