= HNLMS O 22 =

Coordinates: 57°55′N 5°31′E

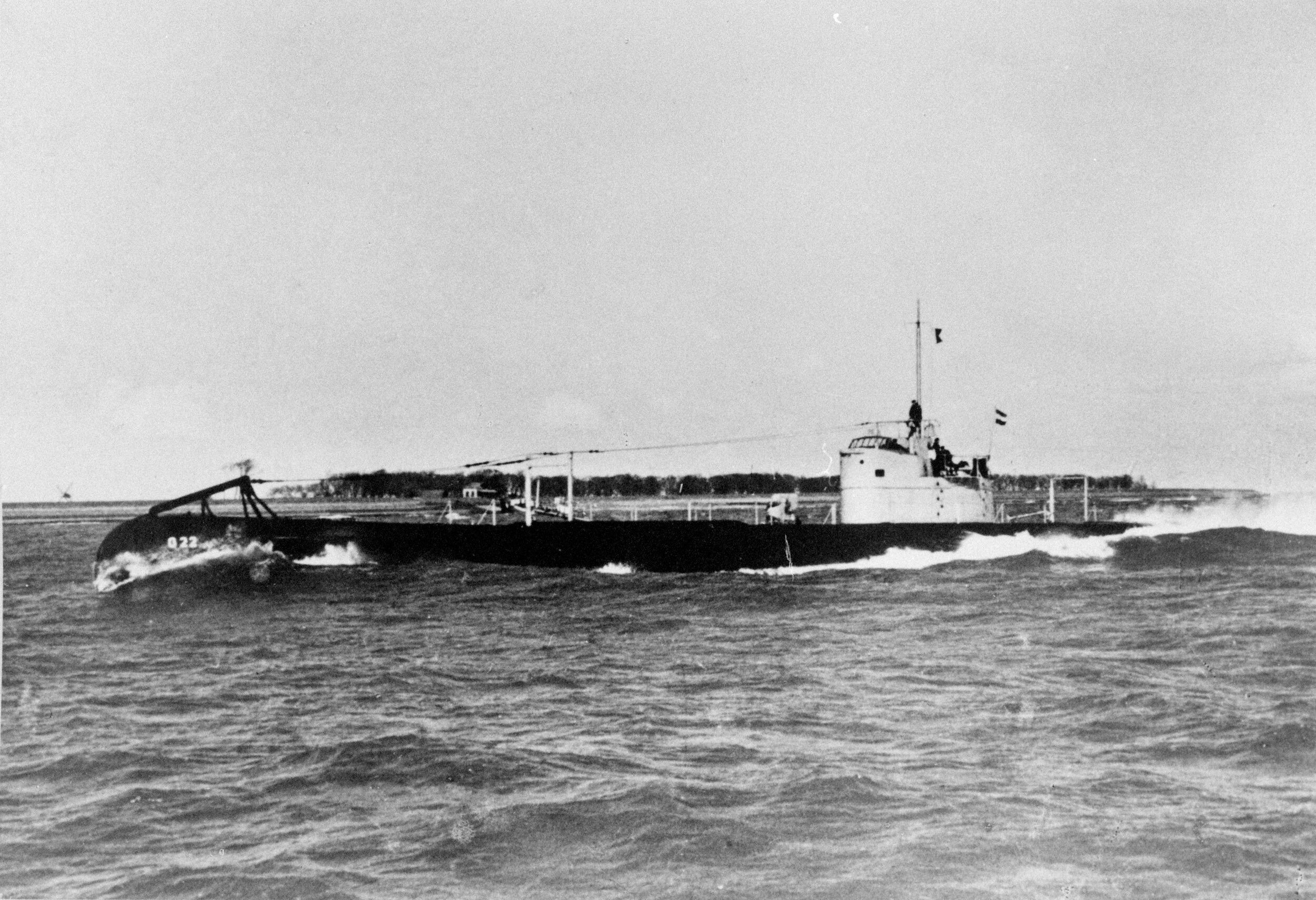
- O 22 in 1940

History

Netherlands
- Name: O 22
- Builder: Koninklijke Maatschappij De Schelde, Vlissingen
- Laid down: 20 November 1937
- Launched: 20 January 1940
- Commissioned: 10 May 1940
- Fate: Lost in 1940

General characteristics
- Class & type: O 21-class submarine
- Displacement: 987 long tons (1,003 t) (surfaced); 1,488 long tons (1,512 t) (submerged)
- Length: 255 ft (77.7 m)
- Beam: 21 ft 6 in (6.6 m)
- Draft: 13 ft (4.0 m)}
- Propulsion: 2 × 2,500 bhp (1,864 kW) diesel engines; 2 × 500 bhp (373 kW) electric motors
- Speed: 19.5 knots (36.1 km/h; 22.4 mph) (surfaced); 9 kn (17 km/h; 10 mph) (submerged)
- Range: 10,000 nmi (19,000 km; 12,000 mi) at 11 knots (20 km/h; 13 mph) (surfaced); 28 nmi (52 km; 32 mi) at 9 kn (17 km/h; 10 mph) (submerged)
- Test depth: 330 ft (100 m)
- Complement: 60
- Armament: 4 × 21 in (533 mm) bow torpedo tubes; 2 × 21 in (533 mm) stern torpedo tubes; 2 × 21 in (533 mm) external traversing torpedo tubes; 2 × single 40 mm (1.6 in) AA guns

O 22 was a O 21-class submarine built for the Royal Netherlands Navy during the 1930s for European service. Completed in 1940, she was lost to unknown causes in late 1940 with all hands. Her wreck was found off the south-western coast of Norway in 1993.

== Design and description ==
The O 21-class submarines were slightly smaller versions of the preceding O 19 class since they lacked that class's minelaying capability. The boats had a length of 255 feet (77.7 m) overall, a beam of 21 feet 6 inches (6.6 m) and a draft of 13 feet (4.0 m). They displaced 987 long tons (1,003 t) on the surface and 1,488 long tons (1,512 t) submerged. The submarines had a crew of 60 officers and enlisted men.

For surface running, the boats were powered by two 2,500-brake-horsepower (1,864 kW) Sulzer diesel engines, each driving one propeller shaft. When submerged each propeller was driven by a 500-horsepower (373 kW) electric motor. They could reach 19.5 knots (36.1 km/h; 22.4 mph) on the surface and 9 knots (17 km/h; 10 mph) underwater. On the surface, the boats had a range of 10,000 nautical miles (19,000 km; 12,000 mi) at 12 knots (22 km/h; 14 mph) and 28 nmi (52 km; 32 mi) at 9 knots submerged. The submarines had a diving depth of 330 feet (100 m).

The O 21 class was armed with eight 21-inch (533 mm) torpedo tubes. Four of these were in the bow and two tubes were in the stern. The other pair were on an external rotating mount amidships. A reload was provided for each internal torpedo tube. They were also armed with two 40-millimeter (1.6 in) Bofors AA guns; these were on single watertight mounts that retracted into the conning tower when submerged.

== Construction and career ==
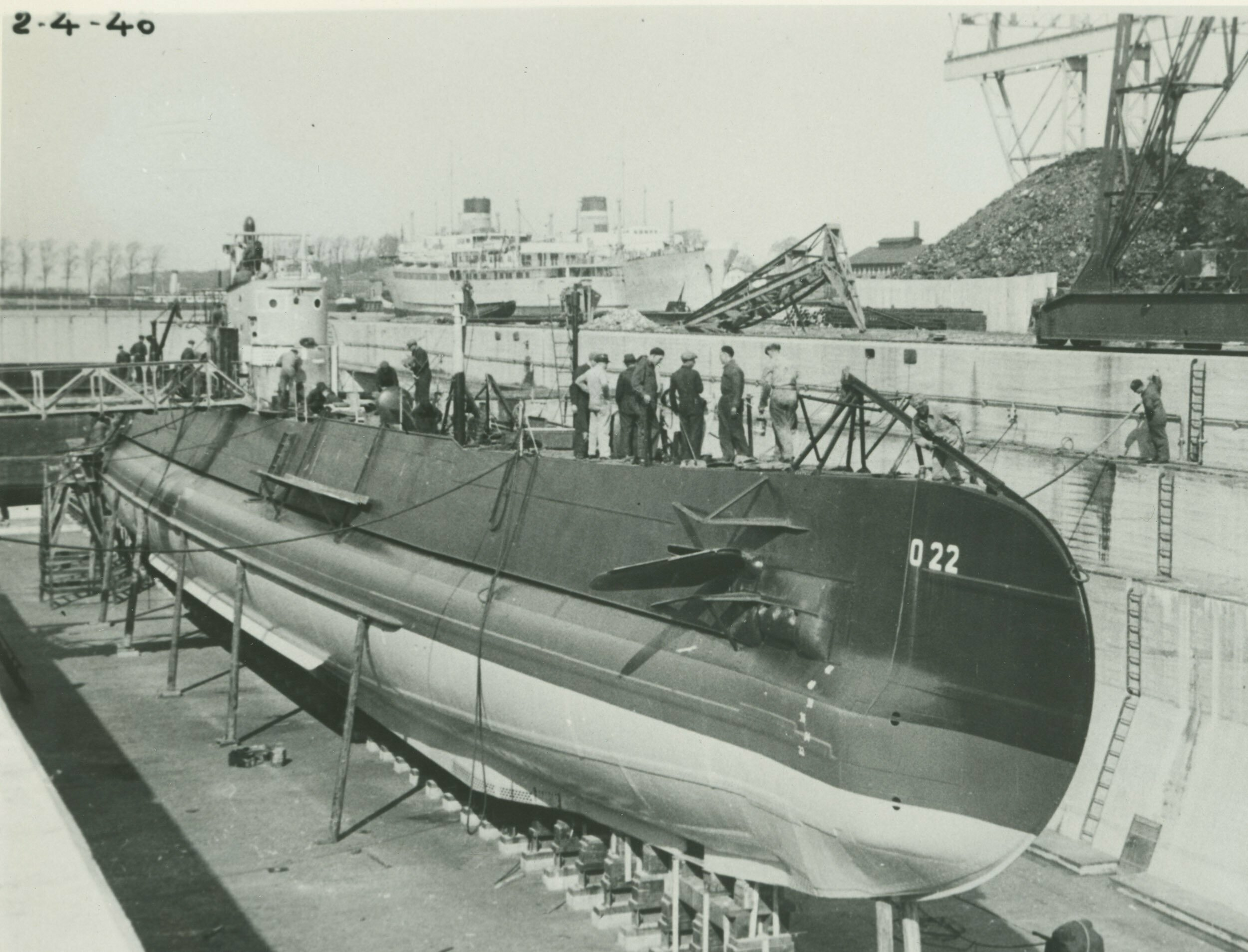
O 22 in dock in April 1940 after a trial run

O 22 was ordered on 19 June 1937 and laid down on 20 November at the shipyard of Koninklijke Maatschappij De Schelde in Vlissingen. The boat was launched on 20 January 1940. Following the German invasion of 10 May, O 22 was hastily commissioned that afternoon, still incomplete, and sailed for England together with her sister O 22 and the tugboat B.V. 37, to be finally completed at Rosyth Dockyard.

During the war she operated in the North Sea and made five patrols. During her last patrol in November O 22 was lost with her entire crew, 42 Dutch and 3 British sailors. Her wreck was discovered in 1993 by a ship of the Norwegian Petroleum Directorate. On 2 November 1996 a ceremony at the wreck site was held to commemorate the loss.

== Bibliography ==
- Bagnasco, Erminio (2018) [1977]. Submarines of World War Two: Design, Development and Operations. Naval Institute Press. ISBN 978-1-68247-384-9.
- Lenton, H.T. (1968). Royal Netherlands Navy. Navies of the Second World War. Macdonald & Co.
- Mark, Chris (1997). Schepen van de Koninklijke Marine in W.O. II (in Dutch). Alkmaar: De Alk. ISBN 90-6013-522-9.
- Noppen, Ryan K. (2020). The Royal Netherlands Navy of World War II. New Vanguard. Vol. 285. Osprey Publishing. ISBN 978-1-4728-4191-9.
- van Willigenburg, Henk (2010). Dutch Warships of World War II. Lanasta. ISBN 978-90-8616-318-2.
