= Submarine snorkel =

Device enabling a submarine to take in air

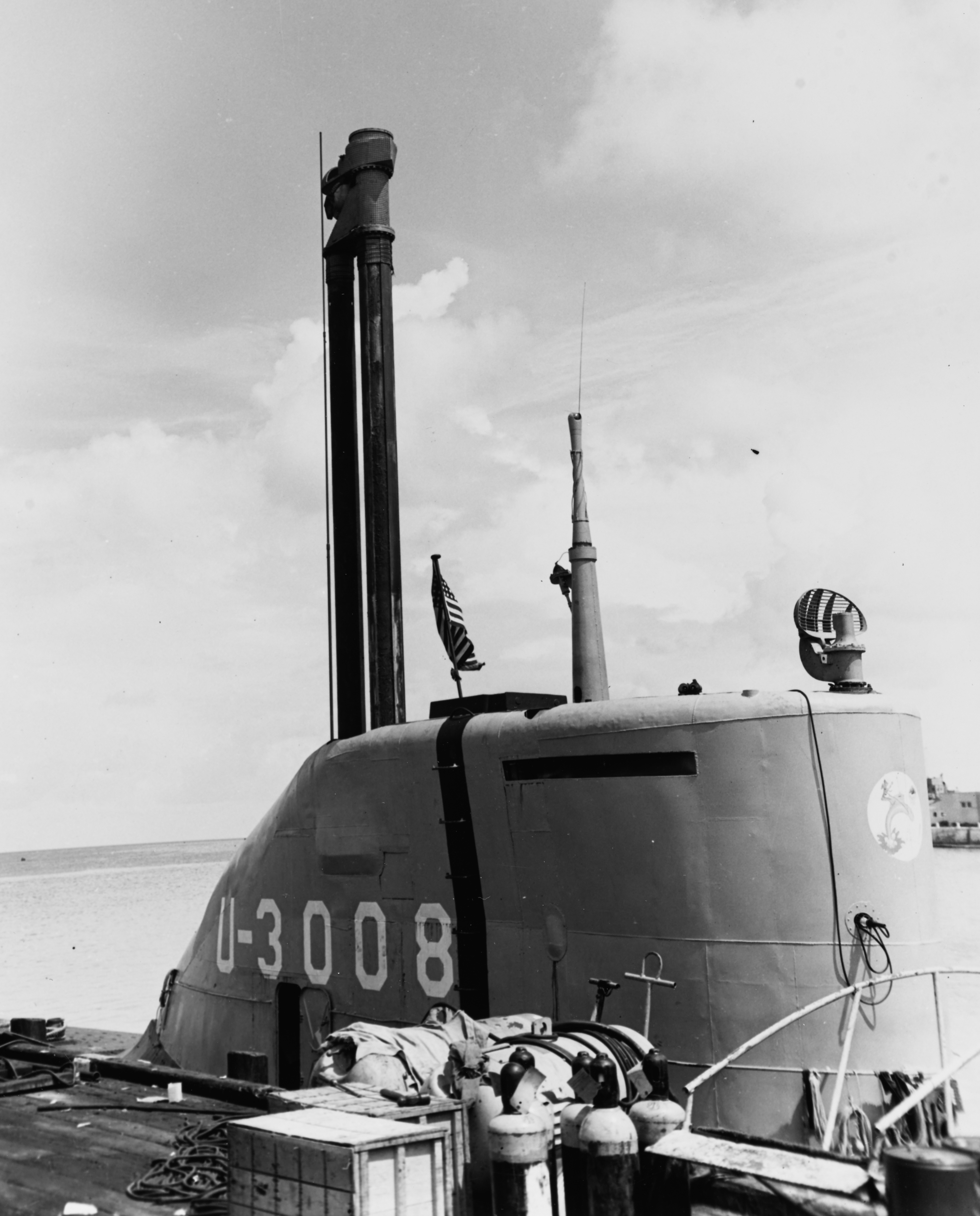
USS U-3008 (former German submarine U-3008) fairwater, with the snorkel raised.

A submarine snorkel is a device which allows the engine of a submarine to operate submerged while still taking in air from above the surface. British Royal Navy personnel often refer to it as the snort. A concept devised by Dutch engineers, it was widely used on German U-boats during the last year of World War II and known to them as a Schnorchel.

== History ==
Until the advent of nuclear power, submarines were designed to operate on the surface most of the time and submerge only for evasion or for daylight attacks. Until the widespread use of radar after 1940, at night a submarine was safer on the surface than submerged, because sonar could detect boats underwater but was almost useless against a surface vessel. However, with continued radar improvement as the war progressed, submarines (notably, the German U-boats in the Battle of the Atlantic) were forced to spend more time underwater, running on electric motors that gave speeds of only a few knots and very limited range.

The US Navy approved a simple snorkel-like idea of extending the engine air intakes up to within a foot of the periscope in May 1909, but nothing ever came of it. In June 1914, Lt JG R. S. Edwards proposed a periscope like breathing tube to feed the engines through the bilges while submerged at periscope depth, with the engine exhaust working against back-pressure. Again, this went no further than the proposal.

An early submarine snorkel was designed by James Richardson, an Assistant Manager at Scotts Shipbuilding and Engineering Company, Greenock, Scotland as early as 1916, during World War I. Although the company received a British patent for the design, no further use was made of it—the British Admiralty did not accept it for use in the Royal Navy.

In November 1926 Capt. Pericle Ferretti of the technical corps of the Italian Navy ran tests with a ventilation pipe installed on the submarine H 3. The tests were largely successful, and a similar system was designed for the Sirena class, but was eventually scrapped; subsequent snorkel systems were not based on Ferretti's design.

The Royal Netherlands Navy had been experimenting as early as 1938 with a simple pipe system on the submarines O-19 and O-20 that enabled diesel propulsion at periscope depth, while also charging the batteries. The system was designed by the Dutchman Jan Jacob Wichers. The Dutch O-21 class were equipped with such a device named a snuiver (sniffer).

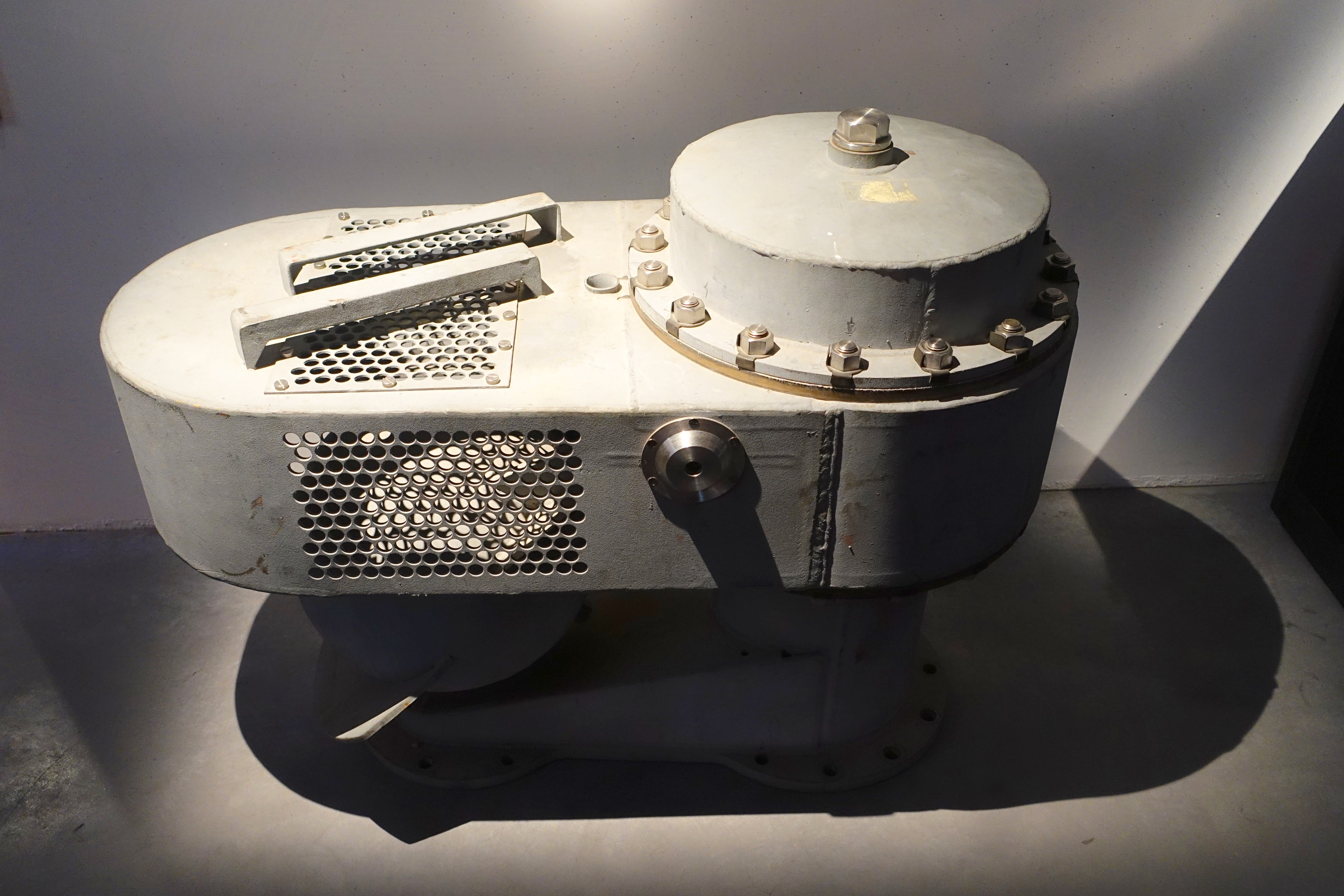
Head of the snorkel mast from German type XXI submarine U-3503, scuttled outside Gothenburg on May 8, 1945 but raised by the Swedish Navy and carefully studied for the purpose of improving future Swedish submarine designs

Germany defeated the Netherlands in 1940; their capture of O-25 and O-26 was a stroke of luck for the German Navy, the Kriegsmarine. The Kriegsmarine first viewed the snorkel as a means to take fresh air into the boats but saw no need to run the diesel engines under water. However, by 1943 more U-boats were being lost, so the snorkel was retrofitted to the VIIC and IXC classes and designed into the new XXI and XXIII types.

The first Kriegsmarine boat to be fitted with a snorkel was U-58, which experimented with the equipment in the Baltic Sea during the summer of 1943. Operational use began in early 1944, and by June 1944 about half of the boats stationed in the French bases had snorkels fitted.

On Type VII U-boats the snorkel folded forward and was stored in a recess on the port side of the hull, while on the IX Types the recess was on the starboard side. The XXI and XXIII types both had telescopic masts that rose vertically through the conning tower close to the periscope.

== Operational limitations ==
Although snorkels allowed submarines to use their diesel engines while submerged, their use had limitations and problems.

U-boats with their snorkels raised were limited to six knots to avoid damaging or breaking the tube. The Gruppenhorchgerät (the boat's hydrophone array) was useless while running diesel engines submerged.

However, the most dramatic effect caused by the use of snorkels was their ability to create partial vacuums within the submarine. Early snorkels had automatic ballcock valves fitted (to prevent seawater from waves being sucked into the diesel engines) that could slam shut in rough weather, forcing the engines to rapidly draw air from within the boat itself. The sudden reduction in pressure would cause the crew to experience extreme pain in their ears, occasionally causing ruptured eardrums. Atmospheric pressure would then hold the ballcock valve firmly shut, forcing the boat to shut down its diesel engines and surface. The engineering problem still exists in modern submarines; however, the effect is mitigated with the use of high-vacuum cut-off sensors that shut down the submerged boat's engines when any sudden pressure drop is detected. Likewise, modern snorkels have a fail-safe design. An electrical circuit controls a compressed air system that holds a "head valve" open against the pull of a powerful spring. When waves wash over exposed contacts, the control circuit breaks, venting the compressed air, causing the head valve to slam shut. The valve is immediately reopened by compressed air when the contacts are again clear of the water.

As snorkels were designed to draw in and vent gases, a submarine's diesel exhaust could be seen on the surface up to a distance of about 4.5 km (2.8 mi). Also, "periscope feather" (the wave created by the snorkel or periscope moving through the water) can be spotted in calm seas. During the early months of the Battle of the Atlantic in World War II, British ships using the radar set Model 271 were able to detect the periscope of a submerged submarine at a distance of 800 m (0.50 mi) during tests in 1940.

== See also ==
- Autolycus (submarine detector) – Detector for diesel fumes, used for submarine detection during the Cold War
