= Orzeł-class submarine =

Dutch series of submarines

Class overview
- Name: Orzeł class
- Preceded by: Wilk class
- Built: 1930s–

General characteristics
- Type: Submarine
- Displacement: 1100 tons surfaced, 1473 tons submerged
- Length: 84 m (275 ft 7 in)
- Height: 6.7 m (22 ft 0 in)
- Draft: 4 m (13 ft 1 in)
- Propulsion: Twin screws with diesel/electric motors
- Speed: Surfaced = 15 kn (28 km/h; 17 mph); Submerged = 8 kn (15 km/h; 9.2 mph)
- Range: 7,169 nmi (13,277 km; 8,250 mi) at 10 kn (19 km/h; 12 mph); Submerged: 102 nmi (189 km; 117 mi) at 5 kn (9.3 km/h; 5.8 mph)
- Crew: 56
- Armament: 12 × 550 mm (21.7-inch) torpedo tubes (4 bow 4 stern 2x2 trainable mounts), One 105 mm (4-inch) deck gun, One twin retractable 40 mm L/60 Bofors gun

The Orzeł class was a short series of submarines built in Dutch shipyards for the Polish Navy in the 1930s. Four submarines were planned but only two were completed. They saw service during World War II.

== Design ==
Initially the design was to be built in the United Kingdom, but the price proposed was too high and the British Admiralty announced that building a fast submarine with over 20 knots (37 km/h) of surface speed was technically impossible. The two submarines were ordered in De Schelde and Rotterdamse Shipyards, ORP Orzeł (Eagle) and ORP Sęp (Vulture). Design was made in cooperation with a team from Polish Navy, and incorporated some features of the earlier Dutch submarine HNLMS O 16 including the external trainable mount. The hull was entirely welded, and all controls were hydraulically operated. The design was made to fulfill the Polish requirements for a multi-purpose vessel, to be used both in the shallow waters of the Baltic Sea and in the high seas. They were among the most modern submersibles in the Allied fleets at the outbreak of World War II. Their speed was 19.5 knots (36 km/h). This class of submarine was the basis for next Dutch O 19-class submarines.

Two further submarines based upon the plans of the Orzeł class were ordered from France in 1938 and their construction began in 1939, but because of the outbreak of war, they were never completed.

== Service history ==
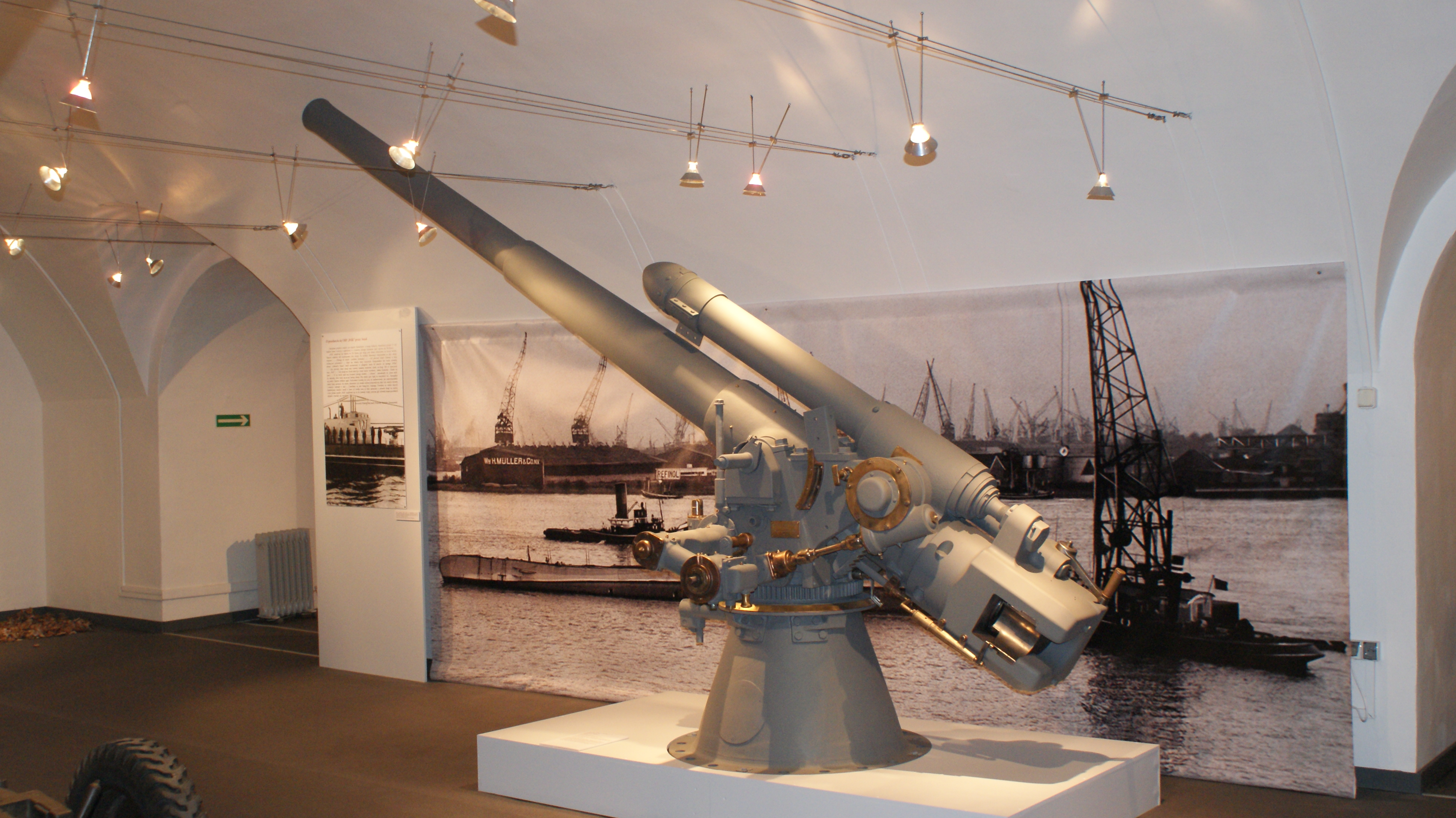
105 mm deck gun from ORP Sęp, on display at Museum of Polish Military Technology

Orzeł was ordered in 1935 and commissioned in February 1939. After the outbreak of World War II, on 14 September 1939 Orzeł and Wilk ("Wolf") were ordered to make for British ports. Wilk arrived in Britain on 20 September 1939. Orzeł arrived on 14 October 1939, after escaping from internment in neutral Estonia (the Orzeł incident) and an adventurous voyage with no charts. On 8 April 1940 Orzeł sank the troopship Rio de Janeiro at the start of the German invasion of Norway. Orzeł was lost with all hands for unknown reasons while on patrol in North Sea in June 1940. Orzeł's loss is one of the biggest mysteries in Polish naval history.

== Boats in class ==
There were two boats of the Orzeł class built. Two more were ordered from France, but never completed.

Construction data
Name	Builder	Launched	Fate
Orzeł ('eagle')	De Schelde, Vlissingen	15 January 1938	Declared missing 8 June 1940
Sęp ('vulture')	RDM, Rotterdam	17 October 1938	Interned Sept. 1939, stricken 1970

== See also ==
Equivalent submarines of the same era

- O 21 class
- T class
- Brin class
- Aurore class
- Mackerel class
- S class
- Type VII
