= ORP Sęp (1938) =

Polish submarine

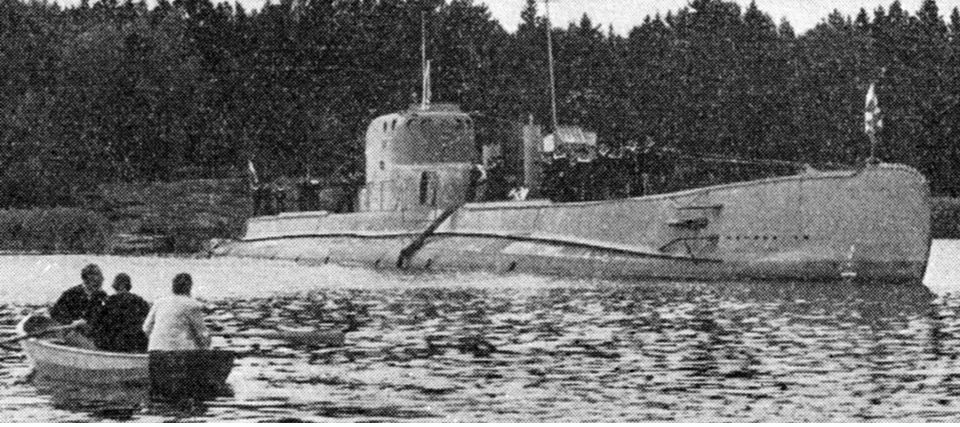
- ORP Sęp in Sweden 1939.

History

Poland
- Name: ORP Sęp
- Builder: Rotterdamsche Droogdok Maatschappij
- Yard number: RDM-196
- Laid down: November 1936
- Launched: 17 October 1938
- Commissioned: 16 April 1939
- Decommissioned: 15 September 1969
- Fate: Scrapped in 1972

General characteristics
- Class & type: Orzeł-class submarine
- Displacement: 1,100 t., surfaced; 1,437 t., submerged
- Length: 84 m (275 ft 7 in)
- Beam: 6.7 m (22 ft 0 in)
- Draft: 4.2 m (13 ft 9 in)
- Speed: 19.4 knots (35.9 km/h; 22.3 mph), surfaced; 9.0 knots (16.7 km/h; 10.4 mph), submerged
- Complement: 50-53
- Armament: 1 × 105 mm (4.1 in); 2 × 40 mm (1.6 in) AA guns; 8 × 533 mm (21.0 in) torpedo tubes

ORP Sęp was an Orzeł-class submarine serving in the Polish Navy during World War II. In Polish her name means Vulture.

== Construction ==
Built at the Dutch shipyard Rotterdamsche Droogdok Maatschappij, she was laid down in November 1936 and launched on 17 October 1938. In early 1939 the Polish team supervising the building of the ship noticed a significant slowdown in her construction, which it attributed to the action of German agents. Because of fears that German pressure on the Netherlands would prevent that country from delivering the ship into Polish hands, it was decided to bring the ship to Poland earlier than scheduled. On 2 April, the ship left for deep water sea trials in Horten, Norway, with a crew of Polish sailors and Dutch technicians, under the Dutch flag. After completing the trials, the Polish crew took control of the ship (against the will of the Dutch technicians on board), raised the Polish flag and left Horten to rendezvous with the Polish destroyer ORP Burza outside the harbour. All but two Dutch workers were left ashore in Norway. From Burza the submarine received additional crew and supplies, then sailed under her escort to Poland. On the way the ship ran out of diesel fuel and had to be taken in tow by the destroyer. On 18 April Sęp arrived in Gdynia, entering the harbour on her electric engines, and was officially commissioned into the Polish Navy. The remaining two Dutch technicians were released and allowed to return home. The fitting out of the ship continued in Poland, with parts arriving from the Netherlands after the relations with the Dutch were repaired following the "hijacking", but was not finished before the war broke out, hence the ship was not at full readiness in September 1939. A visit to Rotterdam to finish the fitting out was contemplated but the outbreak of war prevented it.

== World War II ==
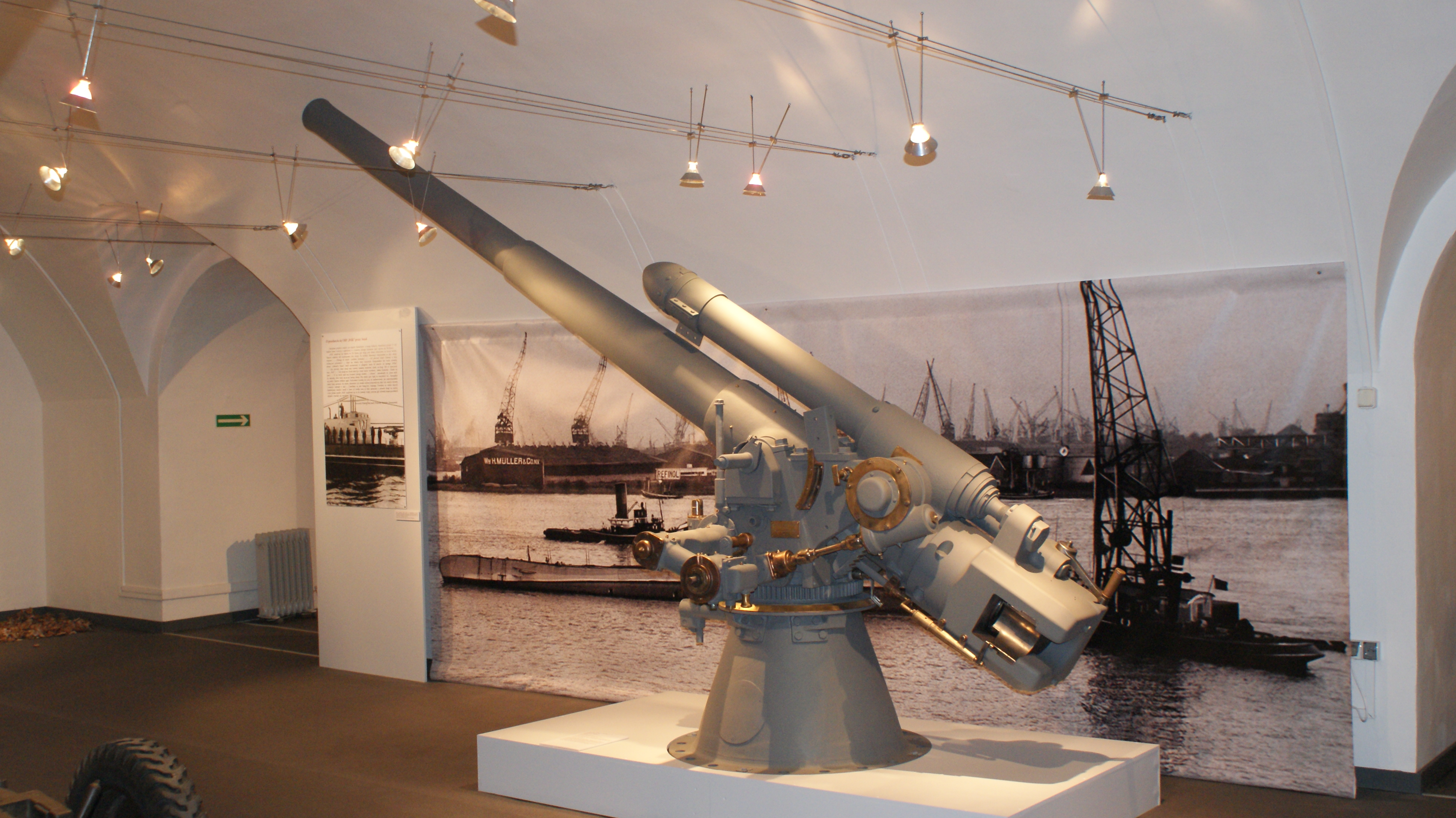
105 mm gun from ORP Sęp displayed in the Polish Army Museum

Sęp sailed into the naval port of Hel a few days before the war started, commanded by kmdr ppor. Władysław Salamon. On 1 September, the first day of the war, the submarine took up her patrol sector in accordance with the Worek Plan. On 2 September she attacked a German destroyer Friedrich Ihn with a single torpedo which missed, with the destroyer responding with heavy depth-charging which damaged the submarine, causing water leaks. On 3 September in the evening Sęp was attacked twice by German submarines, while on a surface. On 19.51 U-18 fired one torpedo at a Polish submarine, which was most probably Sęp, but missed. Next, U-14 approached undetected, fired one torpedo at about 20.40, and quickly dived. There is a common version, that a magnetic primer failed, and the torpedo blew up before the target, damaging it, however Polish documents prove, that an explosion was detected well behind the stern, and made no harm. According to an analysis by Jan Bartelski, the torpedo missed because of a greater speed of Sęp. It however made German propaganda believe, that the submarine was sunk. German submarines did not want to risk a surface combat with faster and better armed Polish ships, hence they undertook hasty actions. With her position clearly revealed to the enemy, the submarine left her assigned sector and began to sail in the direction of Gotland Island. Over the next few days she operated without contact with the enemy in the vicinity of Sweden, her crew trying to repair the damage, and her captain requesting permission to return to base in order to carry out more repairs, which was denied.

On 13 September the submarine received orders permitting her to sail to England if possible, and otherwise to be interned in a neutral Swedish port. The crew at first decided to sail for England but over the next few days the ship's condition deteriorated further, with serious leaks into the ship when submerged, and the submerging itself taking up to 30 minutes, unacceptably long if the ship was to successfully pass through German patrols on the way to England. On 15 September her commander decided to sail for Sweden. On 17 September the submarine appeared off Stockholm and requested permission to enter the harbor to carry out repairs. These were clearly so extensive that they could not be finished in the limited time allowed under international law, so the submarine's commander decided that the ship should be interned by the Swedish authorities. In late September the ship was disarmed and her propulsion systems disabled.

In early 1940 attempts were made for Sęp and the two other interned Polish submarines to be released by Sweden and allowed to proceed to Britain, after necessary repairs. However, with German wartime successes, particularly the German occupation of Norway, the possibility of Sweden allowing such a move receded. The Polish submarines were moved around various Swedish ports in the course of the war, and even received maintenance work, but were not allowed to leave.

== Post-war service ==
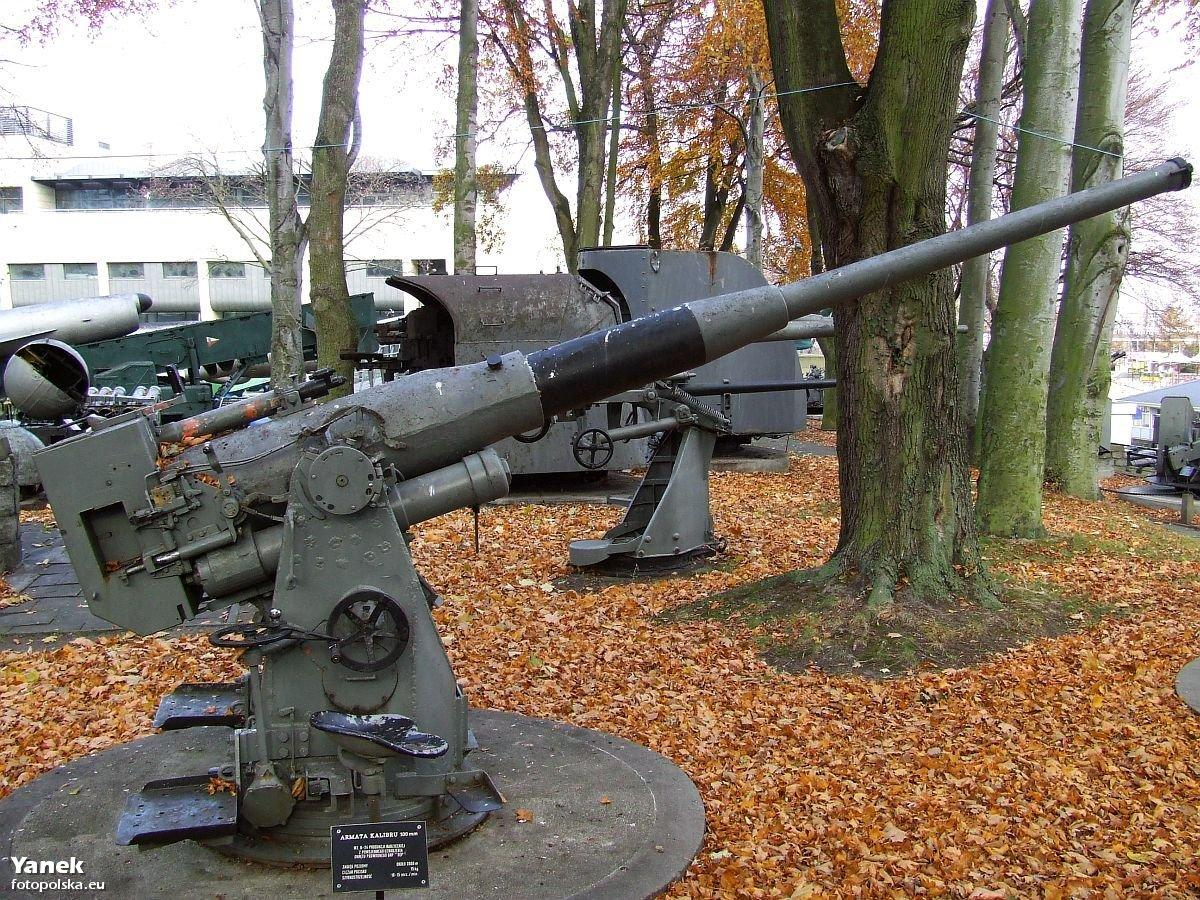
100 mm Soviet cannon that ORP Sęp was rearmed with after the war, on display at the Polish Navy Museum in Gdynia

After the war ended, on 23 June 1945 a Polish Military Commission arrived in Sweden to arrange for the return of the interned submarines to Poland. On 5 September the submarines officially returned to Polish control, and after repair work left Sweden on 21 October, and reached the Polish coast on 25 October.

On 30 November 1945 Sęp was again officially commissioned into the Polish Navy. In 1946 she was rearmed with Soviet caliber torpedoes and guns. In 1951 eight crew members were accused of plotting to defect with the ship to Sweden, and were prosecuted in a Stalinist show trial. In a 1959 Polish film the ship was used to portray her twin Orzeł. In 1959 the submarine became a training ship. She remained the largest submarine of the postwar Polish Navy until 1962 when it commissioned the first of four Soviet-built Whiskey-class submarines, which were of similar size. In 1964 she suffered a serious fire (8 crew members died), after which she was repaired, but was not fully operational. In 1969 the ship suffered another accident while submerged. The ship was decommissioned on 15 September 1969 and subsequently scrapped in 1972.

In 2002 the Polish Navy commissioned the second ORP Sęp, a Kobben-class submarine obtained from Norway.
