= HNLMS O 20 =

- O 20

History

Netherlands
- Name: O 20
- Builder: Wilton-Fijenoord, Rotterdam
- Laid down: 15 June 1936
- Launched: 31 January 1939
- Commissioned: 28 August 1939
- Fate: Sunk on 19 December 1941

General characteristics
- Class & type: O 19-class submarine
- Displacement: 1109 tons surfaced; 1491 tons submerged
- Length: 80.7 m (264 ft 9 in)
- Beam: 7.41 m (24 ft 4 in)
- Draught: 3.87 m (12 ft 8 in)
- Propulsion: 2 × 2,650 bhp (1,976 kW) diesel engines; 2 × 500 bhp (373 kW) electric motors
- Speed: 19.5 kn (36.1 km/h; 22.4 mph) surfaced; 9 kn (17 km/h; 10 mph) submerged
- Range: 10,000 nmi (19,000 km; 12,000 mi) at 12 kn (22 km/h; 14 mph) on the surface; 27 nmi (50 km; 31 mi) at 8.5 kn (15.7 km/h; 9.8 mph) submerged
- Complement: 40
- Armament: 4 × 21 in (530 mm) bow torpedo tubes; 4 × 21 in (530 mm) stern torpedo tubes; 2 × external amidship mine tubes (10 mines each); 1 x 88 mm gun; 1 x 40 mm gun

O 20, laid down as K XX, was a O 19-class submarine of the Royal Netherlands Navy that saw service during World War II. O 20 along with her sister ship O 19 were the first boats in the world to be equipped with a submarine snorkel that allowed the submarine to run its diesel engines while submerged.

== Ship history ==
O 20 was laid down 15 June 1936 as K XX. After which at some point she was renamed O 20. She was launched on 31 January 1939, and on 28 August of the same year she was commissioned in the Dutch navy.

She was put into a squadron that consisted of two submarines: O 20 and O 15, and the sloop Van Kinsbergen. This squadron departed the Netherlands for the Netherlands West Indies on either 2 or 3 October 1939.

By December 1939 O 20 reached the Dutch East Indies via the Panama Canal.

=== World War II ===
On 10 May 1940 Germany attacked the Netherlands. On 7 December 1941, the Japanese attack on Pearl Harbor brought the US into the war. The Netherlands followed suit hours later. By early December 1941, O 20 had been stationed at Singapore Submarine Base and was under the command of the British Eastern Fleet. On 14 December 1941 O 20 was under orders to patrol the South China Sea. When two battleships and six cruisers were sighted, O 20 and O 19 were given orders to gain position on the enemy ships. The two subs would split paths en route to the target when 13 transports were spotted off Patani, Thailand and another 20 off Kota Bharu, Malaysia.

Given a new patrol route, O 20 spotted Japanese destroyers off and on from 17 to 19 December. On 19 December at 7:00, she spied two Japanese transports being escorted by two destroyers. In a few hours a third destroyer joined them. These destroyers were Ayanami, Uranami, and Yugiri. At 11:00, O 20 was spotted by enemy planes which dropped two bombs on the submarine and alerted the destroyers to her presence. The submarine dived and was able to avoid the bombs but the destroyers began to drop depth charges which soon destroyed the submarine's listening device and caused other minor damage.

The destroyers scanned the bay for O 20, dropping eight depth charges every half-hour. Some of these detonated directly above the submarine, but were set to detonate too shallow to badly damage it. (It turned out that the next deepest setting would have buried the charges in the mud.) To escape, the commander ordered full speed ahead with all planes set to rise, but O 20 had become mired in the mud. An air tank was blown to loose the submarine from the seabed but also alerted the destroyers to O 20's position by releasing bubbles.

That night, the commander attempted to surface to escape at full speed but was detected by a new Japanese sonar. Two more tanks were blown and the sub surfaced at a 25° angle and engines were set to full speed. Because of existing defects O 20 began to take on water at the screw shafts. The hatch was opened and with no enemy ships in sight, the machine guns were not manned or prepared. The commander decided to empty a fuel tank to escape even faster, which rose the sub even higher in the water exposing the diesel exhaust pipes. Due to more existing damage coupled with damage from the depth charges, the pipes began to spark, giving away O 20's position to anyone who looked in her direction. The commander decided to do nothing.

After 20 minutes of running in this manner, one of the destroyers closed in, spotted O 20 with her searchlight and opened fire. The shot missed. The commander now ordered the machine guns manned and the ship turned about to fire the torpedoes. She couldn't get in position until after the fourth volley, which struck the conning tower and main hull. O 20 returned fire with her 40 mm gun. The port side torpedo was ordered to be fired but because of extreme vibrations at such speed, both sides fired and both missed.

The submarine was badly damaged; the commander decided then that there was no hope for escape and ordered all hands on deck. He then ordered that the submarine be scuttled by flooding all the main ballast tanks. The submarine submerged, still running at full speed, as the crew floated above. The destroyer, apparently not noticing that the crew had abandoned ship, followed the submarine, cutting through the crew at 20 knots (37 km/h) and dropped depth charges on the abandoned submarine.

After daylight, Uranami rescued the 32 survivors, having dropped depth charges throughout the remainder of the night to keep sharks away. Seven men, including the commander were found to be missing. The commander was known to not have been wearing his life vest, which may have also been the cause of the other six deaths. An alternative suggestion is that since the six men all worked in the engine room, they may have not been warned in time to evacuate the ship before it was scuttled.

=== The shipwreck ===
On 12 June 2002 a group of seven Dutch divers participated in a dive expedition to locate O 20. They found her wreck approximately 35 nautical miles (65 km; 40 mi) northeast of Kota Baru, Malaysia, at a depth of about 144 feet (44 m). The divers reported that the masts were no longer visible, the snorkel is gone, and the bridge was shelled so badly it could be seen through easily. The divers retrieved a deck phone from the submarine in order to positively identify it, but otherwise left the wreck alone, as it was likely the gravesite of six seamen and their commanding officer.
