= O 21-class submarine =

Dutch submarine class (1940–1959)

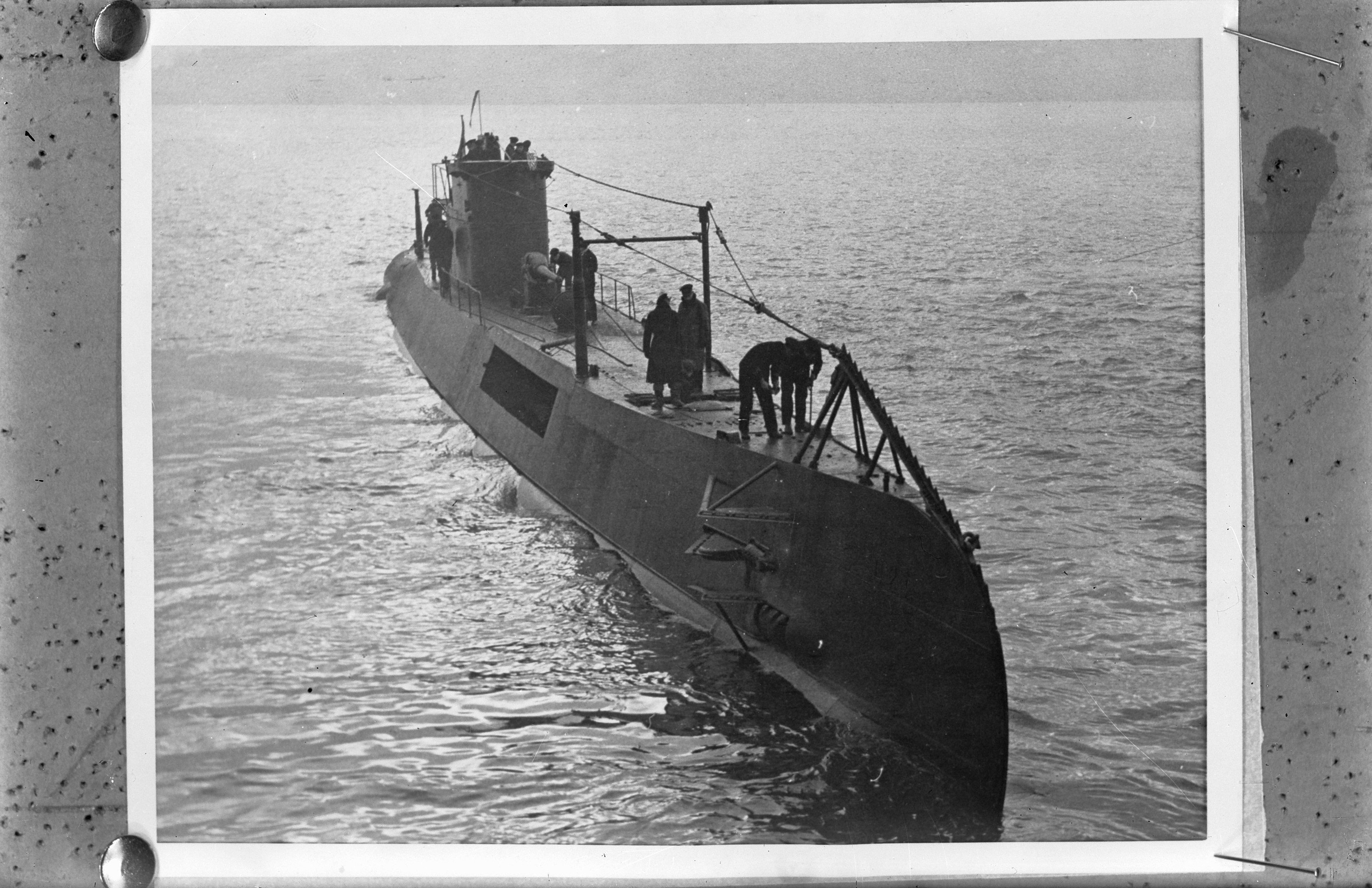
- O 21

Class overview
- Name: O 21 class
- Builders: Rotterdamsche Droogdok Maatschappij; Koninklijke Maatschappij De Schelde; Wilton-Fijenoord
- Operators: Royal Netherlands Navy; Kriegsmarine
- Preceded by: O 19 class
- Succeeded by: Dolfijn class
- Built: 1937–1942
- In commission: 1940–1959
- Completed: 7
- Lost: 2
- Scrapped: 5

General characteristics
- Type: Submarine
- Displacement: 990 tons surfaced; 1205 tons submerged
- Length: 77.7 m (254 ft 11 in)
- Beam: 6.8 m (22 ft 4 in)
- Draught: 3.95 m (13 ft 0 in)
- Propulsion: 2 shafts; 2 × Sulzer 7 QD 42/50 diesel engines, 2,500 bhp (1,864 kW) each; 2 × 500 bhp (373 kW) electric motors; 2 × 96 cells batteries (5350 Ah)
- Speed: 19.5 kn (36.1 km/h; 22.4 mph) surfaced; 9 kn (17 km/h; 10 mph) submerged
- Range: 10,000 nmi (19,000 km; 12,000 mi) at 12 kn (22 km/h; 14 mph) surfaced; 28 nmi (52 km; 32 mi) at 8.5 kn (15.7 km/h; 9.8 mph) submerged
- Complement: 39
- Armament: 8 × 21 in (530 mm) torpedo tubes (4 bow, 2 stern, 2 traversing amidships ); 1 × 88 mm deck gun; 2 × 40 mm AA guns; 1 × 12.7 mm machine gun

The O 21 class was a class of seven submarines, built for the Royal Netherlands Navy. The boats were still incomplete at the start of the German invasion of the Netherlands, O 21, O 22, O 23 and O 24 were hastily launched and escaped to the United Kingdom. O 25, O 26 and O 27 were not able to escape and were captured by the German forces. The Kriegsmarine ordered the completion of the boats and they entered German service as UD-3, UD-4 and UD-5. The submarines' diving depth was 100 meters (330 ft).

At the start of the Second World War the O 21 class was together with the British U, S and T classes and German Type VII one of the most advanced submarine classes in service.

== Design ==
The O 21 class submarines were designed by the Dutch engineer G. de Rooy, chief engineer of the Royal Netherlands Navy (RNN) at the time. They were similar to the submarines of the O 19 class, except the boats had no minelaying capability. The omission of the minelaying capability resulted in a smaller and more streamlined hull which made it possible to reach a higher surface speed. Visually the boats showed many similarities to the German Type VII submarine. The submarines of the O 21 class had a length of 77.70 metres (254 ft 11 in), a beam of 6.80 metres (22 ft 4 in) and a draught of 3.95 metres (13 ft 0 in). Above water they had a displacement of 990 tons and submerged they had displacement of 1,205 tons. There was enough space aboard for a crew of 39 to 60 persons.

One of the requirements the RNN set for the O 21 class was that it had to be able to dive 20 m (66 ft) deeper than the previous class, which was the O 19 class.

=== Armament ===
The primary armament of the O 21-class submarines consisted of eight 53.3-centimetre (21.0 in) torpedo tubes; four were located at the bow, two at the stern and two external amidships. There was room for a total of fourteen torpedoes, with eight being in the torpedo tubes and six for reloads. Besides the eight torpedo tubes the O 21 class was also equipped with an 8.8 cm (3.5 in) deck gun, two single-mounted 40 mm (1.6 in) anti-aircraft guns and a single 12.7 mm (0.50 in) machine gun. The three unfinished boats (O 25, O 26 and O 27) that were captured and later completed by Nazi Germany during the Second World War had besides the eight torpedo tubes, a single 8.8 cm deck gun, and two 20 mm guns.

=== Propulsion ===
The O 21-class submarines were equipped with two seven-cylinder two-stroke Sulzer 7 QD 42/50 diesel engines that each could produce 1,000 shaft horsepower (750 kW) and drive the two screws of the submarine to a maximum surface speed of 19.5 knots (36.1 km/h; 22.4 mph). Besides the two diesel engines, the submarines also had two electric motors that each could produce 500 brake horsepower (500 bhp) and two banks of 96 cells batteries with a capacity of 5,350 Ah. This allowed the submarine to operate solely on electric power for five hours. The maximum underwater speed was 9 knots (17 km/h; 10 mph).

== Boats ==
O 23 returning from patrol in 1946. Dutch newsreel.

The boats were built by three different shipyards. O 21 and O 22 were built by the Koninklijke Maatschappij De Schelde. O 23, O 24, O 26 and O 27 by RDM and O 25 at the Wilton-Fijenoord shipyard.

O 21 class construction data
Name	Laid down	Launched	Commissioned	Decommissioned
O 21	13 July 1937	21 October 1939	10 May 1940 (uncompleted)	2 November 1957
O 22	15 September 1938	20 January 1940	10 May 1940 (uncompleted)	8 November 1940
O 23	12 October 1937	5 December 1939	13 May 1940 (uncompleted)	1 December 1948
O 24	12 November 1937	18 March 1940	13 May 1940 (uncompleted)	22 February 1954
O 25; Commissioned as: UD-3	10 April 1939	1 May 1940	1 March 1942	13 October 1944; 3 May 1945 (scuttled)
O 26; Commissioned as: UD-4	20 April 1939	23 November 1940	1 March 1941	3 May 1945 (scuttled)
O 27; Commissioned as: UD-5	3 August 1939	26 September 1941	1 November 1941; 13 July 1945 (Dutch navy)	14 November 1959

== See also ==
Equivalent submarines of the same era

- Aurore class
- T class
- Brin class
- Orzeł class
- Mackerel class
- S class
- Type VII
