= HNLMS O 24 =

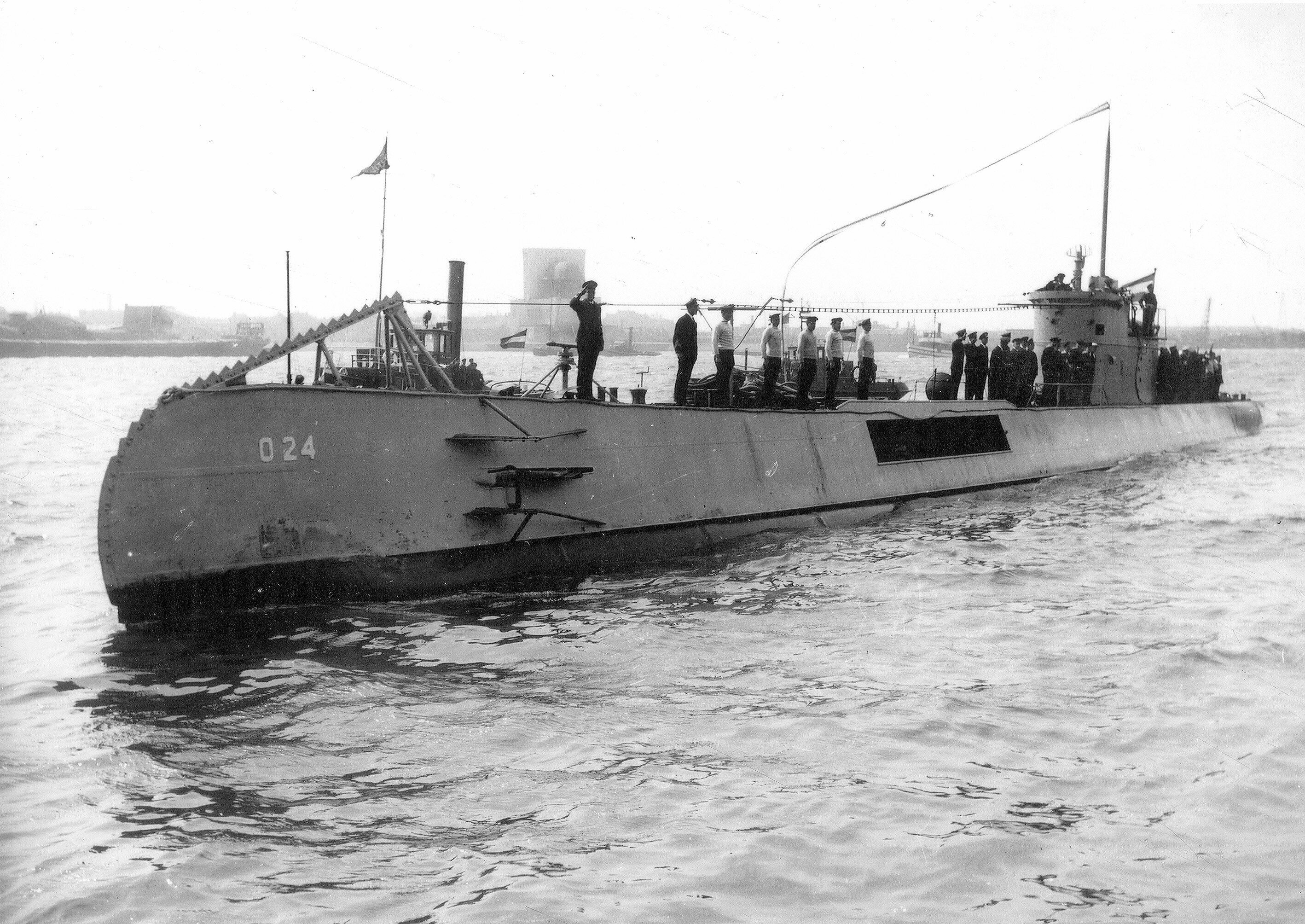
- O 24 in 1946

History

Netherlands
- Name: HNLMS O 24
- Builder: Rotterdamsche Droogdok Maatschappij, Rotterdam
- Yard number: RDM-206
- Laid down: 12 November 1937
- Launched: 18 March 1940
- Commissioned: 13 May 1940
- Decommissioned: June 1955
- Stricken: 1962
- Fate: Sold for scrapping, 1963

General characteristics
- Class & type: O 21-class submarine
- Displacement: 990 tons surfaced; 1205 tons submerged
- Length: 77.7 m (254 ft 11 in)
- Beam: 6.8 m (22 ft 4 in)
- Draught: 3.95 m (13 ft 0 in)
- Propulsion: 2 × 2,500 bhp (1,864 kW) diesel engines; 2 × 500 bhp (373 kW) electric motors
- Speed: 19.5 kn (36.1 km/h; 22.4 mph) surfaced; 9 kn (17 km/h; 10 mph) submerged
- Range: 10,000 nmi (19,000 km; 12,000 mi) at 12 kn (22 km/h; 14 mph) surfaced; 28 nmi (52 km; 32 mi) at 8.5 kn (15.7 km/h; 9.8 mph) submerged
- Complement: 39
- Armament: 4 × 21 in (533 mm) bow torpedo tubes; 2 × 21 in stern torpedo tubes; 2 × 21 in (1×2) external-traversing TT amidships (removed post-war); 40 mm Vickers gun, replaced in early 1942 by 20 mm Oerlikon; British Mk IV and Mk VIII torpedoes; German G7a torpedoes

Service record
- Commanders: Lt.Cdr G.B.M. van Erkel (12 May – 1 June 1940); Lt.Cdr O. de Booy (14 July 1940 – 3 March 1942); Lt.Cdr W.J. de Vries (3 March 1942 – 25 October 1944); Lt.Cdr P.J.S. de Jong (25 October 1944 – 8 April 1946)
- Operations: 24 war patrols
- Victories: 8 ships sunk totalling 15,598 tons

O 24, laid down K XXIV was an O 21-class submarine of the Royal Netherlands Navy that saw service during World War II. The most famous occupant of O-24 was Piet de Jong, who was the commanding officer from 1944 until 1946 and who later became Minister of Defence in 1963 and served as Prime Minister of the Netherlands from 1967 until 1971.

== Ship history ==
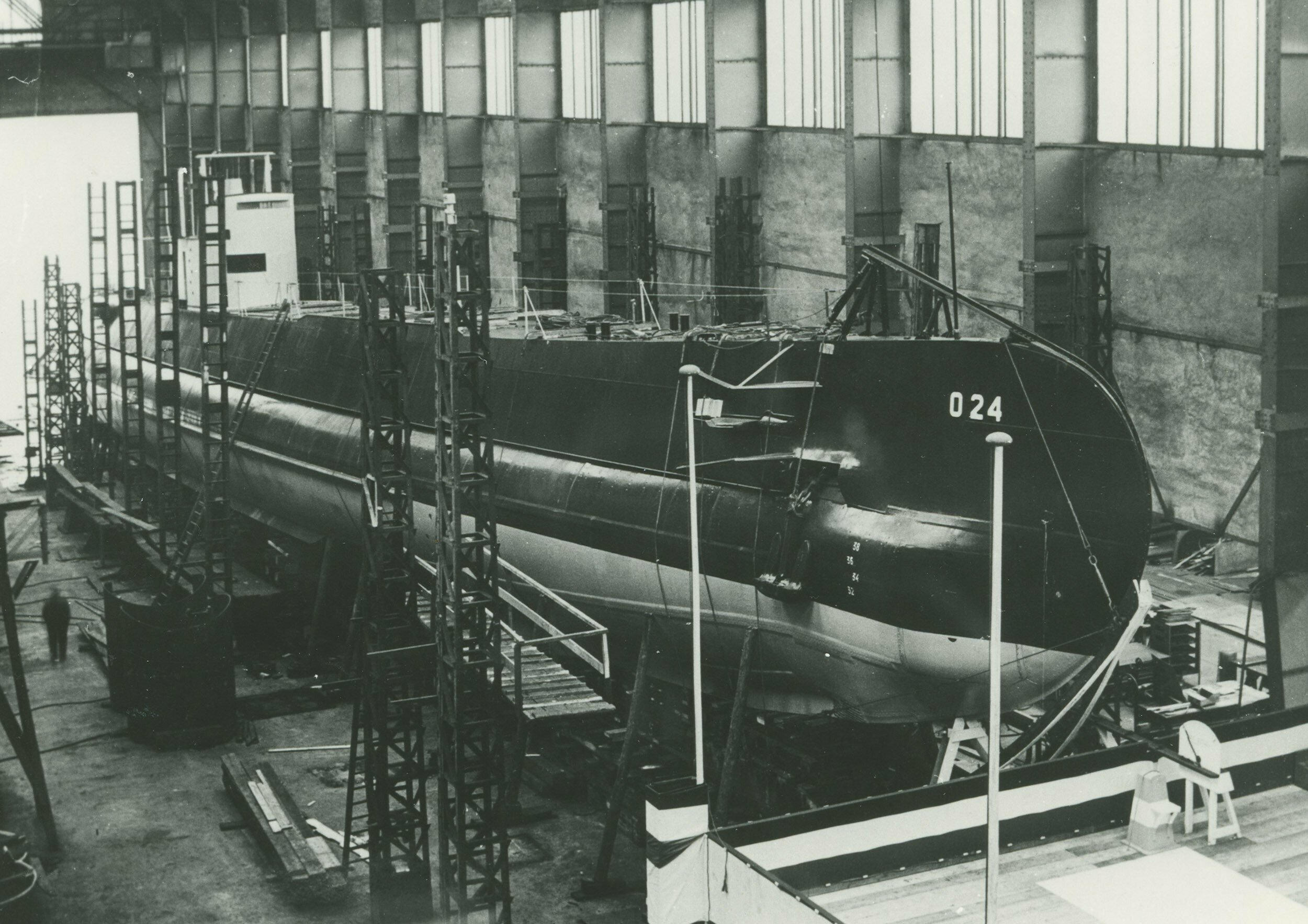
O 24 under construction in March 1940 at Rotterdamsche Droogdok Maatschappij (RDM).

The submarine was laid down on 12 November 1937 as K XXIV at the Rotterdamsche Droogdok Maatschappij (RDM) shipyard in Rotterdam. During construction she was renamed O 24, and was finally launched on 18 March 1940. Following the German invasion of 10 May 1940, O 24 was hastily commissioned, still incomplete, and sailed for England on 13 May, to be finally completed at the Thornycroft shipyard at Southampton.

From September 1940 she was attached to the 9th Submarine Flotilla at Dundee for patrols in the North Sea and off the Norwegian coast. In March 1941 she joined the 8th Submarine Flotilla at Gibraltar for operations in the Bay of Biscay and Atlantic Ocean, and convoy patrol duties. She also operated off the east coast of Italy, sinking several ships.

In July 1942 O 24 was transferred to the British Eastern Fleet based at Colombo in Ceylon for operations in the Indian Ocean. Her patrols took her into the Strait of Malacca, off Sumatra, and around the Andaman Islands, attacking Japanese shipping and also landing small groups of British special forces on various islands. In mid-1944 she was refitted at the Philadelphia Navy Yard, then sailed for Fremantle, Australia, for further operations in the East Indies. After the Japanese surrender she was based at Batavia, before finally returning to the Netherlands in April 1946.

O 24 was reduced to the status of training ship in 1947, and was decommissioned in June 1955 to serve as a floating battery until 1958, then as an instruction vessel until 1962 when she was struck, and sold for scrapping the following year.

== Victories ==
Ships sunk by O 24.

Date	Ship name	Nationality/Type	Tonnage (GRT)	Coordinates
12 June 1941	Fianona	Italian tanker	6600	43°08′N 10°30′E
12 June 1941	V 121 Carloforte	Italian auxiliary patrol vessel	143	43°45′N 09°20′E
6 August 1941	Bombardiere	Italian freighter	613	41°47′N 12°06′E
7 August 1941	Margherita Madre	Italian schooner	296	41°23′N 12°28′E
6 September 1941	V 63 Carla	Italian auxiliary patrol vessel	347	43°45′N 09°21′E
9 September 1941	Italo Balbo	Italian freighter	5114	42°47′N 09°57′E
21 February 1943	Bandai Maru	Japanese coaster	165	07°52′N 98°16′E
20 August 1943	Chosa Maru	Japanese auxiliary gunboat	2538	05°09′N 100°10′E
14 Apr 1945	Goenoeng Talang II	Japanese sailing cargo vessel	40	02°20′S 100°49′E
