= German trawler V 1101 Preußen =

1930 trawler and patrol boat

History

Germany
- Name: August Wriedt (1930–33); Preußen (1933–44)
- Owner: Nordsee Deutsche Hochseefisherei (1930–39); Kriegsmarine (1939-44)
- Port of registry: (Weimar Republic) Nordenham, Germany (1930–33); (Weimar Republic) Cuxhaven, Germany (1933–35); (Nazi Germany) Cuxhaven, Germany (1935–39); (Nazi Germany) Kriegsmarine (1939–44)
- Builder: Schiffswerft J. Frerichs & Co, Einswarden
- Yard number: 552
- Launched: 1930
- Commissioned: July 1930
- Out of service: 13 August 1944
- Identification: Code Letters RHQP (1930–34); Code Letters DHBR (1934–39); V 1101 (1939–44)
- Fate: Sunk by RAF aircraft 13 August 1944

General characteristics
- Tonnage: 425 GRT; 163 NRT
- Length: 53.59 metres (175 ft 10 in)
- Beam: 7.69 metres (25 ft 3 in)
- Draught: 3.77 metres (12 ft 4 in)
- Depth: 3.78 metres (12 ft 5 in)
- Installed power: Triple expansion steam engine, 93nhp, later 115 nhp
- Propulsion: Single screw propeller

Preußen was a fishing trawler requisitioned during World War II by the Kriegsmarine for use as a Vorpostenboot. She was built in 1930 as August Wriedt, and was renamed Preußen in 1933. On 13 August 1944, she was sunk off Langeoog by Bristol Beaufighter aircraft of 254 Squadron, Royal Air Force.

== Description ==
The ship was 53.59 metres (175 ft 10 in) long, with a beam of 7.69 metres (25 ft 3 in). She had a depth of 3.78 metres (12 ft 5 in), and a draught of 3.77 metres (12 ft 4 in). She was assessed at 415 GRT, 125 NRT. She was powered by a triple expansion steam engine driving a single screw propeller via a low pressure turbine, double reduction gearing and a hydraulic coupling. The engine, rated at 93nhp, was built by the Deutsche Schiff- und Maschinenbau, AG Weser, Bremen.

== History ==
August Wriedt was built as yard number 552 in 1930 by Schiffswerft J. Frerichs & Co, Einswarden as a fishing trawler for the Nordsee Deutsche Hochseefischerei. She was completed in July 1930. Her port of registry was Nordenham and the Code Letters RHQP were allocated. By 1933, she had been renamed Preußen, and her port of registry was Cuxhaven. Her engine was then rated at 115 nhp. In 1934, her Code Letters were changed to DHBR.

In September 1939, Preußen was requisitioned by the Kriegsmarine, initially serving in the Baltic Sea as Vorpostenboot V 1101 Preußen with 11 Vorpostenflotille, which was under the command of Kapitänleutnant der Reserve Günther Reisen. From January 1940, she served in the North Sea. On 14 March 1940, she found part of a torpedo from U-54, which had been missing since 20 February, presumed to have been sunk by a mine with the loss of all 41 of her crew. On 5 June 1940, the cargo ship Palime struck a mine off Stavanger, Norway and was beached. V 1101 Preußen was one of five vessels that assisted in the salvage of her cargo.

On 13 August 1944, V1101 Preußen and the M1943-class minesweeper M 383 were sunk with rockets at 53°50′N 7°40′E off Langeoog, Lower Saxony by Bristol Beaufighter aircraft of 254 Squadron, Royal Air Force.
