= German submarine U-54 (1939) =

German World War II submarine

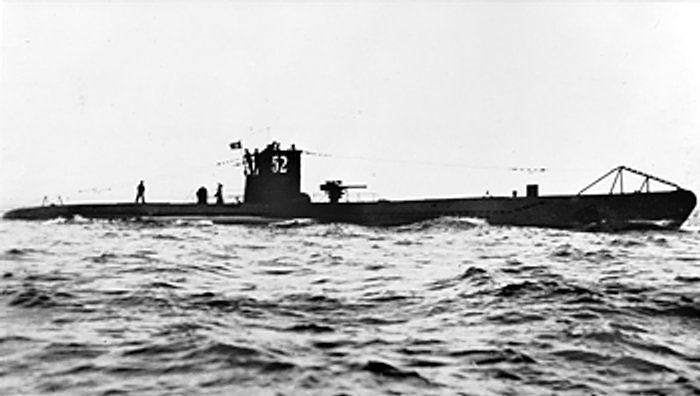
- U-52, a typical Type VIIB boat

History

Nazi Germany
- Name: U-54
- Ordered: 16 July 1937
- Builder: Germaniawerft, Kiel
- Cost: 4,439,000 Reichsmark
- Yard number: 589
- Laid down: 13 September 1938
- Launched: 15 August 1939
- Commissioned: 23 September 1939
- Fate: Sunk by a British mine around 13 February 1940 off Terschelling

General characteristics
- Class & type: Type VIIB U-boat
- Displacement: 753 t (741 long tons) surfaced; 857 t (843 long tons) submerged
- Length: 66.50 m (218 ft 2 in) o/a; 48.80 m (160 ft 1 in) pressure hull
- Beam: 6.20 m (20 ft 4 in) o/a; 4.70 m (15 ft 5 in) pressure hull
- Draught: 4.74 m (15 ft 7 in)
- Installed power: 2,800–3,200 PS (2,100–2,400 kW; 2,800–3,200 bhp) (diesels); 750 PS (550 kW; 740 shp) (electric)
- Propulsion: 2 shafts; 2 × diesel engines; 2 × electric motors
- Speed: 17.9 knots (33.2 km/h; 20.6 mph) surfaced; 8 knots (15 km/h; 9.2 mph) submerged
- Range: 8,700 nmi (16,112 km; 10,012 mi) at 10 knots (19 km/h; 12 mph)surfaced; 90 nmi (170 km; 100 mi) at 4 knots (7.4 km/h; 4.6 mph)
- Test depth: 230 m (750 ft); Calculated crush depth: 250–295 m (820–968 ft)
- Complement: 4 officers, 40–56 enlisted
- Sensors & processing systems: Gruppenhorchgerät
- Armament: 5 × 53.3 cm (21 in) torpedo tubes (four bow, one stern); 14 × torpedoes or 26 TMA mines; 1 × 8.8 cm (3.46 in) deck gun (220 rounds); 1 × 2 cm (0.79 in) C/30 anti-aircraft gun

Service record
- Part of: 7th U-boat Flotilla; 23 September – 13 February 1940
- Identification codes: M 02 062
- Commanders: Oblt.z.S. / Kptlt. Georg-Heinz Michel; 23 September – 30 November 1939; Kptlt. / K.Kapt. Günter Kutschmann; 5 December 1939 – 13 February 1940
- Operations: 1 patrol: 12 – 13 February 1940
- Victories: None

German submarine U-54 was a Type VIIB U-boat of Nazi Germany's Kriegsmarine during World War II.

== Design ==
German Type VIIB submarines were preceded by the shorter Type VIIA submarines. U-54 had a displacement of 753 tonnes (741 long tons) when at the surface and 857 tonnes (843 long tons) while submerged. She had a total length of 66.50 m (218 ft 2 in), a pressure hull length of 48.80 m (160 ft 1 in), a beam of 6.20 m (20 ft 4 in), a height of 9.50 m (31 ft 2 in), and a draught of 4.74 m (15 ft 7 in). The submarine was powered by two MAN M 6 V 40/46 four-stroke, six-cylinder supercharged diesel engines producing a total of 2,800 to 3,200 metric horsepower (2,060 to 2,350 kW; 2,760 to 3,160 shp) for use while surfaced, two BBC GG UB 720/8 double-acting electric motors producing a total of 750 metric horsepower (550 kW; 740 shp) for use while submerged. She had two shafts and two 1.23 m (4 ft) propellers. The boat was capable of operating at depths of up to 230 metres (750 ft).

The submarine had a maximum surface speed of 17.9 knots (33.2 km/h; 20.6 mph) and a maximum submerged speed of 8 knots (15 km/h; 9.2 mph). When submerged, the boat could operate for 90 nautical miles (170 km; 100 mi) at 4 knots (7.4 km/h; 4.6 mph); when surfaced, she could travel 8,700 nautical miles (16,100 km; 10,000 mi) at 10 knots (19 km/h; 12 mph). U-54 was fitted with five 53.3 cm (21 in) torpedo tubes (four fitted at the bow and one at the stern), fourteen torpedoes, one 8.8 cm (3.46 in) SK C/35 naval gun, 220 rounds, and one 2 cm (0.79 in) anti-aircraft gun The boat had a complement of between forty-four and sixty.

== Service history ==
She was ordered on 16 July 1937 and was laid down on 13 September 1938 at Friedrich Krupp Germaniawerft, Kiel, becoming yard number 589. She was launched on 15 August 1939 and commissioned under her first commander, Kapitänleutnant (Kptlt.) Georg-Heinz Michel, on 23 September of that year. Michel commanded her for her work-ups with the 7th U-boat Flotilla between 23 September and 30 November 1939. He was succeeded by Korvettenkapitän (K.Kapt.) Günter Kutschmann on 5 December, who completed the training programme by 31 December. She became an operational boat of the 7th Flotilla and set out for her first and only war patrol on 1 January 1940 in the North Sea. She did not record any successes during this cruise and was reported missing after failing to check in on 20 February.

She was probably lost with all hands after striking a mine in the mine barrages Field No. 4 or Field No. 6, which had been laid by the Royal Navy destroyers HMS Ivanhoe and Intrepid in early January 1940. This however has not been proven and the reason for her disappearance remains officially unknown. Part of one of her torpedoes was found on 14 March 1940 by the German patrol boat V 1101 Preußen in position 54°57′N 06°45′E.

== Bibliography ==
- Busch, Rainer; Röll, Hans-Joachim (1999). German U-boat commanders of World War II : a biographical dictionary. Translated by Brooks, Geoffrey. London, Annapolis, Md: Greenhill Books, Naval Institute Press. ISBN 1-55750-186-6.
- Busch, Rainer; Röll, Hans-Joachim (1999). Deutsche U-Boot-Verluste von September 1939 bis Mai 1945 [German U-boat losses from September 1939 to May 1945]. Der U-Boot-Krieg (in German). Vol. IV. Hamburg, Berlin, Bonn: Mittler. ISBN 3-8132-0514-2.
- Gröner, Erich; Jung, Dieter; Maass, Martin (1991). U-boats and Mine Warfare Vessels. German Warships 1815–1945. Vol. 2. Translated by Thomas, Keith; Magowan, Rachel. London: Conway Maritime Press. ISBN 0-85177-593-4.
