= HNLMS O 19 =

Dutch submarine (1936–1945)

Coordinates: 8°40′N 111°40′E

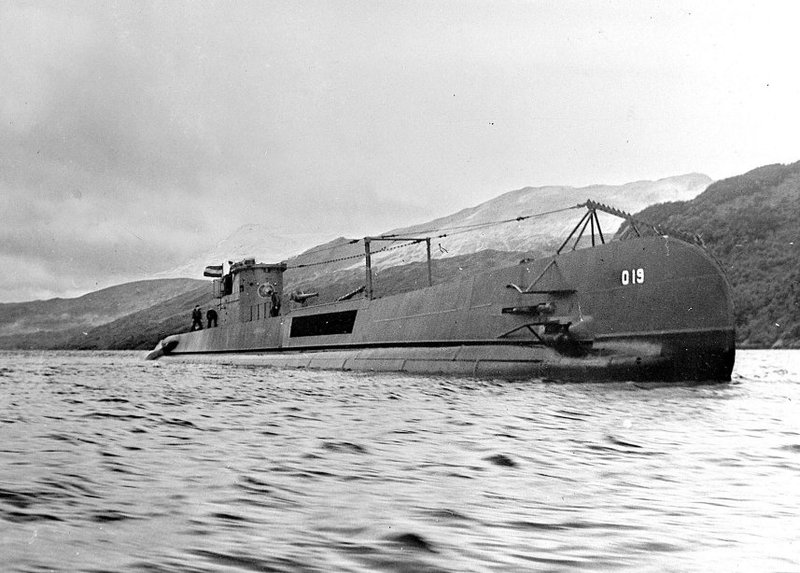
- O 19

History

Netherlands
- Name: O 19
- Builder: Wilton-Fijenoord, Rotterdam
- Laid down: 15 June 1936
- Launched: 22 September 1938
- Commissioned: 3 July 1939
- Fate: Scuttled on 10 July 1945

General characteristics
- Class & type: O 19-class submarine
- Displacement: 1109 tons surfaced; 1491 tons submerged
- Length: 80.7 m (264 ft 9 in)
- Beam: 7.41 m (24 ft 4 in)
- Draught: 3.87 m (12 ft 8 in)
- Propulsion: 2 × 2,650 bhp (1,976 kW) diesel engines; 2 × 500 bhp (373 kW) electric motors
- Speed: 19.5 kn (36.1 km/h; 22.4 mph) surfaced; 9 kn (17 km/h; 10 mph) submerged
- Range: 10,000 nmi (19,000 km; 12,000 mi) at 12 kn (22 km/h; 14 mph) on the surface; 27 nmi (50 km; 31 mi) at 8.5 kn (15.7 km/h; 9.8 mph) submerged
- Complement: 40
- Armament: 4 × 21 in (530 mm) bow torpedo tubes; 4 × 21 in (530 mm) stern torpedo tubes; 2 × external amidship mine tubes (10 mines each); 1 x 88 mm gun; 1 x 40 mm gun

O 19, laid down as K XIX, was an O 19-class submarine of the Royal Netherlands Navy that saw service during the Second World War. O 19, along with her sister ship O 20, were the first submarines in the world to be equipped with a submarine snorkel that allowed the submarine to run its diesel engines while submerged.

== Ship history ==
=== Commissioning ===
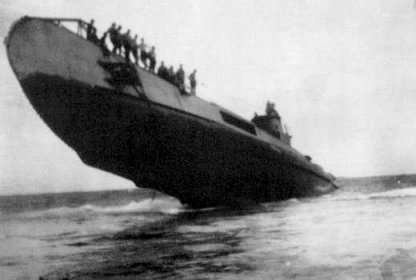
O 19 aground on Ladd Reef

The submarine's keel was laid at the Wilton-Fijenoord shipyard in Rotterdam on 15 June 1936 as K XIX but was renamed O 19 at some point. The submarine was launched on 22 September 1938 and commissioned in the Dutch navy on 3 July 1939. After her commissioning, HNLMS O 19 was put into service by the commander, Lieutenant-on-sea 1 (LTZ 1) K. van Dongen, on July 3, 1939, following a short training period. Three weeks later, on 25 July 1939, the new submarine was already on its way to the Dutch East Indies via the Suez Canal where the boat arrived on 13 September.

=== Second World War ===
On 10 May 1940, the day the Germans invaded the Netherlands, mobilisation was proclaimed in the Dutch colony. Most Dutch warships, including the O 19, were used to protect Allied merchant ships and to patrol the Indonesian archipelago. On 31 May 1941, the command of the Dutch submarine was taken over by LTZ 1, F.J.A. Knoops.

The submarine performed patrols and missions in the Pacific theater, sinking several Japanese vessels, attacking convoys and laying mines. In 1944 O 19 was placed under Task Force 71 of the United States Navy. On 16 November 1944 a Japanese coaster was spotted and sunk. On 8 July 1945, O 19 was en route to Subic Bay in the Philippines at a speed of 16 knots (30 km/h; 18 mph) when it struck Ladd Reef in the South China Sea. Unable to pull free of the reef, the crew of O 19 were rescued by the U.S. submarine USS Cod. To prevent capture, O 19 was scuttled by the crews using explosives, torpedoes and gunfire.

== Design ==
The diesel engines for the HNLMS O 19 was built under the license of the Swiss Sulzer by the Koninklijke Maatschappij De Schelde in Vlissingen. It had 40 mm Bofors guns, which could be stored in watertight compartments in front of and behind the command tower, just like the O 12-class submarines. O 19 was also equipped with noise pulses from Atlas Werke in Bremen, Germany, which at that time were considered the best in the world. In 1943, during a refit in Britain, the noise spanner of O 19 was replaced by an Asdic Type 120B.

== Summary of raiding history ==
Ships sunk by O 19.

Date	Ship	Flag	GRT	Fate
10 January 1942	Akita Maru	Japanese Empire	3,817	Sunk
15 January 1942	Tairu/Taieryu Maru	Japanese Empire	4,944	Sunk
10 September 1944	Korei Maru	Japanese Empire	599	Sunk
16 November 1944	Kaishin Maru No.2	Japanese Empire	150	Sunk
9 January 1945	Shinko Maru No.1	Japanese Empire	935	Auxiliary gunboat, sunk
10 April 1945	Hosei Maru	Japanese Empire	676	Tanker sunk
