= O 19-class submarine =

1939–1945 Dutch submarine class

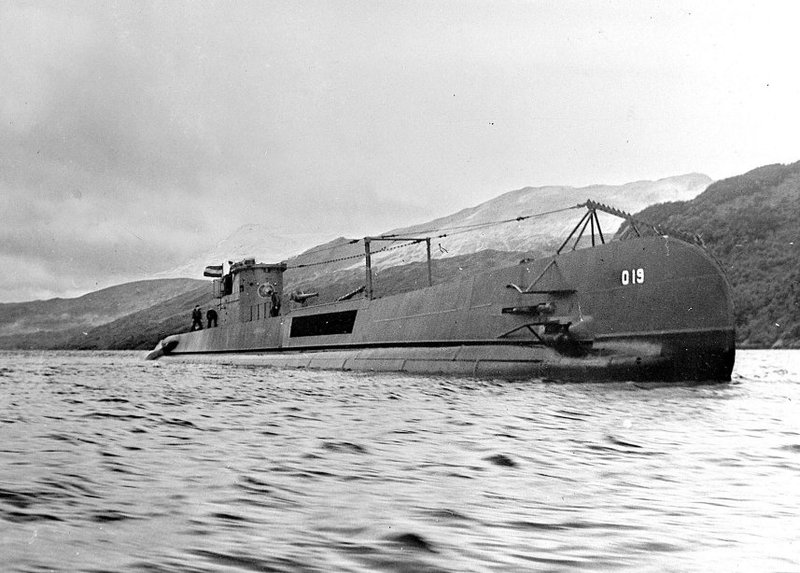
- HNLMS O 19

Class overview
- Name: O 19 class
- Builders: Wilton-Fijenoord, Rotterdam
- Operators: Royal Netherlands Navy
- Preceded by: O 16; K XIV class
- Succeeded by: O 21 class
- Built: 1936-1939
- In commission: 1939-1945
- Completed: 2
- Lost: 2

General characteristics
- Type: Submarine
- Displacement: 1109 tons surfaced; 1491 tons submerged
- Length: 80.7 m (265 ft)
- Beam: 7.41 m (24.3 ft)
- Draught: 3.87 m (12.7 ft)
- Propulsion: 2 × 2,650 bhp (1,976 kW) diesel engines; 2 × 500 bhp (373 kW) electric motors
- Speed: 19.5 kn (36.1 km/h; 22.4 mph) surfaced; 9 kn (17 km/h; 10 mph) submerged
- Range: 10,000 nmi (19,000 km; 12,000 mi) at 12 kn (22 km/h; 14 mph) on the surface; 27 nmi (50 km; 31 mi) at 8.5 kn (15.7 km/h; 9.8 mph) submerged
- Complement: 40
- Armament: 4 × 21 in (530 mm) bow torpedo tubes; 2 × 21 in (530 mm) stern torpedo tubes; 2 × 21 in (530 mm) midships torpedo tubes in a rotating mount; 10 × vertical mine tubes fitted on each beam (2 mines each - 40 mines total); 1 x 88 mm deck gun; 2 x 40 mm anti-aircraft guns

The O 19 class was a class of two submarines, built for the Royal Netherlands Navy by Fijenoord, Rotterdam. The ships were designed as submarine minelayer for operations in both European and colonies waters. The class comprised O 19 and O 20 and were the first submarines in the world to be equipped with a submarine snorkel that allowed the submarine to run its diesel engines while submerged. The submarines diving depth was 100 m (330 ft). These units were very similar to earlier Polish Orzeł class, with a reduced torpedo battery and 10 vertical mine tubes fitted on each beam.

== History ==
The two Dutch submarines of the O 19-class, which were built on June 15, 1936 at the yard of Wilton-Fijenoord in Schiedam, deviated in many ways from their predecessors. The boats were first planned as K XIX and K XX (K stands for submarines intended for Dutch Colonies) but during the construction it was decided that they were going to be put on the budget of the Department of War, which resulted in the names getting changed to O 19 and O 20. With that the ships were the first Dutch submarines that were not specifically built for Dutch or colonial waters, but would be intended for general service. The HNLMS O 19 and O 20 were put into service in 1939 following a short training period.

== Design ==
The design of the O 19-class submarines came from the Dutch engineer G. van Rooy and was partly based on that of the Polish submarines of the Orzel-class, which were built in the Netherlands at the same time. The O 19-class submarines were the first submarines built in the Netherlands that could lay mines and were equipped with 20 vertical minetubes, also called "minebuns". These minebuns, which were located outside the pressure-resistant double skin, could each accommodate two mines that could be discharged separately from each other hydraulically. The design of the minebuns came from the French shipyard Normand-Fenaux. The only mine-laying submarine that had been in service with the Royal Netherlands Navy was HNLMS M-1, a German U-boat that had run aground in the Wadden Sea during the First World War, was interned and later taken over from the Germans.

The diesel engines for the submarines of the O 19-class submarines were built under the license of the Swiss company Sulzer by the Koninklijke Maatschappij De Schelde in Vlissingen. Besides the ability to lay mines and fire torpedoes both submarines of the O 19-class were also equipped with 40mm Bofors machine guns, which could be stored in watertight compartments in front of and behind the command tower, just like the O 12-class submarines. When it comes to sonar the O 19-class submarines were equipped with noise pulses from the German company Atlas Werke, these were precursors of the Gruppenhorchgerät which were used by the famous U-boats during the Second World War. In 1943, during a major maintenance period in Great Britain, the noise spanner of the HNLMS O 19 was replaced by an Asdic system of type 120B.

== Boats ==
The ships were originally laid down as K XIX and K XX but later renamed O 19 and O 20.

Name	Laid down	Launched	Commissioned	Decommissioned
O 19	15 June 1936	22 September 1938	3 July 1939	10 July 1945 (scuttled)
O 20	15 June 1936	31 January 1939	28 August 1939	19 December 1941 (sunk/scuttled)
