= List of ship decommissionings in 1888 =

The list of ship decommissionings in 1888 is a chronological list of ships decommissioned in 1888. In cases where no official decommissioning ceremony was held, the date of withdrawal from service may be used instead. For ships lost at sea, see list of shipwrecks in 1888 instead.

Date	Operator	Ship	Pennant	Class and type	Fate and other notes
Unknown date	Spanish Navy	Vencedora	–	Screw corvette	Disarmed 1888
