= List of ship decommissionings in 1884 =

The list of ship decommissionings in 1884 is a chronological list of ships decommissioned in 1884. In cases where no official decommissioning ceremony was held, the date of withdrawal from service may be used instead. For ships lost at sea, see list of shipwrecks in 1884 instead.

Date	Operator	Ship	Pennant	Class and type	Fate and other notes	Ref
6 October	United States Navy	USS Nantucket		Passaic-class monitor	Placed in reserve until recommissioned in 1884	
Unknown date	Spanish Navy	Villa de Madrid		Screw frigate	Scrapped 1884	
