= List of ship decommissionings in 1916 =

The list of ship decommissionings in 1916 includes a chronological list of ships decommissioned in 1916. In cases where no official decommissioning ceremony was held, the date of withdrawal from service may be used instead. For ships lost at sea, see list of shipwrecks in 1916 instead.

Date	Operator	Ship	Pennant	Class and type	Fate and other notes
August	Imperial German Navy	SMS Wittelsbach		Wittelsbach-class battleship	Sold for scrap in 1921
