= List of ship decommissionings in 1886 =

The list of ship decommissionings in 1886 is a chronological list of ships decommissioned in 1886. In cases where no official decommissioning ceremony was held, the date of withdrawal from service may be used instead. For ships lost at sea, see list of shipwrecks in 1886 instead.

	Operator	Ship	Class and type	Fate	Other notes
April	Spanish Navy	Navas de Tolosa	Screw frigate	Stricken and scrapped 1893	
8 May	Spanish Navy	Doña María de Molina	Screw corvette	Hulked 1887; stricken 1894	
14 June	Spanish Navy	Méndez Núñez	Armored frigate	Stricken 1888, sold for scrapping 1896	Converted from the Lealtad-class screw frigate Resolución 1867–1870
23 October	United States Navy	USS Shenandoah	Sacramento-class screw sloop	Sold 30 July 1887	
Unknown date	Spanish Navy	Sagunto	Armored frigate	Placed in reserve, then hulked; stricken 1891; sold 1896; scrapped 1897	

== Bibliography ==
- Silverstone, Paul H. (2006). The New Navy 1883–1922. The U.S. Navy Warship Series. New York: Routledge. ISBN 978-0-415-97871-2.
