= List of shipwrecks in 1887 =

The list of shipwrecks in 1887 includes ships sunk, foundered, grounded, or otherwise lost during 1887.

table of contents
← 1886 / 1887 / 1888 →
Jan	Feb	Mar	Apr
May	Jun	Jul	Aug
Sep	Oct	Nov	Dec
Unknown date

== Unknown date ==
List of shipwrecks: Unknown date 1887
Ship	State	Description
Atalante	France	The Alma-class ironclad sank at Saigon, French Indo-China.
Elborous	Russia	The war vessel sank following a collision with an English steamer near Nicolaieff. Seven of the crew drowned.
Novelty	New Zealand	The steam ship was wrecked off Quail Island, in Lyttelton Harbour.
Temple Bar	United Kingdom	The ship was wrecked at Cardiff, Glamorgan with the loss of all hands between 28 October and 1 November. She was on a voyage from Penarth, Glamorgan to Rio de Janeiro, Brazil.
Wan Nien Ch'ing	Imperial Chinese Navy	The sloop-of-war was sunk in a collision.
