= List of ship commissionings in 1862 =

The list of ship commissionings in 1862 is a chronological list of ships commissioned in 1862. In cases where no official commissioning ceremony was held, the date of service entry may be used instead.

Date	Operator	Ship	Class and type	Notes
April	Spanish Navy	Nuestra Señora del Triunfo	Lealtad-class screw frigate	
25 June	Royal Danish Navy	HDMS Absalon	Third-class cruiser	
28 August	Spanish Navy	Resolución	Lealtad-class screw frigate	Converted to armored frigate Méndez Núñez 1867–1870
25 November	United States Navy	USS Passaic	Passaic-class monitor	Lead ship of her class
14 December	United States Navy	USS Montauk	Passaic-class monitor	At New York City with Commander John L. Worden in command
December 29	United States Navy	USS Nahant	Passaic-class monitor	
Unknown date	Spanish Navy	Nuestra Señora del Carmén	Concepción-class screw frigate	
Unknown date	Spanish Navy	Vencedora	Screw corvette	
