= List of ship decommissionings in 1935 =

The list of ship decommissionings in 1935 is a chronological list of ships decommissioned in 1935. In cases where no official decommissioning ceremony was held, the date of withdrawal from service may be used instead. For ships lost at sea, see list of shipwrecks in 1935 instead.

Date	Operator	Ship	Class and type	Fate and other notes
1 August	Regia Marina	F6	F-class submarine	Scrapped
1 August	Regia Marina	F13	F-class submarine	Scrapped
24 September	Royal Australian Navy	HMAS Brisbane	Training ship, previously light cruiser	Scrapped 1936
December (Unknown date)	Portuguese Navy	NRP Foca	Foca-class submarine	Stricken date. Later scrapped.
Unknown date	(United Kingdom) Cunard-White Star Line	RMS Olympic	Olympic class	Due to Great Depression and financial losses. Scrapped.
