= List of ship commissionings in 1890 =

The list of ship commissionings in 1890 is a chronological list of ships commissioned in 1890. In cases where no official commissioning ceremony was held, the date of service entry may be used instead..

	Operator	Ship	Class and type	Pennant	Notes
March	Royal Navy	HMS Victoria	Victoria-class battleship	–	
2 June	United States Navy	USS Vesuvius	Dynamite gun cruiser	–	
Unknown date	Spanish Navy	Vitoria	Armored frigate	–	Previously in commission 1868–1887

== Bibliography ==
- Roberts, John (1979). "Great Britain (including Empire Forces)". In Chesneau, Roger & Kolesnik, Eugene M. (eds.). Conway's All the World's Fighting Ships 1860–1905. New York: Mayflower Books. pp. 1–113. ISBN 0-8317-0302-4.
