= List of ship commissionings in 1993 =

The list of ship commissionings in 1993 includes a chronological list of all ships commissioned in 1993.

	Operator	Ship	Flag	Class and type	Pennant	Other notes
26 February	Royal Netherlands Navy	Tjerk Hiddes		Karel Doorman-class frigate	F830	
23 May	Royal Netherlands Navy	Van Amstel		Karel Doorman-class frigate	F831	
6 June	Islamic Republic of Iran Navy	Noah		Kilo-class submarine	902	
13 June	United States Navy	Cape St. George		Ticonderoga-class cruiser	CG-71	
24 July	United States Navy	Lake Erie		Ticonderoga-class cruiser	CG-70	
16 October	United States Navy	Kearsarge		Wasp-class amphibious assault ship	LHD-3	
11 December	Royal Australian Navy	Newcastle		Adelaide-class frigate	FFG 06	
15 December	Royal Netherlands Navy	Abraham van der Hulst		Karel Doorman-class frigate	F832	
Date uncertain	People's Liberation Army Navy	Zhanjiang		Type 051 destroyer	165	Date of initial operational capability
