= List of ship commissionings in 1887 =

The list of ship commissionings in 1887 is a chronological list of ships commissioned in 1887. In cases where no official commissioning ceremony was held, the date of service entry may be used instead.

	Operator	Ship	Flag	Class and type	Pennant	Other notes
19 January	Spanish Navy	Destructor		Torpedo gunboat		Also considered the world's first destroyer.
