= List of ship decommissionings in 1974 =

The list of ship decommissionings in 1974 is a chronological list of ships decommissioned in 1974.

| Date | Operator | Ship | Class and type | Fate | Other notes |
|---|---|---|---|---|---|
| 15 March | United States Navy | Intrepid | Essex-class aircraft carrier | Museum ship | Intrepid Sea, Air & Space Museum |
| Date uncertain | French Navy | Arromanches | Colossus-class aircraft carrier | Broken up at Toulon in 1978 | |

== Bibliography ==
- "Intrepid IV (CV-11)". Dictionary of American Naval Fighting Ships. Navy Department, Naval History and Heritage Command.
