= List of ship commissionings in 2015 =

The list of ship commissionings in 2015 includes a chronological list of all ships commissioned in 2015.

	Operator	Ship	Flag	Class and type	Pennant	Other notes
9 March	Islamic Republic of Iran Navy	Damavand		Moudge-class frigate	77	
1 August	United States Navy	John Warner		Virginia-class submarine	SSN-785	
