= List of ship commissionings in 1897 =

The list of ship commissionings in 1897 is a chronological list of ships commissioned in 1897. In cases where no official commissioning ceremony was held, the date of service entry may be used instead.

Date	Operator	Ship	Flag	Class and type	Pennant	Other notes
16 February	French Navy	Jauréguiberry		Pre-dreadnought battleship	–	
20 February	French Navy	Charles Martel		Pre-dreadnought battleship	–	
8 June	Royal Navy	HMS Renown	–	Pre-dreadnought battleship	–	
8 June	Royal Navy	HMS Jupiter		Majestic-class battleship	–	
8 June	Royal Navy	HMS Mars		Majestic-class battleship	–	
16 June	United States Navy	USS Iowa		Pre-dreadnought battleship	BB-4	
July	French Navy	Carnot		Pre-dreadnought battleship	–	
17 August	Imperial Japanese Navy	Fuji		Fuji-class battleship	–	
9 September	Imperial Japanese Navy	Yashima		Fuji-class battleship	–	
29 December	Spanish Navy	Plutón		Furor-class destroyer	–	
