= List of ship commissionings in 1879 =

The list of ship commissionings in 1879 includes a chronological list of all ships commissioned in 1879.

	Operator	Ship	Flag	Class and type	Pennant	Other notes
15 February	Royal Navy	Dreadnought		Ironclad battleship		

== Bibliography ==
- Roberts, John (1979). "Great Britain (including Empire Forces)". In Chesneau, Roger & Kolesnik, Eugene M. (eds.). Conway's All the World's Fighting Ships 1860–1905. New York: Mayflower Books. pp. 1–113. ISBN 0-8317-0302-4.
