= List of ship decommissionings in 1920 =

The list of ship decommissionings in 1920 includes a chronological list of all ships decommissioned in 1920. In cases where no official commissioning ceremony was held, the date of service entry may be used instead. For ships lost at sea, see list of shipwrecks in 1920 instead.

	Operator	Ship	Class and type	Fate	Other notes
7 May	United States Navy	Alabama	Illinois-class battleship	Target ship	
10 May	United States Navy	Kearsarge	Kearsarge-class battleship	Converted to a crane ship, became Crane Ship 1 (AB-1)	Scrapped in 1955
15 May	United States Navy	Wisconsin	Illinois-class battleship	Sold for scrap in 1924	
29 May	United States Navy	Kentucky	Kearsarge-class battleship	Sold for scrap in 1924	
30 September	Royal Australian Navy	Encounter	Second class protected cruiser	Converted to an accommodation ship	
October	Imperial German Navy	Roon	Armored cruiser	Scrapped	

== Bibliography ==
- Silverstone, Paul H. (2006). The New Navy 1883–1922. The U.S. Navy Warship Series. New York: Routledge. ISBN 978-0-415-97871-2.
