= List of ship commissionings in 1858 =

The list of ship commissionings in 1858 is a chronological list of ships commissioned in 1858. In cases where no official commissioning ceremony was held, the date of service entry may be used instead.

| | Operator | Ship | Class and type | Pennant | Other notes |
|---|---|---|---|---|---|
| February | Spanish Navy | Petronila | Petronila-class screw frigate | – | |
