= List of ship decommissionings in 1933 =

The list of ship decommissionings in 1933 is a chronological list of ships decommissioned in 1933. In cases where no official decommissioning ceremony was held, the date of withdrawal from service may be used instead. For ships lost at sea, see list of shipwrecks in 1933 instead.

	Operator	Ship	Class and type	Fate	Other notes
26 April	Royal Australian Navy	HMAS Albatros	Seaplane tender	Transferred to the Royal Navy in 1938	
7 June	United States Navy	USS Advance	Harbor tug	Sold 1934	
