= List of ship decommissionings in 1914 =

The list of ship decommissionings in 1914 includes a chronological list of ships decommissioned in 1914. In cases where no official decommissioning ceremony was held, the date of withdrawal from service may be used instead. For ships lost at sea, see list of shipwrecks in 1914 instead.

Date	Operator	Ship	Pennant	Class and type	Fate and other notes
May	Austro-Hungarian Navy	SMS Leopard	-	torpedo cruiser	Recommissioned May 1914; Ceded to the British after World War I
23 May 1914	United States Navy	USS Indiana (BB-1)	BB-1	Indiana-class battleship (lead)	Recommissioned 24 May 1917; Sunk as target 1 November 1920
