= List of ship commissionings in 1977 =

The list of ship commissionings in 1977 includes a chronological list of all ships commissioned in 1977.

	Operator	Ship	Flag	Class and type	Pennant	Other notes
3 March	Aarhus-Oslo Linie	Peer Günt (Note: In the Miramar Ship Index, the vessel is registered as Peer Gynt.)	West Germany	Ferry		Former Sveaborg with Rederi AB Svea
16 April	United States Navy	Arthur W. Radford		Spruance-class destroyer	DD-968	
28 April	Finnlines	Finnjet	Finland	Cruiseferry		Largest, longest and fastest ferry in the world.
25 June	United States Navy	Baton Rouge		Los Angeles-class submarine	SSN-689	
9 July	United States Navy	Peterson		Spruance-class destroyer	DD-969	
10 September	United States Navy	Texas		Virginia-class cruiser	CGN-39	
1 October	United States Navy	Caron		Spruance-class destroyer	DD-970	
15 October	United States Navy	Saipan		Tarawa-class amphibious assault ship	LHA-2	
18 October	United States Navy	Dwight D. Eisenhower		Nimitz-class aircraft carrier	CVN-69	
7 November	Jakob Lines	Borea	Finland	Ferry		Ex-Bore with Steamship Company Bore
3 December	United States Navy	O'Brien		Spruance-class destroyer	DD-975	
