= List of ship commissionings in 1997 =

The list of ship commissionings in 1997 includes a chronological list of all ships commissioned in 1997.

	Operator	Ship	Flag	Class and type	Pennant	Other notes
19 April	United States Navy	The Sullivans		Arleigh Burke-class destroyer	DDG-68	
29 May	Royal Navy	Grafton		Type 23 frigate	F80	
28 June	United States Navy	Ross		Arleigh Burke-class destroyer	DDG-71	
30 June	Royal Navy	Scott		Scott-class ocean survey vessel	H131	
4 July	Royal Navy	Sutherland		Type 23 frigate	F81	
6 September	United States Navy	Hopper		Arleigh Burke-class destroyer	DDG-70	
20 September	United States Navy	Bataan		Wasp-class amphibious assault ship	LHD-5	
