= List of ship decommissionings in 1996 =

The list of ship decommissionings in 1996 includes a chronological list of all ships decommissioned in 1996.

| Date | Operator | Ship | Flag | Class and type | Fate | Other notes |
|---|---|---|---|---|---|---|
| 31 July | Soviet Navy | Bditelnyy | | Project 1135 large anti-submarine ship | Scrapped | |
| 9 August | United States Navy | America | | Kitty Hawk-class aircraft carrier | Scuttled 2005 | |

== Bibliography ==
- Friedman, Norman (2022) [1983]. U. S. Aircraft Carriers: An Illustrated Design History (Revised ed.). Annapolis, Maryland: Naval Institute Press. ISBN 978-1-68247-762-5.
