= List of ship commissionings in 1891 =

The list of ship commissionings in 1891 is a chronological list of ships commissioned in 1891. In cases where no official commissioning ceremony was held, the date of service entry may be used instead.

	Operator	Ship	Flag	Class and type	Pennant	Other notes
18 April	French Navy	Marceau		Marceau-class ironclad	–	
30 June	Norway	Kommandøren		Passenger/cargo ship	–	
30 June	Royal Navy	HMS Nile	–	Trafalgar-class battleship	–	
8 July	Royal Navy	HMS Sans Pareil		Victoria-class battleship	–	
