= List of ship commissionings in 1953 =

The list of ship commissionings in 1953 includes a chronological list of all ships commissioned in 1953.

	Operator	Ship	Class and type	Pennant	Other notes
2 January	United States Navy	Yorktown	Essex-class aircraft carrier	CVA-10	Recommissioned from reserve
1 July	United States Navy	Randolph	Essex-class aircraft carrier	CVA-15	Recommissioned from reserve
1 October	United States Navy	Hornet	Essex-class aircraft carrier	CVA-12	Recommissioned from reserve
18 November	Royal Netherlands Navy	De Ruyter	De Zeven Provinciën-class cruiser	C801	
17 December	Royal Netherlands Navy	De Zeven Provinciën	De Zeven Provinciën-class cruiser	C802	

== Bibliography ==
- Jordan, John (1995). "Netherlands". In Chumbley, Stephen (ed.). Conway's All The World's Fighting Ships 1947–1995. Annapolis, Maryland: Naval Institute Press. pp. 269–283. ISBN 1-55750-132-7.
