= List of ship decommissionings in 1911 =

The list of ship decommissionings in 1911 includes a chronological list of ships decommissioned in 1911. In cases where no official decommissioning ceremony was held, the date of withdrawal from service may be used instead. For ships lost at sea, see list of shipwrecks in 1911 instead.

Date	Operator	Ship	Pennant	Class and type	Fate and other notes
25 May	Regia Marina	Andrea Doria	-	Ruggiero di Lauria-class ironclad battleship	decommissioned in 1911, and served as the floating battery GR104 during World War I before being scrapped in 1929.
-	Imperial German Navy	Schwaben	-	Wittelsbach-class battleship	decommissioned in Wilhelmshaven on 30 December 1911 and assigned to the Reserve Division in the North Sea. She was placed back in service briefly from 9 to 12 May 1912 to move to Kiel. Schwaben returned to service again to participate in the autumn maneuvers from 14 August to 28 September Stricken from the naval register on 8 March 1921. Sold for 3,090,000 marks and broken up for scrap that year in Kiel-Nordmole.
