= List of ship commissionings in 1893 =

The list of ship commissionings in 1893 is a chronological list of ships commissioned in 1893. In cases where no official commissioning ceremony was held, the date of service entry may be used instead.

Date	Operator	Ship	Flag	Class and type	Pennant	Other notes
1 June	Royal Navy	HMS Hood		Royal Sovereign-class battleship	–	
11 September	Royal Navy	HMS Empress of India		Royal Sovereign-class battleship	–	
17 October	Royal Navy	HMS Ramillies		Royal Sovereign-class battleship	–	
31 October	Imperial German Navy	SMS Wörth		Brandenburg-class battleship	–	
19 November	Imperial German Navy	SMS Brandenburg		Brandenburg-class battleship	–	
5 December	Royal Navy	HMS Resolution		Royal Sovereign-class battleship	–	
