= List of ship commissionings in 1954 =

The list of ship commissionings in 1954 is a chronological list of ships commissioned in 1954.

	Operator	Ship	Class and type	Pennant	Other notes
1 March	United States Navy	Hancock	Essex-class aircraft carrier	CVA-19	Recommissioned from reserve
3 June	United States Navy	Dealey	Dealey-class destroyer escort	DE-1006	
20 June	United States Navy	Intrepid	Essex-class aircraft carrier	CVA-11	Recommissioned from reserve
16 September	Spanish Navy	Almirante Lobo	Transport	A-41	
17 September	United States Navy	Thomaston	Thomaston-class dock landing ship	LSD-28	
1 October	United States Navy	Ticonderoga	Essex-class aircraft carrier	CVA-14	Recommissioned from reserve

== Bibliography ==
- Friedman, Norman (1995). "United States". In Chumbley, Stephen (ed.). Conway's All The World's Fighting Ships 1947–1995. Annapolis, Maryland: Naval Institute Press. pp. 544–634. ISBN 1-55750-132-7.
