= List of ship decommissionings in 2010 =

The list of ship decommissionings in 2010 includes a chronological list of ships decommissioned in 2010.

	Operator	Ship	Flag	Class and type	Pennant	Fate	Other notes
11 February	Royal Navy	Nottingham		Type 42 Destroyer	D91	Scrapped	
15 April	Royal Navy	Roebuck		Ocean survey ship	H130	Sold to Bangladesh	
15 October	Royal Navy	Walney		Sandown Class Minehunter	M104	Awaiting disposal	
