= List of ship decommissionings in 1918 =

The list of ship decommissionings in 1918 includes a chronological list of ships decommissioned in 1918. In cases where no official commissioning ceremony was held, the date of service entry may be used instead. For ships lost at sea, see list of shipwrecks in 1918 instead.

Date	Operator	Ship	Pennant	Class and type	Fate and other notes
January 2	United States Navy	Arroyo	SP-197	Section patrol craft	Recommissioned 18 April 1918
November 15	United States Navy	Avis	SP-382	Section patrol craft	Returned to pre–World War I civilian owner
November 29	United States Navy	Arawan II	SP-1	Section patrol craft	Returned to pre–World War I civilian owner
November	United States Navy	Acoma	SP-1228	Section patrol craft	Returned to pre–World War I civilian owner
December 2	United States Navy	A. G. Prentiss	ID-2413	Tugboat	returned to owner
December 16	United States Navy	Arroyo	SP-197	Section patrol craft	Returned to pre–World War I civilian owner
December 19	United States Navy	Avenger	SP-2646	Section patrol craft	Returned to pre–World War I civilian owner
December	United States Navy	Abalone	SP-208	Section patrol craft	Returned to pre–World War I civilian owner
unknown date	United States Navy	Annabelle	SP-1206	Section patrol craft	Returned to pre–World War I civilian owner
unknown date	United States Navy	Arabia	ID-3434	Section patrol craft	Sold
