= List of ship commissionings in 2011 =

The list of ship commissionings in 2011 includes a chronological list of all ships commissioned in 2011.

	Operator	Ship	Flag	Class and type	Pennant	Other notes
16 March	Japan Maritime Self-Defense Force	Ise		Hyūga-class helicopter destroyer	DDH-182	
6 May	Royal Navy	Diamond		Type 45 destroyer	D34	
19 May	United States Navy	William P. Lawrence		Arleigh Burke-class destroyer	DDG-110	
30 May	People's Liberation Army Navy	Changzhou		Type 054A frigate	549	
9 June	People's Liberation Army Navy	Yantai		Type 054A frigate	538	
23 June	Royal Navy	Protector			A173	
1 September	United States Navy	Spruance		Arleigh Burke-class destroyer	DDG-111	
29 October	United States Navy	California		Virginia-class submarine	SSN-781	
30 October	People's Liberation Army Navy	Jinggang Shan		Type 071 amphibious transport dock	999	
