= List of ship commissionings in 1866 =

The list of ship commissionings in 1866 is a chronological list of ships commissioned in 1866. In cases where no official commissioning ceremony was held, the date of service entry may be used instead.

Date	Operator	Ship	Pennant	Class and type	Notes
March	Spanish Navy	Navas de Tolosa	–	Screw frigate	
June	Spanish Navy	Tetuán	–	Armored frigate	
