= List of ship decommissionings in 2017 =

The list of ship decommissionings in 2017 includes a chronological list of ships decommissioned in 2017.

	Operator	Ship	Flag	Class and type	Pennant	Fate	Other notes
6 March	Royal Fleet Auxiliary	Gold Rover		Rover Class Tanker	A271	Scrapped	
27 October	Royal Navy	Severn		River Class OPV	P282	Recommissioned in 2020	
14 December	Royal Navy	Atherstone		Hunt Class mine countermeasures vessel	M38	Awaiting disposal	
14 December	Royal Navy	Quorn		Hunt Class mine countermeasures vessel	M41	Sold to Lithuania, awaiting reactivation as of January 2021	
