= List of ship commissionings in 1876 =

The list of ship commissionings in 1862 includes a chronological list of all ships commissioned in 1862.

Date	Operator	Ship	Class and type	Pennant	Other notes
10 January	United States Navy	Vandalia	Screw sloop		
3 October	United States Navy	Essex	Wooden screw steamer		
24 November	United States Navy	Passaic	Passaic-class monitor		Second commissioning
27 November	United States Navy	Ranger	Steamship		Later renamed Rockport, then Nantucket

== Bibliography ==
- Silverstone, Paul H. (2006). Civil War Navies 1855–1883. The U.S. Navy Warship Series. New York: Routledge. ISBN 978-0-415-97870-5.
