= List of ship decommissionings in 1955 =

The list of ship decommissionings in 1955 includes a chronological list of all ships decommissioned in 1955. In cases where no official decommissioning ceremony was held, the date of withdrawal from service may be used instead. For ships lost at sea, see list of shipwrecks in 1955 instead.

	Operator	Ship	Class and type	Fate	Other notes
15 January	United States Navy	Gilbert Islands	Commencement Bay-class escort carrier	Reserve	Recommissioned as USS Annapolis
21 January	United States Navy	Cabot	Independence-class anti-submarine carrier	Reserve	Transferred to Spain in 1967 and renamed Dedalo
18 February	United States Navy	Bairoko	Commencement Bay-class escort carrier	Scrapped	Reserve until stricken in 1960
30 June	United States Navy	Rendova	Commencement Bay-class escort carrier	Scrapped	Reserve until stricken in 1971
4 August	United States Navy	Mindoro	Commencement Bay-class escort carrier	Scrapped	Reserve until stricken in 1959
12 August	Royal Australian Navy	HMAS Vengeance	Colossus-class light aircraft carrier	Returned to the United Kingdom	
15 December	United States Navy	Kula Gulf	Commencement Bay-class escort carrier	Reserve	Activated by the Military Sea Transportation Service in 1965

== Bibliography ==
- "Kula Gulf (CVE-108)". Dictionary of American Naval Fighting Ships. Navy Department, Naval History and Heritage Command.
