= List of ship commissionings in 1952 =

The list of ship commissionings in 1952 includes a chronological list of all ships commissioned in 1952.

	Operator	Ship	Class and type	Pennant	Other notes
5 January	United States Military Sea Transportation Service	Tripoli	Casablanca-class aircraft transport	CVE-64	Placed in service from United States Navy reserve
1 February	United States Navy	Lake Champlain	Essex-class aircraft carrier	CVA-39	Recommissioned from reserve
13 November	Royal Australian Navy	Vengeance	Colossus-class aircraft carrier		HMS Vengeance leased from the United Kingdom
