= List of ship decommissionings in 2019 =

The list of ship decommissionings in 2019 includes a chronological list of ships decommissioned in 2019.

| | Operator | Ship | Flag | Class and type | Pennant | Fate | Other notes |
|---|---|---|---|---|---|---|---|
| 6 May | Indian Navy | Ranjit | | Rajput-class destroyer | D53 | | |
| 15 August | Indonesian Navy | Teluk Ratai | | Teluk Langsa-class tank landing ship | 509 | | |
| 15 August | Indonesian Navy | Teluk Bone | | Teluk Langsa-class tank landing ship | 511 | | |
| 16 August | Indonesian Navy | Teluk Penyu | | Teluk Semangka-class tank landing ship | 513 | | |
| 16 August | Indonesian Navy | Slamet Riyadi | | Ahmad Yani-class frigate | 352 | | |
| 16 August | Indonesian Navy | Ki Hajar Dewantara | | Dewantara-class corvette | 364 | | |
| 20 December | Royal Navy | Clyde | | River-class offshore patrol vessel | P257 | Sold to Bahrain | |
