= List of ship commissionings in 1896 =

The list of ship commissionings in 1896 is a chronological list of ships commissioned in 1896. In cases where no official commissioning ceremony was held, the date of service entry may be used instead.

Date	Operator	Ship	Flag	Class and type	Pennant	Other notes
11 January	French Navy	Brennus		Pre-dreadnought battleship	–	
14 January	Royal Navy	HMS Revenge		Royal Sovereign-class battleship	–	
14 January	Royal Navy	HMS Royal Oak		Royal Sovereign-class battleship	–	
10 June	United States Navy	USS Massachusetts		Indiana-class battleship	BB-2	
15 July	United States Navy	USS Oregon		Indiana-class battleship	BB-3	
15 October	Imperial German Navy	SMS Ägir		Odin-class coastal defense ship	–	
4 November	Royal Navy	HMS Victorious		Majestic-class battleship	–	
26 November	Royal Navy	HMS Prince George		Majestic-class battleship	–	
16 December	Spanish Navy	Furor		Furor-class destroyer	–	
17 December	Spanish Navy	Terror		Furor-class destroyer	–	
