= List of ship commissionings in 1885 =

The list of ship commissionings in 1885 is a chronological list of ships commissioned in 1885. In cases where no official commissioning ceremony was held, the date of service entry may be used instead.

	Operator	Ship	Flag	Class and type	Pennant	Other notes
1 March	Imperial Chinese Navy	Zhenyuan		Turret ship		
29 October	Imperial Chinese Navy	Dingyuan		Turret ship		Flagship of the fleet
1 December	Imperial Japanese Navy	Naniwa		protected cruiser		
1 December	Imperial Japanese Navy	Takachiho		protected cruiser		

== Bibliography ==
- Watts, A. J. (1979). "Japan". In Chesneau, Roger & Kolesnik, Eugene M. (eds.). Conway's All the World's Fighting Ships 1860–1905. New York: Mayflower Books. pp. 216–239. ISBN 0-8317-0302-4.
