= List of ship decommissionings in 1925 =

The list of ship decommissionings in 1925 is a chronological list of ships decommissioned in 1925. In cases where no official decommissioning ceremony was held, the date of withdrawal from service may be used instead. For ships lost at sea, see list of shipwrecks in 1924 instead.

| Date | Operator | Ship | Class and type | Fate and other notes |
|---|---|---|---|---|
| 1 January | Spanish Navy | Osado | Furor-class destroyer | Scrapped 1925 |
