= List of ship decommissionings in 1869 =

The list of ship decommissionings in 1869 includes a chronological list of all ships decommissioned in 1869.

Date	Operator	Ship	Pennant	Class and type	Fate and other notes
June 2	United States Navy	Galena		Screw steamer	Broken up
June 30	United States Navy	Scylla		Canonicus-class monitor	To reserve until recommissioned in 1872
September 18	United States Navy	Aroostook		Steamer	Sold
