= List of ship commissionings in 2000 =

The list of ship commissionings in 2000 includes a chronological list of all ships commissioned in 2000.

Date	Operator	Ship	Pennant	Class and type	Notes
April 20	United States Navy	1st Lt. Harry L. Martin	T-AK-3015	1st Lt. Harry L. Martin class dry cargo ship	Ex-Tarago merchant cargo ship; under Military Sealift Command direction
June 8	Royal Navy	Kent	F78	Type 23 frigate	
July 26	Royal Navy	Bangor	M109	Sandown-class minehunter	
September	Royal Navy	Ramsey	M110	Sandown-class minehunter	
14 October	United States Navy	Roosevelt	DDG-80	Arleigh Burke-class destroyer	
November 15	Brazilian Navy	São Paulo	A12	Clemenceau-class aircraft carrier	Ex-French Foch
