= List of ship decommissionings in 2012 =

The list of ship decommissionings in 2012 includes a chronological list of ships decommissioned in 2012.

	Operator	Ship	Flag	Class and type	Pennant	Fate	Other notes
30 March	Royal Navy	Liverpool		Type 42 Destroyer	D92	Scrapped	
14 July	Royal Navy	Turbulent		Trafalgar Class submarine	S87	Awaiting disposal	
27 September	Royal Navy	York		Type 42 Destroyer	D98	Scrapped	
