= List of ship decommissionings in 1978 =

The list of ship decommissionings in 1978 includes a chronological list of all ships decommissioned in 1978.

	Operator	Ship	Flag	Class and type	Fate	Other notes
9 January	Finnlines	Finnhansa	Finland	ferry	Sold to Birka Line	Renamed Prisessan
February	La Traverse Nord-Sud Ltd	Manic	Canada	ferry	Sold to Kefalliniki Sa	Renamed Ainos
13 March	Sessan Linjen	Fennia	Finland	ferry	End of charter, returned to Svea Line (Finland)	Laid up until April
10 May	Polferries	Aallotar	Poland	ferry	End of charter from Effoa, purchased by Polferries	Renamed Rogalin
28 July	Royal Navy	Devonshire		County-class destroyer		
9 November	Aarhus-Oslo Linie	Peer Günt	Sweden	ferry	Sold to Stena Line	Renamed Stena Baltica

== Bibliography ==
- Friedman, Norman (2006). British Destroyers and Frigates, the Second World War and After. Annapolis, Maryland: Naval Institute Press. ISBN 1-86176-137-6.
