= List of ship decommissionings in 1963 =

The list of ship decommissionings in 1963 includes a chronological list of all ships decommissioned in 1963. In cases where no official decommissioning ceremony was held, the date of withdrawal from service may be used instead. For ships lost at sea, see list of shipwrecks in 1963 instead.

Date	Operator	Ship	Flag	Class and type	Fate	Other notes
8 May	United States Navy	Antietam	United States	Essex-class aircraft carrier	Reserve until stricken in 1963; scrapped	
31 August	Rederi AB Gotland	Drotten	Sweden	Passenger ship	Laid up; sold to Rederi Ab Vikinglinjen in January 1964	
December	Spanish Navy	Méndez Núñez	Spain	Blas de Lezo-class light cruiser	Sold and scrapped 1964	
Unknown date	United States Fish and Wildlife Service	Penguin II	United States	Cargo liner	Sold 18 August 1964; extant 1976	

== Bibliography ==
"Antietam II (CV-36)". Dictionary of American Naval Fighting Ships. Navy Department, Naval History and Heritage Command.
