= List of ship decommissionings in 1956 =

The list of ship decommissionings in 1956 includes a chronological list of all ships decommissioned in 1956. In cases where no official decommissioning ceremony was held, the date of withdrawal from service may be used instead. For ships lost at sea, see list of shipwrecks in 1956 instead.

	Operator	Ship	Class and type	Fate	Other notes
16 January	United States Navy	Monterey	Independence-class anti-submarine carrier	Scrapped	Reserve until stricken in 1970
3 June	United States Navy	Siboney	Commencement Bay-class escort carrier	Scrapped	Reserve until stricken in 1970
31 August	United States Navy	Point Cruz	Commencement Bay-class escort carrier	Reserve	Reactivated by the Military Sea Transportation Service in 1965
Date uncertain	Royal Canadian Navy	Magnificent	Majestic-class aircraft carrier	Scrapped	

== Bibliography ==
- Cressman, Robert J. (11 October 2023). "Monterey III (CVL-26)". Dictionary of American Naval Fighting Ships. Navy Department, Naval History and Heritage Command.
