= List of ship commissionings in 2002 =

The list of ship commissionings in 2002 includes a chronological list of all ships commissioned in 2002.

	Operator	Ship	Flag	Class and type	Pennant	Other notes
11 April	Indian Navy	Prabal		Veer-class corvette	K92	
26 April	Royal Netherlands Navy	De Zeven Provinciën		De Zeven Provinciën-class frigate	F802	First in class
6 June	Royal Navy	St Albans		Type 23 frigate	F83	
22 June	United States Navy	Shoup		Arleigh Burke-class destroyer	DDG-86	
17 August	United States Navy	McCampbell		Arleigh Burke-class destroyer	DDG-85	
17 August	Royal Australian Navy	Stuart		Anzac-class frigate	FFH 153	
19 September	Spanish Navy	Álvaro de Bazán		Álvaro de Bazán-class frigate	F-101	First in class
9 November	United States Navy	Preble		Arleigh Burke-class destroyer	DDG-88	
18 November	(Malta) Maritime Squadron AFM	P51		Protector-class coastal patrol boat	P51	First in class
18 December	Indian Navy	Pralaya		Veer-class corvette	K91	
