= List of ship commissionings in 1869 =

The list of ship commissionings in 1869 is a chronological list of ships commissioned in 1869. In cases where no official commissioning ceremony was held, the date of service entry may be used instead.

Date	Operator	Ship	Pennant	Class and type	Notes
30 April	United States Navy	USS Saugus	–	Canonicus-class monitor	Recommissioned
Unknown date	Spanish Navy	Doña María de Molina	–	Screw corvette	
