= List of ship commissionings in 1962 =

The list of ship commissionings in 1962 includes a chronological list of all ships commissioned in 1962.

	Operator	Ship	Class and type	Pennant	Other notes
7 April	German Navy	Augsburg	Köln-class frigate	F222	
18 July	Finnlines (Finland)	Hansa Express	ferry		First car/passenger ferry in Finland—Germany traffic
20 July	United States Navy	Okinawa	Iwo Jima-class amphibious assault ship	LPH-3	
4 August	United States Navy	Leahy	Leahy-class cruiser	DLG-16	
15 November	Royal Navy	Devonshire	County-class destroyer	D02	
15 December	German Navy	Karlsruhe	Köln-class frigate	F223	
