= List of ship decommissionings in 1973 =

The list of ship decommissionings in 1973 is a chronological list of ships decommissioned in 1973.

	Operator	Ship	Class and type	Fate	Other notes
13 March	Sweden, Stena Line	Stena Atlantica	ferry	Sold to Finnlines	Renamed Finnpartner
18 November	Royal Netherlands Navy	De Ruyter	De Zeven Provinciën-class cruiser	Transferred to Peruvian Navy	Renamed Almirante Grau (CLM-81)
12 November	Royal Australian Navy	Sydney		Sold for scrap in 1975	Paid off date
16 November	United States Navy	Ticonderoga	Essex-class aircraft carrier	Scrapped	

== Bibliography ==
- "Ticonderoga IV (CV-14)". Dictionary of American Naval Fighting Ships. Navy Department, Naval History and Heritage Command.
