= List of ship decommissionings in 1957 =

The list of ship decommissionings in 1957 includes a chronological list of all ships decommissioned in 1957. In cases where no official decommissioning ceremony was held, the date of withdrawal from service may be used instead. For ships lost at sea, see list of shipwrecks in 1957 instead.

	Operator	Ship	Class and type	Fate	Other notes
9 April	Spanish Navy	Velasco	Alsedo-class destroyer	Scrapped	
17 May	United States Navy	Badoeng Strait	Commencement Bay-class escort carrier	Reserve until stricken in 1970; scrapped	

== Bibliography ==
- Francis, Timothy L. (25 September 2005). "Badoeng Strait (CVE-116)". Dictionary of American Naval Fighting Ships. Navy Department, Naval History and Heritage Command.
