= List of ship commissionings in 1980 =

The list of ship commissionings in 1980 includes a chronological list of all ships commissioned in 1980.

	Operator	Ship	Flag	Class and type	Pennant	Other notes
January	People's Liberation Army Navy	Changzheng 2		Type 091 submarine	401	date of initial operational capability
16 February	United States Navy	Thorn		Spruance-class destroyer	DD-988	
22 March	United States Navy	Deyo		Spruance-class destroyer	DD-989	
24 April	Royal Netherlands Navy	Van Kinsbergen		Kortenaer-class frigate	F809	
31 May	United States Navy	Fife		Spruance-class destroyer	DD-991	
11 July	Royal Navy	Invincible		Invincible-class aircraft carrier	R05	
12 July	United States Navy	Fletcher		Spruance-class destroyer	DD-992	
11 October	United States Navy	Samuel Eliot Morison		Oliver Hazard Perry-class frigate	FFG-13	
18 October	United States Navy	Arkansas		Virginia-class cruiser	CGN-41	Sponsor: Mrs. Betty Bumpers
29 October	Royal Netherlands Navy	Banckert		Kortenaer-class frigate	F810	
15 November	Royal Australian Navy	Adelaide		Adelaide-class frigate	FFG 01	First in class
