= List of ship decommissionings in 1864 =

The list of ship decommissionings in 1864 includes a chronological list of ships decommissioned in 1864. In cases where no official decommissioning ceremony was held, the date of withdrawal from service may be used instead. For ships lost at sea, see list of shipwrecks in 1864 instead.

| Date | Operator | Ship | Pennant | Class and type | Fate and other notes |
|---|---|---|---|---|---|
| May | United States Revenue-Marine | Aaron V. Brown | | revenue cutter | sold |
| unknown date | Royal Danish Navy | Aarøsund | | gunboat | |
| unknown date | Hellenic Navy | Othon | | steamship | |
