= List of ship decommissionings in 1904 =

The list of ship decommissionings in 1904 includes a chronological list of ships decommissioned in 1904. In cases where no official decommissioning ceremony was held, the date of withdrawal from service may be used instead. For ships lost at sea, see list of shipwrecks in 1904 instead.

Date	Operator	Ship	Pennant	Class and type	Fate and other notes
August 20	United States Navy	Moccasin	Submarine Torpedo Boat No. 5	Plunger-class submarine	to reserve at Norfolk, Virginia until shipped to the Philippines
