= List of ship commissionings in 1881 =

The list of ship commissionings in 1881 is a chronological list of ships commissioned in 1881. In cases where no official commissioning ceremony was held, the date of service entry may be used instead.

Date	Operator	Ship	Pennant	Class and type	Notes
Unknown date	Spanish Navy	Gravina	–	Velasco-class unprotected cruiser	
