= List of ship decommissionings in 1926 =

The list of ship decommissionings in 1926 includes a chronological list of ships decommissioned in 1926. In cases where no official decommissioning ceremony was held, the date of withdrawal from service may be used instead. For ships lost at sea, see list of shipwrecks in 1926 instead.

Date	Operator	Ship	Class and type	Fate and other notes
January 21	United States Navy	Abarenda	collier	stricken and sold to S. R. Paterno at Cavite in 1926
Unknown date	Spanish Navy	Infanta Isabel	Velasco-class unprotected cruiser	scrapped 1927
