= List of ship decommissionings in 1879 =

The list of ship decommissionings in 1879 is a chronological list of ships decommissioned in 1879. In cases where no official decommissioning ceremony was held, the date of withdrawal from service may be used instead. For ships lost at sea, see list of shipwrecks in 1879 instead.

	Operator	Ship	Flag	Class and type	Fate	Other notes
27 December 1879	French Navy	Gloire		Ironclad battleship	Scrapped in 1883	

== Bibliography ==
- Roberts, Stephen S. (2021). French Warships in the Age of Steam 1859–1914: Design, Construction, Careers and Fates. Barnsley, UK: Seaforth Publishing. ISBN 978-1-5267-4533-0.
