= List of ship commissionings in 1880 =

The list of ship commissionings in 1880 is a chronological list of ships commissioned in 1880. In cases where no official commissioning ceremony was held, the date of service entry may be used instead.

| Date | Operator | Ship | Pennant | Class and type | Notes |
|---|---|---|---|---|---|
| Unknown date | Spanish Navy | Aragón | – | Aragon-class unprotected cruiser | |
