= List of ship decommissionings in 1923 =

The list of ship decommissionings in 1923 includes a chronological list of ships decommissioned in 1923. In cases where no official decommissioning ceremony was held, the date of withdrawal from service may be used instead. For ships lost at sea, see list of shipwrecks in 1923 instead.

Date	Operator	Ship	Class and type	Fate and other notes
July 16	United States Navy	T-2 (SS-60)	submarine	sold for scrap
unknown date	Royal Danish Navy	Absalon	patrol vessel	
