= List of ship decommissionings in 1966 =

The list of ship decommissionings in 1966 includes a chronological list of all ships decommissioned in 1966.

| Date | Operator | Ship | Class and type | Fate | Other notes |
|---|---|---|---|---|---|
| 25 February | Finnlines (Finland) | Hansa Express | Ferry | | Renamed Finndana |
| 2 May | United States Navy | Lake Champlain | Essex-class aircraft carrier | Scrapped | Reserve until stricken in 1969 |
| 1 October | Finnlines (Finland) | Finndana | Ferry | Chartered to TT-Line | |
| Date uncertain | French Navy | Dixmude | Charger-class escort carrier | Disposed | Returned to the United States Navy |

== Bibliography ==
"Lake Champlain II (CV-139)". Dictionary of American Naval Fighting Ships. Navy Department, Naval History and Heritage Command.
