= List of ship decommissionings in 2011 =

The list of ship decommissionings in 2011 includes a chronological list of ships decommissioned in 2011.

	Operator	Ship	Flag	Class and type	Pennant	Fate	Other notes
8 February	Royal Navy	Chatham		Type 22 frigate	F87	Scrapped	
24 February	Royal Navy	Manchester		Type 42 destroyer	D95	Scrapped	
11 March	Royal Navy	Ark Royal		Invincible-class aircraft carrier	R07	Scrapped	
28 March	United States Coast Guard	Hamilton		Hamilton-class cutter	WHEC-715	Transferred to Philippine Navy	Renamed BRP Gregorio del Pilar
11 March	Royal Navy	Largs Bay		Bay-class landing ship	L3006	Sold to Australia	Renamed HMAS Choules
7 April	Royal Navy	Campbeltown		Type 22 frigate	F86	Scrapped	
23 June	Royal Navy	Cumberland		Type 22 frigate	F85	Scrapped	
30 June	Royal Navy	Gloucester		Type 42 destroyer	D96	Scrapped	
30 June	Royal Navy	Cornwall		Type 22 frigate	F99	Scrapped	
30 September	United States Navy	Cleveland		Austin-class amphibious transport dock	LPD-7	inactive reserve	
