= List of shipwrecks in 1884 =

The list of shipwrecks in 1884 includes ships sunk, foundered, grounded, or otherwise lost during 1884.

table of contents
1884
Jan	Feb	Mar	Apr
May	Jun	Jul	Aug
Sep	Oct	Nov	Dec
Unknown date

== Unknown date ==
List of shipwrecks: Unknown date in 1884
Ship	State	Description
Albert M.	Germany	The brig was wrecked in the Atlantic Ocean between 23 April and 2 May. She was on a voyage from Fernandina to Buenos Aires, Argentina.
Campanero	United Kingdom	The ship was wrecked after 9 March.
C. C. Dame	Flag unknown	The schooner was lost at Bay Head, New Jersey.
Elliott Richie	United States	The waterlogged bark-rigged sternwheel paddle steamer was abandoned off Pernambuco, Brazil.
Elmina	United Kingdom	The Elmina was a Barquentine class and was part of the British civil ships. The ship was lost off of Long Island, New Jersey.
National Eagle	United States	The clipper was driven ashore and wrecked near Pola, Austria-Hungary.
Olano	United Kingdom	The barque was lost off Cape Horn, Chile.
