= List of ship commissionings in 1948 =

The list of ship commissionings in 1948 includes a chronological list of all ships commissioned in 1948.

Date	Operator	Ship	Class and type	Pennant	Other notes
28 May	Royal Netherlands Navy	Karel Doorman	Colossus-class aircraft carrier	R81	Former HMS Venerable
27 October	United States Navy	Cabot	Independence-class aircraft carrier	CVL-28	Recommissioned from reserve
November	U.S. Fish and Wildlife Service	Dennis Winn	Cargo liner		Former U.S. Army Lt. Walter J. Will (FS-244)
November	Royal Navy	Warrior	Colossus-class aircraft carrier	R31	Former HMCS Warrior
16 December	Royal Australian Navy	Sydney	Majestic-class aircraft carrier	R17	Former HMS Terrible

== Bibliography ==
- Jordan, John (1995). "Netherlands". In Chumbley, Stephen (ed.). Conway's All The World's Fighting Ships 1947–1995. Annapolis, Maryland: Naval Institute Press. pp. 269–283. ISBN 1-55750-132-7.
