= List of ship commissionings in 2012 =

The list of ship commissionings in 2012 includes a chronological list of all ships commissioned in 2012.

| | Operator | Ship | Flag | Class and type | Pennant | Other notes |
|---|---|---|---|---|---|---|
| 20 April | Royal Navy | Dragon | | Type 45 destroyer | D35 | |
| 19 May | United States Navy | San Diego | | San Antonio-class amphibious transport dock | LPD-22 | |
| 2 June | United States Navy | Mississippi | | Virginia-class submarine | SSN-782 | |
| 22 September | United States Navy | Fort Worth | | Freedom-class littoral combat ship | LCS-3 | |
| 6 October | United States Navy | Michael Murphy | | Arleigh Burke-class destroyer | DDG-112 | |
| 28 November | Russian Navy | Dagestan | | Gepard-class frigate | | |
| 4 December | Russian Navy | Mahachkala | | Buyan-class corvette | | |
