= List of ship decommissionings in 1970 =

The list of ship decommissionings in 1970 is a chronological list of ships decommissioned in 1970.

Date	Operator	Ship	Flag	Class and type	Fate	Other notes
9 January	Spanish Navy	Galicia		Almirante Cervera-class light cruiser	Scrapped 1970	Per ABC. Also reported decommissioned on 1 July 1964.
15 January	United States Navy	Valley Forge		Essex-class amphibious assault ship	Scrapped	
30 January	United States Navy	Princeton		Essex-class aircraft carrier	Scrapped	
6 July	Siljarederiet	Fennia	Finland	Ferry	Sold to Svea Line (Finland)	Continued in Silja Line traffic
6 August	United States Navy	Bennington		Essex-class aircraft carrier	Scrapped	Reserve until stricken in 1989
26 June	United States Navy	Hornet		Essex-class aircraft carrier	Museum ship	Naval Air Station Alameda
27 June	United States Navy	Yorktown		Essex-class aircraft carrier	Museum ship	Patriots Point, South Carolina
3 July	Royal Canadian Navy	Bonaventure		Majestic-class aircraft carrier	Scrapped in 1971	

== Bibliography ==
- "Valley Forge (CV-45)". Dictionary of American Naval Fighting Ships. Navy Department, Naval History and Heritage Command.
