= List of ship decommissionings in 1999 =

The list of ship decommissionings in 1999 includes a chronological list of all ships decommissioned in 1999.

	Operator	Ship	Flag	Class and type	Fate	Other notes
14 January	Royal Navy	London		Type 22 frigate	Sold to Romania	Renamed Regina Maria
17 March	United States Navy	Batfish		Sturgeon-class submarine	Submarine recycling program	
23 March	Royal Navy	Brave		Type 22 frigate	Sunk as target	
1 May	Royal Navy	Beaver		Type 22 frigate	Sold for scrap in 2001	
1 June	United States Navy	Trepang		Sturgeon-class submarine	Submarine recycling program	
1 July	United States Navy	Billfish		Sturgeon-class submarine	Submarine recycling program	
1 July	United States Navy	Narwhal		Sturgeon-class submarine	Submarine recycling program	
9 July	United States Navy	California		California-class cruiser	Nuclear ship recycling program	
4 August	Royal Navy	Boxer		Type 22 frigate	Sunk as target	
15 October	Royal Australian Navy	Perth		Perth-class destroyer	Sunk as dive wreck in 2001	
31 December	Royal Navy	Birmingham		Type 42 destroyer	Sold for scrap in 2000	
