= List of ship commissionings in 1994 =

The list of ship commissionings in 1994 includes a chronological list of all ships commissioned in 1994.

	Operator	Ship	Flag	Class and type	Pennant	Other notes
26 February	Royal Netherlands Navy	Van Nes		Karel Doorman-class frigate	F833	
19 March	United States Navy	Curtis Wilbur		Arleigh Burke-class destroyer	DDG-54	
8 May	People's Liberation Army Navy	Harbin		Type 052 destroyer	112	Date of initial operational capability
13 May	Royal Navy	Westminster		Type 23 frigate	F237	
2 June	Royal Navy	Montrose		Type 23 frigate	F236	
2 July	United States Navy	John S. McCain		Arleigh Burke-class destroyer	DDG-56	
13 August	United States Navy	Stout		Arleigh Burke-class destroyer	DDG-55	
9 July	United States Navy	Port Royal		Ticonderoga-class cruiser	CG-73	
29 November	Royal Navy	Northumberland		Type 23 frigate	F238	
1 December	Royal Netherlands Navy	Van Galen		Karel Doorman-class frigate	F834	
10 December	United States Navy	Mitscher		Arleigh Burke-class destroyer	DDG-57	
