= List of ship commissionings in 1894 =

The list of ship commissionings in 1894 is a chronological list of ships commissioned in 1894. In cases where no official commissioning ceremony was held, the date of service entry may be used instead.

Date	Operator	Ship	Flag	Class and type	Pennant	Other notes
14 February	Royal Navy	HMS Centurion		Centurion-class battleship		
25 April	Royal Navy	HMS Repulse		Royal Sovereign-class battleship		
29 April	Imperial German Navy	SMS Kurfürst Friedrich Wilhelm		Brandenburg-class battleship		
22 June	Royal Navy	HMS Barfleur		Centurion-class battleship		
14 October	Imperial German Navy	SMS Weissenburg		Brandenburg-class battleship		
