= List of ship commissionings in 1956 =

The list of ship commissionings in 1956 includes a chronological list of all ships commissioned in 1956.

	Operator	Ship	Class and type	Pennant	Other notes
14 April	United States Navy	Saratoga	Forrestal-class aircraft carrier	CVA-60	
20 July	United States Navy	Thetis Bay	Casablanca-class assault helicopter aircraft carrier	CVHA-1	Recommissioned from reserve
20 July	(Canada) Coast Ferries Ltd.	Mill Bay	RORO ferry		Purchased by BC Ferries in 1969
2 October	Royal Netherlands Navy	Lynx	Roofdier-class frigate	F823	
15 December	Royal Canadian Navy	Assiniboine	St. Laurent-class destroyer escort	DDE 234	Redesignated DDH 234 June 28, 1963 following helicopter modernization
15 December	Royal Canadian Navy	Ottawa	St. Laurent-class destroyer escort	DDE 229	Redesignated DDH 229 October 21, 1964 following helicopter modernization
15 December	Royal Canadian Navy	Saguenay	St. Laurent-class destroyer escort	DDE 206	Redesignated DDH 206 May 14, 1965 following helicopter modernization
