= List of ship decommissionings in 1971 =

This is a list of ships decommissioned in 1971.

Date	Operator	Ship	Class and type	Fate	Other notes
30 June	United States Navy	Shangri-La	Essex-class aircraft carrier	Scrapped	Reserve until stricken in 1982
2 July	United States Navy	Bon Homme Richard	Essex-class aircraft carrier	Scrapped	Reserve until stricken in 1989

== Bibliography ==
- "Bon Homme Richard (CV-31)". Dictionary of American Naval Fighting Ships. Navy Department, Naval History and Heritage Command.
