= List of ship decommissionings in 1934 =

The list of ship decommissionings in 1934 is a chronological list of ships decommissioned in 1934. In cases where no official decommissioning ceremony was held, the date of withdrawal from service may be used instead. For ships lost at sea, see list of shipwrecks in 1934 instead.

Date	Operator	Ship	Class and type	Fate and other notes	Ref
1 January	Spanish Navy	Narcíso Monturiol	A-class submarine	Scrapped	
21 May	United States Coast Guard	USCGC Abel P. Upshur	Clemson-class destroyer	Returned to the United States Navy; in reserve at Philadelphia Navy Yard until recommissioned in 1939	
December (unknown date)	Portuguese Navy	NRP Golfinho	Foca-class submarine	Stricken date. Later scrapped.	
Unknown date	Spanish Navy	Giralda	Survey ship	Former royal yacht. Sold 1940 and scrapped.	
