= List of ship commissionings in 1924 =

The list of ship commissionings in 1924 is a chronological list of ships commissioned in 1924. In cases where no official commissioning ceremony was held, the date of service entry may be used instead.

	Operator	Ship	Class and type	Pennant	Other notes
11 December	Royal Netherlands Navy	HNLMS Krakatau	Krakatau-class minelayer		
