= List of ship decommissionings in 1870 =

The list of ship decommissionings in 1870 includes a chronological list of all ships decommissioned in 1870.

| Date | Operator | Ship | Pennant | Class and type | Fate and other notes |
|---|---|---|---|---|---|
| 7 January | United States Navy | Contoocook | | Contoocook-class sloop | Reused as a quarantine ship until 1872. |
| 29 July | United States Navy | Quinnebaug | | | Decommissioned and laid up in New York before she was broken up in 1871. |
| 11 October | United States Navy | Kearsarge | | Mohican-class sloop | Decommissioned at the Mare Island Navy Yard before she was recommissioned in 1873. |
| 5 December | United States Navy | Piscataqua | | Java-class frigate | Decommissioned and laid up in New York, where she sank in 1876 |
| December 31 | United States Navy | Saugus | | Canonicus-class monitor | Laid up at Key West and towed to Philadelphia Navy Yard until recommissioned in 1872. |
