= List of ship decommissionings in 1905 =

The list of ship decommissionings in 1905 includes a chronological list of ships decommissioned in 1905. In cases where no official decommissioning ceremony was held, the date of withdrawal from service may be used instead. For ships lost at sea, see list of shipwrecks in 1905 instead.

| Date | Operator | Ship | Class and type | Fate and other notes |
|---|---|---|---|---|
| February 21 | United States Navy | Abarenda | collier | at Norfolk Naval Yard, transferred to merchant service under J. W. Holmes |
