= List of ship decommissionings in 2009 =

The list of ship decommissionings in 2009 includes a chronological list of ships decommissioned in 2009. In cases where no official decommissioning ceremony was held, the date of withdrawal from service may be used instead.

Date	Operator	Ship	Class and type	Fate and other notes
February 12	Royal Navy	Southampton (D90)	Type 42 destroyer	scrapped
March 25	Royal Danish Navy	Agpa (Y387)	Agdlek-class cutter	sold at auction for 1,400,000 DKK
May 12	United States Navy	Kitty Hawk (CV-63)	Kitty Hawk-class aircraft carrier	Inactive
May 27	Royal Navy	Exeter (D89)	Type 42 destroyer	scrapped, Exeter was the last RN warship in commission to have taken part in the Falklands War of 1982.
