= List of ship decommissionings in 1932 =

The list of ship decommissionings in 1932 is a chronological list of ships decommissioned in 1932. In cases where no official decommissioning ceremony was held, the date of withdrawal from service may be used instead. For ships lost at sea, see list of shipwrecks in 1932 instead.

Date	Operator	Ship	Class and type	Fate and other notes
18 May	Spanish Navy	A-3	A-class submarine	Scrapped
Unknown date	(Philippines) Insular Government of the Philippine Islands	Apo	Yacht	Returned to the United States Government
Unknown date	Spanish Navy	Villaamil	Bustamante-class destroyer	Decommissioned late 1932; scrapped
