= List of ship decommissionings in 1975 =

The list of ship decommissionings in 1975 is a chronological list of ships decommissioned in 1975.

	Operator	Ship	Class and type	Fate	Other notes
26 August	German Navy	Falke	Seeadler-class fast attack craft	Sold to Greece	Renamed Kataigis
28 November	German Navy	Bussard	Seeadler-class fast attack craft	Sold to Greece	Cannibalized
1 December	Finland, Finnlines	Finnpartner	Ferry	Laid up in Helsinki; chartered to Olau Line in March 1976	Renamed Olau Finn
19 December	German Navy	Albatros	Seeadler-class fast attack craft	Sold to Greece	Cannibalized
Unknown date	U.S. National Oceanic and Atmospheric Administration	Pribilof	Cargo liner	Sold 1975	Extant 2013
