= List of ship decommissionings in 1952 =

The list of ship decommissionings in 1952 includes a chronological list of all ships decommissioned in 1952. In cases where no official decommissioning ceremony was held, the date of withdrawal from service may be used instead. For ships lost at sea, see list of shipwrecks in 1952 instead.

	Operator	Ship	Class and type	Fate	Other notes
November 13	Royal Navy	HMS Vengeance	Colossus-class aircraft carrier	Leased to Australia in 1952, sold to Brazil in 1956, decommissioned in 2001, scrapped in India in 2004	
Date uncertain	United States Navy	SS Meredith Victory	Victory ship (cargo ship)	Decommissioned in 1952, scrapped in China in 1993	
Date uncertain	Hellenic Navy	Kriezis	Flower-class corvette	Decommissioned in 1952, scrapped in 1953	
