= List of ship decommissionings in 1954 =

The list of ship decommissionings in 1954 includes a chronological list of all ships decommissioned in 1954. In cases where no official decommissioning ceremony was held, the date of withdrawal from service may be used instead. For ships lost at sea, see list of shipwrecks in 1954 instead.

	Operator	Ship	Class and type	Fate	Other notes
16 February	United States Navy	Salerno Bay	Commencement Bay-class escort carrier	Scrapped	Reserve until stricken in 1961
9 April	United States Navy	USS Bataan	Independence-class light aircraft carrier	Scrapped	Reserve until stricken in 1959
15 June	United States Navy	USS Palau	Commencement Bay-class escort carrier	Scrapped	Reserve until stricken in 1960
5 July	United States Navy	USS Sicily	Commencement Bay-class escort carrier	Scrapped	Reserve until stricken in 1960
27 July	(United States) Military Sea Transportation Service	USS Sitkoh Bay	Casablanca-class aircraft transport	Scrapped	United States Navy reserve until stricken in 1960
27 August	United States Navy	USS Block Island	Commencement Bay-class escort carrier	Scrapped	Reserve until stricken in 1959

== Bibliography ==
- "Palau (CVE-122)". Dictionary of American Naval Fighting Ships. Navy Department, Naval History and Heritage Command.
- Silverstone, Paul H. (2008). The Navy of World War II, 1922-1947. The U.S. Navy Warship Series. New York: Routledge. ISBN 978-0-415-97898-9.
