= List of ship commissionings in 1991 =

The list of ship commissionings in 1991 includes a chronological list of all ships commissioned in 1991.

	Operator	Ship	Flag	Class and type	Pennant	Other notes
26 January	United States Navy	Scranton		Los Angeles-class submarine	SSN-756	
9 March	United States Navy	Cowpens		Ticonderoga-class cruiser	CG-63	
29 March	Royal Netherlands Navy	Karel Doorman		Karel Doorman-class frigate	F827	
1 June	United States Navy	Rushmore		Whidbey Island-class dock landing ship	LSD-47	
22 June	United States Navy	Gettysburg		Ticonderoga-class cruiser	CG-64	
4 July	United States Navy	Arleigh Burke		Arleigh Burke-class destroyer	DDG-51	
14 September	United States Navy	Hué City		Ticonderoga-class cruiser	CG-66	
28 November	Royal Netherlands Navy	Willem van der Zaan		Karel Doorman-class frigate	F829	

== Bibliography ==
- Jordan, John (1995). "Netherlands". In Chumbley, Stephen (ed.). Conway's All The World's Fighting Ships 1947–1995. Annapolis, Maryland: Naval Institute Press. pp. 269–283. ISBN 1-55750-132-7.
