= List of ship commissionings in 1988 =

The list of ship commissionings in 1988 includes a chronological list of all ships commissioned in 1988.

	Operator	Ship	Flag	Class and type	Pennant	Other notes
23 January	United States Navy	San Jacinto		Ticonderoga-class cruiser	CG-56	
30 May	Spanish Navy	Príncipe de Asturias		STOL aircraft carrier	R11	
12 August	United States Navy	Lake Champlain		Ticonderoga-class cruiser	CG-57	
November	People's Liberation Army Navy	Changzheng 4		Type 091 submarine	404	date of initial operational capability
