= List of ship decommissionings in 1906 =

The list of ship decommissionings in 1906 includes a chronological list of ships decommissioned in 1906. In cases where no official decommissioning ceremony was held, the date of withdrawal from service may be used instead. For ships lost at sea, see list of shipwrecks in 1906 instead.

Date	Operator	Ship	Pennant	Class and type	Fate and other notes
November 28	United States Navy	Grampus	Submarine Torpedo Boat No. 4	Plunger-class submarine	At Mare Island Navy Yard until recommissioned in 1908
November 28	United States Navy	Pike	Submarine Torpedo Boat No. 6	Plunger-class submarine	Until recommissioned in 1908
