= List of ship commissionings in 1961 =

The list of ship commissionings in 1961 includes a chronological list of all ships commissioned in 1961.

	Operator	Ship	Class and type	Pennant	Other notes
28 March	Royal New Zealand Navy	Taranaki	Modified Rothesay-class frigate	F148	
15 April	German Navy	Köln	Köln-class frigate	F220	
21 May	United States Navy	Kitty Hawk	Kitty Hawk-class aircraft carrier	CVA-63	First in class
24 June	United States Navy	Sampson	Charles F. Adams-class destroyer	DDG-10	
29 August	United States Navy	Iwo Jima	Iwo Jima-class amphibious assault ship	LPH-2	First in class
24 October	German Navy	Emden	Köln-class frigate	F221	
27 October	United States Navy	Constellation	Kitty Hawk-class aircraft carrier	CVA-64	
4 November	United States Navy	William V. Pratt	Farragut-class destroyer	DDG-44	
22 November	French Navy	Clemenceau	Clemenceau-class aircraft carrier	R98	First in class
25 November	United States Navy	Enterprise	Unique nuclear-powered aircraft carrier	CVAN-65	

== Bibliography ==
- Friedman, Norman (1995). "United States". In Chumbley, Stephen (ed.). Conway's All The World's Fighting Ships 1947–1995. Annapolis, Maryland: Naval Institute Press. pp. 544–634. ISBN 1-55750-132-7.
