= List of ship commissionings in 1865 =

The list of ship commissionings in 1865 is a chronological list of ships commissioned in 1865. In cases where no official commissioning ceremony was held, the date of service entry may be used instead.

Date	Operator	Ship	Pennant	Class and type	Notes
May	Spanish Navy	Gerona	–	Screw frigate	
June	Spanish Navy	Almansa	–	Screw frigate	
22 August	United States Navy	USS Camanche	–	Passaic-class monitor	
