= List of ship commissionings in 1836 =

The list of ship commissionings in 1836 includes a chronological list of ships commissioned in 1836. In cases where no official commissioning ceremony was held, the date of service entry may be used instead.

Date	Operator	Ship	Pennant	Class and type	Notes
unknown date	Royal Danish Navy	Aarøsund		gunboat	
