= List of ship commissionings in 1889 =

The list of ship commissionings in 1889 is a chronological list of ships commissioned in 1889. In cases where no official commissioning ceremony was held, the date of service entry may be used instead.

	Operator	Ship	Flag	Class and type	Pennant	Other notes
17 April	United States Navy	USS Chicago		Protected cruiser	–	
28 May	Royal Navy	HMS Anson		Admiral-class battleship	–	
18 July	Royal Navy	HMS Camperdown		Admiral-class battleship	–	
July	Royal Navy	HMS Howe		Admiral-class battleship	–	

== Bibliography ==
- Roberts, John (1979). "Great Britain (including Empire Forces)". In Chesneau, Roger & Kolesnik, Eugene M. (eds.). Conway's All the World's Fighting Ships 1860–1905. New York: Mayflower Books. pp. 1–113. ISBN 0-8317-0302-4.
