= List of ship decommissionings in 1917 =

The list of ship decommissionings in 1917 includes a chronological list of ships decommissioned in 1917. In cases where no official decommissioning ceremony was held, the date of withdrawal from service may be used instead. For ships lost at sea, see list of shipwrecks in 1917 instead.

Date	Operator	Ship	Pennant	Class and type	Fate and other notes
April	Royal Navy	HMS Swiftsure		Swiftsure-class battleship	Originally Chilean. Converted to a barracks ship
May 10.	Royal Danish Navy	HDMS Valkyrien		Protected cruiser	Used as a quarantine hospital during Spanish flu pandemic
