= List of ship decommissionings in 2018 =

The list of ship decommissionings in 2018 includes a chronological list of ships decommissioned in 2018.

	Operator	Ship	Flag	Class and type	Pennant	Fate	Other notes
15 February	Royal Navy	Gleaner		Survey Motor Launch	H86	Awaiting disposal	
27 March	Royal Navy	Ocean		Landing Platform Helicopter	L12	Sold to Brazil	
