= List of ship decommissionings in 1986 =

The list of ship decommissionings in 1986 includes a chronological list of all ships decommissioned in 1986.

	Operator	Ship	Flag	Class and type	Fate	Other notes
2 January	Effoa	Silja Star	Finland	ferry	Sold to Sea Containers	Renamed Orient Express
March	Birka Line	Prinsessan	Sweden	ferry	Laid up, sold to Louis Cruise Lines in March 1987	Renamed Princesa Marissa
26 April	Rederi Ab Sally (Viking Line traffic)	Viking Saga	Finland	cruiseferry	Transferred to Sally Cruise	Renamed Sally Albatross
18 July	Townsend Thoresen	Tiger	United Kingdom	ferry	Sold to SF Line	Renamed Ålandfärjan for Viking Line traffic
11 October	Royal Navy	Glamorgan		County-class destroyer	Sold to Chile	Renamed Almirante Latorre (D14)
December	Sea Containers	Orient Express	Bermuda	Cruise ship	Chartered to Club Sea	Renamed Club Sea
