= List of ship decommissionings in 1878 =

The list of ship decommissionings in 1878 is a chronological list of ships decommissioned in 1878.

Date	Operator	Ship	Pennant	Class and type	Fate and other notes
14 November	Spanish Navy	Arapiles	–	Armored frigate	Hulked 1879; stricken 1881; scrapped 1883.
