= List of ship decommissionings in 1968 =

The list of ship decommissionings in 1968 includes a chronological list of all ships decommissioned in 1968.

| | Operator | Ship | Class and type | Fate | Other notes |
|---|---|---|---|---|---|
| 15 October | Royal Netherlands Navy | Karel Doorman | Colossus-class aircraft carrier | Sold to Argentina | Renamed Veinticinco de Mayo (V-2) |
| Unknown date | (United States) United States; Coast and Geodetic Survey | Explorer | Survey ship | | |
