= List of ship commissionings in 1938 =

The list of ship commissionings in 1938 includes a chronological list of all ships commissioned in 1938.

Date	Operator	Ship	Class and type	Pennant	Other notes
9 February	Luftwaffe	Hans Rolshoven	Krischan-class seaplane tender		Completion date
21 May	Kriegsmarine	Gneisenau	Scharnhorst-class battleship		
25 June	Kriegsmarine	U-45	Type VIIB submarine	U-45	
4 August	Kriegsmarine	U-37	Type IX ocean-going submarine	U-37	
6 August	Kriegsmarine	U-51	Type VIIB submarine	U-51	
15 September	French Navy	Strasbourg	Dunkerque-class battleship		
24 October	Kriegsmarine	U-38	Type IX ocean-going submarine	U-38	
2 November	Kriegsmarine	U-46	Type VIIB submarine	U-46	
26 November	Kriegsmarine	U-56	Type VIIB submarine	U-56	
26 November	Luftwaffe	Sperber	Light seaplane tender		Completion date
17 December	Kriegsmarine	U-47	Type VIIB submarine	U-47	
24 December	Kriegsmarine	U-39	Type IX ocean-going submarine	U-39	
29 December	Kriegsmarine	U-57	Type VIIB submarine	U-57	
