= List of ship commissionings in 1899 =

The list of ship commissionings in 1899 is a chronological record of ships commissioned in 1899. In cases where no official commissioning ceremony was held, the date of service entry may be used instead.

Date	Operator	Ship	Flag	Class and type	Pennant	Other notes
15 January	French Navy	Gaulois		Charlemagne-class battleship	–	
29 January	Spanish Navy	Lepanto		Reina Regente-class protected cruiser	–	
20 February	Imperial German Navy	Victoria Louise		Victoria Louise-class cruiser	–	
22 March	United States Navy	Farragut		Torpedo boat	TB-11	
1 April	United States Navy	Rowan		Torpedo boat	TB-8	
20 April	United States Navy	Manley		Torpedo boat	TB-23	
1 May	United States Navy	MacKenzie		Torpedo boat	TB-17	
10 May	United States Navy	Davis		Torpedo boat	TB-12	
8 July	United States Navy	Fox		Torpedo boat	TB-13	
1 August	Spanish Navy	Río de la Plata		Protected cruiser	–	
12 September	French Navy	Charlemagne		Charlemagne-class battleship	–	
13 September	Imperial German Navy	Vineta		Victoria Louise-class cruiser	–	
5 December	Royal Navy	Canopus		Canopus-class battleship	–	
