= List of ship commissionings in 1947 =

The list of ship commissionings in 1947 includes a chronological list of all ships commissioned in 1947.

| | Operator | Ship | Class and type | Pennant | Other notes |
|---|---|---|---|---|---|
| 6 January | United States Navy | Badoeng Strait | Commencement Bay-class escort carrier | CVE-116 | Recommissioned from reserve |
| 9 February | United States Navy | Wright | Saipan-class aircraft carrier | CVL-49 | |
| 9 February | Southern Railway Co (United Kingdom) | Dinard | Ferry | | Returned to owners after wartime service as a hospital ship |
| 1 October | United States Navy | Coral Sea | Midway-class aircraft carrier | CVB-43 | |
