= List of ship decommissionings in 1965 =

The list of ship decommissionings in 1965 includes a chronological list of ships decommissioned in 1965. In cases where no official decommissioning ceremony was held, the date of withdrawal from service may be used instead. For ships lost at sea, see list of shipwrecks in 1965 instead.

Date	Operator	Ship	Class and type	Fate and other notes	Ref
26 March	United States Navy	Abbot	Fletcher-class destroyer	Reserve with Philadelphia Group, Atlantic Reserve Fleet until stricken in 1974 and sold for scrap in 1975	
unknown date	(Finland) Rederi Ab Vikinglinjen	Drotten	Passenger ship	Laid up in Mariehamn and used as a café ship until scrapped in 1979	
