= List of ship decommissionings in 1939 =

The list of ship decommissionings in 1939 is a chronological list of all ships decommissioned in 1939. In cases where no official decommissioning ceremony was held, the date of withdrawal from service may be used instead. For ships lost at sea, see list of shipwrecks in 1939 instead.

	Operator	Ship	Class and type	Fate	Other notes
2 October	(United Kingdom) Southern Railway Co	Dinard	ferry	Converted into a hospital ship	Renamed HM Hospital Ship No 28
20 October	Spanish Navy	Kanguro	Submarine rescue ship	Recommissioned on 1 February 1940	
