= List of ship decommissionings in 1908 =

The list of ship decommissionings in 1908 includes a chronological list of ships decommissioned in 1908. In cases where no official decommissioning ceremony was held, the date of withdrawal from service may be used instead. For ships lost at sea, see list of shipwrecks in 1908 instead.

Date	Operator	Ship	Class and type	Fate and other notes
January 1	Spanish Navy	Destructor	Torpedo gunboat or destroyer	Sold December 1911; scrapped
April 21	United States Navy	Porpoise (Submarine Torpedo Boat No. 7)	Plunger-class submarine	At New York Navy Yard for disassembly and shipment to the Philippines
June 25	Royal Danish Navy	Absalon	Training schooner	
September 19	United States Navy	Shark (Submarine Torpedo Boat No. 8)	Plunger-class submarine	At New York Navy Yard for disassembly and shipment to the Philippines
October 3	Spanish Navy	Lepanto	Reina Regente-class protected cruiser	Sold 1911; scrapped
Unknown date	Spanish Navy	Asturias	Floating jetty	Ex-screw frigate Princesa de Asturias; hulked as training ship since 1871; sold 1909; auctioned off for firewood 1914
Unknown date	Spanish Navy	Vitoria	Coastal defense ship	Hulked since 1903; stricken and scrapped 1912
