= List of ship decommissionings in 1994 =

The list of ship decommissionings in 1994 includes a chronological list of all ships decommissioned in 1994.

	Operator	Ship	Flag	Class and type	Fate	Other notes
18 April	United States Navy	Greenling		Permit-class submarine	Scrapped	
20 August	United States Navy	Saratoga		Forrestal-class aircraft carrier	Scrapped	
31 August	United States Navy	Guadalcanal		Iwo Jima-class amphibious assault ship	Sunk as target 2005	
1 September	United States Navy	Woodrow Wilson		Lafayette-class submarine		

== Bibliography ==
- Friedman, Norman (1995). "United States". In Chumbley, Stephen (ed.). Conway's All The World's Fighting Ships 1947–1995. Annapolis, Maryland: Naval Institute Press. pp. 544–634. ISBN 1-55750-132-7.
