= List of ship decommissionings in 1984 =

The list of ship decommissionings in 1984 includes a chronological list of all ships decommissioned in 1984.

	Operator	Ship	Flag	Class and type	Fate	Other notes
5 February	Johnson Line (Silja Line traffic)	Svea Corona	Sweden	Ferry	Sold to Sundance Cruises	Renamed Sundancer
8 February	Svea Line (Finland)	Fennia	Finland	Ferry	Sold to Jakob Lines	
25 June	Royal Navy	Antrim		County-class destroyer	Sold to Chile	Renamed Almirante Cochrane
30 June	Sundance Cruises	Sundancer	Bahamas	Cruise ship	Partially sunk near Menzies Bay; refloated, sold to Epirotiki Lines in November	Renamed Pegasus
3 September	Folkline	Folkliner	Finland	Ferry	Laid up; sold to Minoan Lines on October	Renamed Festos
4 October	Aura Line	Borea	Finland	Ferry	Laid up; sold to Kristina Cruises in 1987	Renamed Kristina Regina

== Bibliography ==
- Colledge, J. J.; Warlow, Ben & Bush, Steve (2020). Ships of the Royal Navy: The Complete Record of all Fighting Ships of the Royal Navy from the 15th Century to the Present (5th revised and updated ed.). Barnsley, UK: Seaforth Publishing. ISBN 978-1-5267-9327-0.
