= List of ship decommissionings in 1995 =

The list of ship decommissionings in 1995 includes a chronological list of all ships decommissioned in 1995.

	Operator	Ship	Flag	Class and type	Fate	Other notes
30 May	Chilean Navy	Virgilio Uribe		Buckley-class destroyer escort	Scrapped	
8 September	United States Navy	Tripoli		Iwo Jima-class amphibious assault ship	Scrapped	Mare Island, California

== Bibliography ==
- "Tripoli II (LPH-10)". Dictionary of American Naval Fighting Ships. Navy Department, Naval History and Heritage Command.
