= List of ship decommissionings in 2014 =

The list of ship decommissionings in 2014 includes a chronological list of ships decommissioned in 2014.

	Operator	Ship	Flag	Class and type	Pennant	Fate	Other notes
23 May	United States Navy	Rentz		Oliver Hazard Perry-class frigate	FFG-46	Sunk as target	
18 June	Royal Navy	Tireless		Trafalgar Class submarine	S88	Awaiting disposal	
28 August	Royal Navy	Illustrious		Invincible Class aircraft carrier	R06	Scrapped	
