= List of ship decommissionings in 1948 =

The list of ship decommissionings in 1948 includes a chronological list of ships decommissioned in 1948. In cases where no official decommissioning ceremony was held, the date of withdrawal from service may be used instead. For ships lost at sea, see list of shipwrecks in 1948 instead.

Date	Operator	Ship	Class and type	Fate and other notes
24 January	Spanish Navy	Teruel	Teruel-class destroyer	Stricken 1948 and scrapped
25 February	United States Navy	Randolph	Essex-class aircraft carrier	Placed in reserve until recommissioned in 1953
23 March	Royal Canadian Navy	Warrior	Colossus-class aircraft carrier	Returned to the Royal Navy
21 April	United States Navy	Texas	New York-class battleship	Donated to Texas as a museum ship and preserved at the San Jacinto Battleground State Historic Site
28 May	Royal Netherlands Navy	Karel Doorman	Nairana-class escort carrier	Returned to the Royal Navy, converted to merchant ship Port Victor
Unknown date	Spanish Navy	Isaac Peral	C-class submarine	Sunk as target 1951
