= List of ship decommissionings in 1953 =

The list of ship decommissionings in 1953 includes a chronological list of all ships decommissioned in 1953. In cases where no official decommissioning ceremony was held, the date of withdrawal from service may be used instead. For ships lost at sea, see list of shipwrecks in 1953 instead.

	Operator	Ship	Class and type	Fate	Other notes
18 March	United States Navy	USS Croaker	Gato-class submarine	Reserve	Recommissioned 11 December 1953
27 August	Spanish Navy	Huesca	Teruel-class destroyer	Scrapped	
27 November	United States Navy	USS Scabbardfish	Balao-class submarine	Reserve	Recommissioned 24 October 1964

== Bibliography ==
- Friedman, Norman (1995). US submarines through 1945: an illustrated design history (1. pr ed.). Annapolis, Md: Naval Institute Press.
