= List of ship decommissionings in 1958 =

The list of ship decommissionings in 1958 includes a chronological list of all ships decommissioned in 1958. In cases where no official decommissioning ceremony was held, the date of withdrawal from service may be used instead. For ships lost at sea, see list of shipwrecks in 1958 instead.

	Operator	Ship	Class and type	Fate	Other notes
3 May	(Finland) Finnish Board of Navigation	Murtaja	Icebreaker	Scrapped	
22 June	Royal Fleet Auxiliary	RFA Belgol	Tanker	Scrapped	
17 July	Royal Fleet Auxiliary	RFA Celerol	Tanker	Scrapped	
4 September	(United States) Military Sea Transportation Service	Corregidor	Casablanca-class aircraft transport	Scrapped	
1 October	United States Navy	USS Kearsarge	Essex-class aircraft carrier	Reserve until stricken in 1973; scrapped	
22 November	(United States) Military Sea Transportation Service	Didrickson Bay	Casablanca-class escort carrier	Scrapped	
28 December	United States Navy	USS Philippine Sea	Essex-class aircraft carrier	Reserve until stricken in 1969; scrapped	
Date uncertain	Chilean Navy	Almirante Latorre	Battleship	Scrapped	
Date uncertain	(United Kingdom) Southern Railway Co	Dinard	Ferry	Laid up	Sold to Rederi Ab Vikinglinjen, Finland in April 1959

== Bibliography ==
- Evans, Mark L. (17 July 2020). "Kearsarge III (CV-33)". Dictionary of American Naval Fighting Ships. Navy Department, Naval History and Heritage Command.
