= List of ship commissionings in 1861 =

The list of ship commissionings in 1861 is a chronological list of ships commissioned in 1861. In cases where no official commissioning ceremony was held, the date of service entry may be used instead.

Date	Operator	Ship	Pennant	Class and type	Notes
6 September	Spanish Navy	Lealtad	–	Lealtad-class screw frigate	
Unknown date	United States Navy	A. Houghton	–	Bark	commissioned at New York Navy Yard with Acting Master Newell Graham in command
