= List of ship commissionings in 1929 =

The list of ship commissionings in 1929 is a chronological list of ships commissioned in 1929. In cases where no official commissioning ceremony was held, the date of service entry may be used instead.

	Operator	Ship	Class and type	Pennant	Other notes
4 May	Spanish Navy	C-3	C-class submarine	C-3	
19 August	Ofotens Dampskibsselskab	Barøy	Passenger / cargo ship		
21 September	Spanish Navy	C-4	C-class submarine	C-4	
22 October	Royal Netherlands Navy	HNLMS Van Galen	Admiralen-class destroyer	VG	
