= List of ship commissionings in 1810 =

The list of ship commissionings in 1810 includes a chronological list of ships commissioned in 1810. In cases where no official commissioning ceremony was held, the date of service entry may be used instead.

Date	Operator	Ship	Class and type	Notes
September 10	Royal Dano-Norwegian Navy	Alban	Adonis-class schooner	Captured from the Royal Navy
