= List of ship commissionings in 1872 =

The list of ship commissionings in 1872 is a chronological list of ships commissioned in 1872. In cases where no official commissioning ceremony was held, the date of service entry may be used instead.

Date	Operator	Ship	Pennant	Class and type	Notes
January 22	United States Navy	USS Canonicus		Canonicus-class monitor	recommissioned
November 9	United States Navy	USS Saugus		Canonicus-class monitor	recommissioned at the Philadelphia Navy Yard
