= List of ship commissionings in 1860 =

The list of ship commissionings in 1860 includes a chronological list of all ships commissioned in 1860.

	Operator	Ship	Flag	Class and type	Pennant	Other notes
5 January	United States Navy	Saginaw		Steamer		Initially launched as USS Toucey
1 August	French Navy	Gloire		Ironclad battleship		
Unknown	United States Navy	Richmond		Sloop		
