= List of ship commissionings in 1937 =

This is a chronological list of ship commissionings in 1937.

	Operator	Ship	Flag	Class and type	Pennant	Other notes
12 March	Estonian Navy	Kalev		Kalev-class submarine		
14 April	Estonian Navy	Lembit		Kalev-class submarine		
15 April	Kriegsmarine	U-32		Type VIIA submarine	U-32	
21 April	United States Navy	Langley		Seaplane tender	AV-3	Recommissioning; formerly aircraft carrier USS Langley (CV-1)
1 August	Luftwaffe	Greif		Tug-type light seaplane tender		

== Bibliography ==
- Gröner, Erich (1991). German Warships 1815–1945. Vol. Two: U-boats and Mine Warfare (Revised and expanded ed.). Annapolis, Maryland: Naval Institute Press. ISBN 1-55750-301-X.
