= List of ship commissionings in 1785 =

The list of ship commissionings in 1785 includes a chronological list of all ships commissioned in 1785.

	Operator	Ship	Flag	Class and type	Pennant	Other notes
Unknown	Dano-Norwegian Navy	HDMS Søehesten		Barge		
