= List of ship decommissionings in 1910 =

The list of ship decommissionings in 1910 includes a chronological list of ships decommissioned in 1910. In cases where no official decommissioning ceremony was held, the date of withdrawal from service may be used instead. For ships lost at sea, see list of shipwrecks in 1910 instead.

	Operator	Ship	Flag	Class and type	Fate	Other notes
19 February	Imperial German Navy	Sachsen		Sachsen-class ironclad	Scrapped 1919	

== Bibliography ==
- Lyon, David (1979). "Germany". In Chesneau, Roger & Kolesnik, Eugene M. (eds.). Conway's All the World's Fighting Ships 1860–1905. New York: Mayflower Books. pp. 240–265. ISBN 0-8317-0302-4.
