= List of ship commissionings in 1990 =

The list of ship commissionings in 1990 includes a chronological list of all ships commissioned in 1990.

	Operator	Ship	Flag	Class and type	Pennant	Other notes
25 April	Royal Netherlands Navy	Zeeleeuw		Walrus-class submarine	S803	
16 June	United States Navy	Monterey		Ticonderoga-class cruiser	CG-61	
30 June	United States Navy	Miami		Los Angeles-class submarine	SSN-755	
17 November	United States Navy	Tortuga		Whidbey Island-class dock landing ship	LSD-46	
December	People's Liberation Army Navy	Changzheng 5		Type 091 submarine	405	Date of initial operational capability
