= List of ship commissionings in 1925 =

The list of ship commissionings in 1925 is a chronological list of ships commissioned in 1925. In cases where no official commissioning ceremony was held, the date of service entry may be used instead.

	Operator	Ship	Class and type	Pennant	Other notes
24 March	Royal Netherlands Navy	HNLMS K XI	K XI-class submarine	K XI	
11 May	Royal Netherlands Navy	HNLMS Java	Java-class cruiser		
19 May	Royal Netherlands Navy	HNLMS K XII	K XI-class submarine	K XII	
3 July	Norway	Dronning Maud	Passenger ship		
31 December	Spanish Navy	B-5	B-class submarine	B-5	

== Sources ==
- http://www.netherlandsnavy.nl/Javacl.html
- https://web.archive.org/web/20131005094320/http://www.dutchsubmarines.com/classes/class_kxi.htm
