= List of ship commissionings in 1921 =

The list of ship commissionings in 1921 is a chronological list of ships commissioned in 1921. In cases where no official commissioning ceremony was held, the date of service entry may be used instead.

	Operator	Ship	Flag	Class and type	Pennant	Other notes
26 January	Spanish Navy	Kanguro		Submarine rescue ship		
27 April	Royal Netherlands Navy	K IV		K III-class submarine	K IV	
21 July	United States Navy	Maryland		Colorado-class battleship	BB-46	
10 August	United States Navy	California		Tennessee-class battleship	BB-44	
11 October	Royal Netherlands Navy	K VI		K V-class submarine	K VI	
16 December	United States Navy	Salinas		Patoka-class oiler	AO-19	
Unknown	Chilean Navy	Almirante Latorre		Almirante Latorre-class battleship		Purchased from the Royal Navy
