= List of ship decommissionings in 1981 =

The list of ship decommissionings in 1981 includes a chronological list of all ships decommissioned in 1981.

	Operator	Ship	Flag	Class and type	Fate	Other notes
February	Sessan Linjen	Prinsessan Desirée	Sweden	Ferry	Transferred to Stena Sessan Line	
7 March	Royal Navy	Norfolk	United Kingdom	County-class destroyer	Sold to Chile	Renamed Capitán Prat
March	Unknown	Tor Scandinavia	Sweden	Cruiseferry	End of charter, returned to Tor Line	
27 March	Royal Navy	Bulwark	United Kingdom	Centaur-class aircraft carrier	Towed to Cairnryan 10 April 1981	Scrapped in 1984
30 April	Jakob Lines	Borea	Finland	Ferry	Chartered to Folkline	
April	Stena Sessan Line	Prinsessan Desirée	Sweden	Ferry	Chartered to Bandi Line	
6 May	Bandi Line	Prinsessan Desirée	Sweden	Ferry	End of charter from Stena Sessan Line	Re-chartered to B&I Line
13 May	Folkline	Borea	Finland	Ferry	End of charter; returned to Jakob Lines	
15 May	Olau Line	Olau Finn	Finland	Ferry	Laid up at end of charter; sold to Folkline in May 1982	Renamed Folkliner
7 June	B&I Line	Prinsessan Desirée	Sweden	Ferry	End of charter from Stena Sessan Line	Re-chartered to Sealink
10 August	Sealink	Prinsessan Desirée	Sweden	Ferry	End of charter from Stena Sessan Line	Returned to Stena Sessan traffic
3 October	Jakob Lines	Borea	Finland	Ferry	Chartered as a housing ship to Algeria	Sold to Helsingfors Steamship Company, 1984
1 December	Tor Line	Tor Scandinavia	Sweden	Cruiseferry	Sold to DFDS Seaways	
Date unknown	Polferries	Gryf	Poland	Ferry	Sold to Fraglines	Renamed Eolos

== Bibliography ==
- Hobbs, David (2013). British Aircraft Carriers: Design, Development and Service Histories. Barnsley, UK: Seaforth Publishing. ISBN 978-1-84832-138-0.
