= List of ship decommissionings in 1927 =

The list of ship decommissionings in 1927 includes a chronological list of ships decommissioned in 1927. In cases where no official decommissioning ceremony was held, the date of withdrawal from service may be used instead. For ships lost at sea, see list of shipwrecks in 1927 instead.

Date	Operator	Ship	Class and type	Fate and other notes	Ref
14 July	United States Navy	USS T-3	AA-1-class submarine	Ex-AA-3; sold for scrap	
10 November	Royal Australian Navy	HMAS Geranium	Arabis-class sloop	dismantled 1932; sunk as target 1935	
28 December	Spanish Navy	Princesa de Asturias	Princesa de Asturias-class armored cruiser	sold 1929; stricken 1930; scrapped	
