= List of ship decommissionings in 1951 =

The list of ship decommissionings in 1951 is a chronological list of ships decommissioned in 1951. In cases where no official decommissioning ceremony was held, the date of withdrawal from service may be used instead. For ships lost at sea, see list of shipwrecks in 1951 instead.

Date	Operator	Ship	Class and type	Fate and other notes
5 April	Spanish Navy	B-2	B-class submarine	Sank under tow to breakers 28 November 1951
June	Spanish Navy	C-2	C-class submarine	Sank under tow to breakers
5 October	United States Navy	USS Moore (DE‑147)	Edsall-class destroyer escort	Placed in reserve until recommission
7 November	United States Navy	USS KST-973	LST‑542-class tank landing ship	Transferred immediately to the French Navy; struck from U.S. register 20 November 1951.
29 October	United States Navy	USS Glendale (PF-36)	Tacoma-class patrol frigate	Transferred to the Royal Thai Navy
