= List of ship commissionings in 1958 =

The list of ship commissionings in 1958 includes a chronological list of all ships commissioned in 1958.

	Operator	Ship	Flag	Class and type	Pennant	Other notes
29 August	German Navy	Seeadler		Seeadler-class fast attack craft	S6	First in class
7 November	United States Navy	Edson	Forrest Sherman-class destroyer	DD-946		
