= List of ship decommissionings in 1979 =

The list of ship decommissionings in 1979 includes a chronological list of all ships decommissioned in 1979.

	Operator	Ship	Flag	Class and type	Fate	Other notes
2 January	Svea Line (Finland)	Fennia	Finland	ferry	Chartered to SAGA Linjen	
January	Tor Line	Tor Scandinavia	Sweden	Cruiseferry	Chartered to Holland Expo	
1 February	SAGA Linjen	Fennia	Finland	ferry	End of charter, returned to Svea Line (Finland)	
26 February	Holland Expo	Tor Scandinavia	Sweden	Cruiseferry	End of charter, returned to Tor Line	
February	Stena Line	Stena Oceanica	Sweden	ferry	Rebuilt into Stena Saga	
26 April	Rederi AB Slite	Diana	Sweden	ferry	Sold to Oy Vaasa-Umeå Ab	Renamed Botnia Express; chartered for Rederi AB Slite
15 June	Rederi AB Slite	Botnia Express	Finland	ferry	Entered traffic with Oy Vaasa-Umeå Ab	Under charter from Oy Vaasa-Umeå Ab
September	Rederi AB Slite	Diana II av Slite	Sweden	Cruiseferry	Renamed Diana II	Continued in same traffic
September	Italia Crociere	Galileo Galilei	Italy	Cruise ship	Laid up; sold to Chandris Fantasy Cruises in 1983	Renamed Galileo
