= List of ship decommissionings in 1893 =

The list of ship decommissionings in 1893 is a chronological list of ships decommissioned in 1893. In cases where no official decommissioning ceremony was held, the date of withdrawal from service may be used instead. For ships lost at sea, see list of shipwrecks in 1893 instead.

Date	Operator	Ship	Pennant	Class and type	Fate and other notes
Unknown date	Spanish Navy	Carmén	–	Concepción-class screw frigate	Ex-Nuestra Señora del Carmén; sold for scrapping in 1897
Unknown date	Spanish Navy	Lealtad	–	Lealtad-class screw frigate	Hulked; sold for scrapping in 1897
