= List of ship commissionings in 1859 =

The list of ship commissionings in 1859 is a chronological list of all ships commissioned in 1859. In cases where no official commissioning ceremony was held, the date of service entry may be used instead.

| | Operator | Ship | Class and type | Pennant | Other notes |
|---|---|---|---|---|---|
| 8 October | Spanish Navy | Virgen de Covadonga | Screw schooner | – | |
| 29 November | United States Navy | USS Mohican | Steam sloop-of-war | – | |
| Unknown date | Spanish Navy | Princesa de Asturias | Screw frigate | – | Commissioned on either 1 November or 14 December |
| Unknown date | Spanish Navy | Reina Blanca | Petronila-class screw frigate | – | |

== Bibliography ==
- Silverstone, Paul H. (2006). Civil War Navies 1855–1883. The U.S. Navy Warship Series. New York: Routledge. ISBN 978-0-415-97870-5.
