= List of ship commissionings in 2022 =

This list of ship commissionings in 2022 includes a chronological list of all ships commissioned in 2022.

Date	Operator	Ship	Class and type	Pennant	Notes
5 February	United States Navy	Savannah	Independence-class littoral combat ship	LCS-28	
14 May	United States Navy	Frank E. Petersen Jr.	Arleigh Burke-class destroyer	DDG-121	
21 May	United States Navy	Minneapolis-Saint Paul	Freedom-class littoral combat ship	LCS-21	
28 May	United States Navy	Oregon	Virginia-class attack submarine	SSN-793	
25 June	United States Navy	Montana	Virginia-class attack submarine	SSN-794	
30 July	United States Navy	Fort Lauderdale	San Antonio-class amphibious transport dock	LPD-28	
