= List of ship commissionings in 1895 =

The list of ship commissionings in 1895 is a chronological list of ships commissioned in 1895. In cases where no official commissioning ceremony was held, the date of service entry may be used instead.

Date	Operator	Ship	Flag	Class and type	Pennant	Other notes
16 March	Imperial Japanese Navy	Saien		Protected cruiser		
24 March	Austro-Hungarian Navy	SMS Kaiserin und Königin Maria Theresia		Armoured cruiser		
24 July	Royal Navy	HMS Flora		Astraea-class cruiser		
15 August	United States Navy	USS Texas		Pre-dreadnought battleship		
17 September	United States Navy	USS Maine		Armored cruiser	Sometimes considered second-class battleship	
20 November	United States Navy	USS Indiana		Indiana-class battleship		
12 December	Royal Navy	HMS Magnificent		Majestic-class battleship		
12 December	Royal Navy	HMS Majestic		Majestic-class battleship		

== Bibliography ==
- Roberts, John (1979). "Great Britain (including Empire Forces)". In Chesneau, Roger & Kolesnik, Eugene M. (eds.). Conway's All the World's Fighting Ships 1860–1905. New York: Mayflower Books. pp. 1–113. ISBN 0-8317-0302-4.
