= List of ship decommissionings in 1912 =

The list of ship decommissionings in 1912 includes a chronological list of ships decommissioned in 1912. In cases where no official decommissioning ceremony was held, the date of withdrawal from service may be used instead. For ships lost at sea, see list of shipwrecks in 1912 instead.

Date	Operator	Ship	Pennant	Class and type	Fate and other notes
June 28	United States Navy	A-5	Submarine Torpedo Boat No. 6	Plunger-class submarine	placed in reserve at Puget Sound Navy Yard and later shipped to the Philippines
November 28	United States Navy	A-3	Submarine Torpedo Boat No. 4	Plunger-class submarine	to the Pacific Reserve Fleet, later shipped to the Philippines
Unknown date	Spanish Navy	Numancia	–	Coastal defense ship	Ex-armored frigate; wrecked under tow to breakers 1916
