= List of ship commissionings in 1949 =

The list of ship commissionings in 1949 includes a chronological list of ships commissioned in 1949.

Date	Operator	Ship	Class and type	Notes
4 April	United States Navy	USS Roanoke (CL-145)	Worcester-class light cruiser	
14 May	United States Navy	USS Salem (CA-139)	Des Moines-class heavy cruiser	
2 August	Royal Navy	HMS Owen	Loch-class survey ship	
26 August	Royal Danish Navy	HDMS GALATHEA	Grimbsy-class survey ship	
15 October	Royal Danish Navy	HDMS Holm	Krieger-class torpedo boat	
Unknown date	Royal Danish Navy	HDMS Buhl	Krieger-class torpedo boat	
Unknown date	Royal Danish Navy	HDMS HÆRFUGLEN	torpedo boat	
Unknown date	Royal Danish Navy	HDMS HØGEN	torpedo boat	
Unknown date	Royal Danish Navy	HDMS ISFUGLEN	torpedo boat	
Unknown date	Royal Danish Navy	HDMS JAGTFALKEN	torpedo boat	
Unknown date	Royal Danish Navy	HDMS MR 167	minesweeper	
Unknown date	Royal Danish Navy	HDMS MR 167	minesweeper	
Unknown date	Royal Danish Navy	HDMS Raagen	torpedo boat	
Unknown date	Royal Danish Navy	HDMS T-54	torpedo boat	
Unknown date	Royal Danish Navy	HDMS T-55	torpedo boat	
Unknown date	Royal Danish Navy	HDMS T-56	torpedo boat	
Unknown date	Royal Danish Navy	HDMS T-57	torpedo boat	
Unknown date	Royal Danish Navy	HDMS T-59	torpedo boat	
Unknown date	Trinity House	Sandettie	Lightvessel	
