= List of shipwrecks in 1916 =

The list of shipwrecks in 1916 includes ships sunk, foundered, grounded, or otherwise lost during 1916.

table of contents
1916
Jan	Feb	Mar	Apr
May	Jun	Jul	Aug
Sep	Oct	Nov	Dec
Unknown date

== Unknown date ==
List of shipwrecks: Unknown date 1916
Ship	State	Description
Alioni Marceline	Belgium	World War I: The fishing vessel was sunk by enemy action in November or early December.
Brighton	Australia	The hulk was abandoned in Pindimar Bay, Port Stephens, New South Wales (32°40′12″S 152°07′29″E).
Edinburgh	United Kingdom	World War I: The barque was sunk in the Atlantic Ocean between Fernando de Noronha and the coast of Brazil by SMS Möwe (Imperial German Navy some time between 17 January and 9 February.
Flamenco	United Kingdom	World War I: The cargo ship was sunk in the Atlantic Ocean between Fernando de Noronha and the coast of Brazil by SMS Möwe (Imperial German Navy) between 17 January and 9 February.
Horace	United Kingdom	World War I: The cargo ship was sunk in the Atlantic Ocean between Fernando de Noronha and the coast of Brazil by SMS Möwe (Imperial German Navy) between 17 January and 9 February.
RFA Innistrahull	Royal Navy	The Innis-class water carrier was lost during March or April 1916.
HMS Julnar	Royal Navy	World War I: Mesopotamian campaign: The paddle steamer was sunk by Ottoman guns on either the Tigris or Euphrates River.
Luxembourg	Belgium	World War I: The cargo ship was sunk in the Atlantic Ocean between Fernando de Noronha and the coast of Brazil by SMS Möwe (Imperial German Navy) between 17 January and 9 February.
Tac	United Kingdom	World War I: The trawler was sunk by enemy action in late November or early December. Her crew were rescued.
SM UB-7	Imperial German Navy	World War I: The Type UB I submarine departed Varna, Romania on 27 September for a patrol in the Black Sea. Subsequently either struck a mine or bombed and sunk with the loss of all fifteen crew.
SM UB-44	Imperial German Navy	World War I: The Type UB II submarine was lost in the Gulf of Kotor whilst on patrol.
Victorian	United Kingdom	World War I: The passenger ship was torpedoed and sunk in the Mediterranean Sea off Malta.
Volante	United States	While under tow by the motor tugs Gjoa and Penguin (both United States), the schooner's towline parted during a gale and she sank without loss of life in Chatham Strait in the Alexander Archipelago in Southeast Alaska.
