= List of ship decommissionings in 1915 =

The list of ship decommissionings in 1915 includes a chronological list of ships decommissioned in 1915. In cases where no official decommissioning ceremony was held, the date of withdrawal from service may be used instead. For ships lost at sea, see list of shipwrecks in 1915 instead.

| Date | Operator | Ship | Pennant | Class and type | Fate and other notes |
|---|---|---|---|---|---|
| February | Imperial German Navy | SMS Kaiser Friedrich III | | Kaiser Friedrich III-class battleship | Sold for scrap in 1920 |
