= List of ship decommissionings in 1898 =

The list of ship decommissionings in 1898 is a chronological list of ships decommissioned in 1898. In cases where no official decommissioning ceremony was held, the date of withdrawal from service may be used instead. For ships lost at sea, see list of shipwrecks in 1898 instead.

Date	Operator	Ship	Pennant	Class and type	Fate and other notes
September 2	United States Navy	Nahant		Passaic-class monitor	Sold for scrap on 6 April 1904
September 11	United States Navy	Passaic		Passaic-class monitor	Sold for scrap on 10 October 1899
September 22	United States Navy	Catskill		Passaic-class monitor	Sold for scrap on 4 December 1901
