= List of ship decommissionings in 1964 =

The list of ship decommissionings in 1964 is a chronological list of ships decommissioned in 1964.

Date	Operator	Ship	Class and type	Fate	Other notes
1 July	Spanish Navy	Galicia	Almirante Cervera-class light cruiser	Also reported decommissioned on 9 January 1970; scrapped 1970	
20 July	United States Navy	Thetis Bay	Casablanca-class amphibious assault ship	Scrapped	

== Bibliography ==
"Thetis Bay (CVE-90)". Dictionary of American Naval Fighting Ships. Navy Department, Naval History and Heritage Command.
