= List of ship commissionings in 1874 =

The list of ship commissionings in 1874 includes a chronological list of all ships commissioned in 1874.

Date	Operator	Ship	Pennant	Class and type	Notes
May 2	Argentine Navy	Paraná		Steam and sail corvette	
May 11	United States Navy	Swatara		Screw sloop	Complete re-build of USS Swatara
June 15	Romanian Flotilla Corps	Fulgerul		Gunboat	
October 10	United States Navy	Saugus		Canonicus-class monitor	recommissioned at Key West
December 28	Chilean Navy	Magallanes		Corvette	
Unknown	United States Navy	Alarm		Experimental torpedo boat	
