= List of ship commissionings in 1786 =

The list of ship commissionings in 1786 includes a chronological list of ships commissioned in 1786. In cases where no official commissioning ceremony was held, the date of service entry may be used instead.

| Date | Operator | Ship | Class and type | Notes |
|---|---|---|---|---|
| unknown date | Royal Dano-Norwegian Navy | Aalborg | gunboat | |
| unknown date | Royal Dano-Norwegian Navy | Aggershus | cavalry pram | |
| unknown date | Royal Dano-Norwegian Navy | Ahrendahl | gunboat | |
