= List of ship decommissionings in 1941 =

The list of ship decommissionings in 1941 is a chronological list of all ships decommissioned in 1941. In cases where no official decommissioning ceremony was held, the date of withdrawal from service may be used instead. For ships lost at sea, see list of shipwrecks in 1941 instead.

	Operator	Ship	Class and type	Fate	Other notes
29 May	Kriegsmarine	WBS 8 August Wriedt	weather ship	captured by HMS Malvernian (Royal Navy)	
31 July	Spanish Navy	B-4	B-class submarine	Scrapped	
31 July	Kriegsmarine	UB	Grampus-class submarine	formerly HMS Seal (N37) (Royal Navy)	
21 October	Spanish Navy	B-1	B-class submarine	Sunk as target 1949	
October	Royal Navy	HMS Philomel	Pearl-class protected cruiser	transferred to Royal New Zealand Navy	
Unknown date	Soviet Navy	Russian battleship Poltava	Gangut-class battleship		

== Bibliography ==
- Gröner, Erich (1991). German Warships 1815–1945. Vol. Two: U-boats and Mine Warfare (Revised and Expanded ed.). Annapolis, Maryland: Naval Institute Press. ISBN 1-55750-301-X.
