= List of ship decommissionings in 1967 =

The list of ship decommissionings in 1967 includes a chronological list of all ships decommissioned in 1967.

	Operator	Ship	Flag	Class and type	Fate	Other notes
15 June	TT-Line (chartered from Finnlines)	Finndana	Finland	Ferry	Sold to Polferries	Renamed Gryf
September	Rederi AB Slite	Apollo	Sweden	Ferry	Sold to La Traverse Nord-Sud Ltd	Renamed Manic
