= List of ship commissionings in 1857 =

The list of ship commissionings in 1857 is a chronological list of ships commissioned in 1857. In cases where no official commissioning ceremony was held, the date of service entry may be used instead.

	Operator	Ship	Class and type	Pennant	Other notes
September	Spanish Navy	Berenguela	Petronila-class screw frigate	–	
