= List of ship commissionings in 1884 =

The list of ship commissionings in 1884 is a chronological list of ships commissioned in 1884. In cases where no official commissioning ceremony was held, the date of service entry may be used instead.

| Date | Operator | Ship | Pennant | Class and type | Notes |
|---|---|---|---|---|---|
| June 16 | United States Navy | USS Nantucket | | Passaic-class monitor | Recommissioned from reserve |
| March 13 | Imperial Japanese Navy | Kaimon | | Sloop-of-war | |
