= List of ship decommissionings in 2016 =

The list of ship decommissionings in 2016 includes a chronological list of ships decommissioned in 2016.

	Operator	Ship	Flag	Class and type	Pennant	Fate	Other notes
Unclear	Royal Fleet Auxiliary	Black Rover	United Kingdom	Rover class tanker	A273	Awaiting disposal	Laid up and didn't receive a formal decommissioning ceremony.
Unclear	Royal Fleet Auxiliary	Diligence	United Kingdom	Forward repair ship	A132	Awaiting disposal	Laid up and didn't receive a formal decommissioning ceremony.
