= List of ship decommissionings in 1980 =

The list of ship decommissionings in 1980 includes a chronological list of all ships decommissioned in 1980.

	Operator	Ship	Flag	Class and type	Fate	Other notes
17 January	Tor Line	Tor Scandinavia	Sweden	Cruiseferry	Chartered to Scan Arab Expo	
6 March	Scan Arab Expo	Tor Scandinavia	Sweden	Cruiseferry	End of charter, returned to Tor Line	
July	Royal Navy	Kent		County-class destroyer	Scrapped	Accommodation ship until 1987 and training hulk until 1993
11 July	Bore Line	Bore Star	Finland	Ferry	Sold to Effoa	Continued in Silja Line traffic
1 September	Effoa	Silja Star	Finland	Ferry	Renamed Silja Star	Continued in Silja Line traffic
16 December	Tor Line	Tor Scandinavia	Sweden	Cruiseferry	Chartered to an unknown Dutch company	
Date uncertain	Royal Navy	London		County-class destroyer	Sold to Pakistan	Renamed PNS Babur
Date uncertain	Yugoslav Navy	Split	(Socialist Federal Republic of Yugoslavia) Yugoslavia	Destroyer	Decommissioned	Scrapped in 1986

== Bibliography ==
- Friedman, Norman (2006). British Destroyers and Frigates, the Second World War and After. Annapolis, Maryland: Naval Institute Press. ISBN 1-86176-137-6.
