= List of ship commissionings in 1868 =

The list of ship commissionings in 1868 is a chronological list of ships commissioned in 1868. In cases where no official commissioning ceremony was held, the date of service entry may be used instead.

Date	Operator	Ship	Pennant	Class and type	Notes
February	Spanish Navy	Vitoria	–	Armored frigate	
July	Spanish Navy	Zaragoza	–	Armored frigate	
Unknown date	Spanish Navy	Arapiles	–	Armored frigate	Handed over to Spanish Navy on 14 September.
