= List of ship commissionings in 1871 =

The list of ship commissionings in 1871 is a chronological list of ships commissioned in 1871. In cases where no official commissioning ceremony was held, the date of service entry may be used instead.

	Operator	Ship	Class and type	Pennant	Other notes
6 December	Royal Navy	Simoom	Iron-screw troopship		
