= List of ship decommissionings in 1949 =

The list of ship decommissionings in 1949 includes a chronological list of all ships decommissioned in 1949. In cases where no official decommissioning ceremony was held, the date of withdrawal from service may be used instead. For ships lost at sea, see list of shipwrecks in 1949 instead.

	Operator	Ship	Class and type	Fate	Other notes
15 January	United States Navy	USS Antietam	Essex-class aircraft carrier	Reserve	Recommissioned in 1951
21 January	United States Navy	USS Princeton	Essex-class aircraft carrier	Reserve	Recommissioned in 1950
January	United States Navy	USS Siboney	Commencement Bay-class escort carrier	Reserve	Recommissioned in 1950
30 June	United States Navy	USS Tarawa	Essex-class aircraft carrier	Reserve	Recommissioned in 1951
29 July	Soviet Navy	Zhivuchy	Wickes-class destroyer	Stricken	
Unknown date	Spanish Navy	Ceuta	Vifor-class destroyer	Scrapped	

== Bibliography ==
- Budzbon, Przemysław; Radziemski, Jan & Twardowski, Marek (2022). Warships of the Soviet Fleets 1939–1945. Vol. I: Major Combatants. Annapolis, Maryland: Naval Institute Press. ISBN 978-1-68247-877-6.
