= List of shipwrecks in 1886 =

The list of shipwrecks in 1886 includes ships sunk, foundered, grounded, or otherwise lost during 1886.

table of contents
← 1885 / 1886 / 1887 →
Jan	Feb	Mar	Apr
May	Jun	Jul	Aug
Sep	Oct	Nov	Dec
Unknown date

== Unknown date ==
List of shipwrecks: Unknown date in 1886
Ship	State	Description
Axel	Sweden	The barque foundered in the Atlantic Ocean, according to a message in a bottle that washed up at Cádiz, Spain in December.
Boyne	United Kingdom	The sailing ship was wrecked without loss of life on False Point, India. She was on a voyage from Suva, Fiji, to Calcutta, India.
Catherine	United Kingdom	The whaler, a brig, was wrecked at "Cumberland Gulf", Greenland. Her 24 crew survived.
Eagle	Flag unknown	The yacht was driven ashore and wrecked at Kingsville, Ontario, Canada during the last week of March or on 1 April.
Ferntower	United Kingdom	The ship foundered in the Saigon River with the loss of fifty lives.
René	France	The ship was wrecked at Overton Cliffs, Glamorgan, United Kingdom. There were five survivors.
Seth Stockbridge	United States	The fishing schooner was lost off Greenland early in the Summer with all fourteen hands.
Thornton	Canada	The sealing schooner was battered to pieces at Unalaska on Unalaska Island in the Fox Islands in the eastern Aleutian Islands, Department of Alaska sometime during or after 1886.
Tsengora	Canada	The full-rigged ship was lost at Spring Lake, New Jersey, United States.
W. C. Warner	Flag unknown	The brig was lost at Mantoloking, New Jersey, United States.
Western Shore	United States	The sloop was lost in Bristol Bay in the Department of Alaska.
