= List of ship decommissionings in 1960 =

The list of ship decommissionings in 1960 includes a chronological list of all ships decommissioned in 1960.

	Operator	Ship	Class and type	Fate	Other notes
3 February	United States Navy	Tarawa	Essex class aircraft carrier	Scrapped	Reserve until stricken in 1967
9 May	(Finland) Finnish Board of Navigation	Sampo	Icebreaker	Scrapped	
