= List of ship decommissionings in 1936 =

The list of ship decommissionings in 1936 is a chronological list of ships decommissioned in 1936. In cases where no official decommissioning ceremony was held, the date of withdrawal from service may be used instead. For ships lost at sea, see list of shipwrecks in 1936 instead.

Date	Operator	Ship	Class and type	Fate and other notes	Ref
21 March	United States Coast Guard	USCGC Seneca (1908)	cutter	decommissioned at the Coast Guard Depot and sold to the Boston Iron and Metal Company of Baltimore on 3 September 1936	
19 June	Royal Australian Navy	HMAS Tattoo	Admiralty S-class destroyer	sold to Penguins Limited for ship breaking on 4 June 1937	
July (unknown date)	Portuguese Navy	NRP Hidra	Foca-class submarine	Stricken date. Later scrapped.	
November (unknown date)	Royal Netherlands Navy	HNLMS O 6	submarine	-	
Unknown date	United States Coast Guard	USCGC Dexter (1925)	steel-hulled patrol boat	given to the U.S. Navy, in Buffalo New York, and renamed "YP-63"	
Unknown date	United States Coast Guard	USS Elmasada	motorboat	-	
Unknown date	Swedish Navy	HSwMS Magne (1905)	torpedo boat destroyer	laid up at the end of 1918, and stricken in 1936	
Unknown date	French Navy	Maurice Callot	minelayer submarine	-	
Unknown date	French Navy	Pierre Chailley	minelayer submarine	-	
