= List of ship commissionings in 1957 =

The list of ship commissionings in 1957 includes a chronological list of all ships decommissioned in 1957.

	Operator	Ship	Class and type	Pennant	Other notes
17 January	Royal Canadian Navy	Bonaventure	Majestic-class aircraft carrier	CVL 22	Former HMS Powerful
10 August	United States Navy	Ranger	Forrestal-class aircraft carrier	CVA-61	

== Bibliography ==
- Friedman, Norman (1995). "United States". In Chumbley, Stephen (ed.). Conway's All The World's Fighting Ships 1947–1995. Annapolis, Maryland: Naval Institute Press. pp. 544–634. ISBN 1-55750-132-7.
