= List of ship commissionings in 1987 =

The list of ship commissionings in 1987 includes a chronological list of all ships commissioned in 1987.

	Operator	Ship	Flag	Class and type	Pennant	Other notes
20 February	Royal Netherlands Navy	Hellevoetsluis		Alkmaar-class minehunter	M859	
21 February	United States Navy	Mobile Bay		Ticonderoga-class cruiser	CG-53	
28 February	United States Navy	Kauffman		Oliver Hazard Perry-class frigate	FFG-59	
7 May	Royal Netherlands Navy	Zierikzee		Alkmaar-class minehunter	M862	
9 May	United States Navy	Rodney M. Davis		Oliver Hazard Perry-class frigate	FFG-60	
6 June	United States Navy	Antietam		Ticonderoga-class cruiser	CG-54	
10 July	People's Liberation Army Navy	Guilin		Type 051 destroyer	164	
8 August	United States Navy	Fort McHenry		Whidbey Island-class dock landing ship	LSD-43	
12 August	Chilean Navy	Blanco Encalada		County-class destroyer	D15	Purchase date from the Royal Navy for former HMS Fife
22 August	United States Navy	Thomas S. Gates		Ticonderoga-class cruiser	CG-51	
26 September	United States Navy	Leyte Gulf		Ticonderoga-class cruiser	CG-55	
