= List of ship commissionings in 1920 =

The list of ship commissionings in 1920 is a chronological list of ships commissioned in 1920. In cases where no official commissioning ceremony was held, the date of service entry may be used instead.

Date	Operator	Ship	Class and type	Notes	Ref
31 January	United States Navy	AA-1	AA-1-class submarine		
February (unknown date)	United States Navy	Sapelo	Patoka-class oiler		
15 May	Royal Navy	Hood	Admiral-class battlecruiser		
3 June	United States Navy	Tennessee	Tennessee-class battleship		
9 July	Royal Netherlands Navy	K III	K III-class submarine		
21 August	Royal Netherlands Navy	Z 3	Z 1-class torpedo boat		
4 September	United States Navy	Trinity	Patoka-class oiler		
15 September	Royal Netherlands Navy	K V	K V-class submarine		
23 November	United States Navy	Abel P. Upshur	Clemson-class destroyer		
7 December	United States Navy	T-3	AA-1-class submarine		
