= List of ship commissionings in 1875 =

The list of ship commissionings in 1875 includes a chronological list of all ships commissioned in 1875.

Date	Operator	Ship	Pennant	Class and type	Notes	Ref
unknown date	United States Navy	Catskill		Passaic-class monitor	Recommissioned from reserve; may have been in early 1876	
