= List of ship decommissionings in 1998 =

The list of ship decommissionings in 1998 includes a chronological list of all ships decommissioned in 1998.

	Operator	Ship	Flag	Class and type	Fate	Other notes
16 March	Russian Navy	Razumnyy		Project 1135 large anti-submarine ship	Scrapped	
31 March	United States Navy	Fahrion		Oliver Hazard Perry-class frigate	Transferred to Egypt in 1998	Renamed Sharm El-Sheik
7 July	United States Navy	Arkansas		Virginia-class cruiser	Scrapped	
25 August	United States Navy	Guam		Iwo Jima-class amphibious assault ship	Storage	James River
18 September	United States Navy	Lewis B. Puller		Oliver Hazard Perry-class frigate	Transferred to Egypt in 1998	Renamed Toushka
30 September	United States Navy	Independence		Forrestal-class aircraft carrier	Reserve	
