= List of ship decommissionings in 1924 =

The list of ship decommissionings in 1924 is a chronological list of ships decommissioned in 1924. In cases where no official decommissioning ceremony was held, the date of withdrawal from service may be used instead. For ships lost at sea, see list of shipwrecks in 1924 instead.

Date	Operator	Ship	Class and type	Fate and other notes
1 August	Spanish Navy	Pelayo	battleship	Sold 1926 for scrapping
6 June	Spanish Navy	Audaz	Furor-class destroyer	Scrapped 1925
30 October	Spanish Navy	Terror	Furor-class destroyer	Scrapped 1924
