= List of ship commissionings in 1863 =

The list of ship commissionings in 1863 is a chronological list of ships commissioned in 1863. In cases where no official commissioning ceremony was held, the date of service entry may be used instead.

Date	Operator	Ship	Pennant	Class and type	Fate and other notes	Ref
7 January	United States Navy	USS Patapsco	–	Passaic-class monitor		
18 January	United States Navy	USS Weehawken	–	Passaic-class monitor		
9 February	United States Navy	USS Sangamon	–	Passaic-class monitor		
24 February	United States Navy	USS Catskill	–	Passaic-class monitor		
26 February	United States Navy	USS Nantucket	–	Passaic-class monitor		
12 November	Spanish Navy	Villa de Madrid	–	Screw frigate	Scrapped 1884	
