= List of ship decommissionings in 1874 =

The list of ship decommissionings in 1874 includes a chronological list of all ships decommissioned in 1874.

Date	Operator	Ship	Pennant	Class and type	Fate and other notes
March 9	United States Navy	Saugus		Canonicus-class monitor	Laid up at Key West until recommissioned later in 1874
