= List of ship decommissionings in 1972 =

The list of ship decommissionings in 1972 is a chronological list of ships decommissioned in 1972.

	Operator	Ship	Flag	Class and type	Fate	Other notes
27 January	Swedish Lloyd	Hispania	Sweden	Ferry		Renamed Saga after sale of the previous Saga to Stena Line
7 February	Swedish Lloyd	Saga	Sweden	Ferry	Sold to Stena Line	Renamed Stena Atlantica
7 May	United States Navy	Cubera		Balao-class submarine	Sold to Venezuela	Renamed Tiburon (S-12)
1 July	United States Navy	Wasp		Essex-class aircraft carrier	Scrapped	
26 July	Rederi Ab Ålandsfärjan	Ålandsfärjan	Finland	Ferry	Scrapped	
28 July	United States Navy	Dealey		Dealey-class destroyer escort	Transferred to Uruguay	Renamed 18 De Julio (DE-3)

== Bibliography ==
- "Wasp IX (CV-18)". Dictionary of American Naval Fighting Ships. Navy Department, Naval History and Heritage Command.
