= List of ship decommissionings in 1877 =

The list of ship decommissionings in 1877 is a chronological list of ships decommissioned in 1877. In cases where no official decommissioning ceremony was held, the date of withdrawal from service may be used instead. For ships lost at sea, see list of shipwrecks in 1877 instead.

Date	Operator	Ship	Pennant	Class and type	Fate and other notes
January 13	United States Navy	USS Potomac	–	Raritan-class frigate	Sold
January 22	United States Navy	USS Shawmut	–	Steamship	Sold
June 1	United States Navy	USS Dictator	–	Monitor	Sold
October 8	United States Navy	USS Saugus	–	Canonicus-class monitor	Laid up at Washington Navy Yard; condemned in 1886; sold in 1891
October 31	United States Navy	USS Frolic	–	Sidewheel paddle steamer	ex-USS Advance; sold
Unknown date	Spanish Navy	Berenguela	–	Petronila-class screw frigate	Hulked as floating dock since 1875
Unknown date	United States Navy	USS Canonicus	–	Canonicus-class monitor	To reserve; sold in 1908
Unknown date	United States Navy	USS Catskill	–	Passaic-class monitor	Decommissioning may have been in early 1878; to reserve; recommissioned in 1898
