= List of ship commissionings in 1877 =

The list of ship commissionings in 1877 is a chronological list of ships commissioned in 1877.

Date	Operator	Ship	Pennant	Class and type	Notes
18 January	United States Navy	USS Alliance		Enterprise-class screw gunboat	Bark-rigged
31 January	Royal Navy	HMS Alexandra	–	Central battery ironclad	
1 February	Spanish Navy	Sagunto	–	Armored frigate	
14 February	United States Navy	USS Trenton	–	Screw steamer	
16 March	United States Navy	USS Enterprise	–	Enterprise-class screw gunboat	Bark-rigged
26 May	Royal Navy	HMS Thunderer	–	Devastation-class battleship	
26 June	French Navy	Friedland		Océan-class armoured frigate	
12 July	Spanish Navy	Jorge Juan	–	Jorge Juan-class screw sloop-of-war	
12 July	Spanish Navy	Sánchez Barcáiztegui	–	Jorge Juan-class screw sloop-of-war	
17 September	Royal Navy	HMS Shannon		Armored cruiser	
