= List of ship decommissionings in 1928 =

The list of ship decommissionings in 1928 is a chronological list of ships decommissioned in 1928. In cases where no official decommissioning ceremony was held, the date of withdrawal from service may be used instead. For ships lost at sea, see list of shipwrecks in 1928 instead.

Date	Operator	Ship	Class and type	Fate and other notes	Ref
1 May	Regia Marina	F16	F-class submarine	Scrapped	
1 August	Regia Marina	F9	F-class submarine	Scrapped	
8 November	Spanish Navy	Cataluña	Princesa de Asturias-class armored cruiser	stricken and sold 1930; scrapped	
