= List of ship decommissionings in 2001 =

The list of ship decommissionings in 2001 includes a chronological list of all ships decommissioned in 2001.

	Operator	Ship	Flag	Class and type	Fate	Other notes
17 January	Royal Navy	Coventry		Type 22 frigate	Sold to Romania in 2003	Renamed Regele Ferdinand
10 May	United States Navy	L. Mendel Rivers		Sturgeon-class submarine	Submarine recycling	
19 July	United States Navy	Hewitt		Spruance-class destroyer	Sold for scrap	
15 October	United States Navy	Caron		Spruance-class destroyer	Sunk during weapons testing in 2002	
16 October	Brazilian Navy	Minas Gerais		Colossus-class aircraft carrier	Sold for scrap	
19 October	Royal Australian Navy	Brisbane		Perth-class destroyer	Sunk as a dive wreck in 2005	
26 November	Royal Navy	Cromer		Sandown-class minehunter	Transferred to Britannia Naval College as Hindostan	
