= List of ship commissionings in 1901 =

The list of ship commissionings in 1901 includes a chronological list of all ships commissioned in 1901.

Date	Operator	Ship	Flag	Class and type	Pennant	Other notes
5 May	Imperial German Navy	Kaiser Wilhelm der Grosse		Kaiser Friedrich III-class battleship		
18 May	Imperial German Navy	Ariadne		Gazelle-class cruiser		
10 June	Imperial German Navy	Kaiser Barbarossa		Kaiser Friedrich III-class battleship		
15 June	Imperial German Navy	Gazelle		Gazelle-class cruiser		
25 June	Royal Navy	Albion		Canopus-class battleship		
26 July	Imperial German Navy	Medusa		Gazelle-class cruiser		
5 September	Swedish Navy	Dristigheten		Dristigheten-class coastal defence ship		
10 September	Royal Navy	Implacable		Formidable-class battleship		
14 September	Imperial German Navy	Thetis		Gazelle-class cruiser		
16 September	United States Navy	Illinois		Illinois-class battleship	BB-7	
10 October	Royal Navy	Formidable		Formidable-class battleship		
15 November	Imperial German Navy	Amazone		Gazelle-class cruiser		
26 November	United States Navy	Wisconsin		Illinois-class battleship	BB-9	
