= List of ship commissionings in 1905 =

The list of ship commissionings in 1905 includes a chronological list of all ships commissioned in 1905.

Date	Operator	Ship	Class and type	Pennant	Other notes
10 January	Imperial German Navy	München	Bremen-class cruiser		
7 February	Royal Navy	King Edward VII	King Edward VII-class battleship		
4 April	Imperial German Navy	Berlin	Bremen-class cruiser		
26 April	Imperial German Navy	Lübeck	Bremen-class cruiser		
9 May	Royal Navy	Commonwealth	King Edward VII-class battleship		
11 July	Royal Navy	New Zealand	King Edward VII-class battleship		
12 July	Imperial German Navy	Preussen	Braunschweig-class battleship		
15 August	Royal Navy	Dominion	King Edward VII-class battleship		
22 August	Royal Navy	Hindustan	King Edward VII-class battleship		
19 September	Imperial German Navy	Hessen	Braunschweig-class battleship		
21 November	Imperial German Navy	Yorck	Roon-class cruiser		
28 December	Royal Netherlands Navy	Christiaan Cornelis	Torpedo boat	CC	
Unknown	Norway	Irma	Passenger ship		

== Bibliography ==
- Roberts, John (1979). "Great Britain (including Empire Forces)". In Chesneau, Roger & Kolesnik, Eugene M. (eds.). Conway's All the World's Fighting Ships 1860–1905. New York: Mayflower Books. pp. 1–113. ISBN 0-8317-0302-4.
