= List of ship commissionings in 1934 =

The list of ship commissionings in 1934 includes a chronological list of all ships commissioned in 1934.

	Operator	Ship	Flag	Class and type	Pennant	Other notes
30 January	Royal Netherlands Navy	K XVI		K XIV-class submarine		
23 March	Royal Netherlands Navy	K XVIII		K XIV-class submarine		
23 March	Luftwaffe	Krischan		Krischan-class seaplane tender		
3 May	French Navy	Surcouf		Cruiser submarine	N N 3	
4 June	United States Navy	Ranger		Light aircraft carrier	CV-4	
12 November	Reichsmarine	Admiral Scheer		Deutschland-class cruiser		
16 December	Portuguese Navy	NRP Delfim		Delfim-class submarine	D	
