= List of ship decommissionings in 1872 =

The list of ship decommissionings in 1872 includes a chronological list of all ships decommissioned in 1872.

	Operator	Ship	Flag	Class and type	Fate	Other notes
25 June	United States Navy	Mohican		Steam sloop-of-war	Broken up in 1873	

== Bibliography ==
- Silverstone, Paul H. (2006). Civil War Navies 1855–1883. The U.S. Navy Warship Series. New York: Routledge. ISBN 978-0-415-97870-5.
