= List of ship decommissionings in 1876 =

The list of ship decommissionings in 1876 includes a chronological list of all ships decommissioned in 1876.

	Operator	Ship	Flag	Class and type	Fate	Other notes
15 April	United States Navy	Pinta		screw tug	laid up, reactivated 1878	
8 June	United States Navy	Colorado		steam screw frigate	sold	
13 July	United States Navy	Saco		gunboat	sold	
26 July	United States Navy	Congress		Screw sloop	sold	
