= List of ship decommissionings in 1882 =

The list of ship decommissionings in 1882 is a chronological list of ships decommissioned in 1882. In cases where no official decommissioning ceremony was held, the date of withdrawal from service may be used instead. For ships lost at sea, see list of shipwrecks in 1882 instead.

Date	Operator	Ship	Pennant	Class and type	Fate and other notes	Ref
December 12	United States Navy	USS Nantucket		Passaic-class monitor	Placed in reserve; sold for scrap on 14 November 1900	
