= List of ship commissionings in 1873 =

The list of ship commissionings in 1873 includes a chronological list of all ships commissioned in 1873.

Date	Operator	Ship	Pennant	Class and type	Notes
July 17	Imperial Brazilian Navy	Trajano		Cruiser	
October 1	Austro-Hungarian Navy	Frundsberg		Corvette	
October 29	United States Revenue Cutter Service	George S. Boutwell		Revenue cutter	
Unknown	Royal Norwegian Navy	Rap		Torpedo boat	
