= List of ship decommissionings in 2013 =

The list of ship decommissionings in 2013 includes a chronological list of ships decommissioned in 2013.

| | Operator | Ship | Flag | Class and type | Pennant | Fate | Other notes |
|---|---|---|---|---|---|---|---|
| 6 June | Royal Navy | Edinburgh | | Type 42 Destroyer | D97 | Scrapped | |
