= List of ship commissionings in 1959 =

The list of ship commissionings in 1959 includes a chronological list of all ships commissioned in 1959.

	Operator	Ship	Class and type	Pennant	Other notes
10 January	United States Navy	Independence	Forrestal-class aircraft carrier	CVA-62	
27 January	German Navy	Albatros	Seeadler-class fast attack craft	S7	
24 February	German Navy	Kondor	Seeadler-class fast attack craft	S8	
3 March	German Navy	Greif	Seeadler-class fast attack craft	S9	
21 March	German Navy	Bussard	Seeadler-class fast attack craft	S25	
14 April	German Navy	Falke	Seeadler-class fast attack craft	S10	
21 May	German Navy	Habicht	Seeadler-class fast attack craft	S26	
3 June	Rederi Ab Vikinglinjen (Finland)	Viking	Ferry		Ex-Dinard with Southern Railway Co.
3 June	German Navy	Geier	Seeadler-class fast attack craft	S11	
1 July	German Navy	Sperber	Seeadler-class fast attack craft	S27	
8 July	Argentine Navy	Independencia	Colossus-class aircraft carrier	V-1	
15 October	United States Navy	Blueback	Barbel-class submarine	SS-581	
9 November	German Navy	Kormoran	Seeadler-class fast attack craft	S28	
30 December	United States Navy	George Washington	George Washington-class ballistic missile submarine	SSBN-598	First ballistic missile submarine
