= List of ship commissionings in 1864 =

The list of ship commissionings in 1864 is a chronological list of ships commissioned in 1864. In cases where no official commissioning ceremony was held, the date of service entry may be used instead.

Date	Operator	Ship	Pennant	Class and type	Notes
7 April	United States Navy	Saugus	–	Canonicus-class monitor	Commissioned at Philadelphia Navy Yard, Philadelphia,, Pennsylvania, with Commander Edmund R. Colhoun in command
16 April	United States Navy	Canonicus	–	Canonicus-class monitor	Commissioned at Boston, Massachusetts, with Commander E. G. Parrott in command
