= List of ship decommissionings in 1937 =

The list of ship decommissionings in 1937 is a chronological list of ships decommissioned in 1937. In cases where no official decommissioning ceremony was held, the date of withdrawal from service may be used instead. For ships lost at sea, see list of shipwrecks in 1937 instead.

Date	Operator	Ship	Pennant	Class and type	Fate and other notes
1 April	United States Navy	USS Aaron Ward	DD-132	Wickes-class destroyer	Placed in reserve until recommissioned in 1939
11 October	Regia Marina	Aquila		Vifor-class destroyer	Transferred to Spanish Nationalist faction; renamed Melilla
11 October	Regia Marina	Falco		Vifor-class destroyer	Transferred to Spanish Nationalist faction; renamed Ceuta
24 October	Regia Marina	Alessandro Poerio		Alessandro Poerio-class destroyer	Sold to Spanish Nationalist faction; renamed Huesca
24 October	Regia Marina	Guglielmo Pepe		Alessandro Poerio-class destroyer	Sold to Spanish Nationalist faction; renamed Teruel
