= List of ship decommissionings in 1969 =

The list of ship decommissionings in 1969 includes a chronological list of all ships decommissioned in 1969.

Date	Operator	Ship	Class and type	Fate	Other notes
7 January	Sweden, Rederi AB Svea	Svea	Ferry	Sold to Swedish Lloyd as Hispania	
15 January	Finland, Finnlines	Finnpartner	Ferry	Sold to Rederi AB Svea for Trave Line traffic as Sveaborg	
13 February	United States Navy	Randolph	Essex-class aircraft carrier	Scrapped	Reserve until stricken in 1973
30 June	United States Navy	Essex	Essex-class aircraft carrier	Scrapped	Reserve until stricken in 1973
6 October	United States Military Sea Transportation Service	Kula Gulf	Commencement Bay-class aircraft transport	Scrapped	
16 October	United States Military Sea Transportation Service	Point Cruz	Commencement Bay-class aircraft transport	Scrapped	
1 December	United States Navy	Boxer	Essex-class amphibious assault ship	Scrapped	
20 December	United States Navy	Annapolis	Intelligence gathering ship	Scrapped	Reserve until stricken in 1976
Unknown date	Argentine Navy	Independencia	Colossus-class aircraft carrier	Scrapped in 1971	
Unknown date	United States Fish and Wildlife Service	John R. Manning	Fisheries research vessel	Sold	Pennant number FWS 1002; sank as R. B. Hendrickson 13 May 1979

== Bibliography ==
- "Essex IV (CV-9)". Dictionary of American Naval Fighting Ships. Navy Department, Naval History and Heritage Command.
