= List of ship decommissionings in 2000 =

This is a chronological list of ship decommissionings in 2000.

	Operator	Ship	Flag	Class and type	Fate	Other notes
11 February	United States Navy	William H. Bates		Sturgeon-class submarine	Submarine recycling	
15 March	United States Navy	Hawkbill		Sturgeon-class submarine	Submarine recycling	
15 March	United States Navy	Clark		Oliver Hazard Perry-class frigate	Transferred to Poland	Renamed ORP Generał Kazimierz Pułaski
12 May	Royal Australian Navy	Hobart		Perth-class destroyer	Sunk as dive wreck	
15 May	Royal Netherlands Navy	Alkmaar		Alkmaar-class minehunter	Transferred to Latvia	Renamed Rūsiņš
19 June	Royal Netherlands Navy	Delfzijl		Alkmaar-class minehunter	Transferred to Latvia	Renamed Visvaldis
5 July	Royal Netherlands Navy	Dordrecht		Alkmaar-class minehunter	Transferred to Latvia	Renamed Talivaldis (M-06)
16 October	United States Navy	John Hancock		Spruance-class destroyer	Awaiting scrapping	
14 November	United States Navy	John A. Moore		Oliver Hazard Perry-class frigate	Transferred to Turkey	Renamed TCG Gediz (F 495)
15 November	French Navy	Foch		Clemenceau-class aircraft carrier	Transferred to Brazil	Renamed São Paulo (A12)
15 December	United States Navy	Moosbrugger		Spruance-class destroyer	Stored reserve	
