= List of ship decommissionings in 2002 =

The list of ship decommissionings in 2002 includes a chronological list of all ships decommissioned in 2002.

	Operator	Ship	Flag	Class and type	Fate	Other notes
28 February	United States Navy	David R. Ray		Spruance-class destroyer	Stricken and awaiting disposal	
18 March	Royal Navy	Fearless		Fearless-class landing platform dock	Scrapped	
18 March	Royal Navy	Intrepid		Fearless-class landing platform dock	Scrapped	
2 April	United States Navy	Kamehameha		Benjamin Franklin-class submarine	Submarine recycling	
11 April	United States Navy	Samuel Eliot Morison		Oliver Hazard Perry-class frigate	Transferred to Turkey	Renamed TCG Gökova (F 496)
20 June	United States Navy	Inchon		Iwo Jima-class amphibious assault ship	Sunk as a target in 2004	
28 June	United States Navy	Wadsworth		Oliver Hazard Perry-class frigate	Transferred to Poland	Renamed ORP Generał Tadeusz Kościuszko
4 October	United States Navy	Peterson		Spruance-class destroyer	Sunk as a target in 2004	
5 October	United States Navy	Frederick		Newport-class tank landing ship	Transferred to Mexico	Renamed ARM Usumacinta
20 December	United States Navy	Nicholson		Spruance-class destroyer	Sunk as a target in 2004	
