= List of ship decommissionings in 1943 =

The list of ship decommissionings in 1943 is a chronological list of all ships decommissioned in 1943. In cases where no official decommissioning ceremony was held, the date of withdrawal from service may be used instead. For ships lost at sea, see list of shipwrecks in 1943 instead.

	Operator	Ship	Class and type	Fate	Other notes
19 July	United States Navy	Baffins	Bogue-class escort carrier	Lend-Lease transfer to United Kingdom	Renamed HMS Ameer (Royal Navy)
31 July	United States Navy	Glacier	Bogue-class escort carrier	Lend-Lease transfer to United Kingdom	Renamed HMS Atheling (Royal Navy)
6 August	United States Navy	Pybus	Bogue-class escort carrier	Lend-Lease transfer to United Kingdom	Renamed HMS Emperor (Royal Navy)
12 August	United States Navy	Bolinas	Bogue-class escort carrier	Lend-Lease transfer to United Kingdom	Renamed HMS Begum (Royal Navy)
September	Royal Navy	Newmarket	Wickes-class destroyer	Reduced to care and maintenance status	
6 November	Royal Navy	Archer	Long Island-class escort carrier	reduced to care and maintenance	Transferred to Ministry of War Transport in 1945 and renamed Empire Lagan
23 November	Spanish Navy	Kanguro	Submarine rescue ship	Scrapped 1946	

== Bibliography ==
- Silverstone, Paul H. (2008). The Navy of World War II, 1922-1947. The U.S. Navy Warship Series. New York: Routledge. ISBN 978-0-415-97898-9.
