= List of ship commissionings in 1955 =

The list of ship commissionings in 1955 includes a chronological list of ships commissioned in 1955. In cases where no official commissioning ceremony was held, the date of service entry may be used instead.

Date	Operator	Ship	Class and type	Notes
January 24	Royal Danish Navy	Aarøsund (M571)	Adjutant-class minesweeper	Ex-AMS-127, also maintained on the United States Navy Register until 1981
February 1	United States Navy	Shangri-La (CVA-38)	Essex-class aircraft carrier	Recommissioned from reserve
February 17	United States Navy	Lexington (CVA-16)	Essex-class aircraft carrier	Recommissioned from reserve
October 1	United States Navy	Forrestal (CVA-59)	Forrestal-class aircraft carrier	
October 28	Royal Australian Navy	Melbourne (R21)	Majestic-class aircraft carrier	Ex-HMS Majestic
