= List of ship commissionings in 1928 =

The list of ship commissionings in 1928 is a chronological list of ships commissioned in 1928. In cases where no official commissioning ceremony was held, the date of service entry may be used instead.

| Date | Operator | Ship | Class and type | Notes | Ref |
|---|---|---|---|---|---|
| March (unknown date) | United States Navy | Abel P. Upshur | Clemson-class destroyer | recommissioned from reserve as a training ship | |
| 12 April | Royal Netherlands Navy | Evertsen | Admiralen-class destroyer | | |
| 31 May | Royal Netherlands Navy | Van Ghent | Admiralen-class destroyer | | |
| 18 July | Spanish Navy | C-1 | C-class submarine | Renamed Isaac Peral 1930 | |
| 19 July | Spanish Navy | C-2 | C-class submarine | | |
| 21 December | Royal Australian Navy | Albatross | seaplane tender | | |
