= List of ship commissionings in 1992 =

The list of ship commissionings in 1992 includes a chronological list of all ships commissioned in 1992.

	Operator	Ship	Flag	Class and type	Pennant	Other notes
15 February	Royal Australian Navy	Melbourne		Adelaide-class frigate	FFG 05	
2 May	United States Navy	Anzio		Ticonderoga-class cruiser	CG-68	
9 May	United States Navy	Ashland		Whidbey Island-class dock landing ship	LSD-48	
June	People's Liberation Army Navy	Zhanjiang		Type 051 destroyer	165	Date of initial operational capability
4 July	United States Navy	George Washington		Nimitz-class aircraft carrier	CVN-73	
18 July	United States Navy	Shiloh		Ticonderoga-class cruiser	CG-67	
17 October	United States Navy	Essex		Wasp-class amphibious assault ship	LHD-2	
14 November	United States Navy	Vicksburg		Ticonderoga-class cruiser	CG-69	
21 November	Islamic Republic of Iran Navy	Taregh		Kilo-class submarine	901	
12 December	United States Navy	Barry		Arleigh Burke-class destroyer	DDG-52	
