= List of ship commissionings in 2016 =

The list of ship commissionings in 2016 includes a chronological list of all ships commissioned in 2016.

	Operator	Ship	Flag	Class and type	Pennant	Other notes
13 September	(Iran) Navy of the Islamic Revolutionary Guard Corps	Shahid Nazeri		Catamaran vessel		
