= List of ship decommissionings in 2020 =

The list of ship decommissionings in 2020 includes a chronological list of ships decommissioned in 2020.

	Operator	Ship	Class and type	Fate	Other notes
24 January	Indonesian Navy	Tanjung Nusanive	Troopship		Former passenger ferry
19 March	Japan Maritime Self-Defense Force	Yamayuki	Hatsuyuki-class destroyer		
16 November	Japan Maritime Self-Defense Force	Asayuki	Hatsuyuki-class destroyer		
