= List of ship commissionings in 1927 =

The list of ship commissionings in 1927 is a chronological list of ships commissioned in 1927. In cases where no official commissioning ceremony was held, the date of service entry may be used instead.

	Operator	Ship	Flag	Class and type	Pennant	Other notes
27 March	Imperial Japanese Navy	Akagi		Aircraft carrier		
May	French Navy	Béarn		Aircraft carrier		
1 July	Norway	Sanct Svithun		Hurtigruten passenger ship		
12 July	Royal Navy	Berwick		County-class cruiser		
15 August	Royal Navy	Nelson		Nelson-class battleship		
24 August	Royal Navy	Oberon		Odin-class submarine		
20 September	Imperial Japanese Navy	Aoba		Aoba-class cruiser		
20 September	Spanish Navy	Príncipe Alfonso		Almirante Cervera-class light cruiser		
30 September	Imperial Japanese Navy	Kinugasa		Aoba-class cruiser		
10 November	Royal Navy	Rodney		Nelson-class battleship		
16 November	United States Navy	Saratoga		Lexington-class aircraft carrier	CV-3	
14 December	United States Navy	Lexington		Lexington-class aircraft carrier	CV-2	
