= List of ship decommissionings in 2021 =

The list of ship decommissionings in 2021 includes a chronological list of ships decommissioned in 2021.

	Operator	Ship	Class and type	Fate	Other notes
9 March	United States Navy	Louisville	Los Angeles-class submarine		
27 March	United States Navy	Fort McHenry	Whidbey Island-class dock landing ship		
15 April	United States Navy	Bonhomme Richard	Wasp-class amphibious assault ship		
21 May	United States Navy	Bremerton	Los Angeles-class submarine		
1 July	French Navy	Var	Durance-class tanker		
29 July	United States Navy	Independence	Independence-class littoral combat ship		
4 August	Royal Navy	Blyth	Sandown-class minehunter		
4 August	Royal Navy	Ramsey	Sandown-class minehunter		
29 September	United States Navy	Freedom	Freedom-class littoral combat ship		
16 November	United States Navy	Jacksonville	Los Angeles-class submarine		
