= List of ship commissionings in 1870 =

The list of ship commissionings in 1870 is a chronological list of ships commissioned in 1870. In cases where no official commissioning ceremony was held, the date of service entry may be used instead.

	Operator	Ship	Class and type	Pennant	Other notes
4 March	United States Navy	USS Congress	Sloop		
13 March	Colony of Victoria	HMVS Cerberus	Cerberus-class breastwork monitor		
April	Royal Navy	HMS Captain	Turret ship		
28 September	Royal Navy	HMS Vanguard	Audacious-class battleship		
1 October	Royal Navy	HMS Invincible	Audacious-class battleship		
