= List of ship commissionings in 1892 =

The list of ship commissionings in 1892 is a chronological list of ships commissioned in 1892. In cases where no official commissioning ceremony was held, the date of service entry may be used instead.

Date	Operator	Ship	Flag	Class and type	Pennant	Other notes
31 May	Royal Navy	HMS Royal Sovereign		Royal Sovereign-class battleship	–	

== Bibliography ==
- Roberts, John (1979). "Great Britain (including Empire Forces)". In Chesneau, Roger & Kolesnik, Eugene M. (eds.). Conway's All the World's Fighting Ships 1860–1905. New York: Mayflower Books. pp. 1–113. ISBN 0-8317-0302-4.
