= List of ship decommissionings in 1962 =

The list of ship decommissionings in 1962 includes a chronological list of all ships decommissioned in 1962.

	Operator	Ship	Flag	Class and type	Fate	Other notes	Reference(s)
9. February	U.S. Navy	USS Brown	United States	Destroyer	Transferred to the government of Greece following decommission.		
1. August	U.S. Navy	USS Loeser	United States	Destroyer escort	Became Naval reserve ship, retired from naval use on 23. August 1968.		
November	Southern Railway Co	Brittany	United Kingdom	Ferry	Laid up; sold to Rederi Ab Ålandsfärjan in April 1963	Renamed Ålandsfärjan	
