= List of ship commissionings in 1973 =

The list of ship commissionings in 1973 includes a chronological list of all ships commissioned in 1973.

	Operator	Ship	Class and type	Pennant	Other notes
13 February	United States Navy	Jesse L. Brown	Frigate	Knox-class frigate	
13 March	Finland, Finnlines	Finnpartner	Ferry		Formerly Stena Atlantica with Stena Line
31 March	United States Navy	Ainsworth	Frigate	Knox-class frigate	
17 June	Finland, Rederi Ab Sally	Viking 4	Ferry		For Viking Line traffic
30 June	Finland, SF Line	Aurella	Ferry		For Viking Line traffic
15 September	Soviet Union	Marshal Voroshilov	Project 1134A Berkut A large anti-submarine ship		
17 November	United States Navy	Capodanno	Frigate	Knox-class frigate	
28 December	Soviet Union	Admiral Oktyabrsky	Project 1134A Berkut A large anti-submarine ship		
