= List of ship commissionings in 1882 =

The list of ship commissionings in 1882 is a chronological list of ships commissioned in 1882. In cases where no official commissioning ceremony was held, the date of service entry may be used instead.

Date	Operator	Ship	Pennant	Class and type	Notes
29 July	United States Navy	USS Nantucket	–	Passaic-class monitor	Recommissioned from reserve
Unknown date	Spanish Navy	Navarra	–	Aragon-class unprotected cruiser	
