= List of shipwrecks in 1888 =

The list of shipwrecks in 1888 includes ships sunk, foundered, grounded, or otherwise lost during 1888.

table of contents
1888
Jan	Feb	Mar	Apr
May	Jun	Jul	Aug
Sep	Oct	Nov	Dec
Unknown date

== Unknown date ==
List of shipwrecks: Unknown date 1888
Ship	State	Description
Andrew H. Edwards	Flag unknown	The barque was lost off Island Beach on the coast of New Jersey, United States.
Anna Delius	Norway	The barque was abandoned in the North Atlantic. Her crew were rescued by the steamship Deutschland (Germany) and were later transferred to Pieter de Coninck (Belgium), which landed them at Boston, Massachusetts, United States.
Ann Millicent	United Kingdom	The barque was wrecked on the Timore Rocks, in the Pacific Ocean. Her fifteen crew survived.
Civitas Carrera	Flag unknown	The barque was lost at Manasquan, New Jersey. Her wreck was buried until a storm uncovered it and it was salvaged in 1937.
Star of Greece	United Kingdom	The full-rigged ship was wrecked off Port Willunga, South Australia with the loss of seventeen lives.
Theodore Ducos	France	The barque caught fire at Tahiti on June 18 or July 18 and was scuttled.
Weathersfield	United Kingdom	The vessel was lost in the Cook Strait, New Zealand. The captain and two of the crew were landed at Plymouth in March 1889.
