= Spanish ship Vencedora =

Two ships of the Spanish Navy (Armada Española) have been named Vencedora, Spanish for "Victorious":

- Vencedora (1861), a Narváez-class screw corvette in commission from 1862 to 1888.
- Vencedora (F36), a Descubierta-class corvette commissioned in 1982, converted into a patrol craft (P79) in 2000, and decommissioned on 1 January 2017.
