= List of Wickes-class destroyers =

List of Wickes-class destroyers.

== Ships in class ==
=== USS Wickes (HMS Montgomery) ===
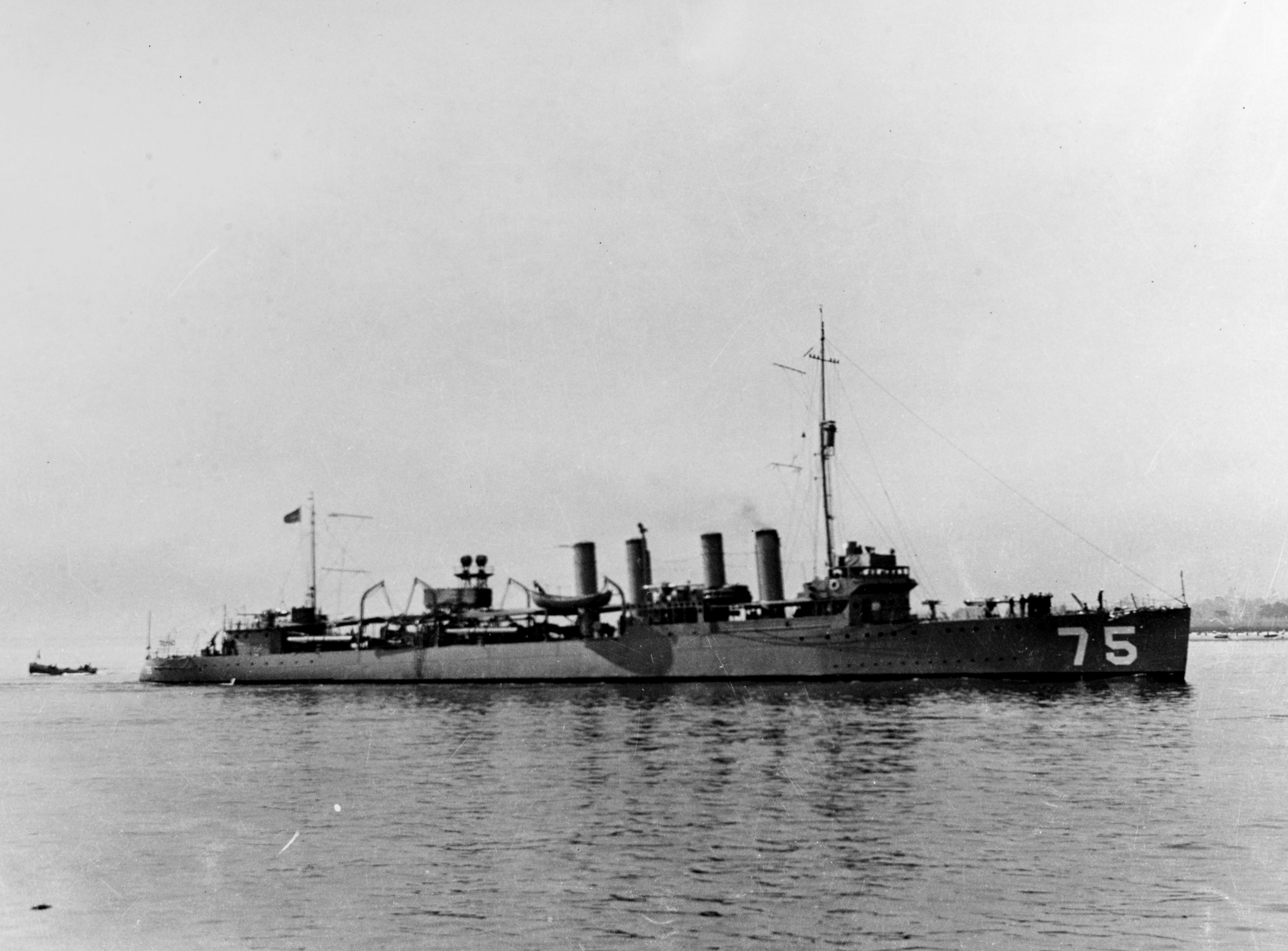
USS Wickes

- Designation: Destroyer No. 75, DD-75, G95
- Builders: United States (Bath Iron Works in Bath, Maine)
- Laid down: 26 June 1917
- Launched: 25 June 1918 (List)
- Operator: United States Navy
- Commissioned: 31 July 1918 (List)
- Decommissioned: 23 October 1940 (List)
- Operator: Royal Navy
- Commissioned: 23 October 1940 (List)
- Decommissioned: 23 February 1944 (List)
- Fate: Scrapped in the spring of 1945
- Operations: World War I and II convoy escort
- Victories:

=== USS Philip (HMS Lancaster) ===
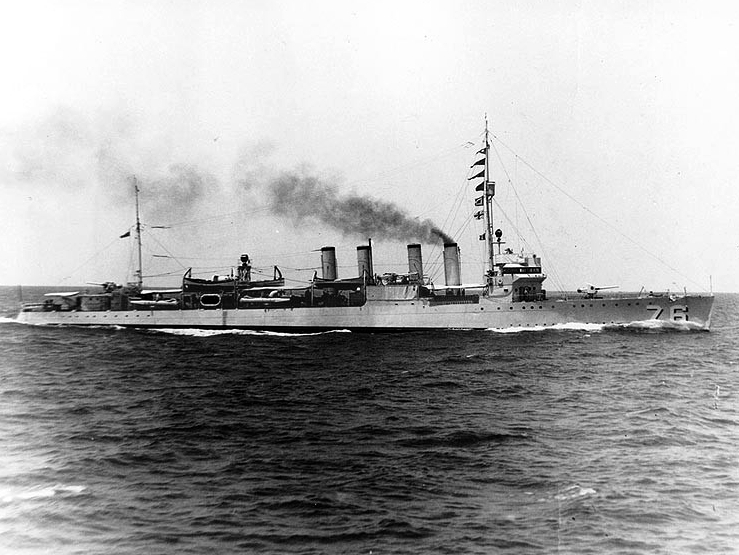
USS Philip

- Designation: Destroyer No. 76, DD-76, G05
- Builders: United States (Bath Iron Works in Bath, Maine)
- Laid down: 1 September 1917
- Launched: 25 July 1918 (List)
- Operator: United States Navy
- Commissioned: 24 August 1918 (List)
- Decommissioned: 23 October 1940 (List)
- Operator: Royal Navy
- Commissioned: 23 October 1940 (List)
- Decommissioned: July 1945 (List)
- Fate: Scrapped 1947
- Operations: World War I convoy escort, World War II minelayer and escort

=== USS Woolsey ===
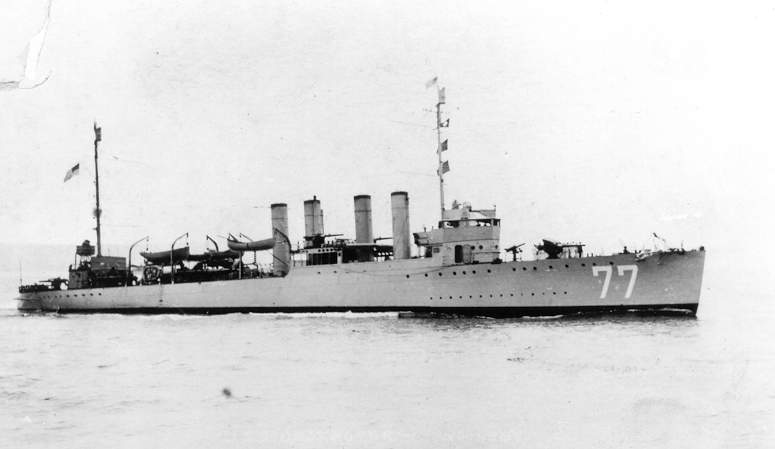
USS Woolsey

- Designation: Destroyer No. 77, DD-77
- Builders: United States (Bath Iron Works in Bath, Maine)
- Laid down: 1 November 1917
- Launched: 17 September 1918 (List)
- Operator: United States Navy
- Commissioned: 30 September 1918 (List)
- Fate: Sunk in a collision 21 February 1921 (List)
- Operations: World War I convoy escort

=== USS Evans (HMS Mansfield) ===
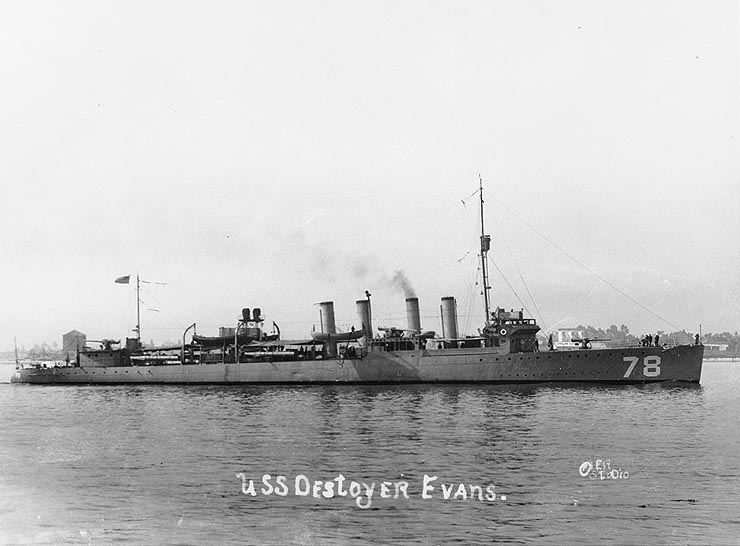
USS Evans

- Designation: Destroyer No. 78, DD-78
- Builders: United States (Bath Iron Works in Bath, Maine)
- Laid down: 28 December 1917
- Launched: 30 October 1918 (List)
- Operator: United States Navy
- Commissioned: 11 October 1918 (List)
- Decommissioned: 23 October 1940 (List)
- Operator: Royal Navy, Royal Norwegian Navy, Royal Canadian Navy
- Commissioned: 23 October 1940 (List)
- Decommissioned: 22 June 1944 (List)
- Fate: Scrapped 1945
- Operations: World War I patrol, World War II convoy escort, Norwegian coastal raids
- Victories:

=== USS Little ===
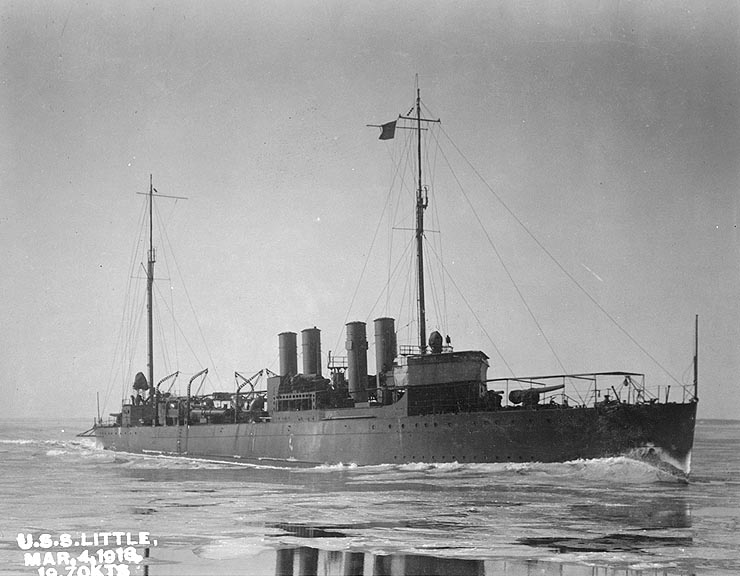
USS Little

- Designation: Destroyer No. 79, DD-79, APD-4
- Builders: United States (Fore River Shipbuilding in Quincy, Massachusetts)
- Laid down: 18 June 1917
- Launched: 11 November 1917 (List)
- Operator: United States Navy
- Commissioned: 6 April 1918 (List)
- Fate: Sunk by Japanese destroyers near Savo Island on 5 September 1942 (List)
- Operations: World War I patrol, World War II convoy escort, Norwegian coastal raids
- Modifications: Conversion to high-speed transport in 1940

=== USS Kimberly ===
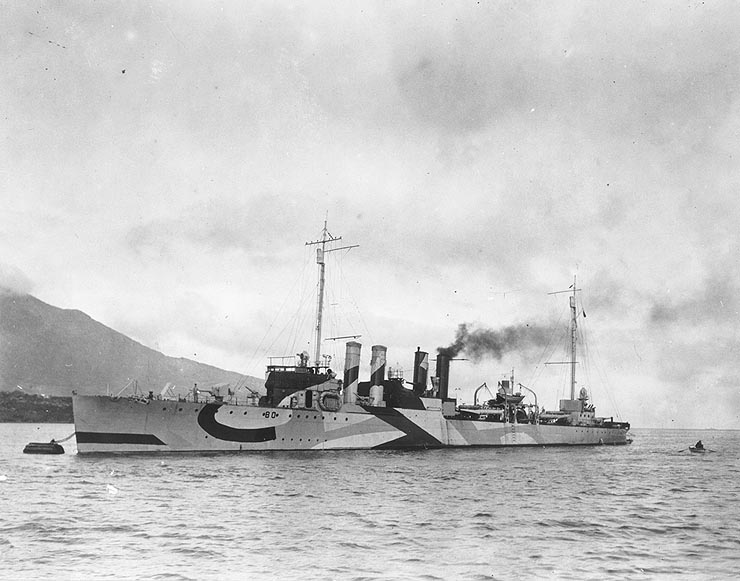
USS Kimberly

- Designation: Destroyer No. 80, DD-80
- Builders: United States (Fore River Shipbuilding in Quincy, Massachusetts)
- Laid down:
- Launched: 14 December 1917 (List)
- Operator: United States Navy
- Commissioned: 26 April 1918 (List)
- Decommissioned: 30 June 1922 (List)
- Fate: Sold for scrap 20 April 1939
- Operations: World War I convoy escort

=== USS Sigourney (HMS Newport) ===
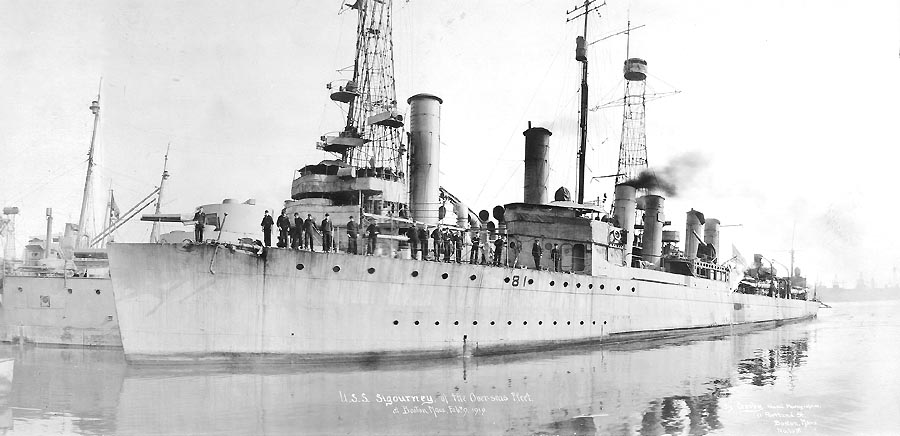
USS Sigourney

- Designation: Destroyer No. 81, DD-81
- Builders: United States (Fore River Shipbuilding in Quincy, Massachusetts)
- Laid down: 25 August 1917
- Launched: 16 December 1917 (List)
- Operator: United States Navy
- Commissioned: 15 May 1918 (List)
- Decommissioned: 26 November 1940 (List)
- Operator: Royal Navy, Royal Norwegian Navy
- Commissioned: 5 December 1940 (List)
- Decommissioned: January 1945 (List)
- Fate: Scrapped 26 June 1947
- Operations: World War I convoy escort, World War II convoy escort and target ship

=== USS Gregory ===
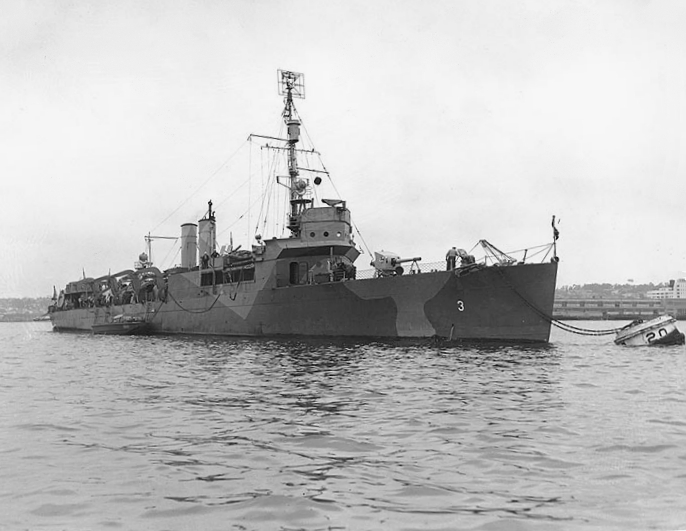
In port 1942

- Designation: Destroyer No. 82, DD-82, APD-3
- Builders: United States (Fore River Shipbuilding in Quincy, Massachusetts)
- Laid down: 25 August 1917
- Launched: 27 January 1918 (List)
- Operator: United States Navy
- Commissioned: 1 June 1918 (List)
- Fate: Sunk near Guadalcanal 5 September 1942 (List)
- Operations: World War I convoy escort, World War II fast transport

=== USS Stringham ===
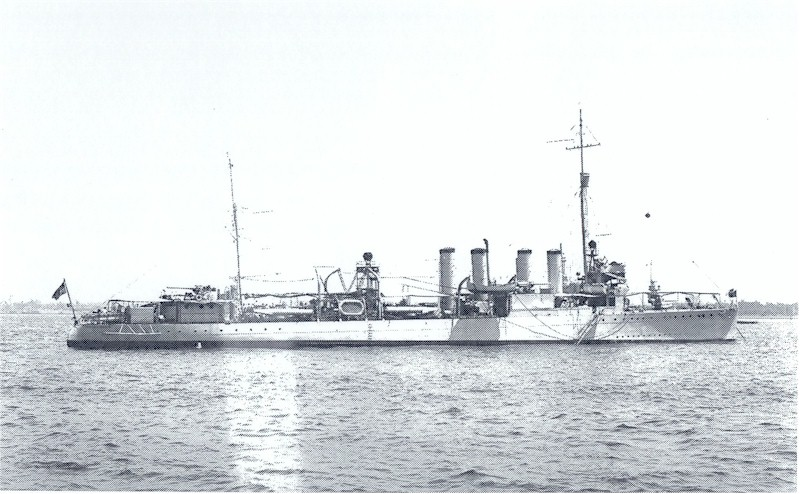

- Designation: Destroyer No. 83, DD-83, APD-6
- Builders: United States (Fore River Shipbuilding in Quincy, Massachusetts)
- Laid down: 19 September 1917
- Launched: 30 March 1918 (List)
- Operator: United States Navy
- Commissioned: 2 July 1918 (List)
- Decommissioned: 9 November 1945 (List)
- Fate: Scrapped March 1946
- Operations: World War I convoy escort, World War II fast transport

=== USS Dyer ===
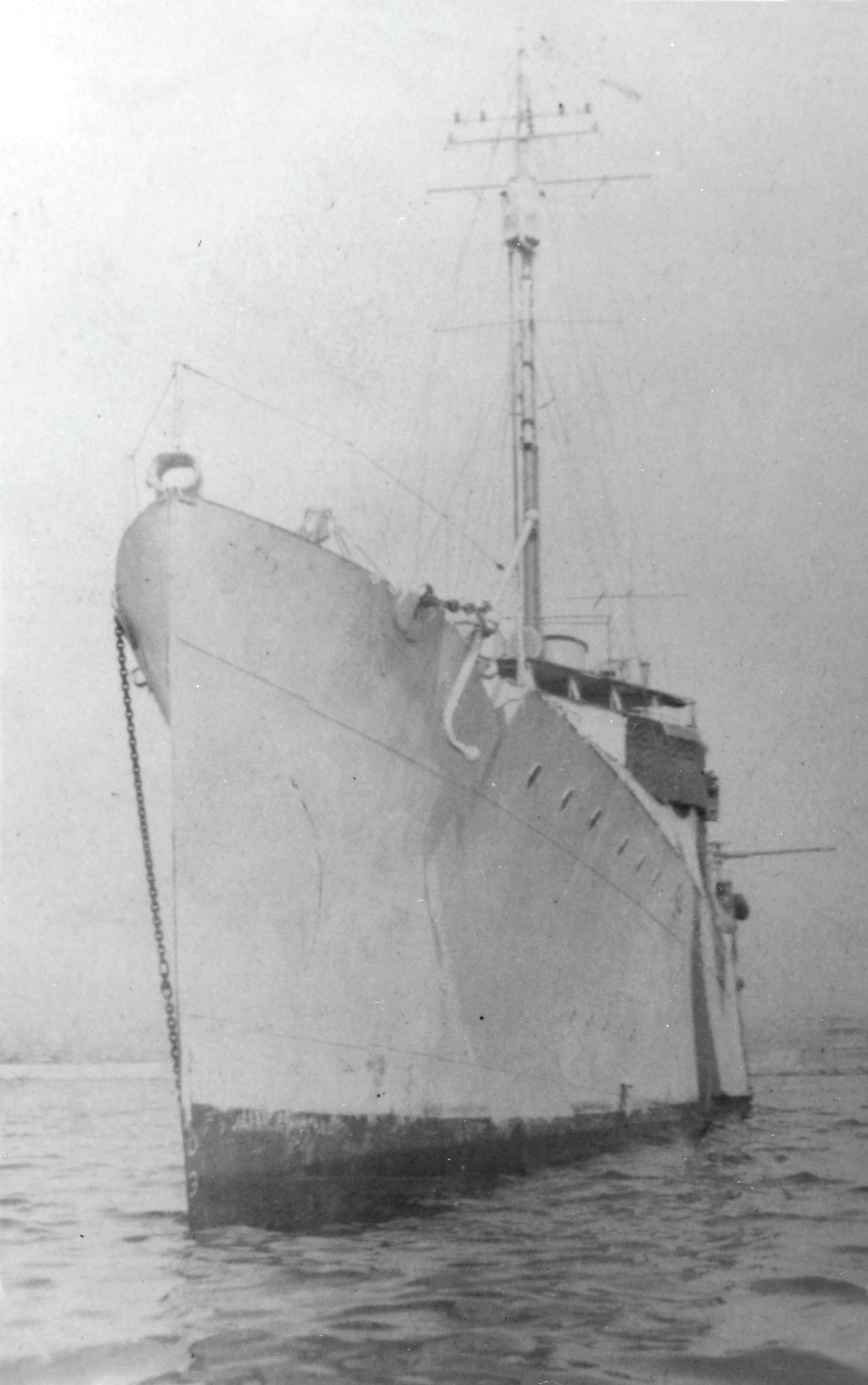

- Designation: Destroyer No. 84, DD-84
- Builders: United States (Fore River Shipbuilding in Quincy, Massachusetts)
- Laid down: 26 September 1917
- Launched: 13 April 1918 (List)
- Operator: United States Navy
- Commissioned: 1 July 1918 (List)
- Decommissioned: 7 June 1922 (List)
- Fate: Sold for scrap 8 September 1936
- Operations: World War I convoy escort, VIP transport

=== USS Colhoun ===
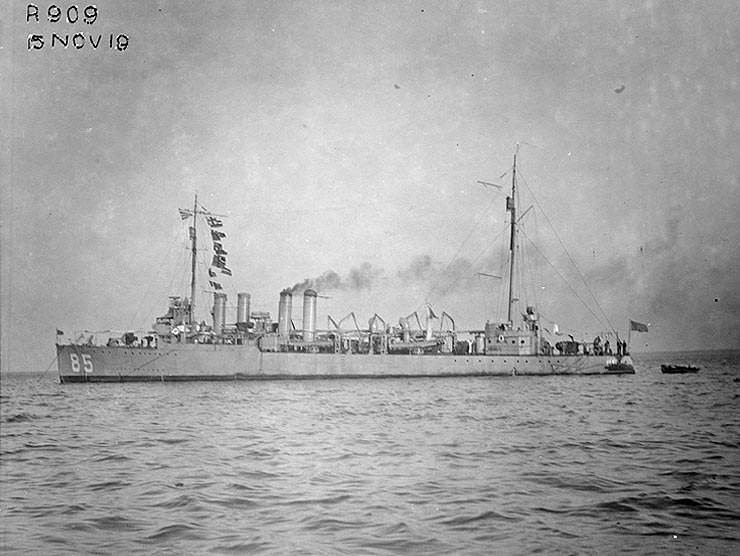

- Designation: Destroyer No. 85, DD-85, APD-2
- Builders: United States (Fore River Shipbuilding in Quincy, Massachusetts)
- Laid down: 19 September 1917
- Launched: 21 February 1918 (List)
- Operator: United States Navy
- Commissioned: 13 June 1918 (List)
- Fate: Sunk near Guadalcanal on 30 August 1942 (List)
- Operations: World War I convoy escort, Guadalcanal high speed transport

=== USS Stevens ===
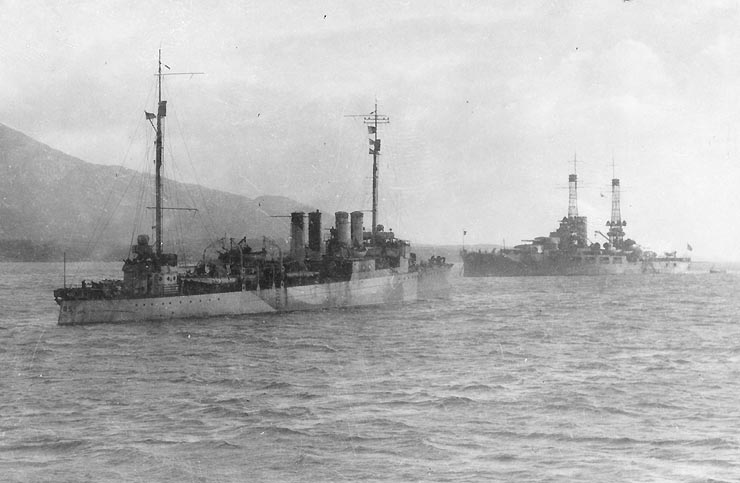

- Designation: Destroyer No. 86, DD-86
- Builders: United States (Fore River Shipbuilding in Quincy, Massachusetts)
- Laid down: 20 September 1917
- Launched: 13 January 1918 (List)
- Operator: United States Navy
- Commissioned: 24 May 1918 (List)
- Decommissioned: 19 June 1922 (List)
- Fate: Sold for scrap 8 September 1936
- Operations: World War I convoy escort

=== USS McKee ===
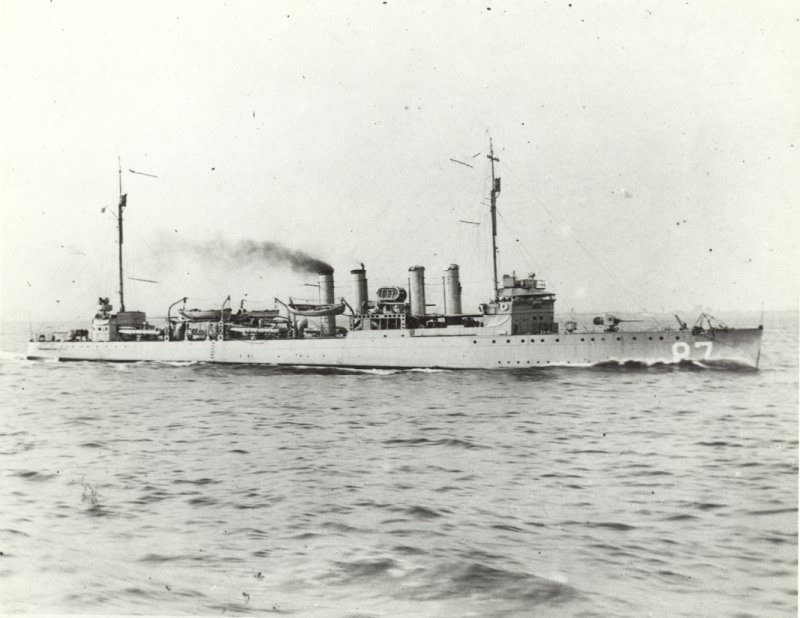

- Designation: Destroyer No. 87, DD-87
- Builders: United States (Union Iron Works in San Francisco, California)
- Laid down: 29 October 1917
- Launched: 23 March 1918 (List)
- Operator: United States Navy
- Commissioned: 7 September 1918 (List)
- Decommissioned: 16 June 1922 (List)
- Fate: Sold for scrap 7 January 1936
- Operations: World War I convoy escort

=== USS Robinson (HMS Newmarket) ===
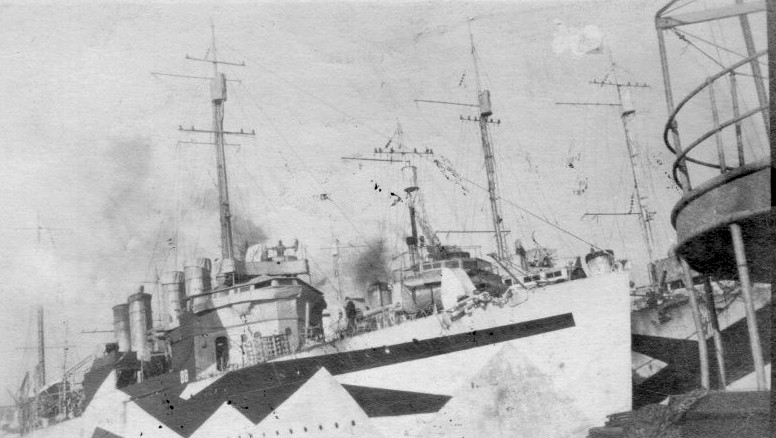

- Designation: Destroyer No. 88, DD-88
- Builders: United States (Union Iron Works in San Francisco, California)
- Laid down: 31 October 1917
- Launched: 28 March 1918 (List)
- Operator: United States Navy
- Commissioned: 19 October 1918 (List)
- Decommissioned: 3 August 1922 (List)
- Operator: Royal Navy (as HMS Newmarket)
- Commissioned: 5 December 1940 (List)
- Decommissioned:
- Fate: Scrapped in September 1945
- Operations: World War I convoy escort, Transatlantic flight plane guard, World War II convoy escort and aircraft target ship

=== USS Ringgold (HMS Newark) ===
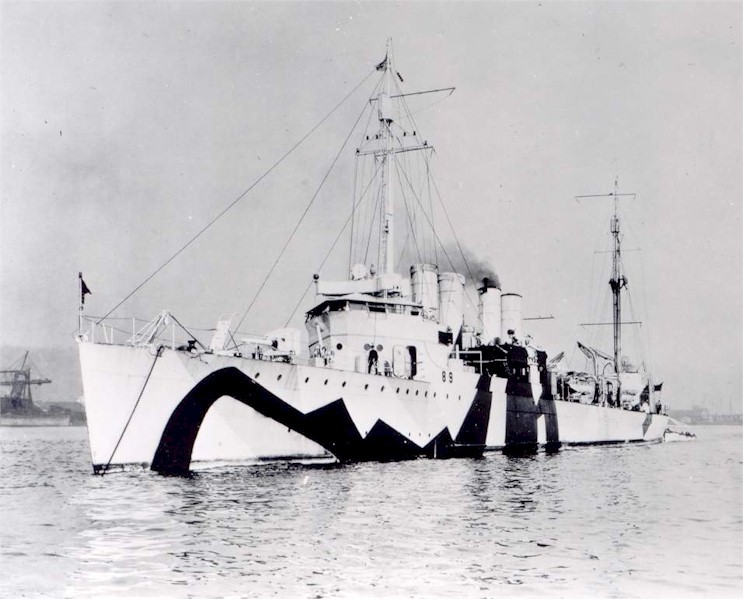

- Designation: Destroyer No. 89, DD-89
- Builders: United States (Union Iron Works in San Francisco, California)
- Laid down: 20 October 1917
- Launched: 14 April 1918 (List)
- Operator: United States Navy
- Commissioned: 14 November 1918 (List)
- Decommissioned: 17 June 1922 (List)
- Operator: Royal Navy (as HMS Newark)
- Commissioned: 26 November 1940 (List)
- Decommissioned:
- Fate: Scrapped on 18 February 1947, Bo'ness, Scotland
- Operations: World War I convoy escort, World War II convoy escort and aircraft target ship
- Victories: Damaged one German submarine

=== USS McKean ===
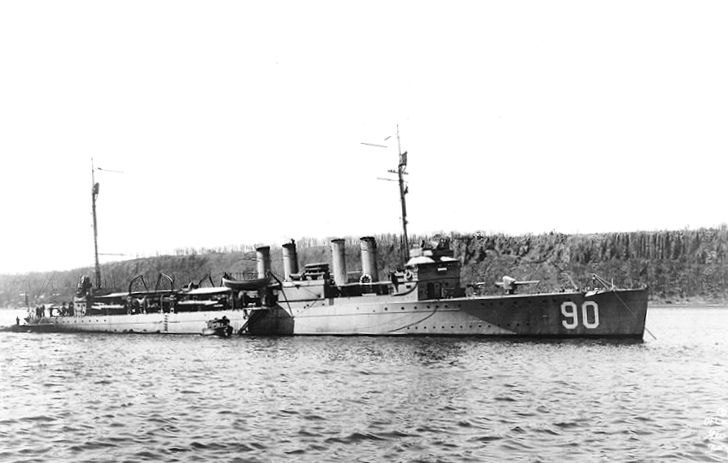

- Designation: Destroyer No. 90, DD-90, APD-5
- Builders: United States (Union Iron Works in San Francisco, California)
- Laid down: 12 February 1918
- Launched: 4 July 1918 (List)
- Operator: United States Navy
- Commissioned: 25 February 1919 (List)
- Fate: Sunk near Bougainville on 17 November 1943 (List)
- Operations: World War I convoy escort, Guadalcanal high speed transport

=== USS Harding ===
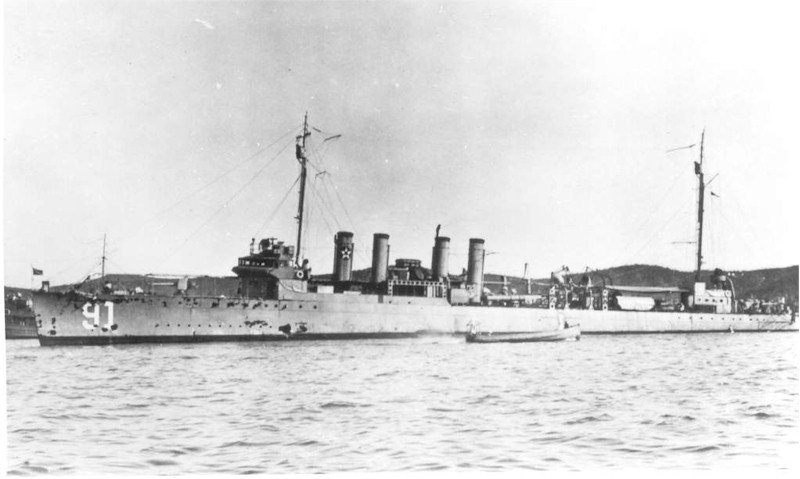

- Designation: Destroyer No. 91, DD-91
- Builders: United States (Union Iron Works in San Francisco, California)
- Laid down: 12 February 1918
- Launched: 4 July 1918 (List)
- Operator: United States Navy
- Commissioned: 24 January 1919 (List)
- Decommissioned: 1 July 1922 (List)
- Fate: Sold for scrap 8 September 1936
- Operations: World War I convoy escort

=== USS Gridley ===
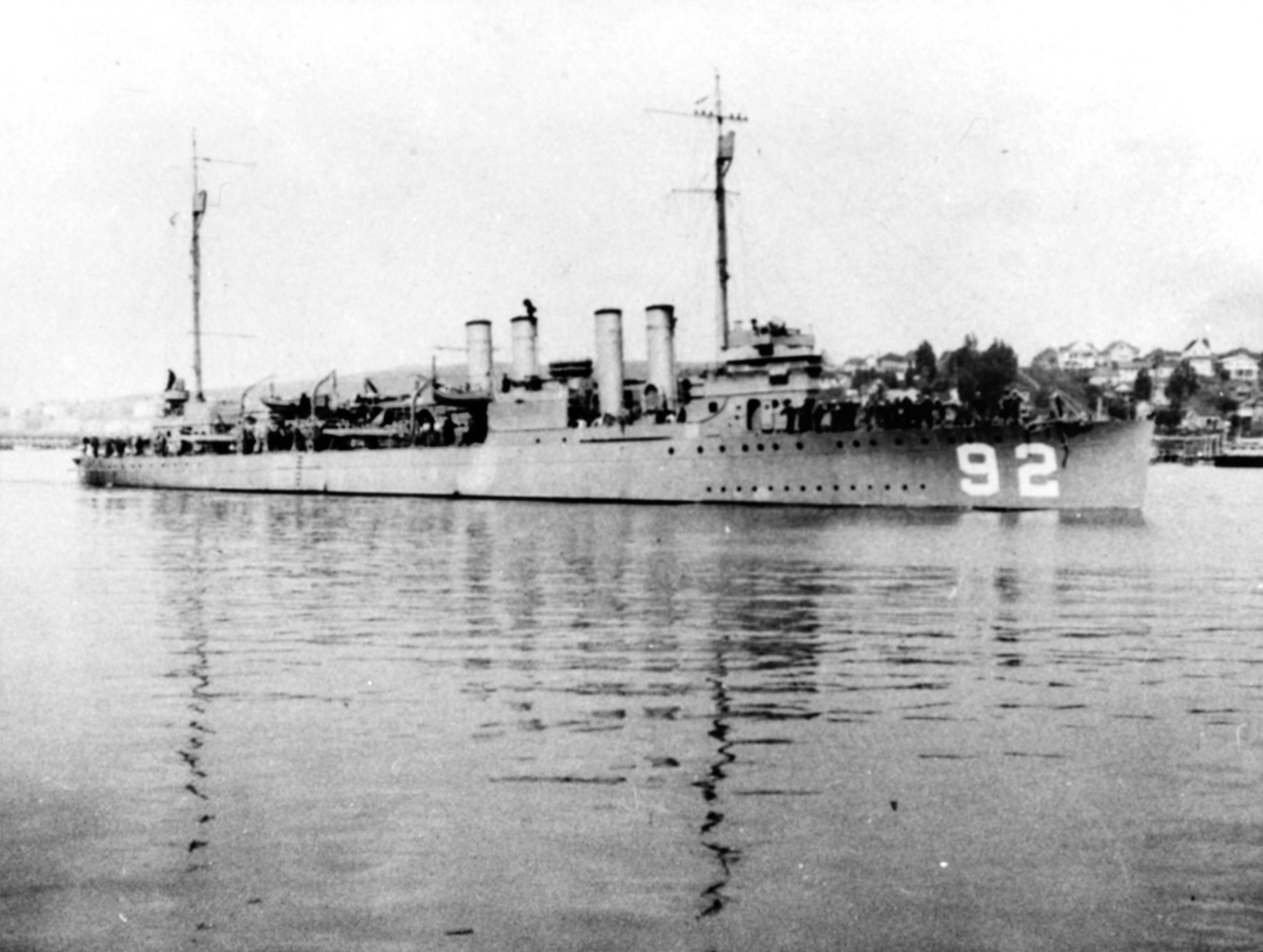

- Designation: Destroyer No. 92, DD-92
- Builders: United States (Union Iron Works in San Francisco, California)
- Laid down: 1 April 1918
- Launched: 4 July 1918 (List)
- Operator: United States Navy
- Commissioned: 8 March 1919 (List)
- Decommissioned: 22 June 1922 (List)
- Fate: Sold for scrap 19 April 1939
- Operations: World War I convoy escort

=== USS Fairfax (HMS Richmond) — (later Soviet Zhivuchiy "Tenacious"). ===
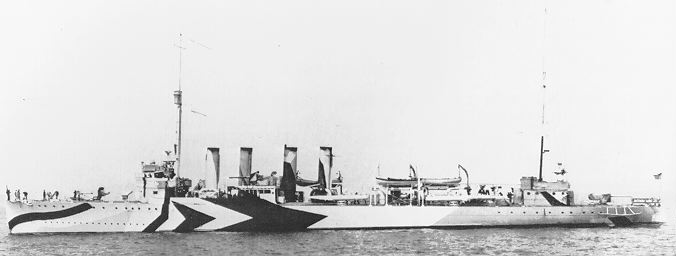

- Designation: Destroyer No. 93, DD-93
- Builders: United States (Mare Island Navy Yard in Vallejo, California)
- Laid down: 10 July 1917
- Launched: 15 December 1917 (List)
- Operator: United States Navy (as USS Fairfax)
- Commissioned: 6 April 1918 (List)
- Decommissioned: 26 November 1940 (List)
- Operator: Royal Navy and Royal Canadian Navy (as HMS Richmond)
- Commissioned: 5 December 1940 (List)
- Decommissioned: 16 July 1944 (List)
- Operator: Soviet Navy (as ''Zhivuchiy ("Tenacious").
- Commissioned: 16 July 1944 (List)
- Fate: Scrapped 1949
- Operations: World War I convoy escort, World War II Arctic and Atlantic convoy escort

=== USS Taylor ===
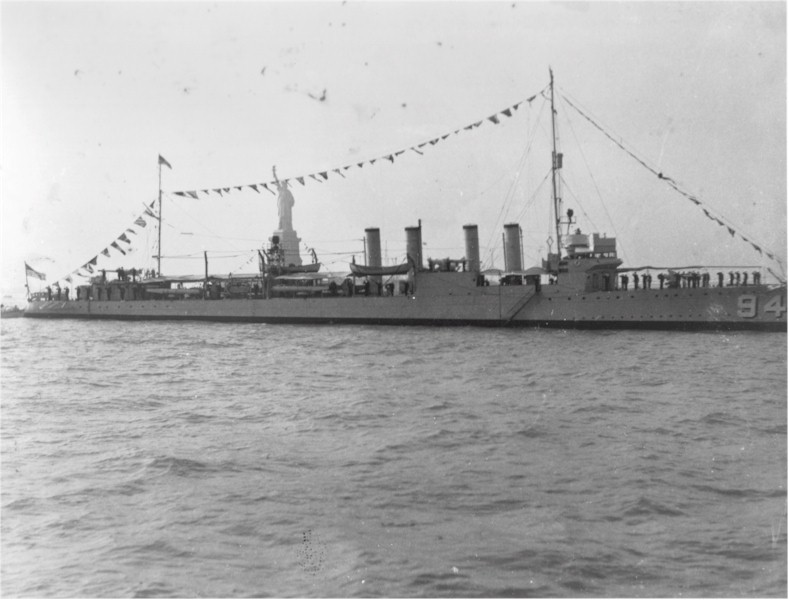

- Designation: Destroyer No. 94, DD-94, Damage Control Hulk No. 40
- Builders: United States (Mare Island Navy Yard in Vallejo, California)
- Laid down: 15 October 1917
- Launched: 14 February 1918 (List)
- Operator: United States Navy
- Commissioned: 1 June 1918 (List)
- Decommissioned: 23 September 1938 (List)
- Fate: Sold for scrap 8 August 1945
- Operations: World War I convoy escort, Special Service Squadron, World War II damage control hulk

=== USS Bell ===
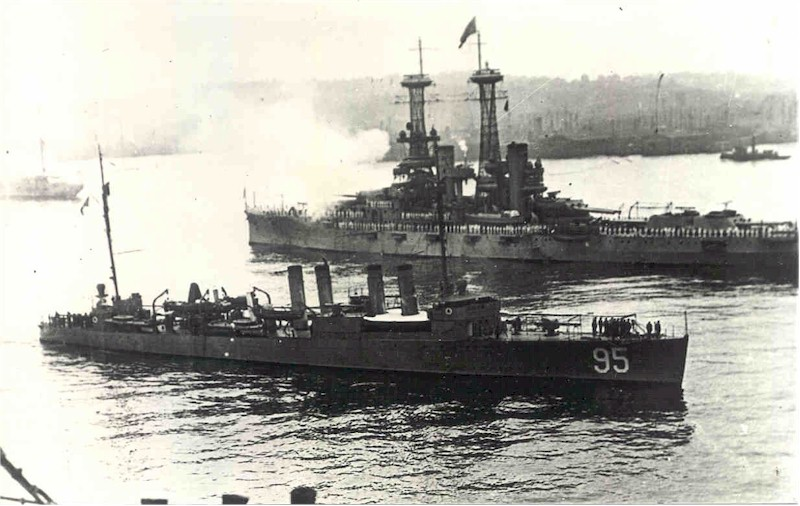

- Designation: Destroyer No. 95, DD-95
- Builders: United States (Bethlehem Shipbuilding Corporation's Fore River Shipyard, Quincy, Massachusetts)
- Laid down: 16 November 1917
- Launched: 20 April 1918 (List)
- Operator: United States Navy
- Commissioned: 31 July 1918 (List)
- Decommissioned: 21 June 1922 (List)
- Fate: Sold for scrap
- Operations: World War I escort

=== USS Stribling ===
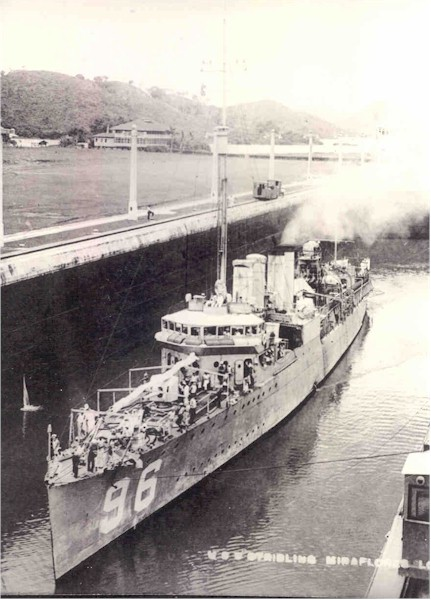

- Designation: Destroyer No. 96, DD-96, DM-1
- Builders: United States (Fore River Shipbuilding in Quincy, Massachusetts)
- Laid down: 14 December 1917
- Launched: 29 May 1918 (List)
- Operator: United States Navy
- Commissioned: 16 August 1918 (List)
- Decommissioned: 26 June 1922 (List)
- Fate: Sunk as a target
- Operations: World War I escort, conversion to a destroyer minelayer

=== USS Murray ===
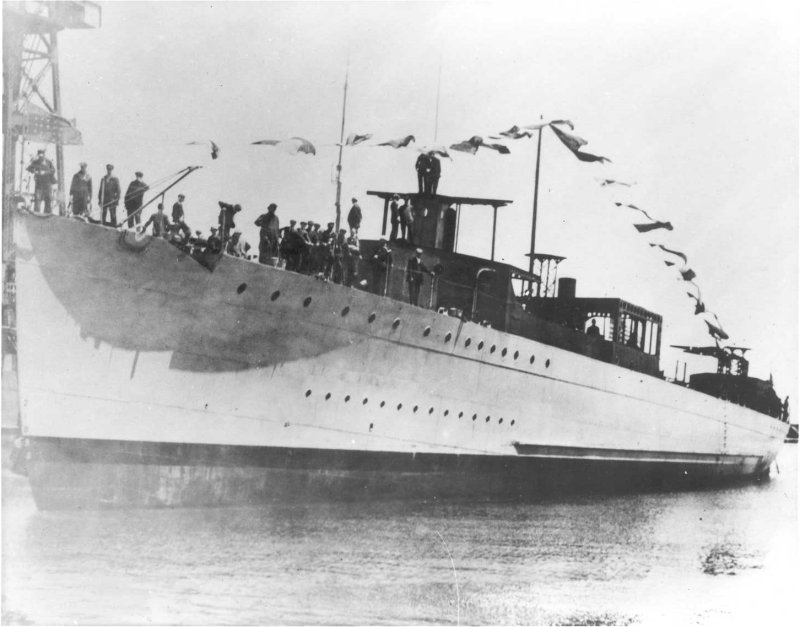

- Designation: Destroyer No. 97, DD-97, DM-2
- Builders: United States (Fore River Shipbuilding in Quincy, Massachusetts)
- Laid down: 22 December 1917
- Launched: 8 June 1918 (List)
- Operator: United States Navy
- Commissioned: 21 August 1918 (List)
- Decommissioned: 1 July 1922 (List)
- Fate: Sold for scrap 29 September 1936
- Operations: World War I escort, conversion to a destroyer minelayer

=== USS Israel ===
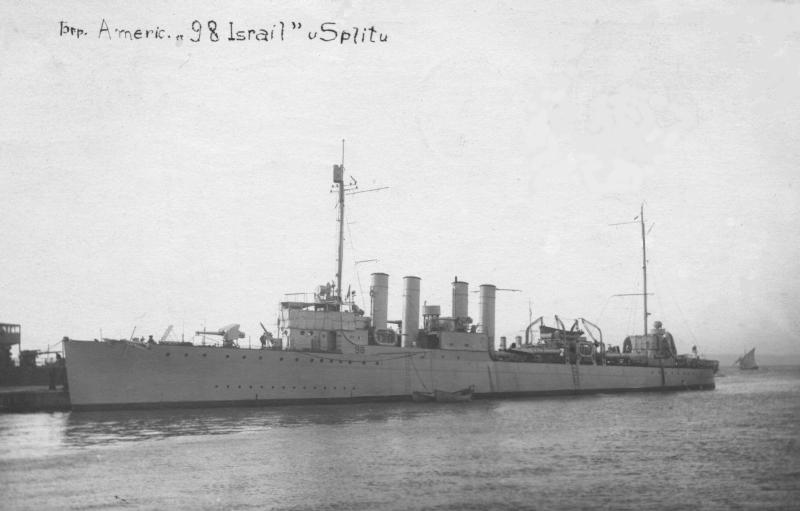

- Designation: Destroyer No. 98, DD-98, DM-3
- Builders: United States (Fore River Shipbuilding in Quincy, Massachusetts)
- Laid down: 26 January 1918
- Launched: 22 June 1918 (List)
- Operator: United States Navy
- Commissioned: 13 September 1918 (List)
- Decommissioned: 7 July 1922 (List)
- Fate: Sold for scrap 18 April 1939
- Operations: World War I escort, conversion to a destroyer minelayer

=== USS Luce ===
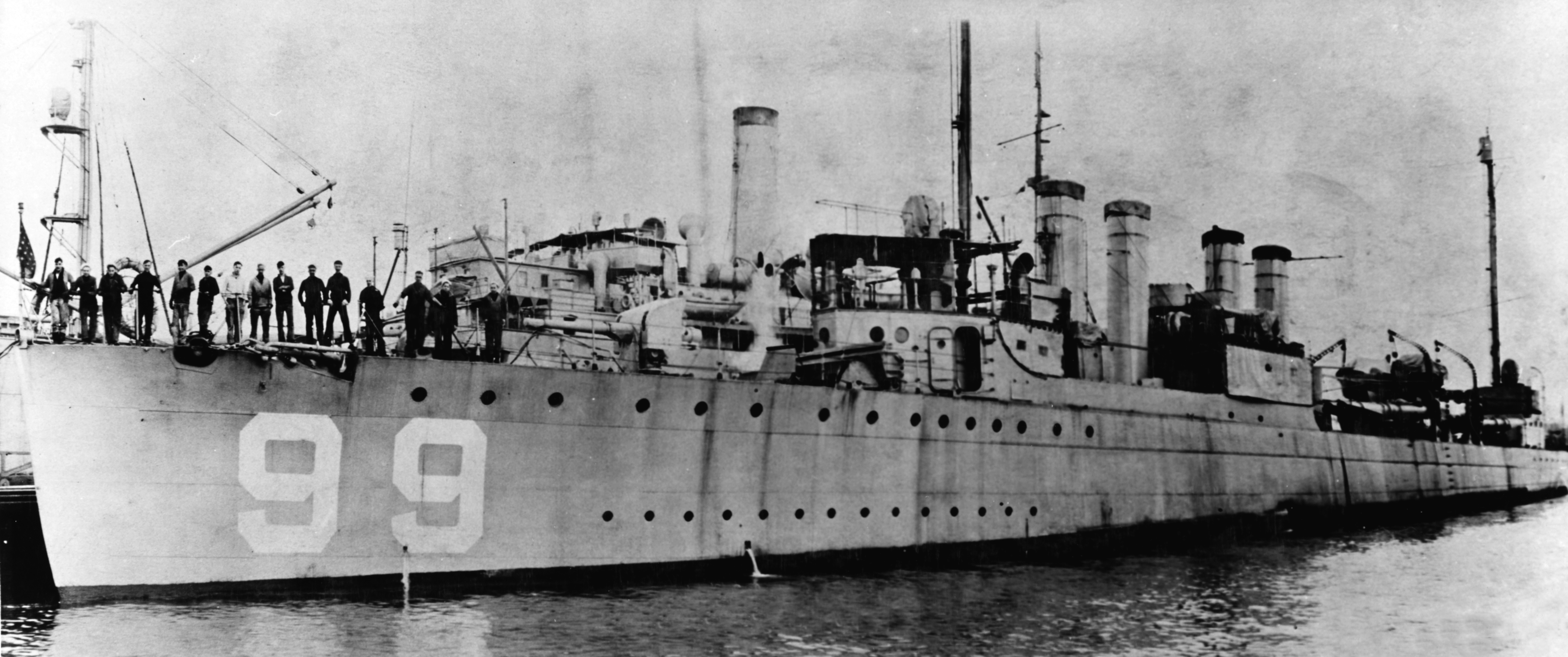
USS Luce

- Designation: Destroyer No. 99, DD-99, DM-4
- Builders: United States (Fore River Shipbuilding in Quincy, Massachusetts)
- Laid down: 9 February 1918
- Launched: 29 June 1918 (List)
- Operator: United States Navy
- Commissioned: 11 September 1918 (List)
- Decommissioned: 31 January 1931 (List)
- Fate: Sold for scrap 13 November 1936
- Operations: World War I Mediterranean escort, Food Commission patrol, conversion to a destroyer minelayer, Canal Zone Control Force

=== USS Maury ===
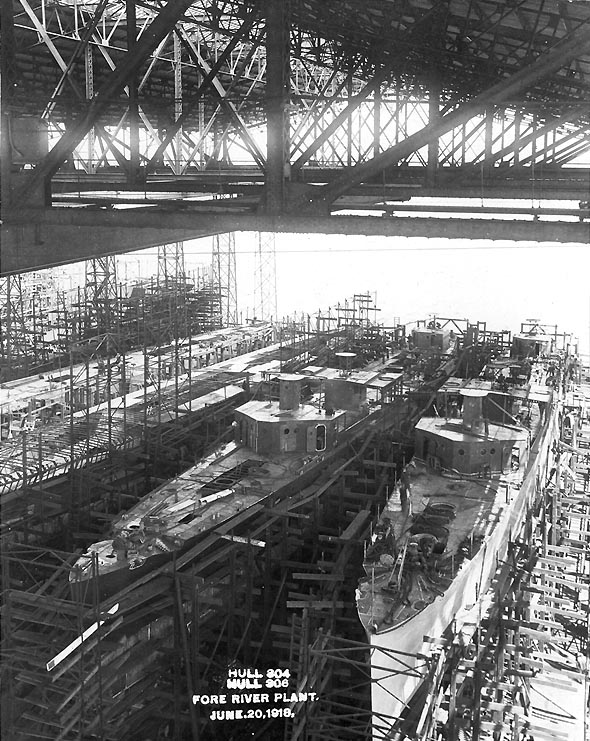

- Designation: Destroyer No. 100, DD-100, DM-5
- Builders: United States (Fore River Shipbuilding in Quincy, Massachusetts)
- Laid down: 4 May 1918
- Launched: 4 July 1918 (List)
- Operator: United States Navy
- Commissioned: 23 September 1918 (List)
- Decommissioned: 19 March 1930 (List)
- Fate: Sold for scrap 1 May 1934
- Operations: World War I Mediterranean patrol, conversion to a destroyer minelayer

=== USS Lansdale ===
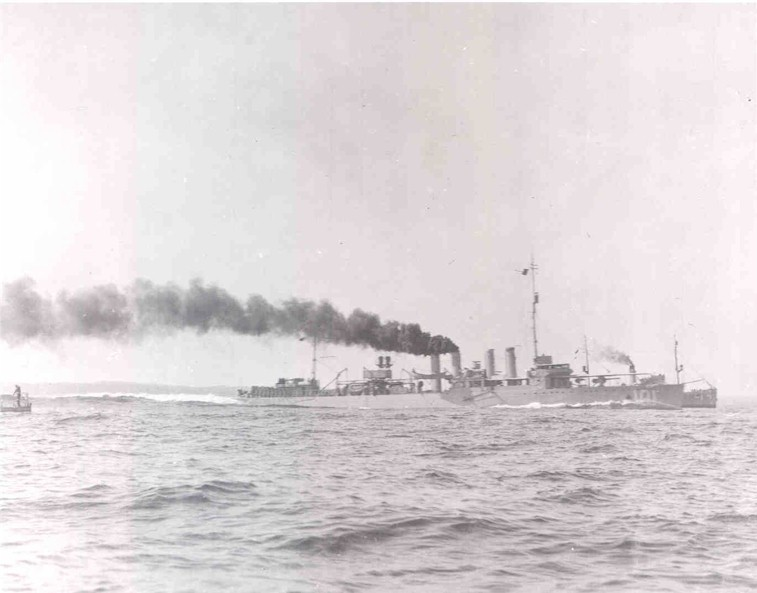

- Designation: Destroyer No. 101, DD-101, DM-6
- Builders: United States (Fore River Shipbuilding in Quincy, Massachusetts)
- Laid down: 20 April 1918
- Launched: 21 July 1918 (List)
- Operator: United States Navy
- Commissioned: 26 October 1918 (List)
- Decommissioned: 24 March 1931 (List)
- Fate: Sold for scrap 28 December 1936
- Operations: World War I Atlantic and Mediterranean patrol, conversion to a destroyer minelayer

=== USS Mahan ===
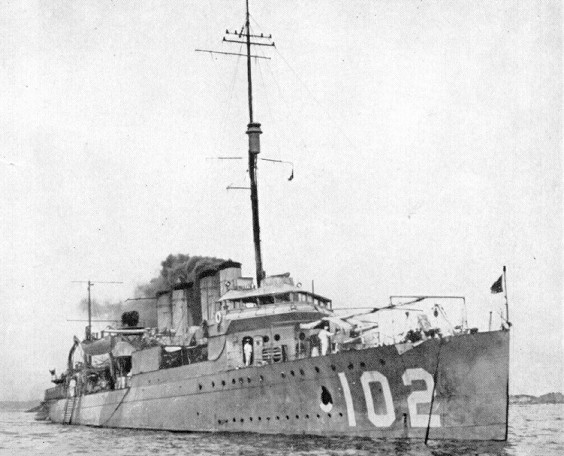

- Designation: Destroyer No. 102, DD-102, DM-7
- Builders: United States (Fore River Shipbuilding in Quincy, Massachusetts)
- Laid down: 4 May 1918
- Launched: 4 August 1918 (List)
- Operator: United States Navy
- Commissioned: 24 October 1918 (List)
- Decommissioned: 1 May 1930 (List)
- Fate: Sold for scrap 22 October 1930
- Operations: World War I Caribbean patrol, conversion to a destroyer minelayer

=== USS Schley ===
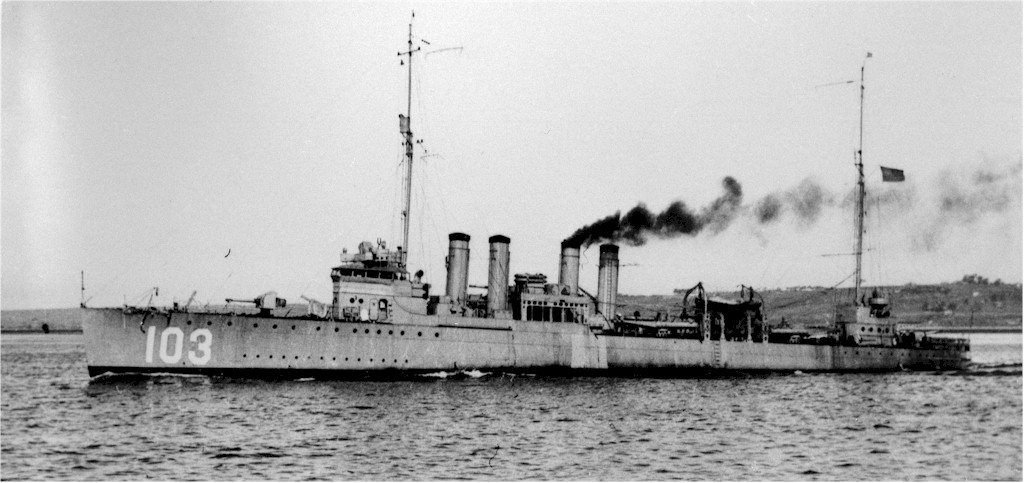

- Designation: Destroyer No. 103, DD-103, APD-14
- Builders: United States (Fore River Shipbuilding in Quincy, Massachusetts)
- Laid down: 29 October 1917
- Launched: 28 March 1918 (List)
- Operator: United States Navy
- Commissioned: 20 September 1918 (List)
- Decommissioned: 9 November 1945 (List)
- Fate: Sold for scrap 1946
- Operations: World War I Mediterranean patrol, Attack on Pearl Harbor, World War II fast transport

=== USS Champlin ===
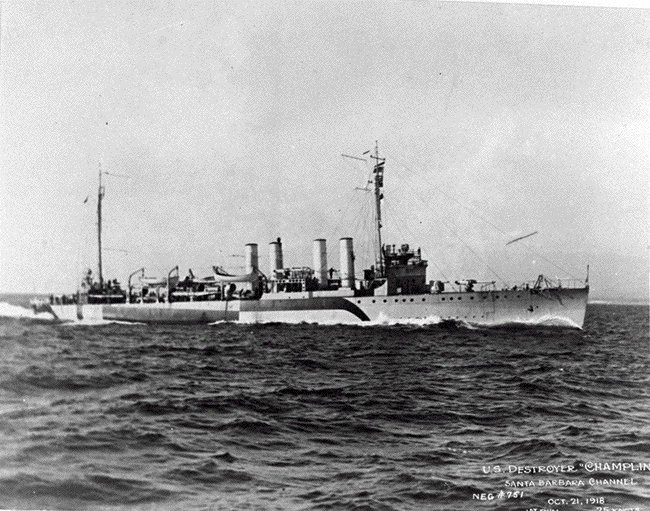

- Designation: Destroyer No. 104, DD-104
- Builders: United States (Union Iron Works in San Francisco, California)
- Laid down: 31 October 1917
- Launched: 7 April 1918 (List)
- Operator: United States Navy
- Commissioned: 11 November 1918 (List)
- Decommissioned: 7 June 1922 (List)
- Fate: Sunk in trials 12 April 1936
- Operations: Training operations

=== USS Mugford ===
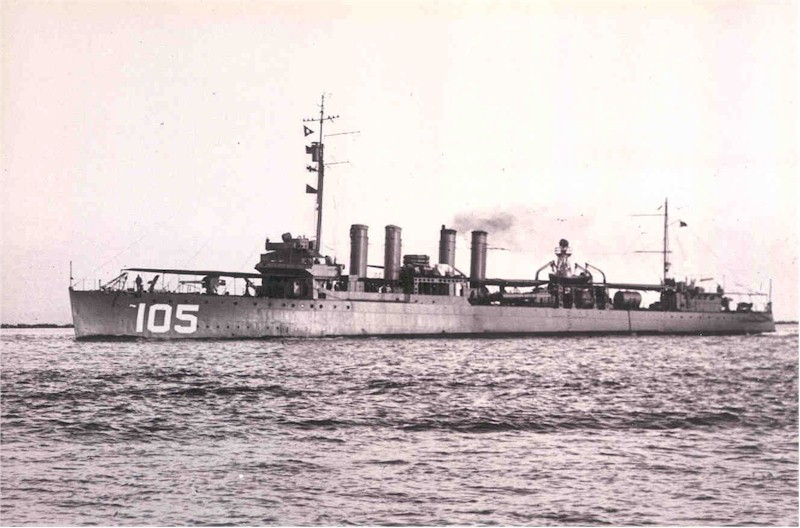

- Designation: Destroyer No. 105, DD-105
- Builders: United States (Union Iron Works in San Francisco, California)
- Laid down: 20 December 1917
- Launched: 14 April 1918 (List)
- Operator: United States Navy
- Commissioned: 25 November 1918 (List)
- Decommissioned: 7 June 1922 (List)
- Fate: Sold for scrap in 1936
- Operations: Peacetime operations

=== USS Chew ===
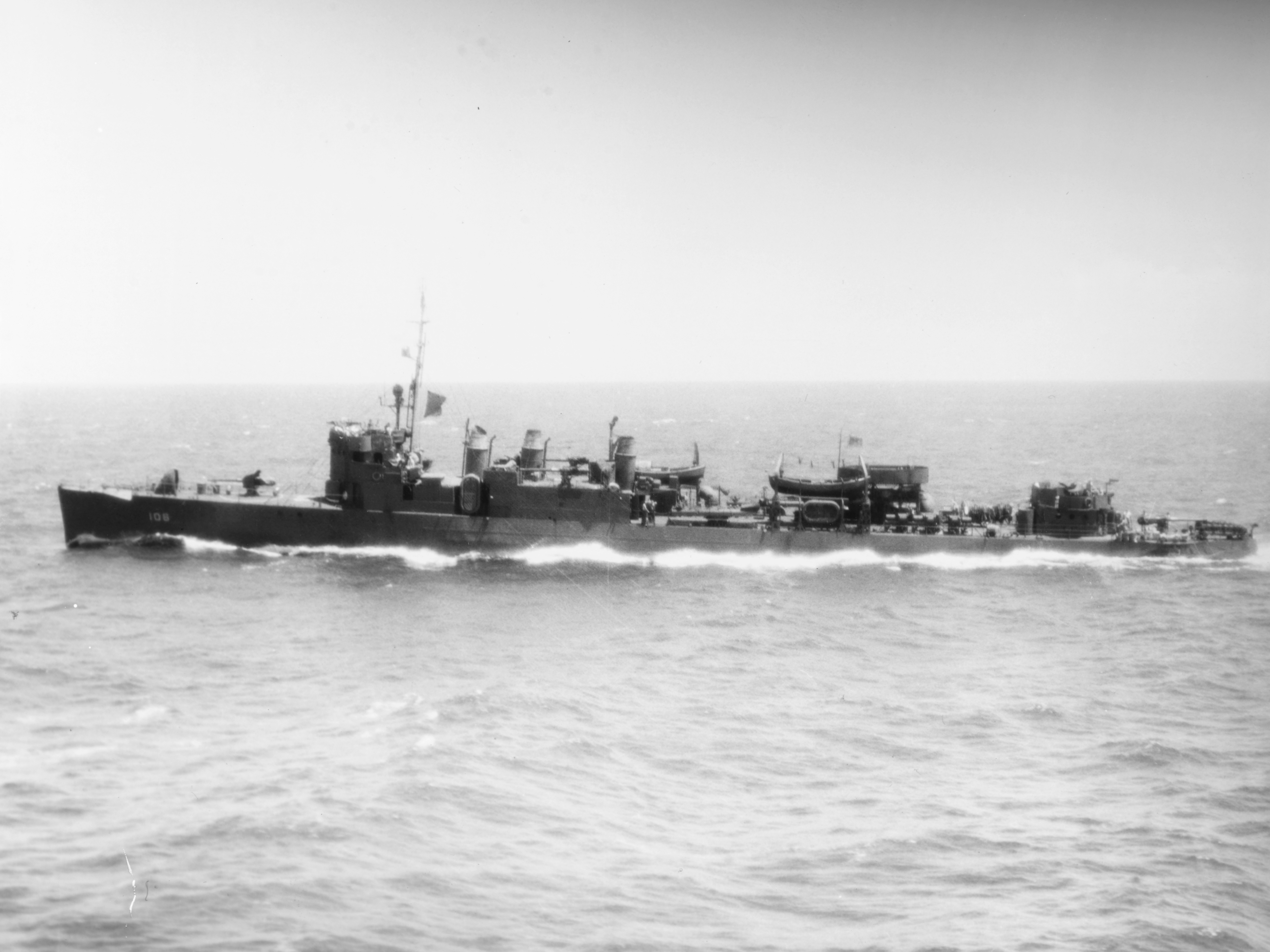
Chew in 1945

- Designation: Destroyer No. 106, DD-106
- Builders: United States (Union Iron Works in San Francisco, California)
- Laid down: 2 January 1918
- Launched: 26 May 1918 (List)
- Operator: United States Navy
- Commissioned: 12 December 1918 (List)
- Decommissioned: 10 October 1945 (List)
- Fate: 4 October 1946 Sold
- Operations: Attack on Pearl Harbor, Pearl Harbor area patrol

=== USS Hazelwood ===
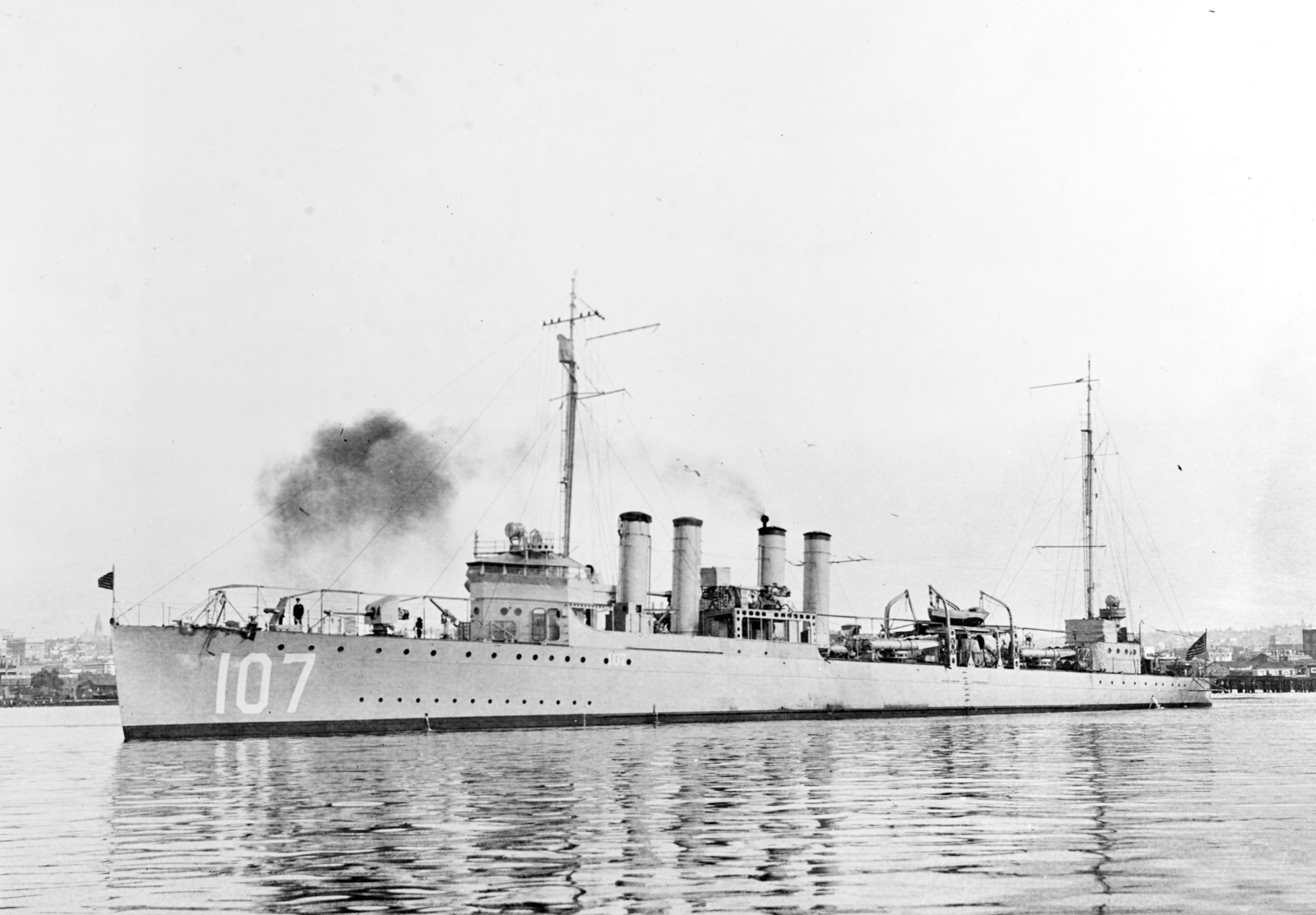

- Designation: Destroyer No. 107, DD-107
- Builders: United States (Union Iron Works in San Francisco, California)
- Laid down: 24 December 1917
- Launched: 22 June 1918 (List)
- Operator: United States Navy
- Commissioned: 20 February 1919 (List)
- Decommissioned: 15 November 1930 (List)
- Fate: Scrapped, 14 April 1930
- Operations: None

=== USS Williams (HMCS St. Clair) ===
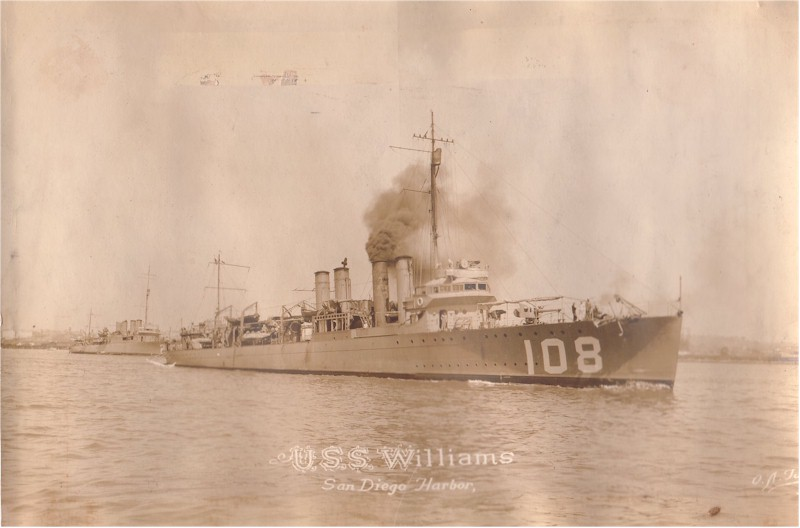

- Designation: Destroyer No. 108, DD-108, I-65
- Builders: United States (Union Iron Works in San Francisco, California)
- Laid down: 25 March 1918
- Launched: 4 July 1918 (List)
- Operator: United States Navy
- Commissioned: 1 March 1919 (List)
- Decommissioned: 24 September 1940 (List)
- Operator: Royal Canadian Navy
- Commissioned: 24 September 1940 (List)
- Decommissioned: August 1944 (List)
- Fate: Scrapped 6 October 1946
- Operations: Neutrality Patrol, World War II Atlantic convoy escort, submarine depot ship, damage control hulk

=== USS Crane ===
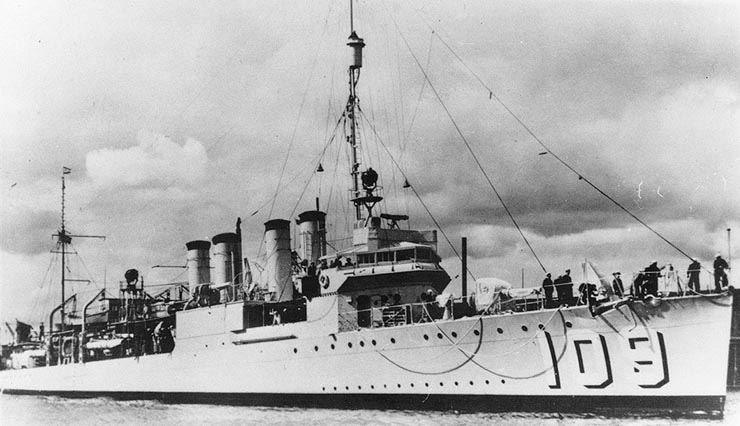

- Designation: Destroyer No. 109, DD-109
- Builders: United States (Union Iron Works in San Francisco, California)
- Laid down: 7 January 1918
- Launched: 4 July 1918 (List)
- Operator: United States Navy
- Commissioned: 18 April 1919 (List)
- Decommissioned: 14 November 1945 (List)
- Fate: Sold for scrap 1 November 1946
- Operations: Neutrality Patrol, World War II US Pacific Coast patrol and training operations

=== USS Hart ===
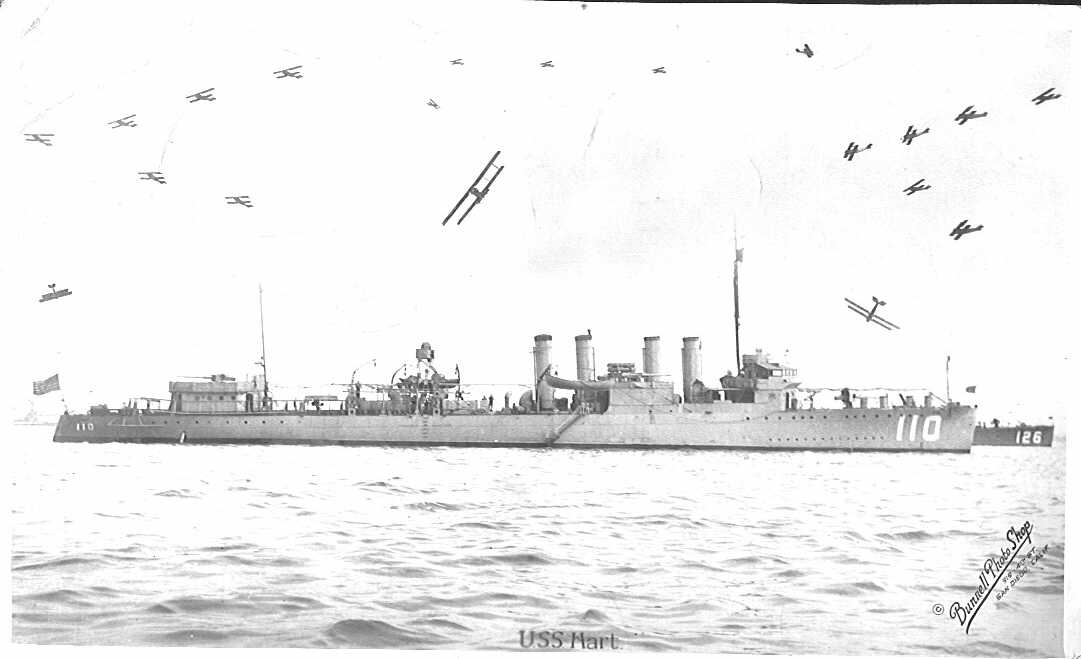

- Designation: Destroyer No. 110, DD-110
- Builders: United States (Union Iron Works in San Francisco, California)
- Laid down: 8 January 1918
- Launched: 4 July 1918 (List)
- Operator: United States Navy
- Commissioned: 26 May 1919 (List)
- Decommissioned: 1 June 1931 (List)
- Fate: Sold for scrap 25 February 1932
- Operations: Asiatic Fleet

=== USS Ingraham ===
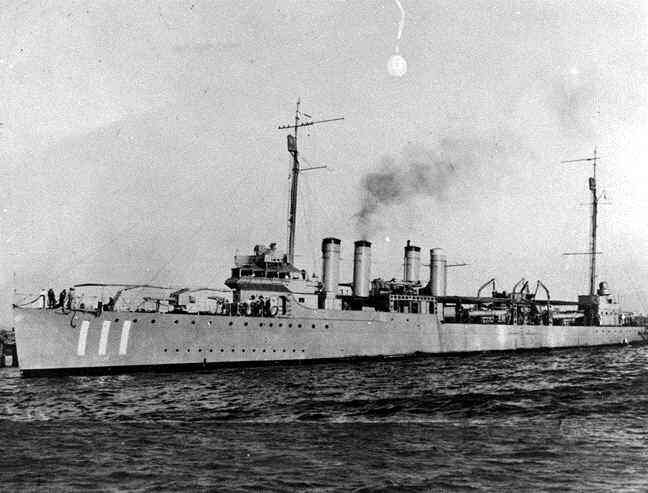

- Designation: Destroyer No. 111, DD-111, DM-9
- Builders: United States (Union Iron Works in San Francisco, California)
- Laid down: 12 January 1918
- Launched: 4 July 1918 (List)
- Operator: United States Navy
- Commissioned: 15 May 1919 (List)
- Decommissioned: 29 June 1922 (List)
- Fate: Sold for scrap
- Operations: Minelayer conversion

=== USS Ludlow ===
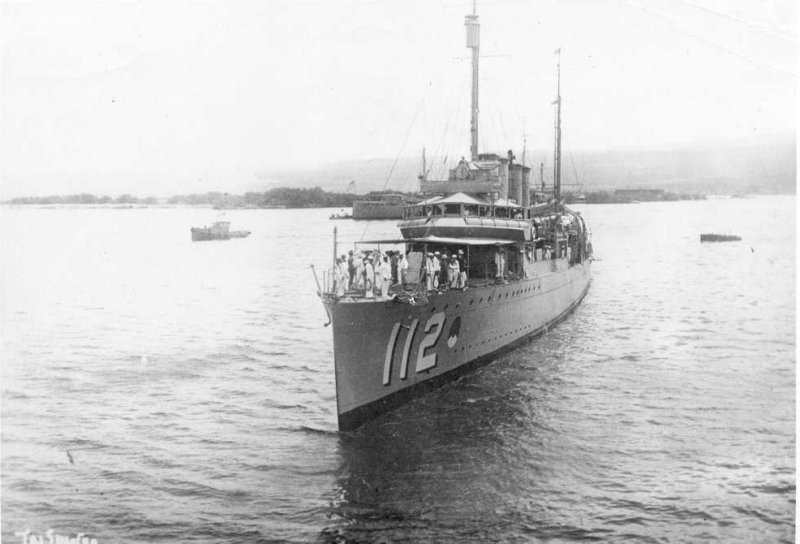

- Designation: Destroyer No. 112, DD-112, DM-10
- Builders: United States (Union Iron Works in San Francisco, California)
- Laid down: 7 January 1918
- Launched: 9 June 1918 (List)
- Operator: United States Navy
- Commissioned: 23 December 1918 (List)
- Decommissioned: 24 May 1930 (List)
- Fate: Sold for scrap 10 March 1931
- Operations: Minelayer conversion

=== USS Rathburne ===
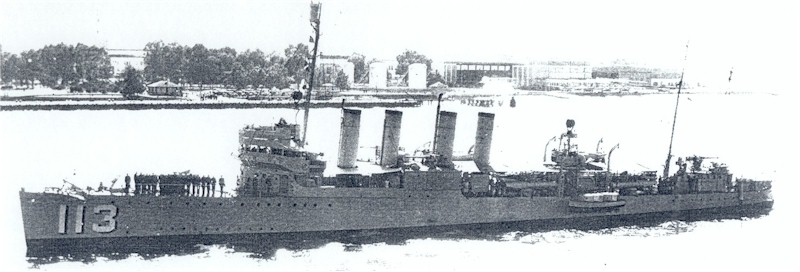

- Designation: Destroyer No. 113, DD-113, APD-25
- Builders: United States (William Cramp & Sons in Philadelphia)
- Laid down: 12 July 1917
- Launched: 17 December 1917 (List)
- Operator: United States Navy
- Commissioned: 24 June 1918 (List)
- Decommissioned: 2 November 1945 (List)
- Fate: Sold for scrap November 1946
- Operations: World War I convoy escort; Asiatic Fleet; World War II training ship and high speed transport
- Victories: 2 Japanese aircraft

=== USS Talbot ===
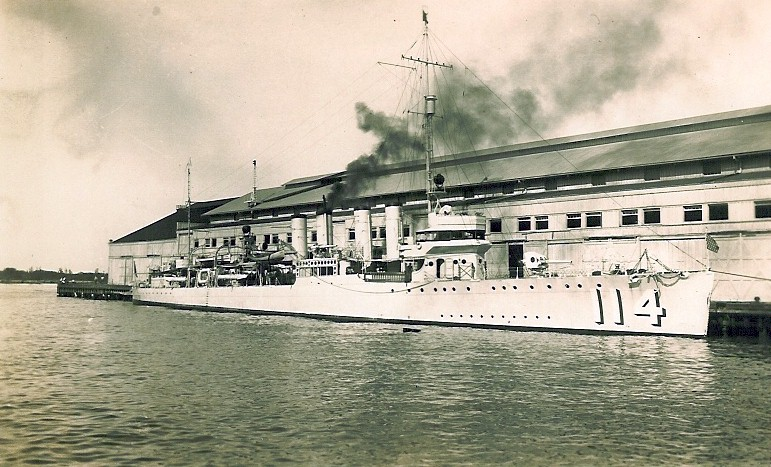

- Designation: Destroyer No. 114, DD-114, APD-7
- Builders: United States (William Cramp & Sons in Philadelphia)
- Laid down: 12 July 1917
- Launched: 20 February 1918 (List)
- Operator: United States Navy
- Commissioned: 20 July 1918 (List)
- Decommissioned: 9 October 1945 (List)
- Fate: Sold for scrap 30 January 1946
- Operations: World War II high speed transport

=== USS Waters ===
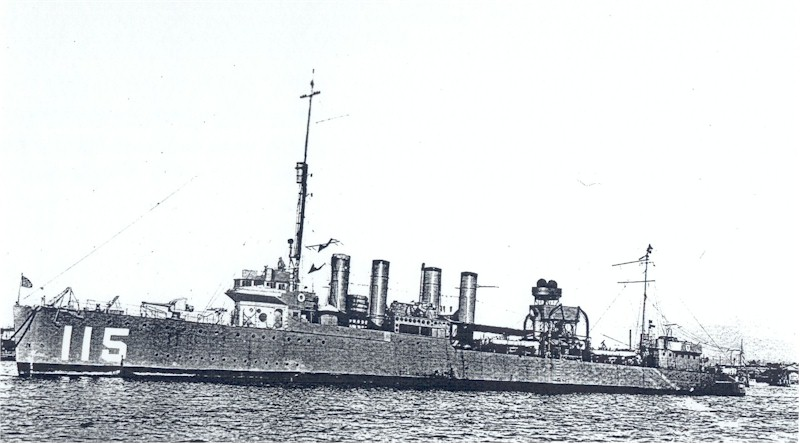

- Designation: Destroyer No. 115, DD-115, APD-8
- Builders: United States (William Cramp & Sons in Philadelphia)
- Laid down: 26 July 1917
- Launched: 3 March 1918 (List)
- Operator: United States Navy
- Commissioned: 8 August 1918 (List)
- Decommissioned: 12 October 1945 (List)
- Fate: Sold for scrap 10 May 1946
- Operations: World War I convoy escort, World War II high speed transport

=== USS Dent ===
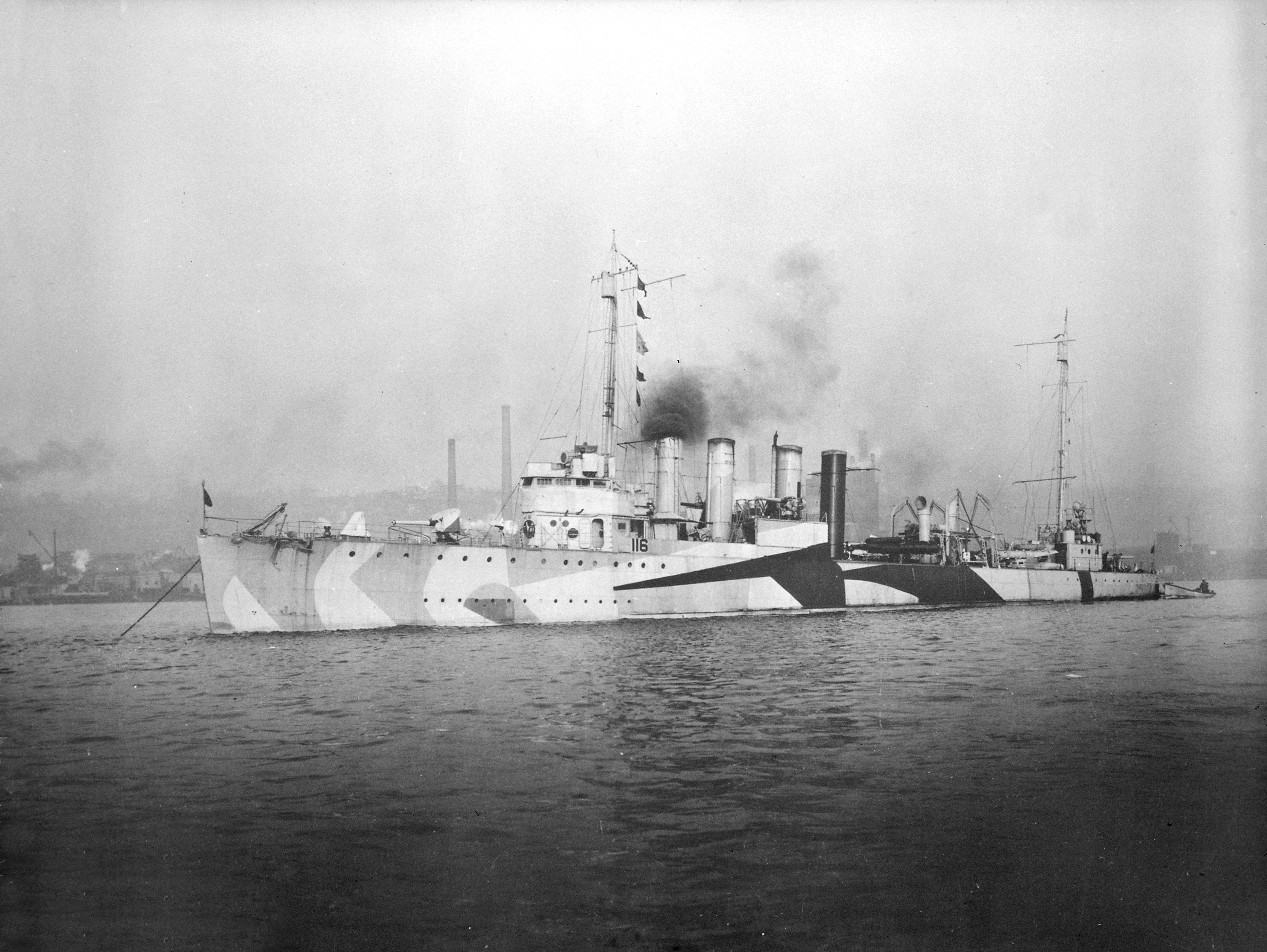

- Designation: Destroyer No. 116, DD-116, APD-9
- Builders: United States (William Cramp & Sons in Philadelphia)
- Laid down: 30 August 1917
- Launched: 23 March 1918 (List)
- Operator: United States Navy
- Commissioned: 9 September 1918 (List)
- Decommissioned: 4 December 1945 (List)
- Fate: Sold for scrap 13 June 1946
- Operations: World War I convoy escort, World War II high speed transport

=== USS Dorsey ===
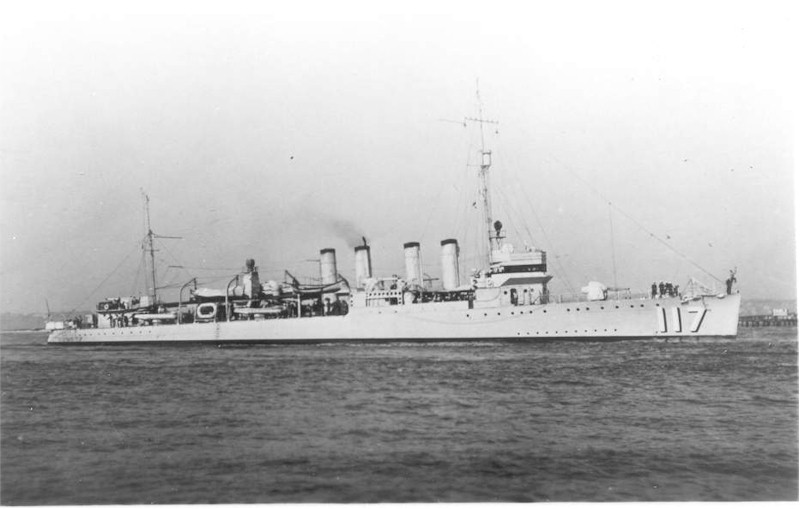

- Designation: Destroyer No. 117, DD-117, DMS-1
- Builders: United States (William Cramp & Sons in Philadelphia)
- Laid down: 18 September 1917
- Launched: 9 April 1918 (List)
- Operator: United States Navy
- Commissioned: 16 September 1918 (List)
- Decommissioned: 8 December 1945 (List)
- Fate: Grounded by a typhoon 9 October 1945 (List) and destroyed 1 January 1946
- Operations: World War I convoy escort, World War II high speed mine-sweeper

=== USS Lea ===
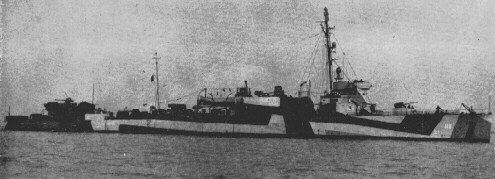

- Designation: Destroyer No. 118, DD-118
- Builders: United States (William Cramp & Sons in Philadelphia)
- Laid down: 18 September 1918
- Launched: 29 April 1918 (List)
- Operator: United States Navy
- Commissioned: 2 October 1918 (List)
- Decommissioned: 20 July 1945 (List)
- Fate: Sold for scrapping 30 November 1946
- Operations: World War II convoy escort and training ship

=== USS Lamberton ===
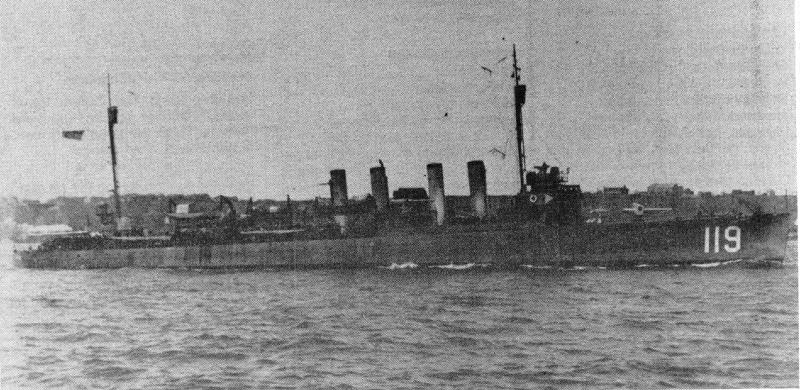

- Designation: Destroyer No. 119, DD-119, AG-21, DMS-2
- Builders: United States (Newport News Shipbuilding Company in Newport News, Virginia)
- Laid down: 1 October 1917
- Launched: 30 March 1918 (List)
- Operator: United States Navy
- Commissioned: 22 August 1918 (List)
- Decommissioned: 13 December 1946 (List)
- Fate: Sold for scrapping 9 May 1949
- Operations: Gunnery training, minesweeping, Aleutian Campaign

=== USS Radford ===
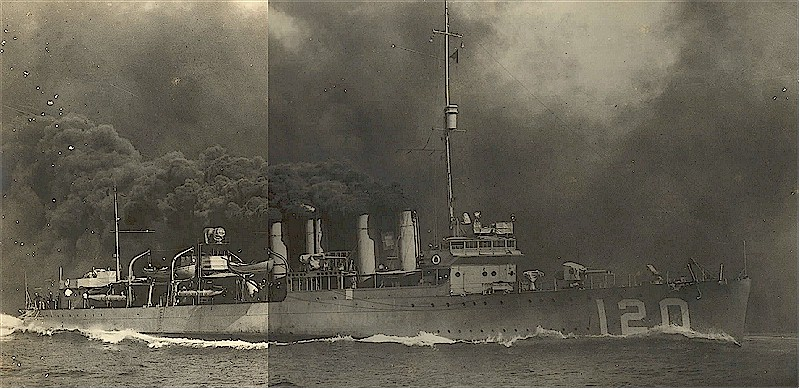

- Designation: Destroyer No. 120, DD-120, AG-22
- Builders: United States (Newport News Shipbuilding Company in Newport News, Virginia)
- Laid down: 2 October 1917
- Launched: 5 April 1918 (List)
- Operator: United States Navy
- Commissioned: 30 September 1918 (List)
- Decommissioned: 9 June 1922 (List)
- Fate: Sunk in accordance with the London Treaty on 5 August 1936
- Operations: World War I convoy escort

=== USS Montgomery ===
- Designation: Destroyer No. 121, DD-121, DM-17
- Builders: United States (Newport News Shipbuilding Company in Newport News, Virginia)
- Laid down: 2 October 1917
- Launched: 23 March 1918 (List)
- Operator: United States Navy
- Commissioned: 26 July 1918 (List)
- Decommissioned: 23 April 1945 (List)
- Fate: Sold for scrap 11 March 1946
- Operations: World War I convoy escort, World War II minelayer and patrols, Solomons, Aleutian, Kwajalein, Peleliu

=== USS Breese ===
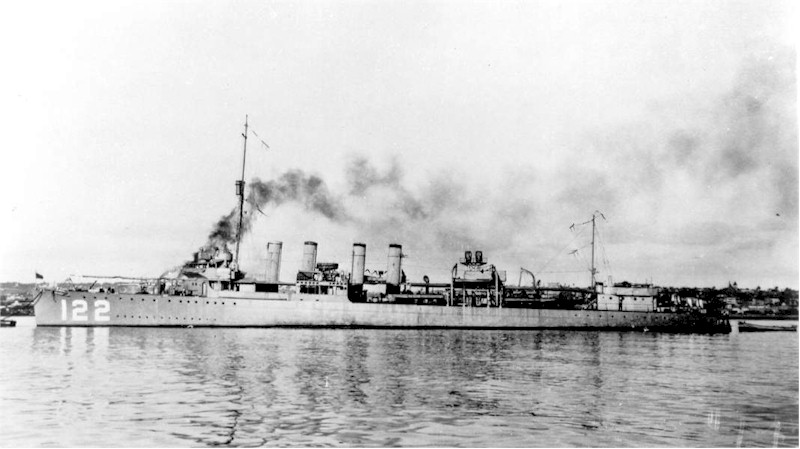

- Designation: Destroyer No. 122, DD-122, DM-18
- Builders: United States (Newport News Shipbuilding Company in Newport News, Virginia)
- Laid down: 10 November 1917
- Launched: 11 May 1918 (List)
- Operator: United States Navy
- Commissioned: 23 October 1918 (List)
- Decommissioned: 15 January 1946 (List)
- Fate: Sold for scrap 16 May 1946
- Operations: World War I convoy escort, minelayer conversion, Attack on Pearl Harbor, Solomons, Leyte, Lingayen Gulf, Okinawa

=== USS Gamble ===
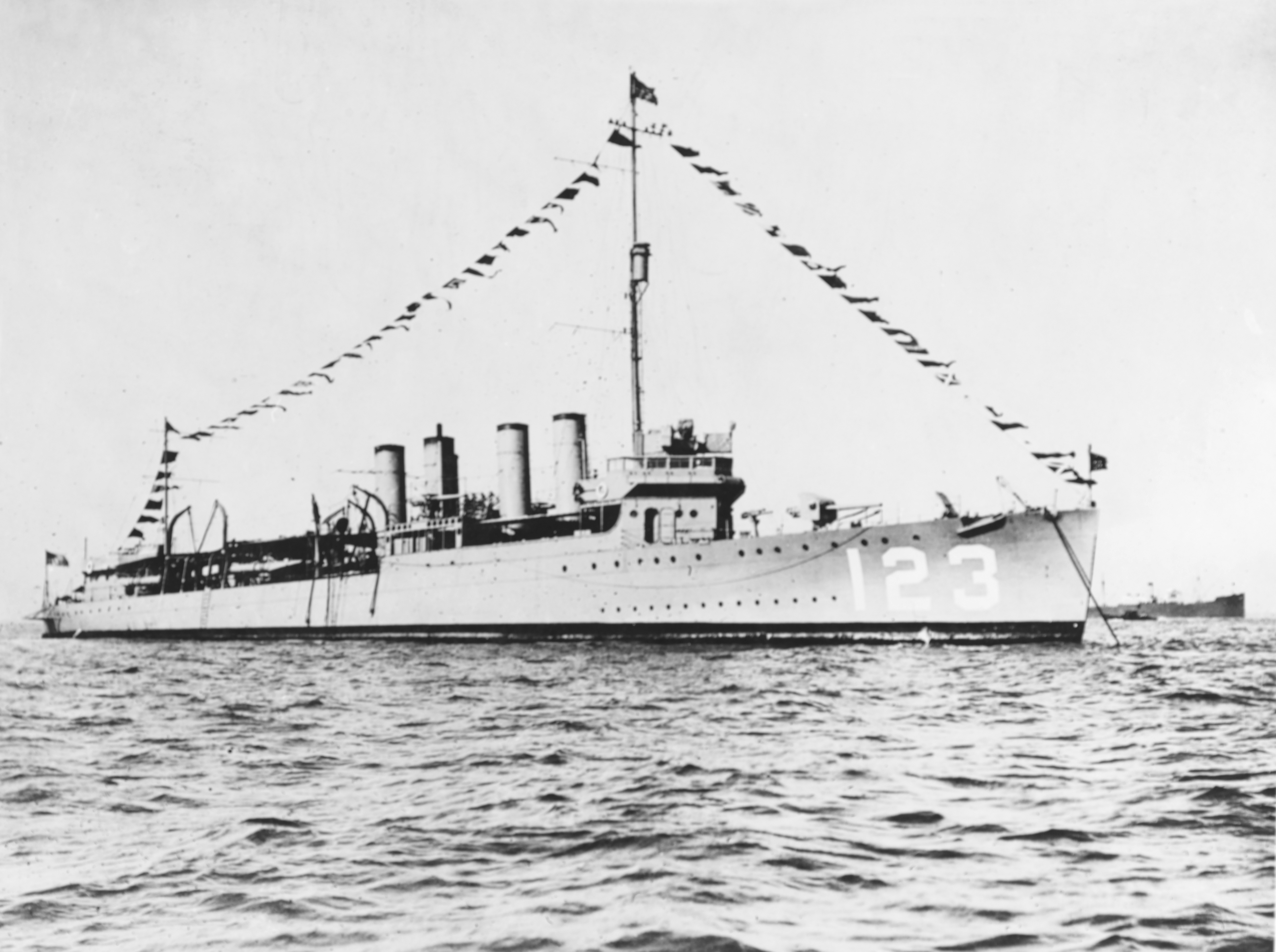

=== USS Ramsay ===
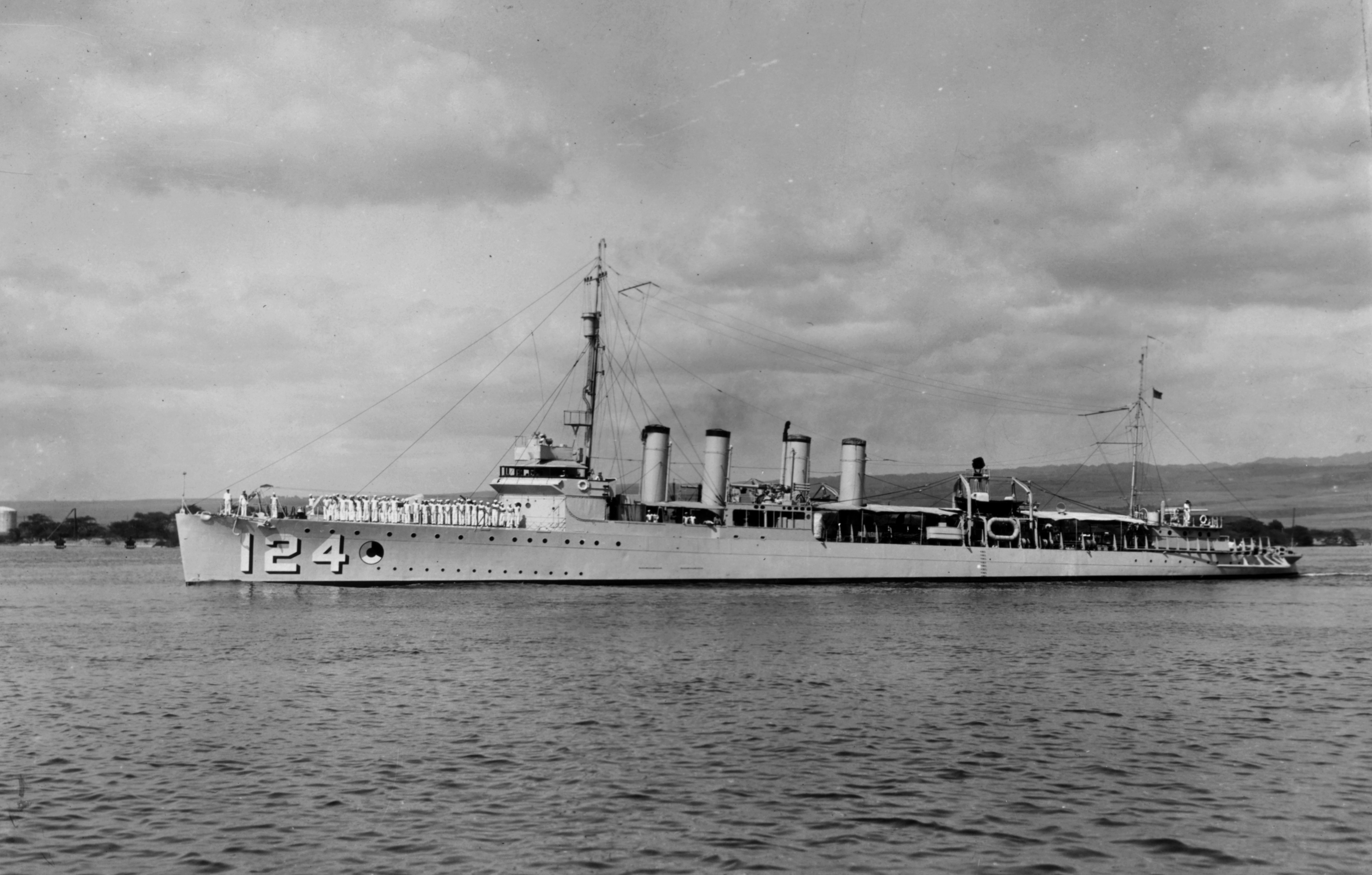

=== USS Tattnall ===
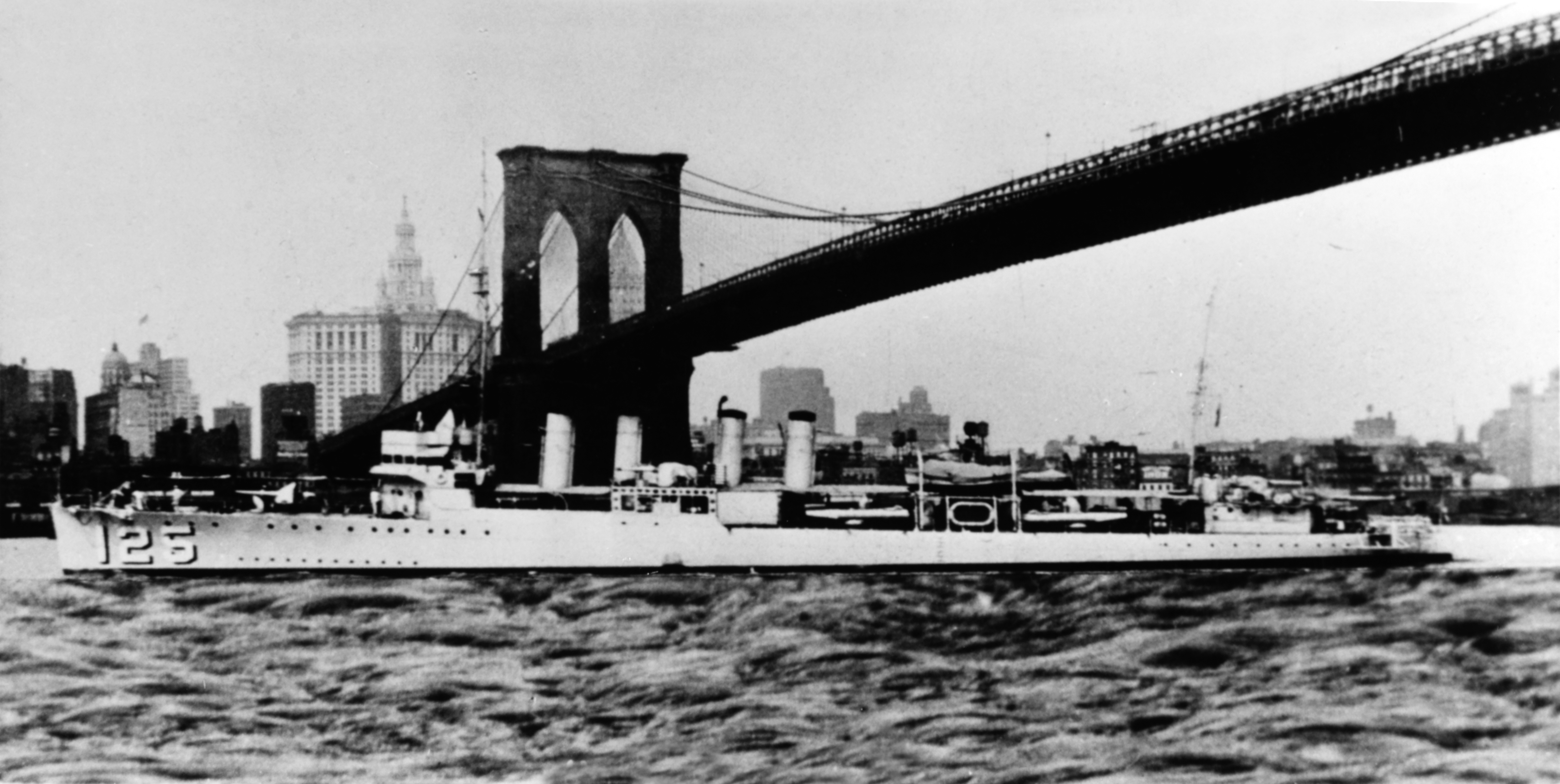

=== USS Badger ===
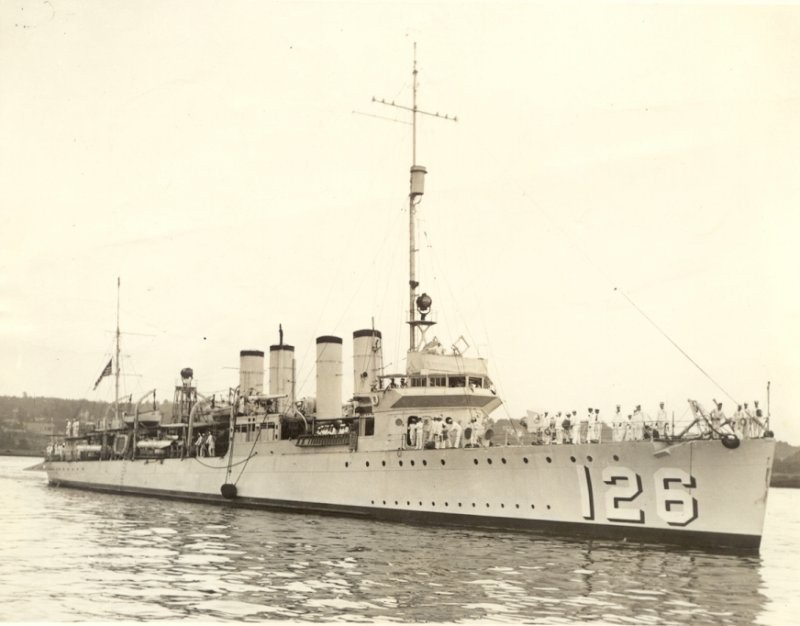

=== USS Babbitt ===
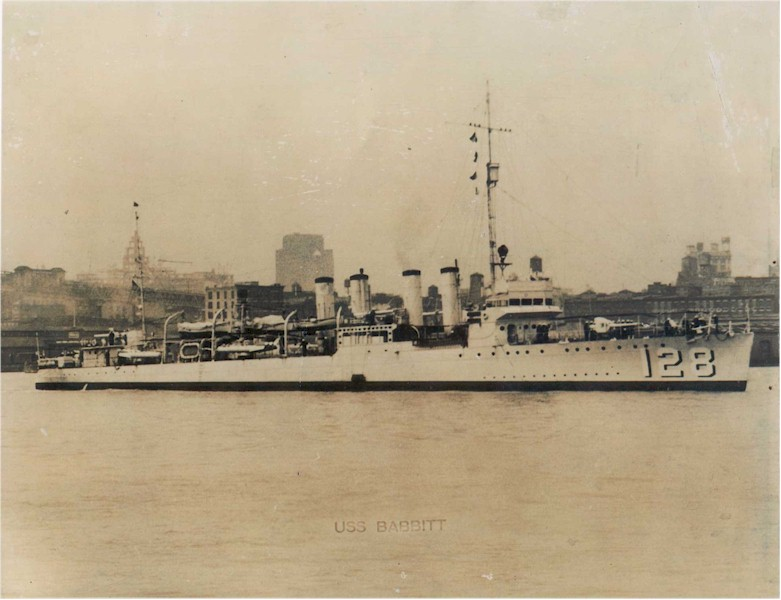

=== USS DeLong ===
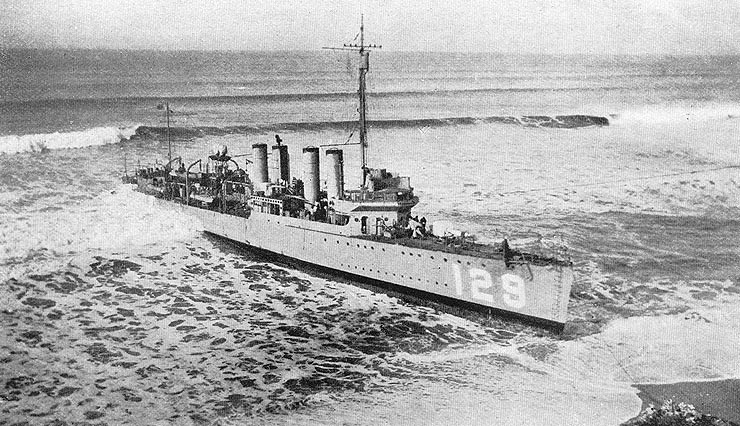

=== USS Jacob Jones ===
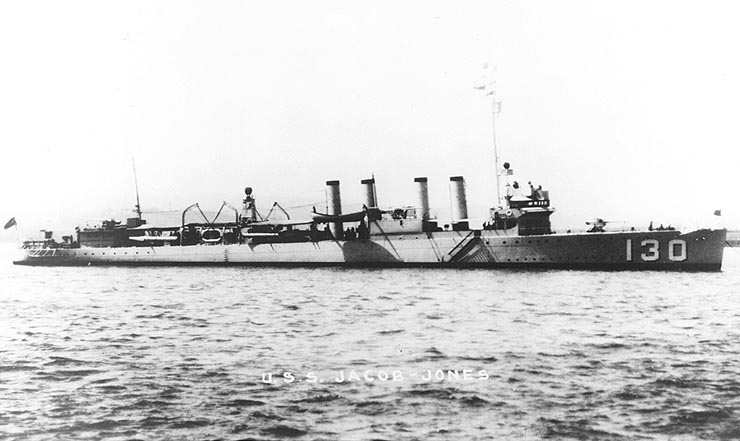

=== USS Buchanan (HMS Campbeltown) ===
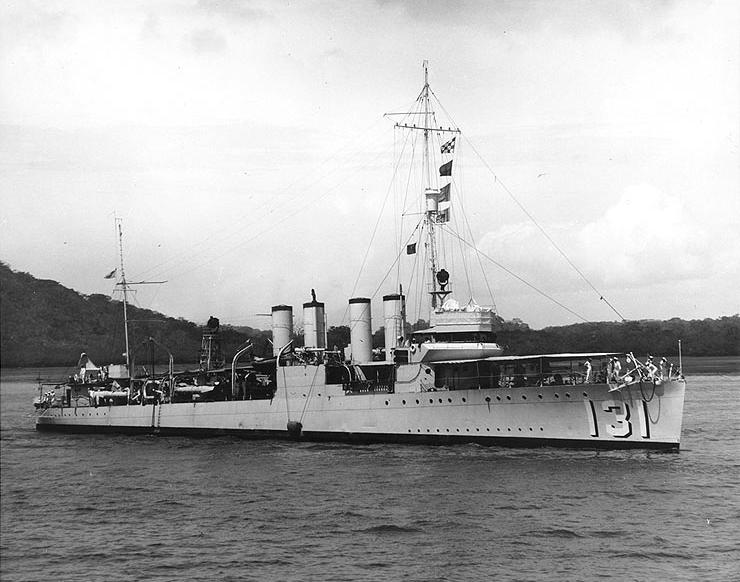
Buchanan

- Designation: Destroyer No. 131, DD-131.
- Builders: United States (Bath Iron Works in Bath, Maine)
- Laid down: 29 June 1918
- Launched: 2 January 1919 (List)
- Operator: United States Navy
- Commissioned: 20 January 1919 (List)
- Decommissioned: 9 September 1940 (List)
- Operator: Royal Navy
- Commissioned: 9 September 1940 (List)
- Fate: Deliberately destroyed in St Nazaire Raid 28 March 1942
- Operations: World War I and II convoy escort. Famed for destroying the Normandie Dry Dock gates at St Nazaire

=== USS Aaron Ward ===
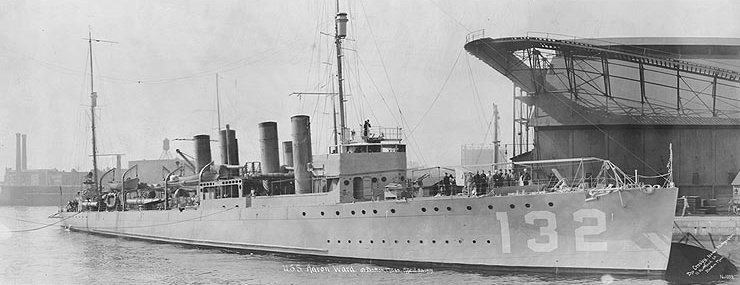

- Designation: Destroyer No. 132, DD-132
- Builders:
- Laid down:
- Launched:
- Operator:
- Commissioned:
- Decommissioned:

=== USS Hale ===
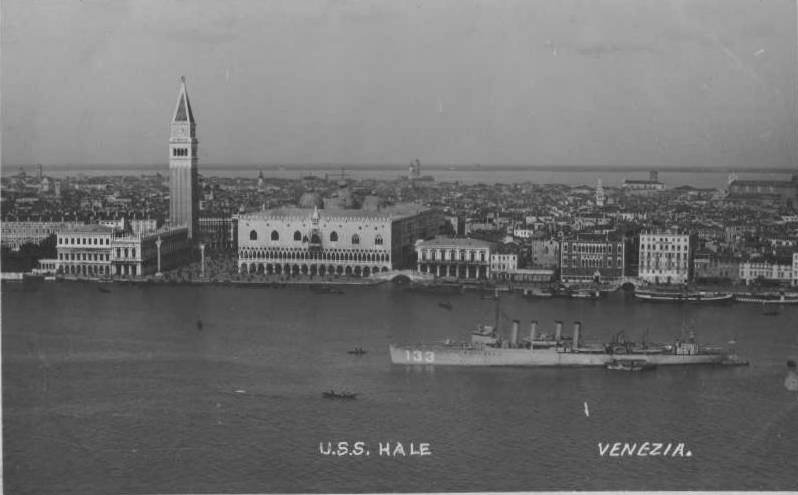

=== USS Crowninshield (HMS Chelsea) - (Later Soviet Derzkiy: "Ardent") ===
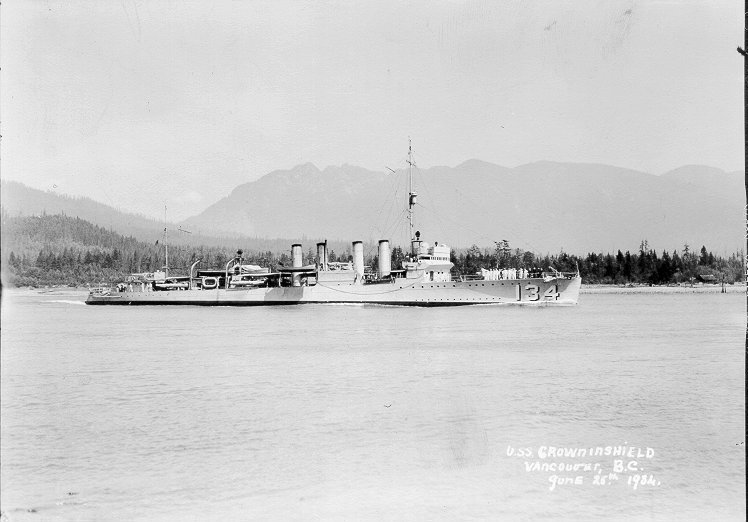

=== USS Tillman ===
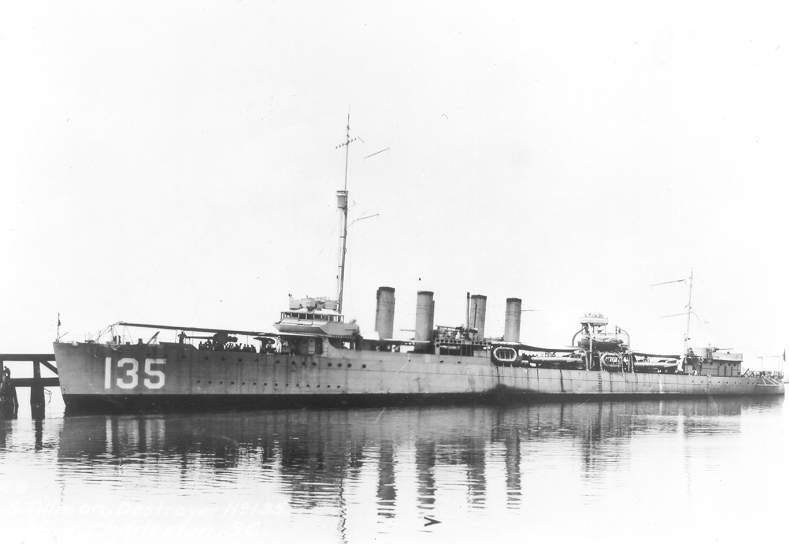

A further 50 ships were built.

== Tabulated details ==
Hull no.	Ship name	Builder	Laid down	Launched	Commissioned	Fate	Service notes
DD-075	Wickes	Bath Iron Works	26 June 1917	25 June 1918	31 July 1918	Scrapped by UK, 1945	
DD-076	Philip	Bath Iron Works	1 September 1917	25 July 1918	24 August 1918	Scrapped by UK, 1947	
DD-077	Woolsey	Bath Iron Works	1 November 1917	17 September 1918	30 September 1918	Sunk following accident, 21 February 1921	
DD-078	Evans	Bath Iron Works	28 December 1917	30 October 1918	11 November 1918	Scrapped by UK, 1945	
DD-079	Little	Fore River Shipyard	18 June 1917	11 November 1917	6 April 1918	Sunk in battle, 5 September 1942	
DD-080	Kimberly	Fore River Shipyard	21 June 1917	14 December 1917	26 April 1918	Scrapped by US, 20 April 1939	
DD-081	Sigourney	Fore River Shipyard	25 August 1917	16 December 1917	15 May 1918	Scrapped by UK, 18 February 1947	
DD-082	Gregory	Fore River Shipyard	25 August 1917	27 January 1918	1 June 1918	Sunk in battle, 5 September 1942	
DD-083	Stringham	Fore River Shipyard	19 September 1917	30 March 1918	2 July 1918	Scrapped by US, March 1946	
DD-084	Dyer	Fore River Shipyard	26 September 1917	13 April 1918	1 July 1918	Scrapped by US, 8 September 1936	
DD-085	Colhoun	Fore River Shipyard	19 September 1917	21 February 1918	13 June 1918	Sunk in battle, 30 August 1942	
DD-086	Stevens	Fore River Shipyard	20 September 1917	13 January 1918	24 May 1918	Sold for scrap, 8 September 1936	
DD-087	McKee	Union Iron Works	29 October 1917	23 March 1918	7 September 1918	Scrapped by US, January 1936	
DD-088	Robinson	Union Iron Works	31 October 1917	28 March 1918	19 October 1918	Scrapped by UK, September 1945	
DD-089	Ringgold	Union Iron Works	20 October 1917	14 April 1918	14 November 1918	Scrapped by UK, 18 February 1947	
DD-090	McKean	Union Iron Works	12 February 1918	4 July 1918	25 February 1919	Sunk in battle, 17 November 1943	
DD-091	Harding	Union Iron Works	12 February 1918	4 July 1918	4 January 1919	Scrapped by US, 8 September 1936	
DD-092	Gridley	Union Iron Works	1 April 1918	4 July 1918	8 March 1919	Scrapped by US, 19 April 1939	
DD-093	Fairfax	Mare Island Navy Yard	10 July 1917	15 December 1917	6 April 1918	Scrapped by UK, 23 June 1949	
DD-094	Taylor	Mare Island Navy Yard	15 October 1917	14 February 1918	1 June 1918	Scrapped by US, August 1945	
DD-095	Bell	Fore River Shipyard	16 November 1917	20 April 1918	31 July 1918	Scrapped by US, 18 April 1939	
DD-096	Stribling	Fore River Shipyard	14 December 1917	29 May 1918	16 August 1918	Sunk as target, January 1937	
DD-097	Murray	Fore River Shipyard	22 December 1917	8 June 1918	21 August 1918	Scrapped by US, 29 September 1936	
DD-098	Israel	Fore River Shipyard	26 January 1918	22 June 1918	13 September 1918	Scrapped by US, 18 April 1939	
DD-099	Luce	Fore River Shipyard	9 February 1918	29 June 1918	11 September 1918	Scrapped by US, 13 November 1936	
DD-100	Maury	Fore River Shipyard	4 May 1918	4 July 1918	23 September 1918	Scrapped by US, 1 May 1934	
DD-101	Lansdale	Fore River Shipyard	20 April 1918	21 July 1918	26 October 1918	Scrapped by US, 28 December 1936	
DD-102	Mahan	Fore River Shipyard	4 May 1918	4 August 1918	24 October 1918	Scrapped by US, 17 January 1931	
DD-103	Schley	Union Iron Works	29 October 1917	28 March 1918	20 September 1918	Scrapped by US, 1946	
DD-104	Champlin	Union Iron Works	31 October 1917	7 April 1918	11 November 1918	Sunk in tests, 12 April 1936	
DD-105	Mugford	Union Iron Works	20 December 1917	14 April 1918	25 November 1918	Scrapped by US, 1936	
DD-106	Chew	Union Iron Works	2 January 1918	26 May 1918	12 December 1918	Scrapped by US, 4 October 1946	
DD-107	Hazelwood	Union Iron Works	24 December 1917	22 June 1918	20 February 1919	Scrapped by US, 14 April 1930	
DD-108	Williams	Union Iron Works	25 March 1918	4 July 1918	1 March 1919	Scrapped by UK, 1946	
DD-109	Crane	Union Iron Works	7 January 1918	4 July 1918	18 April 1919	Scrapped by US, 1 November 1946	
DD-110	Hart	Union Iron Works	8 January 1918	4 July 1918	26 May 1919	Scrapped by US, 25 February 1932	
DD-111	Ingraham	Union Iron Works	12 January 1918	4 July 1918	15 May 1919	Scrapped by US, 1936	
DD-112	Ludlow	Union Iron Works	7 January 1918	9 June 1918	23 December 1918	Scrapped by US, 10 March 1931	
DD-113	Rathburne	William Cramp & Sons	12 July 1917	27 December 1917	24 June 1918	Scrapped by US, November 1946	
DD-114	Talbot	William Cramp & Sons	12 July 1917	20 February 1918	20 July 1918	Scrapped by US, 30 January 1946	
DD-115	Waters	William Cramp & Sons	26 July 1917	3 March 1918	8 August 1918	Scrapped by US, 10 May 1946	
DD-116	Dent	William Cramp & Sons	30 August 1917	23 March 1918	9 September 1918	Scrapped by US, 13 June 1946	
DD-117	Dorsey	William Cramp & Sons	18 September 1917	9 April 1918	16 September 1918	Hulk was destroyed, 1 January 1946	
DD-118	Lea	William Cramp & Sons	18 September 1917	29 April 1918	2 October 1918	Scrapped by US, 30 November 1946	
DD-119	Lamberton	Newport News Shipbuilding	1 October 1917	30 March 1918	22 August 1918	Scrapped by US, 9 May 1947	
DD-120	Radford	Newport News Shipbuilding	2 October 1917	5 April 1918	30 September 1918	Sunk as target, 5 August 1936	
DD-121	Montgomery	Newport News Shipbuilding	2 October 1917	5 April 1918	30 September 1918	Scrapped by US, 11 March 1946	
DD-122	Breese	Newport News Shipbuilding	10 November 1917	11 May 1918	23 October 1918	Scrapped by US, 16 May 1946	
DD-123	Gamble	Newport News Shipbuilding	12 November 1917	11 May 1918	29 November 1918	Sunk by scuttling, 16 July 1945	
DD-124	Ramsay	Newport News Shipbuilding	21 December 1917	8 June 1918	15 February 1919	Scrapped by US, 21 November 1946	
DD-125	Tattnall	New York Shipbuilding	1 December 1917	5 September 1918	26 June 1919	Scrapped by US, 17 October 1946	
DD-126	Badger	New York Shipbuilding	9 January 1918	24 August 1918	29 May 1919	Scrapped by US, 30 November 1945	
DD-127	Twiggs	New York Shipbuilding	23 January 1918	28 September 1918	28 July 1919	Scrapped by UK, 26 July 1951	
DD-128	Babbitt	New York Shipbuilding	19 February 1918	30 September 1918	24 October 1919	Scrapped by US, 5 June 1946	
DD-129	DeLong	New York Shipbuilding	21 February 1918	29 October 1918	20 September 1919	Scrapped, 25 September 1922	
DD-130	Jacob Jones	New York Shipbuilding	21 February 1918	20 November 1918	20 October 1919	Sunk in battle, 28 February 1942	
DD-131	Buchanan	Bath Iron Works	29 June 1918	2 January 1919	20 January 1919	Destroyed during St. Nazaire Raid, 29 March 1942	
DD-132	Aaron Ward	Bath Iron Works	11 August 1918	10 April 1919	21 April 1919	Scrapped by US, 1947	
DD-133	Hale	Bath Iron Works	7 October 1918	29 May 1919	12 June 1919	Scrapped by UK, September 1944	
DD-134	Crowninshield	Bath Iron Works	5 November 1918	24 July 1919	6 August 1919	Scrapped by UK, 23 June 1949	
DD-135	Tillman	Charleston Navy Yard	29 July 1918	7 July 1918	10 April 1921	Scrapped by UK, 24 July 1945	
DD-136	Boggs	Mare Island Navy Yard	15 November 1917	25 April 1918	23 September 1918	Scrapped by US, 27 November 1946	
DD-137	Kilty	Mare Island Navy Yard	15 December 1917	25 April 1918	17 December 1918	Scrapped by US, 26 August 1946	
DD-138	Kennison	Mare Island Navy Yard	14 February 1918	8 June 1918	2 April 1919	Scrapped by US, 18 November 1946	
DD-139	Ward	Mare Island Navy Yard	15 May 1918	1 June 1918	24 July 1918	Sunk in battle, 7 December 1944	
DD-140	Claxton	Mare Island Navy Yard	25 April 1918	14 January 1919	13 September 1919	Scrapped by UK, 26 June 1944	
DD-141	Hamilton	Mare Island Navy Yard	8 June 1918	15 January 1919	7 November 1919	Scrapped by US, 21 November 1946	
DD-142	Tarbell	William Cramp & Sons	31 December 1917	28 May 1918	27 November 1918	Scrapped by US, 30 November 1945	
DD-143	Yarnall	William Cramp & Sons	12 February 1918	19 June 1918	29 November 1918	Scrapped by UK, 23 August 1952	
DD-144	Upshur	William Cramp & Sons	19 February 1918	4 July 1918	23 December 1918	Scrapped by US, April 1948	
DD-145	Greer	William Cramp & Sons	24 February 1918	1 August 1918	31 December 1918	Scrapped by US, 30 November 1945	
DD-146	Elliot	William Cramp & Sons	23 February 1918	4 July 1918	25 January 1919	Scrapped by US, 29 January 1946	
DD-147	Roper	William Cramp & Sons	19 March 1918	17 August 1918	15 February 1919	Scrapped by US, 31 March 1946	
DD-148	Breckinridge	William Cramp & Sons	11 March 1918	17 August 1918	27 February 1919	Scrapped by US, 31 October 1946	
DD-149	Barney	William Cramp & Sons	26 March 1918	5 September 1918	14 March 1919	Scrapped by US, 13 October 1946	
DD-150	Blakeley	William Cramp & Sons	26 March 1918	19 September 1918	8 May 1919	Scrapped by US, 30 November 1945	
DD-151	Biddle	William Cramp & Sons	22 April 1918	3 October 1918	22 April 1919	Scrapped by US, 3 December 1946	
DD-152	Du Pont	William Cramp & Sons	2 May 1918	22 October 1918	30 April 1919	Scrapped by US, 12 March 1947	
DD-153	Bernadou	William Cramp & Sons	4 June 1918	7 November 1918	19 May 1919	Scrapped by US, 30 November 1945	
DD-154	Ellis	William Cramp & Sons	8 July 1918	30 November 1918	7 June 1919	Scrapped by US, 17 July 1947	
DD-155	Cole	William Cramp & Sons	25 June 1918	11 January 1919	19 June 1919	Scrapped by US, 6 October 1947	
DD-156	J. Fred Talbott	William Cramp & Sons	8 July 1918	14 December 1918	30 June 1919	Scrapped by US, 22 December 1946	
DD-157	Dickerson	New York Shipbuilding	25 May 1918	12 March 1919	3 September 1919	Sunk by scuttling following an attack, 4 April 1945	
DD-158	Leary	New York Shipbuilding	6 March 1918	18 December 1918	5 December 1919	Sunk in battle, 24 December 1943	
DD-159	Schenck	New York Shipbuilding	26 March 1918	23 April 1919	30 October 1919	Scrapped by US, 25 November 1946	
DD-160	Herbert	New York Shipbuilding	9 April 1918	8 May 1919	21 November 1919	Scrapped by US, 23 May 1946	
DD-161	Palmer	Fore River Shipyard	29 May 1918	18 August 1918	22 November 1918	Sunk in battle, 7 January 1945	
DD-162	Thatcher	Fore River Shipyard	8 June 1918	31 August 1918	14 January 1919	Scrapped by UK, 1946	
DD-163	Walker	Fore River Shipyard	19 June 1918	14 September 1918	31 January 1919	Sunk by scuttling, 28 December 1941	
DD-164	Crosby	Fore River Shipyard	23 June 1918	28 September 1918	24 January 1919	Scrapped by US, 23 May 1946	
DD-165	Meredith	Fore River Shipyard	26 June 1918	22 September 1918	29 January 1919	Scrapped by US, 29 September 1936	
DD-166	Bush	Fore River Shipyard	4 July 1918	27 October 1918	19 February 1919	Scrapped by US, 8 September 1936	
DD-167	Cowell	Fore River Shipyard	15 July 1918	23 November 1918	17 March 1919	Scrapped by UK, 28 February 1949	
DD-168	Maddox	Fore River Shipyard	20 July 1918	27 October 1918	10 March 1919	Scrapped by UK, 16 September 1952	
DD-169	Foote	Fore River Shipyard	7 August 1918	14 December 1918	21 March 1919	Scrapped by UK, 14 May 1949	
DD-170	Kalk	Fore River Shipyard	4 March 1917	21 December 1918	29 March 1919	Scrapped by UK, 1945	
DD-171	Burns	Union Iron Works	15 April 1918	4 July 1918	7 August 1919	Scrapped by US, 22 April 1932	
DD-172	Anthony	Union Iron Works	18 April 1918	10 August 1918	19 June 1919	Sunk as target, 22 July 1937	
DD-173	Sproston	Union Iron Works	20 April 1918	10 August 1918	12 July 1919	Sunk as a target, 20 July 1937	
DD-174	Rizal	Union Iron Works	26 June 1918	21 September 1918	28 May 1919	Scrapped by US, 25 February 1932	
DD-175	Mackenzie	Union Iron Works	4 July 1918	29 September 1918	25 July 1919	Scrapped by Canada, 4 June 1945	
DD-176	Renshaw	Union Iron Works	8 May 1918	21 September 1918	31 July 1919	Scrapped by US, 29 September 1936	
DD-177	O'Bannon	Union Iron Works	12 November 1918	28 February 1919	27 August 1919	Scrapped by US, 29 September 1936	
DD-178	Hogan	Union Iron Works	25 November 1918	12 April 1919	1 October 1919	Sunk as target, 8 November 1945	
DD-179	Howard	Union Iron Works	9 December 1918	26 April 1919	29 January 1920	Scrapped by US, 14 June 1946	
DD-180	Stansbury	Union Iron Works	9 December 1918	16 May 1919	8 January 1920	Scrapped by US, 25 January 1947	
DD-181	Hopewell	Newport News Shipbuilding	19 January 1918	8 June 1918	22 March 1919	Sunk in battle, 19 August 1941	
DD-182	Thomas	Newport News Shipbuilding	23 March 1918	4 July 1918	25 April 1919	Scrapped by UK, 28 February 1949	
DD-183	Haraden	Newport News Shipbuilding	30 March 1918	4 July 1918	7 June 1919	Scrapped by UK, August 1945	
DD-184	Abbot	Newport News Shipbuilding	5 April 1918	4 July 1918	19 July 1919	Scrapped by UK, 1947	
DD-185	Bagley	Newport News Shipbuilding	11 May 1918	19 October 1918	27 August 1919	Scrapped by UK, 1945	
