= List of ship commissionings in 1919 =

The list of ship commissionings in 1919 is a chronological list of ships commissioned in 1919. In cases where no official commissioning ceremony was held, the date of service entry may be used instead.

Date	Operator	Ship	Class and type	Notes	Ref
24 January	United States Navy	Harding	Wickes-class destroyer		
15 February	United States Navy	Ramsay	Wickes-class destroyer		
20 February	United States Navy	Hazelwood	Wickes-class destroyer		
25 February	United States Navy	McKean	Wickes-class destroyer		
1 March	United States Navy	Williams	Wickes-class destroyer		
8 March	United States Navy	Gridley	Wickes-class destroyer		
24 March	United States Navy	Idaho	New Mexico-class battleship		
18 April	United States Navy	Crane	Wickes-class destroyer		
21 April	United States Navy	Aaron Ward	Wickes-class destroyer	under command of Cmdr. Raymond A. Spruance	
15 May	United States Navy	Ingraham	Wickes-class destroyer		
26 May	United States Navy	Hart	Wickes-class destroyer		
26 June	United States Navy	Tattnall	Wickes-class destroyer		
19 July	United States Navy	Abbot	Wickes-class destroyer	under command of Lieutenant Commander William N. Richardson Jr.	
13 October	United States Navy	Patoka	Patoka-class oiler		
15 November	United States Navy	Ramapo	Patoka-class oiler		
unknown date	United States Coast and Geodetic Survey	Audwin	survey vessel	former section patrol vessel	
unknown date	United States Bureau of Fisheries	USFS Eider	passenger-cargo ship	former fishing vessel Idaho commissioned in the summer of 1919 as a cargo liner	
