= List of shipwrecks in 1942 =

The list of shipwrecks in 1942 includes all ships sunk, foundered, grounded, or otherwise lost during 1942.

table of contents
1942
Jan	Feb	Mar	Apr
May	Jun	Jul	Aug
Sep	Oct	Nov	Dec
Unknown date

== Unknown date ==
List of shipwrecks: Unknown date 1942
Ship	State	Description
Boschdijk	Kriegsmarine	World War II: The target ship was sunk.
Cretehawser	United Kingdom	World War II: The 125-foot (38 m) concrete tugboat, was bombed and holed in the River Wear, she was towed up river and beached opposite the old Hylton Colliery sometime in 1942.
LAS 21	Spanish Navy	The DAR 1-class anti-submarine motor launch was lost sometime in 1942.
Norman H. Davis	United States	The dredger was destroyed by fire at Key West, Florida.
HMT Senateur Duhamel	Royal Navy	The naval trawler collided with USS Semmes (United States Navy) in the Atlantic Ocean off Cape Lookout, North Carolina, United States and sank on 6 April or 6 May 1942. Survivors were rescued by USS Semmes.
Shch-304	Soviet Navy	World War II: The Shchuka-class submarine struck a mine and sank in the Baltic Sea sometime after 29 October.
Sisunthon Nawa	United Kingdom	The cargo ship was reported missing in early 1942. Presumed captured or sunk by the Japanese.
Trabajador	United States Navy	The tug was sunk, probably by Japanese artillery, off Corregidor, Philippines. She was salvaged post-war and served under the name Resolute into the late 1970s.
HMS Triumph	Royal Navy	World War II: The T-class submarine disappeared sometime between 30 December 1941 and 9 January 1942 with the loss of all 59 crew. She possibly struck a mine and sank in the Mediterranean Sea.
Unnamed	United States	The barge foundered in the Gulf of Mexico (30°00′N 87°21′W) southwest of Pensacola, Florida.
Unknown (formerly Cretecove)	German Army	The concrete-hulled barge was wrecked at Røssøyvågen, Norway.

== See also ==
- List of shipwrecks
