= List of ship decommissionings in 1944 =

The list of ship decommissionings in 1944 is a chronological list of all ships decommissioned in 1944. In cases where no official decommissioning ceremony was held, the date of withdrawal from service may be used instead. For ships lost at sea, see list of shipwrecks in 1944 instead.

| | Operator | Ship | Class and type | Fate | Other notes |
|---|---|---|---|---|---|
| 23 February | Royal Navy | Montgomery | Wickes-class destroyer | Placed in reserve and removed from the effective list | Scrapped in 1945 |
| 22 June | Royal Canadian Navy | Mansfield | Wickes-class destroyer | Paid off | |
| 16 July | Royal Navy | Richmond | Wickes-class destroyer | Transferred to the Soviet Navy | Became Jivoochyi |
| 22 August | Kriegsmarine | Schnelles Geleitboot 1 (SG 1) | Sans Souci-class escort vessel | returned to France | renamed Beautemps-Beaupré |
| 22 August | Kriegsmarine | Schnelles Geleitboot 4 (SG 4) | Sans Souci-class escort vessel | returned to France | renamed La Perouse |
| August | Royal Canadian Navy | St. Clair | Wickes-class destroyer | Sold for scrap | |
| August | (Nazi Germany) Luftwaffe | Imelmann | Karl Meyer-class seaplane tender | Interned in Spain | |
| August | (Nazi Germany) Luftwaffe | Max Stinsky | Karl Meyer-class | Interned in Spain | |
| 30 September | Royal Navy | Nabob | Bogue-class escort carrier | Used for spares, converted for commercial use | Became merchant ship Nabob (United Kingdom) |
| 5 October | United States Navy | Marcasite | Patrol yacht | Converted for commercial use | Renamed Commando |
