= List of ship decommissionings in 1931 =

The list of ship decommissionings in 1931 is a chronological list of ships decommissioned in 1931. In cases where no official decommissioning ceremony was held, the date of withdrawal from service may be used instead. For ships lost at sea, see list of shipwrecks in 1931 instead.

Date	Operator	Ship	Class and type	Fate and other notes	Ref
31 January	United States Navy	USS Luce	Wickes-class destroyer	sold for scrap	
16 February	United States Navy	USS Florida	Florida-class battleship	Scrapped under London Naval Treaty of 1930	
24 March	United States Navy	USS Lansdale	Wickes-class destroyer	Scrapped	
May (unknown date)	Spanish Navy	Proserpina	Furor-class destroyer	Scrapped 1931	
1 June	United States Navy	USS Hart	Wickes-class destroyer	Scrapped	
June	Spanish Navy	Río de la Plata	Protected cruiser	Hulked since 1921; scrapped 1932	
31 August	Spanish Navy	Extremadura	Protected cruiser	Scrapped 1932	
20 October	Spanish Navy	Bustamante	Bustamante-class destroyer	Scrapped	
5 December	Spanish Navy	Emperador Carlos V	Armored cruiser	Hulked since 1923; stricken 1932; scrapped 1933	
17 December	Spanish Navy	Cosme García	A-class submarine	Scrapped	
