= List of ship decommissionings in 1922 =

The list of ship decommissionings in 1922 is a chronological list of ships decommissioned in 1922. In cases where no official decommissioning ceremony was held, the date of withdrawal from service may be used instead. For ships lost at sea, see list of shipwrecks in 1922 instead.

Date	Operator	Ship	Class and type	Fate and other notes	Ref
7 June	United States Navy	Champlin	Wickes-class destroyer	sunk in trials 1936	
7 June	United States Navy	Dyer	Wickes-class destroyer	sold for scrap	
7 June	United States Navy	Mugford	Wickes-class destroyer	sold for scrap	
9 June	United States Navy	Radford	Wickes-class destroyer	in reserve until sunk	
16 June	United States Navy	McKee	Wickes-class destroyer	sold for scrap	
17 June	United States Navy	Aaron Ward	Wickes-class destroyer	in reserve at San Diego until recommissioned in 1930	
17 June	United States Navy	Ringgold	Wickes-class destroyer	transferred to the Royal Navy in 1940 as HMS Newark	
19 June	United States Navy	Stevens	Wickes-class destroyer	sold for scrap	
21 June	United States Navy	Bell	Wickes-class destroyer	sold for scrap	
22 June	United States Navy	Gridley	Wickes-class destroyer	sold for scrap	
26 June	United States Navy	Stribling	Wickes-class destroyer	sunk as a target	
29 June	United States Navy	Ingraham	Wickes-class destroyer	sold for scrap	
30 June	United States Navy	Kimberly	Wickes-class destroyer	sold for scrap	
1 July	United States Navy	Harding	Wickes-class destroyer	sold for scrap	
1 July	United States Navy	Murray	Wickes-class destroyer	sold for scrap	
1 July	United States Navy	Israel	Wickes-class destroyer	sold for scrap	
5 July	United States Navy	Abbot	Wickes-class destroyer	at Philadelphia Navy Yard until recommissioned in 1940	
25 July	United States Navy	A-3	Plunger-class submarine	ex-Grampus; decommissioned and used as a target ship	
7 August	United States Navy	Abel P. Upshur	Clemson-class destroyer	at Philadelphia Navy Yard until in 1928	
5 December	United States Navy	T-1	AA-1-class submarine	ex-AA-1; decommissioned and sold for scrap	
