= List of ship decommissionings in 1930 =

The list of ship decommissionings in 1930 is a chronological list of ships decommissioned in 1930. In cases where no official decommissioning ceremony was held, the date of withdrawal from service may be used instead. For ships lost at sea, see list of shipwrecks in 1930 instead.

Date	Operator	Ship	Class and type	Fate and other notes	Ref
19 March	United States Navy	Maury	Wickes-class destroyer	Scrapped	
1 May	United States Navy	Mahan	Wickes-class destroyer	Scrapped	
24 May	United States Navy	Ludlow	Wickes-class destroyer	Scrapped	
2 June	Regia Marina	F1	F-class submarine	Scrapped	
2 June	Regia Marina	F10	F-class submarine	Scrapped	
2 June	Regia Marina	F19	F-class submarine	Scrapped	
1 October	Regia Marina	F21	F-class submarine	Scrapped	
5 November	United States Navy	Abel P. Upshur	Clemson-class destroyer	Transferred to the United States Coast Guard	
15 November	United States Navy	Hazelwood	Wickes-class destroyer	Scrapped	
Unknown date	Spanish Navy	Cadarso	Bustamante-class destroyer	Scrapped	
