= List of ship decommissionings in 1940 =

The list of ship decommissionings in 1940 is a chronological list of ships decommissioned in 1940. In cases where no official decommissioning ceremony was held, the date of withdrawal from service may be used instead. Notably, several destroyers were decommissioned by the United States Navy during 1940 for immediate transfer to the Royal Navy under the Destroyers for Bases Agreement between the two nations. For ships lost at sea, see list of shipwrecks in 1940 instead.

Date	Operator	Ship	Class and type	Fate and other notes	Ref
8 June	Spanish Navy	B-3	B-class submarine	Scrapped	
9 September	United States Navy	Aaron Ward	Wickes-class destroyer	decommissioned at Halifax and transferred to the Royal Navy	
9 September	United States Navy	Abel P. Upshur	Clemson-class destroyer	decommissioned at Halifax and transferred to the Royal Navy as HMS Clare	
23 September	United States Navy	Abbot	Wickes-class destroyer	decommissioned at Halifax and transferred to the Royal Navy	
11 October	United States Navy	Evans	Wickes-class destroyer	transferred to the Royal Navy	
11 October	United States Navy	Philip	Wickes-class destroyer	transferred to the Royal Navy	
11 October	United States Navy	Wickes	Wickes-class destroyer	transferred to the Royal Navy	
26 November	United States Navy	Fairfax	Wickes-class destroyer	transferred to the Royal Navy	
26 November	United States Navy	Sigourney	Wickes-class destroyer	transferred to the Royal Navy	
