= List of ship decommissionings in 1938 =

The list of ship decommissionings in 1938 is a chronological list of ships decommissioned in 1938. In cases where no official decommissioning ceremony was held, the date of withdrawal from service may be used instead. For ships lost at sea, see list of shipwrecks in 1938 instead.

Date	Operator	Ship	Pennant	Class and type	Fate and other notes
23 September	United States Navy	USS Taylor	DD-94	Wickes-class destroyer	served as a damage control hulk, later scrapped

== Bibliography ==
- Silverstone, Paul H. (2006). The New Navy 1883–1922. The U.S. Navy Warship Series. New York: Routledge. ISBN 978-0-415-97871-2.
