= USS Crane =

Wickes-class destroyer

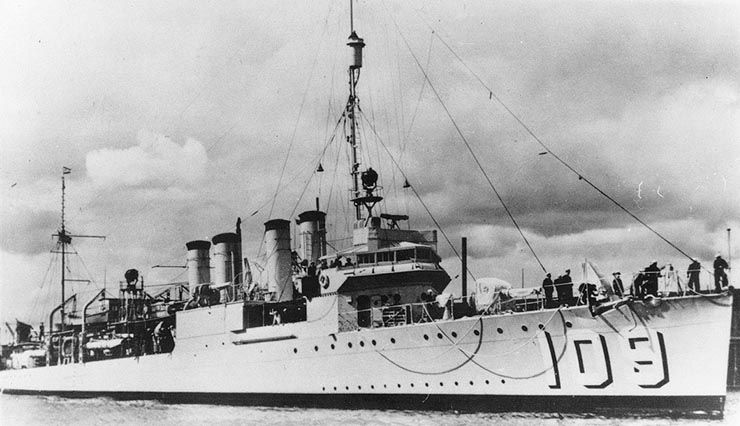
- USS Crane underway

History

United States
- Name: Crane
- Namesake: William M. Crane
- Builder: Union Iron Works, San Francisco, California
- Laid down: 7 January 1918
- Launched: 4 July 1918
- Commissioned: 18 April 1919
- Decommissioned: 7 June 1922
- Recommissioned: 18 December 1939
- Decommissioned: 14 November 1945
- Stricken: 19 December 1945
- Fate: Sold 1 November 1946

General characteristics
- Class & type: Wickes-class destroyer
- Displacement: 1,060 tons
- Length: 314 ft 5 in (95.8 m)
- Beam: 31 ft 9 in (9.7 m)
- Draft: 8 ft 6 in (2.6 m)
- Speed: 35 knots (65 km/h)
- Complement: 100 officers and enlisted
- Armament: 4 × 4 in (102 mm)/50 guns; 12 × 21 in (533 mm) torpedo tubes

USS Crane (DD-109) was a Wickes-class destroyer in the United States Navy. She is named for naval officer William M. Crane.

Crane was launched on 4 July 1918 by Bethlehem Shipbuilding Corporation, Union Iron Works, San Francisco, California; sponsored by Mrs. M. McGuire; and commissioned on 18 April 1919.

== Service history ==
Clearing San Francisco 21 April 1919, Crane arrived at Newport, Rhode Island, 13 May. She sailed for duty in European waters on 5 June, visiting ports in England and France and joining the escort for George Washington carrying President Woodrow Wilson to the peace conference. Returning to New York on 27 July, Crane was assigned to the Pacific Fleet, and arrived at San Francisco on 1 September. Here she participated in the naval review, during which she was visited by Secretary of the Navy Josephus Daniels on 4 September. After operations off the coast of Washington, Crane was placed in reserve at San Diego 26 January 1920, participating in occasional maneuvers until decommissioned on 7 June 1922, at San Diego.

Recommissioned on 18 December 1939, Crane joined the Neutrality Patrol in the Pacific Ocean. She continued patrols and provided training for naval reservists and armed guard crews until the outbreak of World War II.

=== World War II ===
Crane remained on the west coast on anti-submarine patrol, local escort duty, training exercises, and screening duty for amphibious exercises until 22 April 1944, when she was assigned to the West Coast Sound Training School. After the war she departed San Diego on 2 October 1945, arrived at Philadelphia on 19 October; was decommissioned on 14 November 1945; and sold on 1 November 1946.
