= List of ship commissionings in 1922 =

The list of ship commissionings in 1922 is a chronological list of ships commissioned in 1922. In cases where no official commissioning ceremony was held, the date of service entry may be used instead.

	Operator	Ship	Class and type	Pennant	Other notes
1 January	United States Navy	Rapidan	Patoka-class oiler	AO-18	
7 January	United States Navy	AA-2	AA-1-class submarine	SF-2	
11 January	Spanish Navy	B-1	B-class submarine	B-1	
13 January	United States Navy	Sepulga	Patoka-class oiler	AO-20	
20 March	United States Navy	Langley	Experimental aircraft carrier	CV-1	Former USS Jupiter (AC-3)
28 March	Royal Netherlands Navy	K II	K II-class submarine	K II	
1 June	Spanish Navy	B-2	B-class submarine	B-2	
25 July	Royal Netherlands Navy	Van Meerlant	Douwe Aukes-class minelayer	M 36	
5 August	Royal Australian Navy	Adelaide	Town-class cruiser		
24 August	Spanish Navy	B-3	B-class submarine	B-2	
5 September	Royal Netherlands Navy	K VII	K V-class submarine	K VII	
15 September	Royal Netherlands Navy	K VIII	K VIII-class submarine	K VIII	
2 November	Royal Netherlands Navy	Douwe Aukes	Douwe Aukes-class minelayer	ML 1	

== Bibliography ==
- Norman, Friedman (1985). "United States of America". In Gray, Randal (ed.). Conway's All the World's Fighting Ships 1906–1921. Annapolis, Maryland: Naval Institute Press. pp. 105–133. ISBN 0-85177-245-5.
