= Naval Base Borneo =

1945 World War II Base in Borneo

Borneo
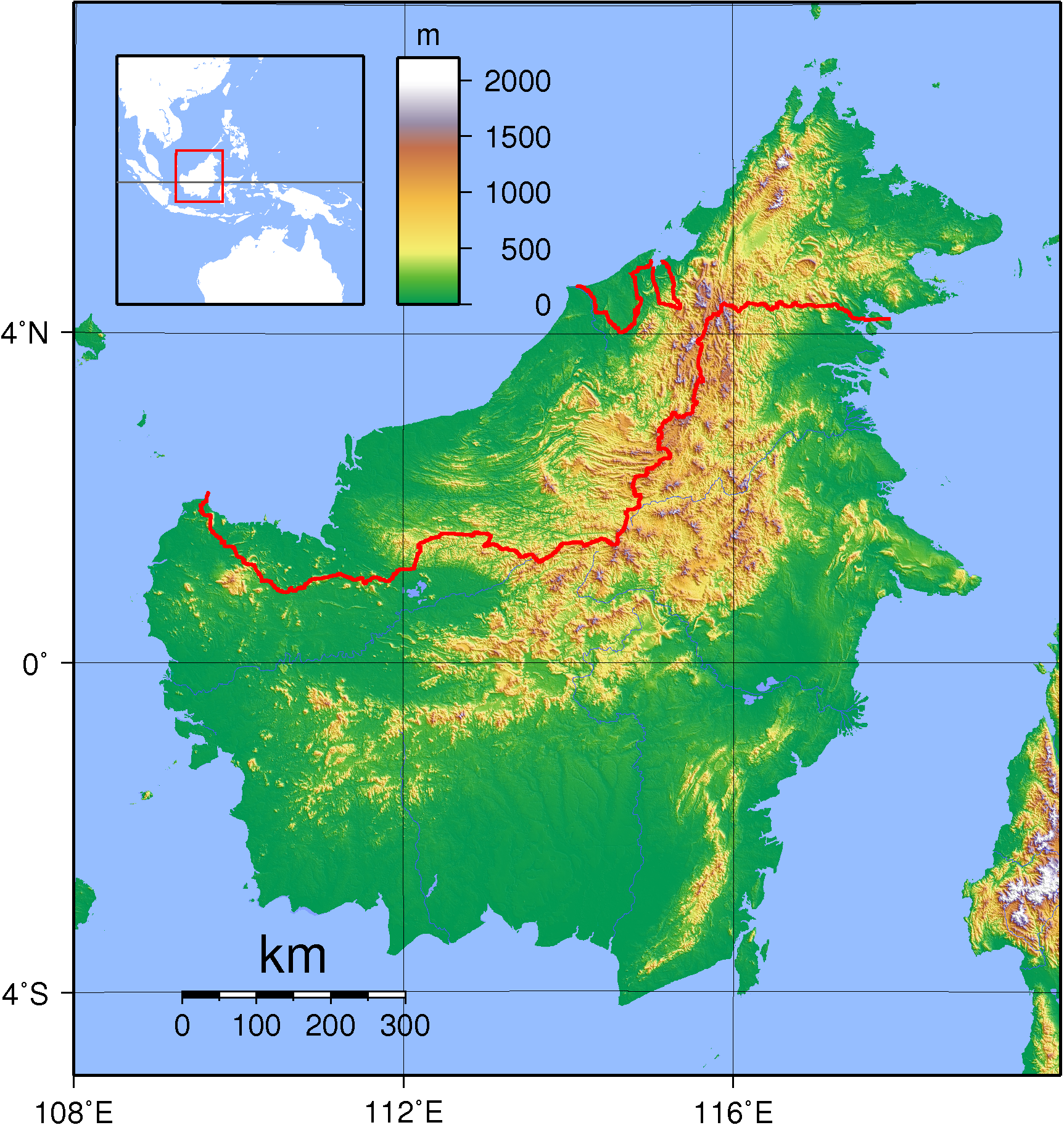
- Topography of Borneo
- Interactive map of Borneo

Geography
- Location: Southeast Asia
- Coordinates: 0°N 114°E
- Archipelago: Greater Sunda Islands
- Indonesia
- Malaysia

Naval Base Borneo and Naval Base Dutch East Indies was a number of United States Navy Advance Bases and bases of the Australian Armed Forces in Borneo and Dutch East Indies during World War II. At the start of the war, the island was divided in two: British Borneo and Dutch East Indies. Both fell to the Empire of Japan, Japan occupied British Borneo and the Dutch East Indies in 1942 until 1945.

== History ==
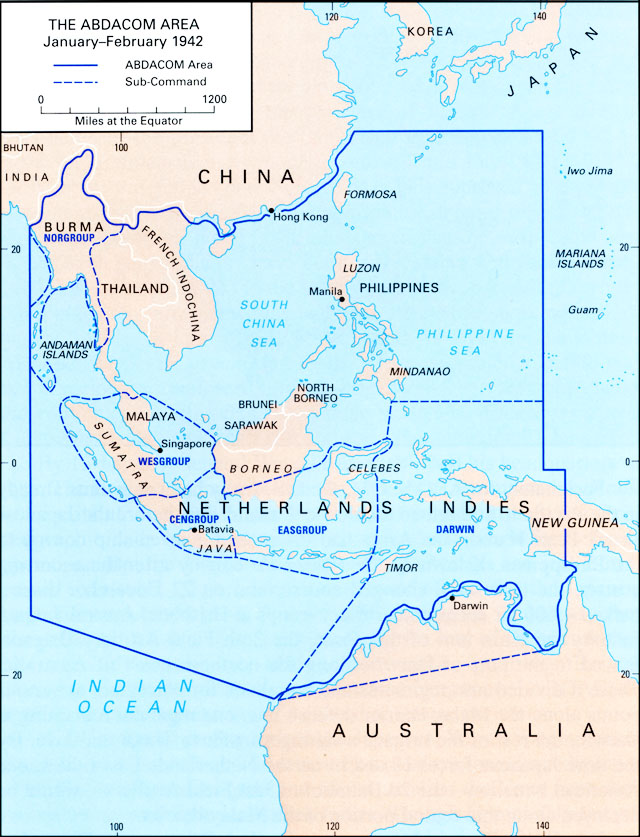
Map of the 1942 American-British-Dutch-Australian Command

To the north, the US Naval Base Philippines fell to Japan before Borneo in 1941 and 1942, as such many US Navy ships and submarines escaped the Philippines and traveled south to ports in Borneo and the Dutch East Indies. On 25 November 1941 knowing that hostile Japan actions in the Pacific was coming, Admiral Hart, commander of the Asiatic Fleet, moved Destroyer Division (DesDiv) 57 (USS Whipple, USS Alden, USS John D. Edwards and Edsall) with the destroyer tender USS Black Hawk, to Balikpapan, Borneo, so the whole fleet would not be at Manila Bay in the Philippines. As Japan advanced south into Borneo these vessels fled further south to form the new US Naval Bases in Australia. Some of the Royal Netherlands Navy vessels, like Netherlands submarines: HMAS K9 and HNLMS K VIII, also fled to bases in Australia. With the American-British-Dutch-Australian Command (ABDACOM) the Allies tried to limit the advance of Japan. ABDACOM did not have enough troops or supplies to carry out the mission. Japan viewed the Dutch East Indies as a prize for its vast quantities of natural resources. In 1941, the Dutch East Indies was a major producer of: rubber, oil, quinine, coffee, tea, cacao, coconut, sugar, pepper, and tobacco. Due to Japan's aggression in China and other places, the US put an oil embargo on Japan.

During the Borneo campaign in 1944 and 1945 the Allies both built new bases and used captured Japan bases for staging advances in Borneo and the Philippines. Many ports and cities held by Japan did not surrender until the end of the war. As the Allies won more battles and moved in on Japan, Japan moved many of the 1942 Prisoners of war, mostly British and Australian in the 1945 Sandakan Death Marches. Like the Bataan Death March of 1942, many died in the Marches.

Dutch East Indies became independent from the Netherlands and Japan on 27 December and is now the nation of Indonesia. British Borneo the northern parts of the island of Borneo, became the nation of Brunei on 1 January 1984 and parts became two states in Malaysia. For current base since 1949 see Indonesian Navy.

== Naval bases ==
- Naval Base Morotai, Major US base opened September 1944, staging action in Philippines. Fleet Post Office # 936.
  - Base at Morotai supported: Wama Airfield and Pitu Airfield.
- Naval Base Sanga-Sanga, on Tawi-Tawi Island, support Sanga-Sanga Airfield
- Naval Base Brunei Bay at Brunei Bay with Australian Army also to support Brunei Airfield
- Naval Base Tarakan at Tarakan with Australian forces, after Battle of Tarakan. Fleet Post Office # 1157
- Naval Base Balikpapan at Balikpapan, Fleet Post Office # 1156, used after fall of US naval bases in the Philippines, retaken in June 1945 in the Battle of Balikpapan
- Naval Base Batavia at Batavia, Java (now Jakarta) Fleet Post Office #1155 (lost March 1, 1942)
- Naval Base Banjermassin at Banjarmasin, Borneo Fleet Post Office #1158 (lost in Battle of Banjarmasin)
- Naval Base Samarinda, in 1942 ABDACOM operated from the port at Samarinda to support Samarinda Airfield
- Naval Base Java, in 1942, the US set up a port to deliver planes and bombers to Yogyakarta Airfield as part of ABDACOM.
  - Naval Base Sourabaya at Surabaya Java, Fleet Post Office # 3043
  - Naval Base Tjilatjap, also called Naval Base Cilacap at Cilacap Java, in 1942 ABDACOM operated from the port at Tjilatjap. Base supported Pasiran Airfield. The USS Langley (CV-1) was sunk on her way to deliver more planes to Tjilatjap.
- Saumlaki Seaplane Base in Saumlaki Bay used in 1942 by US Navy and Netherlands Naval Aviation. On Tanimbar Islands in Maluku province.
- Naval Base Kudat at Kudat, British North Borneo, Fleet Post Office # 3103
- Naval Base Kudat Brunei at Brunei, British North Borneo, Fleet Post Office # 3104 SF
- Naval Base Ceram Island at Seram Island, Fleet Post Office # 3135, support post war Boela Airfield, now Boela Airport
- Naval Base Talaud Island on Talaud Islands Fleet Post Office # 3124, post war base (Operation Gossipmonger was canceled)
- Naval Base Koepang at Kupang, Timor, Fleet Post Office # 3049, support post war Koepang Airfield
- Naval Base Manado at Manado, Celebes, Fleet Post Office # 3066, support post war Mapanget Airfield
- Naval Base Kendari at Kendari, Celebes leet Post Office # 3052, support post war Kendari Airfield
- Australian bases, with US support:
  - Naval Base Sandakan, at Sandakan Borneo Fleet Post Office # 3128, freed July 1, 1945, support Sandakan Airport
  - Naval base Labuan Island to support Timbalai Airfield, after Battle of Labuan
  - Naval Base Timor in Portuguese East Timor
- Naval Base Muara Island after Battle of North Borneo
- Naval Base Weston at Weston, Sabah, after Battle of North Borneo

== Dutch East Indies Fleet 1942 ==
The Netherlands had a fleet of vessels in Dutch East Indies in 1942, many were lost in the war and some fled to Australia. The fleet included: Light cruisers: HNLMS De Ruyter HNLMS Java and HNLMS Tromp. Destroyers: HNLMS Piet Hein, HNLMS Van Nes, HNLMS Van Ghent, HNLMS Kortenaer, HNLMS Banckert, and HNLMS Witte de With. Eight minelayers and minesweepers. Light cruiser HNLMS Sumatra. K VIII-class submarine K-VII, K-VIII, K-IX, K-X, K-XI, K-XII, K-XIII, K-XIV, K-XVI, K XVIII and O-XIX. Gunboat: HNLMS Soerabaja and light cruiser: HNLMS Evertsen. Submarine tender Zuiderkruis.
Major Dutch East Indies seaports included: Makassar, Tangerang, Batavia (Jakarta), Semarang Tegal and Surabaya.
The main base of the Dutch East Indies Fleet was at the Soerabaja Naval Base at Surabaya Java, supported by the Morokrembangan Seaplane Base with Dornier Do 24 seaplanes . Dutch Naval Base Tandjong Priok at Java was the main sub base.
The major Islands of the Dutch East Indies were:

- Borneo, invaded January 1942, at Balikpapan, Tarakan, Samarinda
- Sumatra, was invaded February 1942
- Java, was invaded February 1942
- Timor, was invaded February 1942
  - Koepang Seaplane Base on West Timor
- Celebes, now Sulawesi, was invaded in January 1942 at Manado and Kendari
  - Lake Tondano Seaplane Base
- East Nusa Tenggara and West Nusa Tenggara, invaded February 1942
- Maluku Islands, (Moluccas Islands was invaded in January 1942, including Ceram Island
- Dutch New Guinea in Western New Guinea, northern ports invaded, see US Naval Base New Guinea

== British Borneo ==
British Borneo bases lost in the war and occupied by Japan included: Port of Sandakan, Port of Muara and Temburon. The British Pacific Fleet's East Indies Fleet also porting in nearby Singapore Naval Base. The British South Pacific Fleet joined the 1942 ABDACOM and many of the British ships were lost in the war. Some ships retreated to British bases in the Indian Ocean, initially to Trincomalee, Ceylon, and then to Addu Atoll in the Maldives.

== POWs ==
As in other theaters of war Japan's treatment of POWs and civilians was very poor. Many were exhausted from hunger and disease. Many deaths were caused by the diversion of food, such as rice, to Japanese troops from the Dutch East Indies population. Between 4 and 10 million Indonesians from the Dutch East Indies were turned into Japan's forced labourers, called romusha. Four million died in the Dutch East Indies as a result of famine and forced labour.International Red Cross packages were not distributed to POWs. In the Dutch East Indies there were both massacres and executions of POWs:

- Bangka Island massacre
- Balikpapan massacre
- Laha massacre
- Pontianak incidents
- Sandakan Death Marches
- Parit Sulong Massacre
- Karoenga massacre on Tarakan Island in January 1942, coastal battery crew
- Menado, Celebes Island, January 1942, executions of 12 POWs
- Kertosono, Java Island, March 1942 executions of 9 POWs, Dutch marines
- Tjiater, Java Island, March 6, 1942 executions of 72 POWs
- Kalidjati Airfield massacre, Java Island, March 1942, British RAF ground personnel killed
- Samarinda, Borneo Island, March 1942 at airfield Samarinda II 13 KNIL Army POWs shot
- Long Nawang, Borneo Island, August 1942 Japan executed many refugees in Kampong, including all crew members from a Glenn Martin bomber and three crew-members from Dornier seaplane.
- Koetaradja II, Sumatra Island, March 1942, 56 POWs shot and dumped at sea.
- Bireuen, Sumatra Island, March 1942, 18 POWs shot at bridge. Four escaped to tell about the 18.
- Cargo ship Langkoeas lifeboats attacked by I-158
- Tanker Augustina massacre, Western Java Sea, 1942, lifeboat machine-gunned, only 2 survived.

== Gallery ==
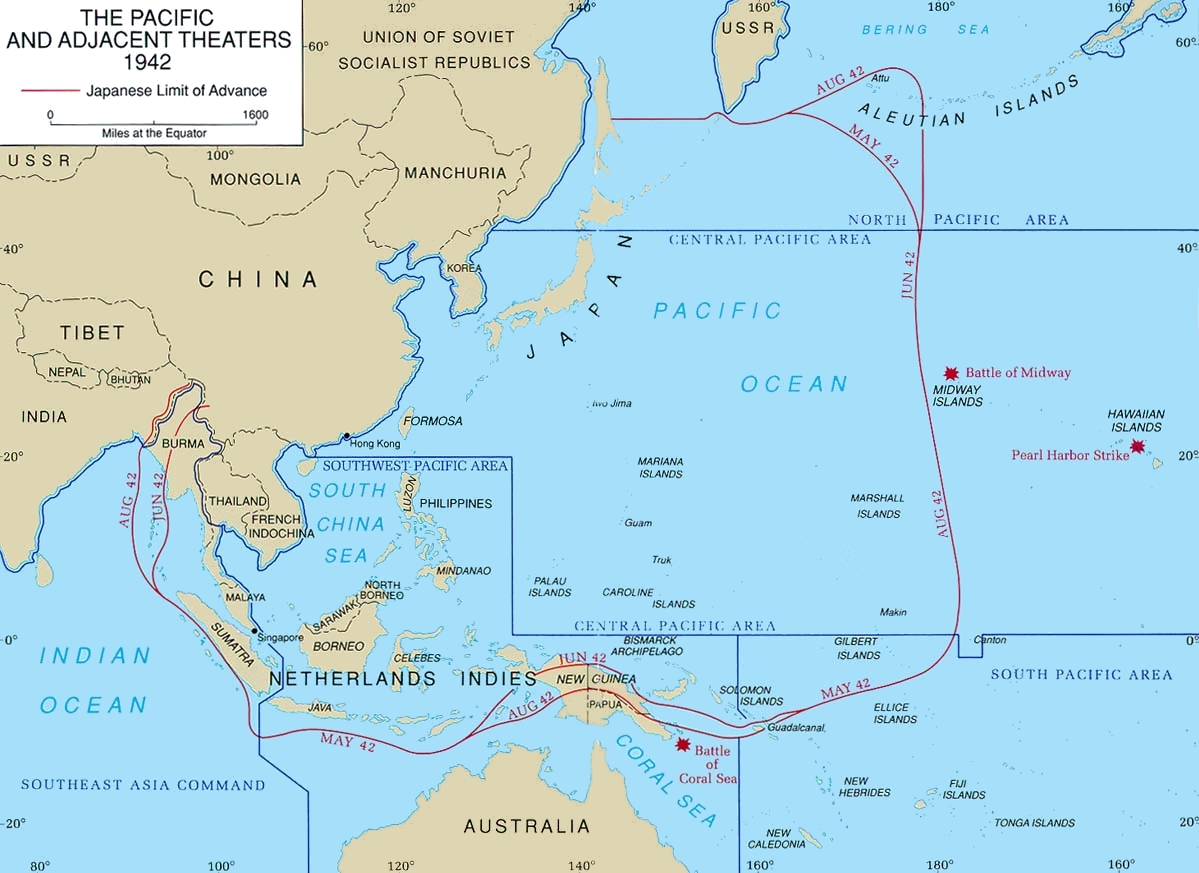
Pacific War Theater Areas map 1942

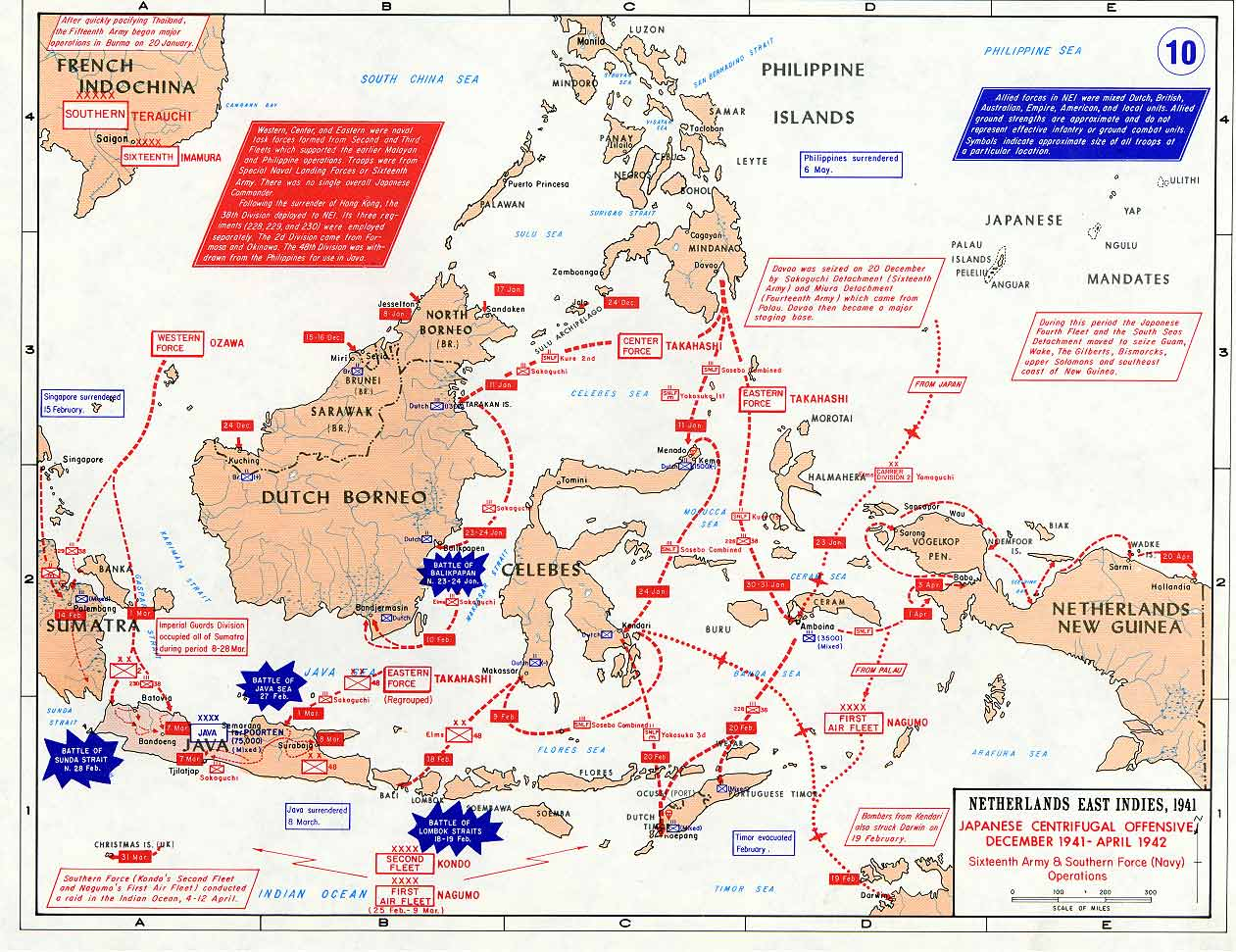
The Japanese lines of advance in the Dutch East Indies, Sarawak and North Borneo (British), and Portuguese Timor

The former Dutch East Indies (dark red) within the Empire of Japan (light red) at its furthest extent in late 1942

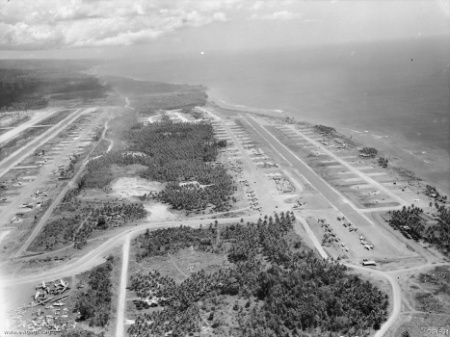
Wama Airstrip in April 1945

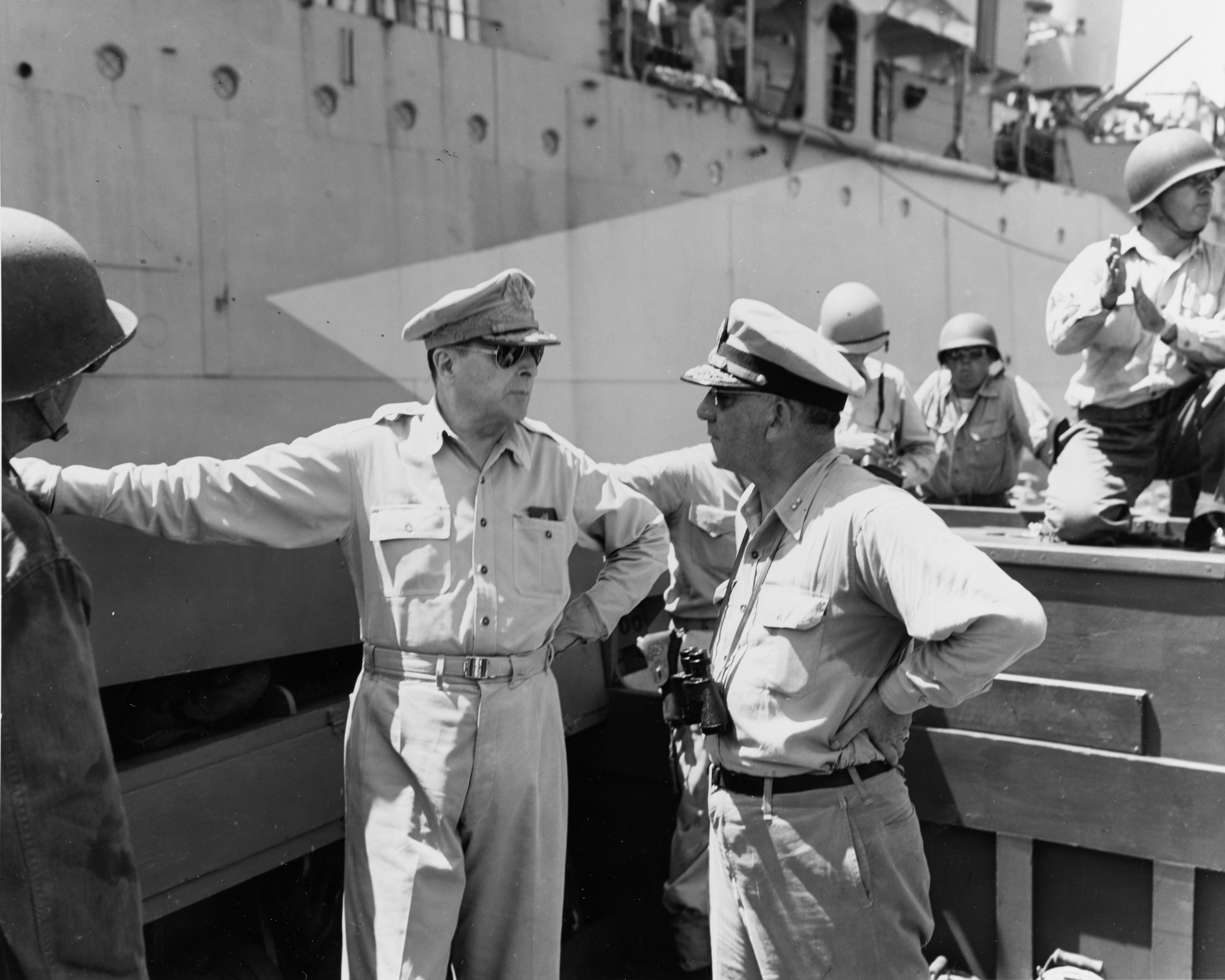
General MacArthur and Vice admiral Daniel E. Barbey leaving USS Nashville (CL-43) at Morotai on 15 September 1944

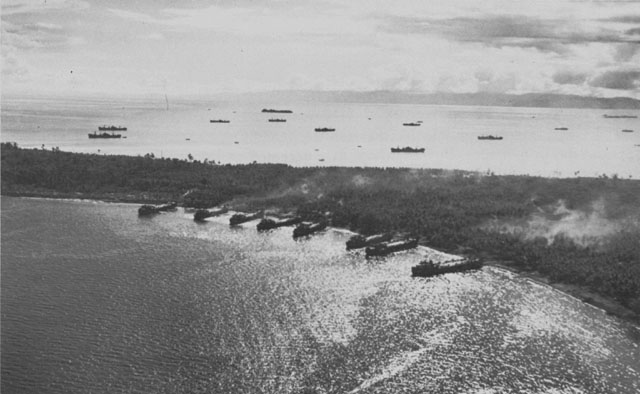
Landing Ship, Tanks unloading at Morotai

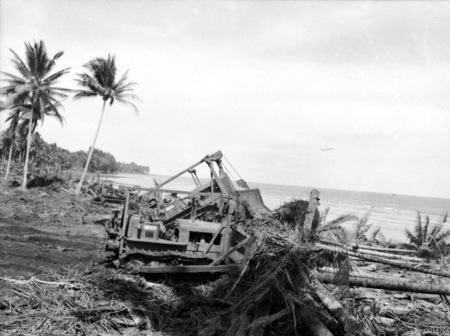
No 14 Airfield Construction Squadron RAAF Buldozers at Morotai

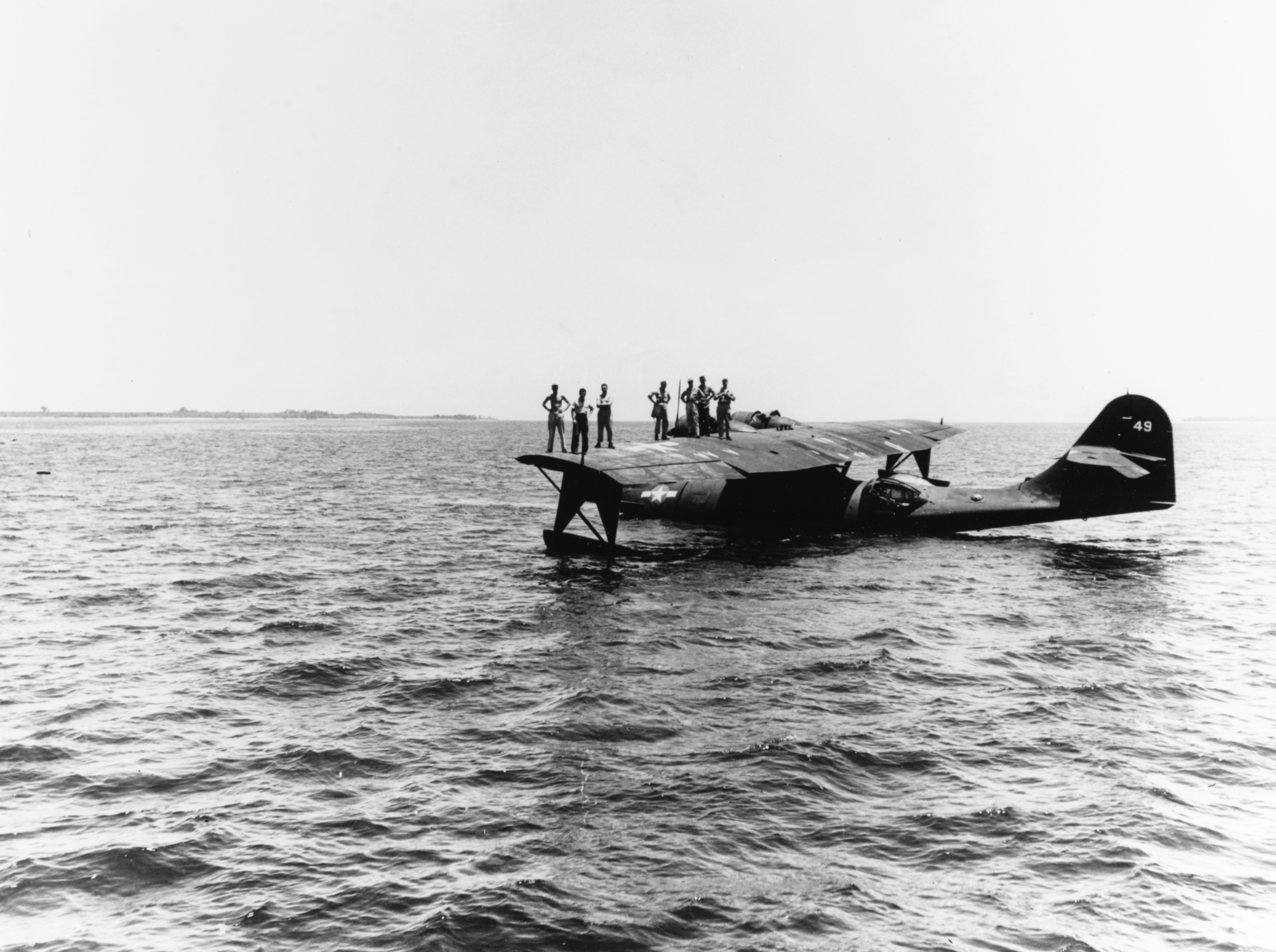
Consolidated PBY Catalina at Morotai in September 1944

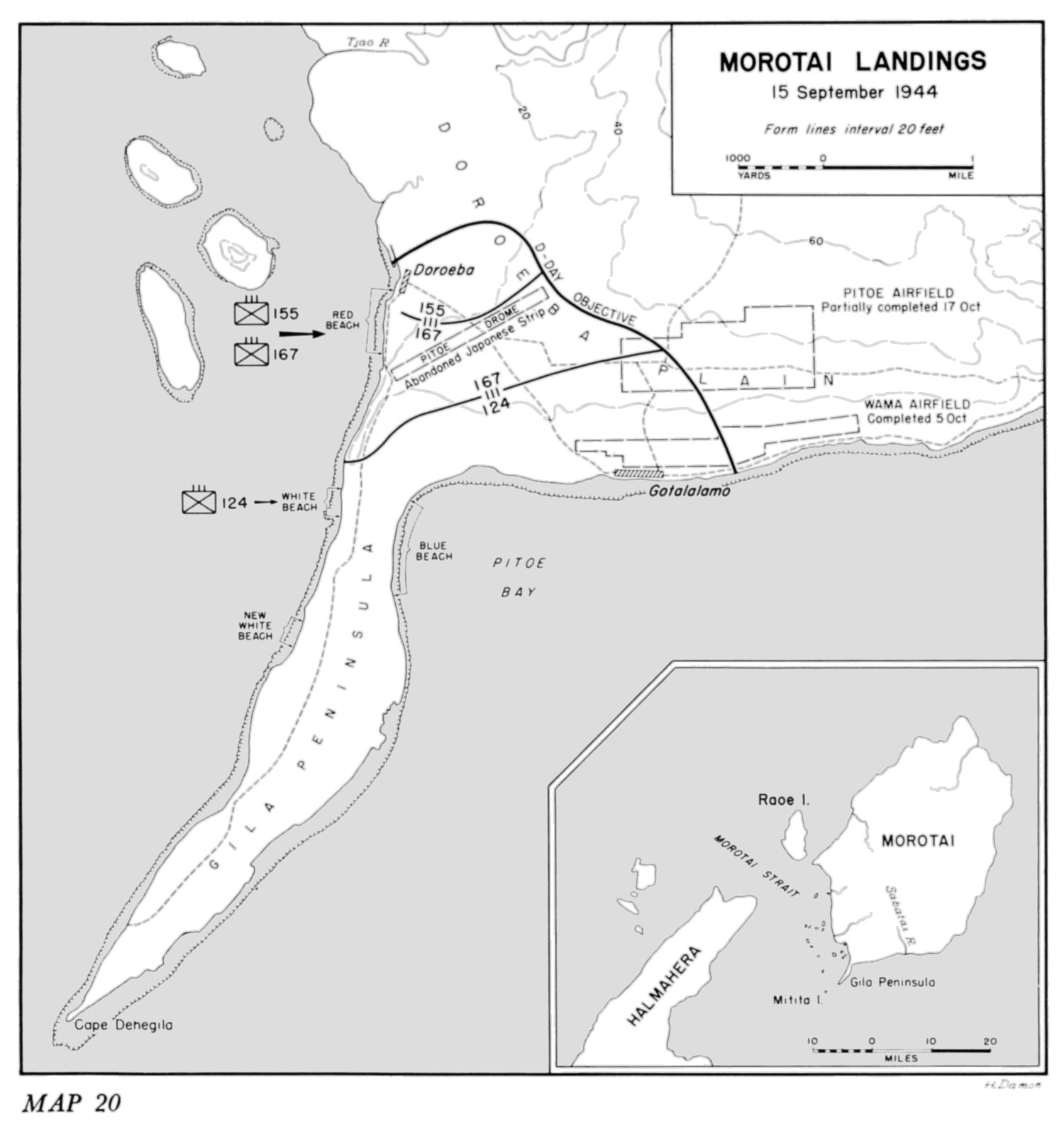
Morotai landings 15 September 1944, just before base construction started

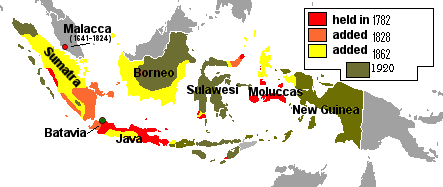
Territorial map with changes of the Dutch East Indies

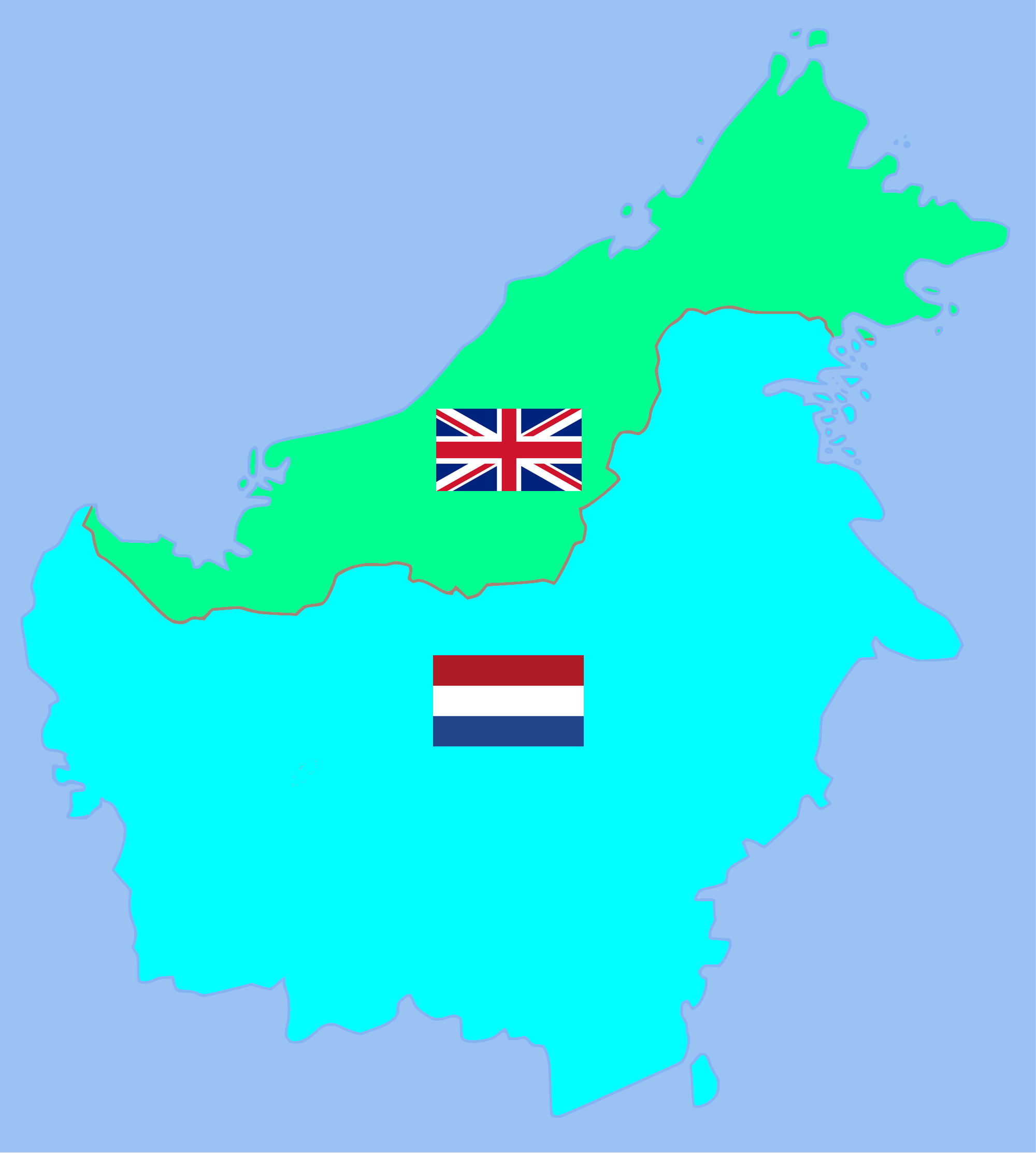
British Borneo
Dutch Borneo

Dutch East Indies Expansion, peak in 1942 at loss to Japan

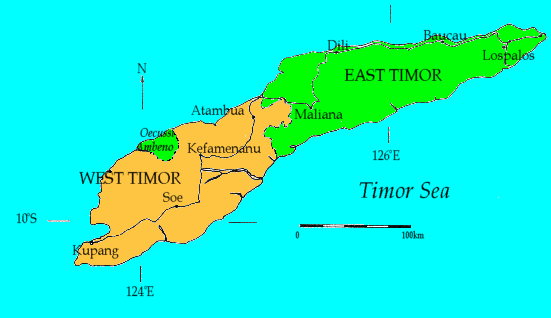
Map of Timor

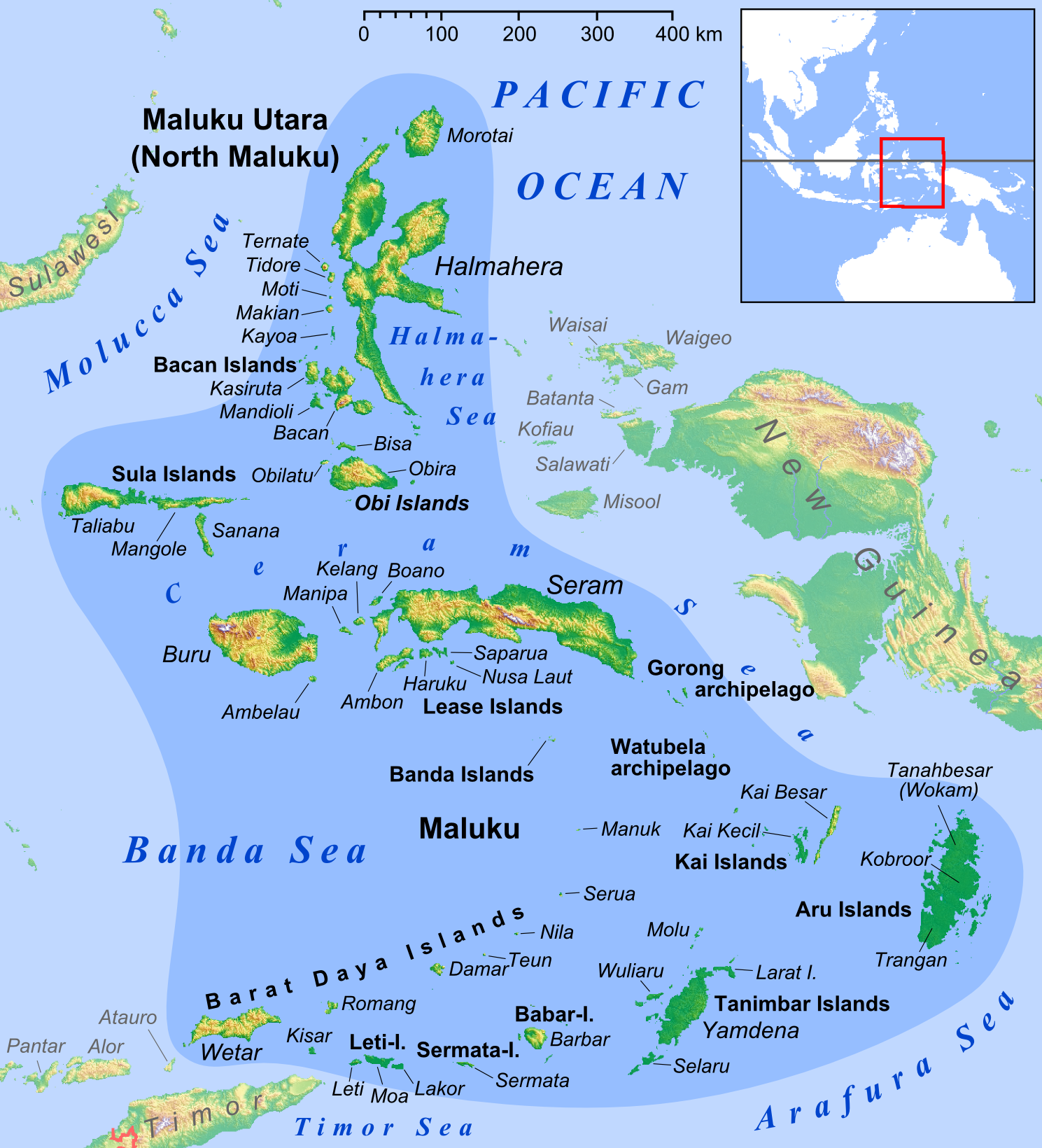
Modern map of the Maluku Islands

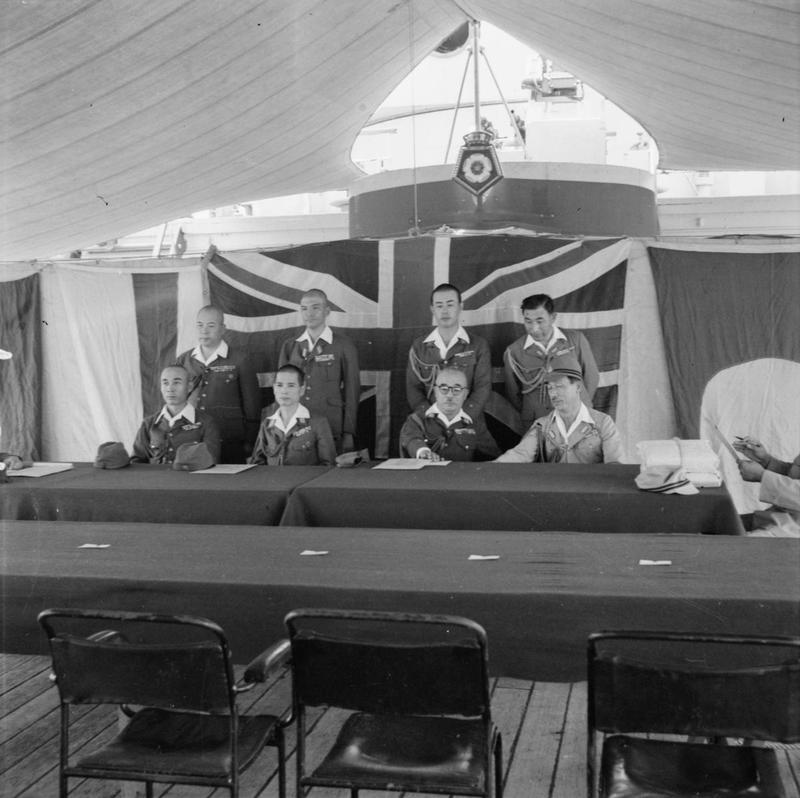
Japanese prepare to discuss surrender terms with British-allied forces in Java in 1945

Map of rejected Greater Indonesia

Current map of Indonesia

== See also ==
- Operation Semut
- Operation Agas
- Operation Adder
- Battle of Sunda Strait
- Western New Guinea campaign
- US Naval Advance Bases
- List of Royal Australian Navy bases
- Rawagede massacre - committed by the Royal Netherlands East Indies Army on 9 December 1947

== Sources ==
- Mizuma, Masanori (2013). ひと目でわかる「アジア解放」時代の日本精神 [Japanese spirit in the "Liberation of Asia" era that can be seen at a glance] (in Japanese). PHP Institute. ISBN 978-4-569-81389-9.
- Pramoedya Ananta Toer (1998). The Mute's Soliloquy. Translated by Willem Samuels. Penguin. ISBN 0-14-028904-6.
- Vickers, Adrian (2013). A History Modern of Indonesia (2nd ed.). Cambridge University Press. ISBN 978-1-107-62445-0.
