= List of ship commissionings in 1923 =

The list of ship commissionings in 1923 is a chronological list of ships commissioned in 1923. In cases where no official commissioning ceremony was held, the date of service entry may be used instead.

	Operator	Ship	Flag	Class and type	Pennant	Other notes
11 January	United States Navy	S-11		S-class submarine	SS-116	
4 April	United States Navy	S-36		S-class submarine	SS-141	
30 April	United States Navy	S-12		S-class submarine	SS-117	
11 May	United States Navy	S-38		S-class submarine	SS-143	
23 May	Royal Danish Navy	HDMS Niels Juel		Coastal defense ship		
28 May	Spanish Navy	B-4		B-class submarine	B-4	
21 June	Royal Netherlands Navy	HNLMS K IX		K VIII-class submarine	K IX	
9 July	United States Navy	S-25		S-class submarine	SS-130	
14 July	United States Navy	S-13		S-class submarine	SS-118	
16 July	United States Navy	S-37		S-class submarine	SS-142	
20 August	Royal Netherlands Navy	Pro Patria		Pro Patria-class minelayer		
24 August	United States Navy	S-24		S-class submarine	SS-129	
30 August	United States Navy	Colorado		Colorado-class battleship	BB-45	
14 September	United States Navy	S-39		S-class submarine	SS-144	
24 September	Royal Netherlands Navy	K X		K VIII-class submarine	K X	
15 October	United States Navy	S-26		S-class submarine	SS-131	
30 October	United States Navy	S-23		S-class submarine	SS-128	
20 November	United States Navy	S-40		S-class submarine	SS-145	
1 December	United States Navy	West Virginia		Colorado-class battleship	BB-48	
13 December	United States Navy	S-28		S-class submarine	SS-133	
