= USS T-3 =

Submarine of the United States

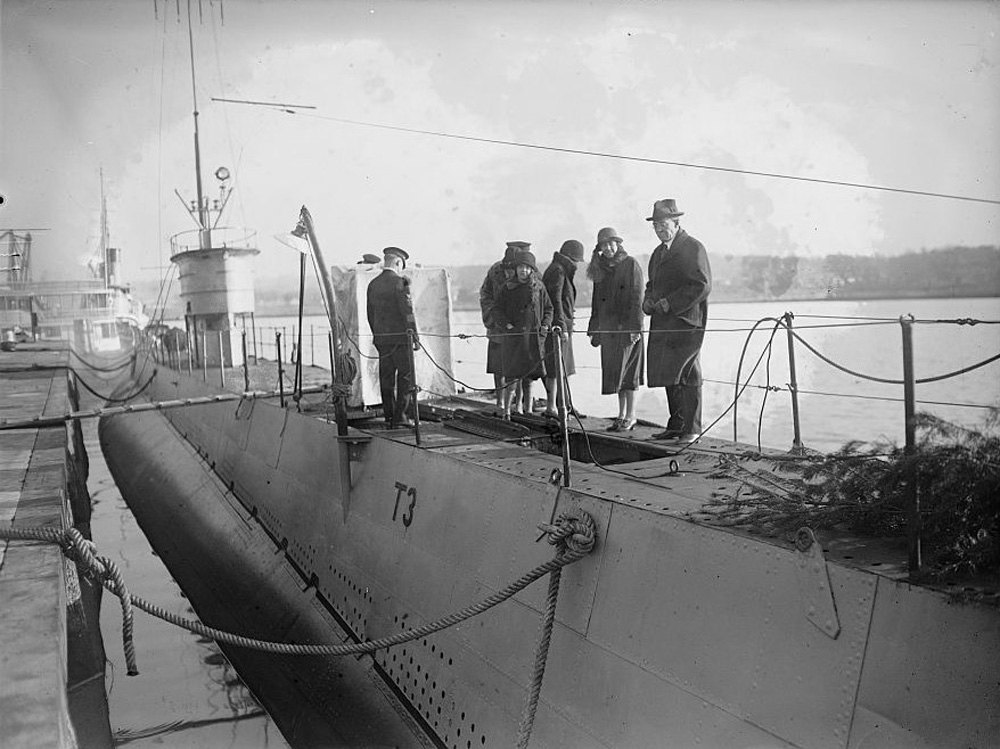
- USS T-3 being inspected by Assistant Secretary of the Navy Theodore Douglas Robinson and his family on 23 December 1925.

History

United States
- Name: USS AA-3
- Builder: Fore River Shipyard
- Laid down: 21 May 1917
- Launched: 24 May 1919
- Commissioned: 7 December 1920
- Decommissioned: 11 November 1922
- Renamed: T-3 22 September 1920
- Recommissioned: 1 October 1925
- Decommissioned: 14 July 1927
- Stricken: 19 September 1930
- Fate: Scrapped 1931

General characteristics
- Class & type: AA-1-class diesel-electric submarine
- Displacement: 1,107 tons (1,125 t) surfaced; 1,482 tons (1,506 t) submerged
- Length: 268 ft 9 in (81.92 m)
- Beam: 22 ft 10 in (6.96 m)
- Draft: 14 ft 2 in (4.32 m) mean
- Propulsion: (as built) four New London Ship & Engine (NELSECO) four cycle six-cylinder diesels, 1,000 hp (750 kW) each, and two Electro Dynamic main motors, 675 hp (503 kW) each, direct drive; one NELSECO four cycle four-cylinder auxiliary diesel; two banks of 60 Exide batteries; (re-engined) two Maschinenfabrik Augsburg Nürnberg AG (MAN) four cycle ten-cylinder diesels, 2,350 hp (1,750 kW) each
- Speed: 20 knots (37 km/h; 23 mph) surfaced; 10.5 knots (19.4 km/h; 12.1 mph) submerged
- Range: 3,000 nmi (5,600 km; 3,500 mi) at 14 kn (26 km/h; 16 mph) on 23,602–24,092 USgal (89,412–91,268 liters) oil fuel
- Test depth: 150 ft (46 m)
- Complement: 4 officers, 5 chief petty officers, 45 enlisted
- Armament: four 18-inch (450 mm) torpedo tubes (bow, 12 torpedoes), one 4in/50 caliber deck guns

USS T-3 (SS-61/SF-3) was an AA-1-class submarine in the service of the United States Navy originally named AA-3.

She was laid down as AA-3 on 21 May 1917 at the Fore River Shipbuilding Company yard in Quincy, Massachusetts, by the Electric Boat Co. of New York, launched on 24 May 1919, sponsored by Mrs. Lilian Terhune Jordan, redesignated SF-3 on 17 July 1920, renamed T-3 on 22 September 1920, and commissioned on 7 December 1920 at the Boston Navy Yard.

The second of three ships in a program to construct long-range reconnaissance submarines to operate with the surface fleet, T-3 joined T-1 in Submarine Division 15, Atlantic Fleet, soon after commissioning. She operated with that division – later to include T-2 – conducting maneuvers with the Atlantic Fleet until the fall of 1922. By that time, flaws in the design and construction of the T-boats – particularly in their propulsion plants – caused them to perform poorly. The decision was made to retire all three to the reserve fleet, and T-3 was the first to go. On 11 November 1922, she was decommissioned at Hampton Roads, Virginia, and berthed at the submarine base there. Later, she was moved to Philadelphia.

However, T-3's active service did not end there. At the time of the T-boats' decommissioning, the idea of testing German-produced diesel engines in one of them had been bantered about in Navy circles. T-1 had originally been designated for this purpose, but funds were not then available. In 1925, when money was forthcoming, it was T-3 that came out of mothballs for the tests. On 1 October 1925, T-3 was recommissioned at Philadelphia. For the following 21 months, she tested her newly installed 3,000 horsepower (2,200 kW) M.A.N. diesel engines for the Bureau of Engineering. Early in the summer of 1927, she completed the tests and, on 14 July 1927, was placed out of commission at Philadelphia. After a little over three years of inactivity, her name was stricken from the Navy List on 19 September 1930. Her hulk was broken up, and the materials were sold for scrap on 20 November 1930.

== See also ==
- List of United States Navy submarines
