= HNLMS Van Meerlant =

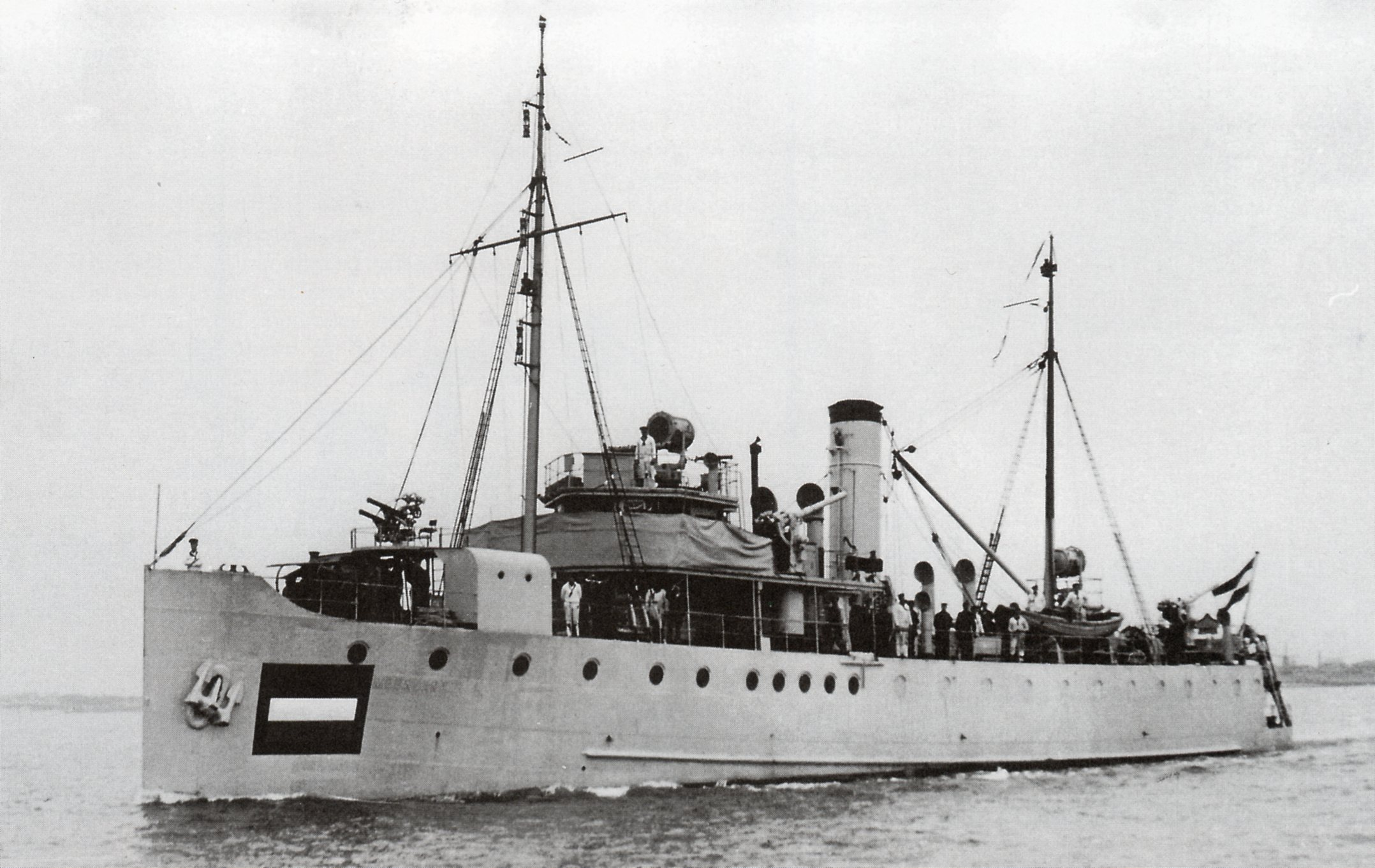
- Van Meerlant

History

Netherlands
- Name: Van Meerlant
- Builder: Gusto shipyard, Schiedam
- Laid down: 14 October 1919
- Launched: 23 November 1920
- Commissioned: 25 July 1922
- Fate: Sunk by mine, 4 June 1941

General characteristics (as built)
- Class & type: Douwe Aukes-class minelayer
- Displacement: 687 long tons (698 t) (standard)
- Length: 54.8 m (179 ft 9 in) (pp)
- Beam: 8.7 m (28 ft 7 in)
- Draught: 3.2 m (10 ft 6 in)
- Installed power: 2 Yarrow boilers; 746 kW (1,000 ihp)
- Propulsion: 2 shafts; 2 vertical triple expansion engines
- Speed: 13 knots (24 km/h; 15 mph)
- Endurance: 115 t (113 long tons) coal
- Complement: 60
- Armament: 3 × 75 mm (3 in) guns; 2 × 12.7 mm (0.50 in) machine guns; 60 naval mines

HNLMS Van Meerlant (ML 36) was a Douwe Aukes-class minelayer built for the Royal Netherlands Navy during the 1920s. Completed in 1922, she played a minor role during the Second World War. After Germany invaded the Netherlands in May 1940 the ship fled to the United Kingdom. Van Meerlant was transferred to the Royal Navy in 1941 and was sunk by a mine later that year with the loss of 41 crewmen.

== Description ==
The Douwe Aukes class was an improved version of the preceding Hydra-class minelayers. The ships had a standard displacement of 687 long tons (698 t) and 748 t (736 long tons) at normal loads. They measured 54.8 metres (179 ft 9 in) long between perpendiculars with a beam of 8.7 m (28 ft 7 in) and a draught of 3.2 m (10 ft 6 in). The minelayers were powered by steam from two Yarrow boilers to two vertical triple expansion engines each turning a shaft. The system was rated at 746 kilowatts (1,000 ihp). (Note: van Willigenberg has the vessel's propulsion system at 870 kilowatts (1,170 shp).) The vessels carried 115 t (113 long tons) of coal as fuel and had a maximum speed of 13 knots (24 km/h; 15 mph). The Douwe Aukes class had a complement of 60 officers and ratings.

Both vessels were initially armed with three single-mounted 40-calibre 75 mm (3 in) semi-automatic guns and two single-mounted 12.7 mm (0.50 in) anti-aircraft (AA) machine guns. They carried 60 naval mines. Though they were larger than the Hydra class, they carried ten less mines.

== Construction and career ==
Van Meerlant was laid down on 14 October 1919 at the Gusto shipyard in Schiedam, launched on 23 November 1920, and commissioned on 25 July 1922.

On the general mobilisation of the Dutch military on 28 August 1939, Van Meerlant was deployed to lay minefields, including ones at IJmuiden and the Hook of Holland. She sailed for the United Kingdom from Vlissingen alongside the gunboat Flores, arriving on 18 May. She was first stationed at Falmouth, alongside her sister ship Douwe Aukes and the Dutch minelayer Medusa. Later that year Van Meerlant was posted to Chatham and assigned to the Thames Local Defence Flotilla, responsible for maintaining the boom defences in the Thames Estuary. On 14 March she was transferred to the Royal Navy, retaining her name as HMS Van Meerlant. She was sunk on 4 June 1941 by a mine, with 42 crewmen killed.

== Bibliography ==
- Mark, Chris (1997). Schepen van de Koninklijke Marine in W.O. II (in Dutch). De Alk. ISBN 90-6013-522-9.
- Roberts, John (1980). "The Netherlands". In Chesneau, Roger (ed.). Conway's All the World's Fighting Ships 1922–1946. Conway Maritime Press. pp. 385–396. ISBN 0-85177-146-7.
- Sturton, Ian (1985). "Netherlands". In Gray, Randal (ed.). Conway's All the World's Fighting Ships 1906–1921. Naval Institute Press. pp. 363–371. ISBN 0-87021-907-3.
- van Willigenburg, Henk (2010). Dutch Warships of World War II. Lanasta. ISBN 978-90-8616-318-2.
