= N39 =

N39 may refer to:

- HNLMS K IX (N39), a submarine of the Royal Netherlands Navy
- Iwaidja language
- Nebraska Highway 39, in the United States
- Northrop N-39, an American prototype aircraft
- N39 road (Belgium)
