= HNLMS Douwe Aukes =

Dutch navy minelayer

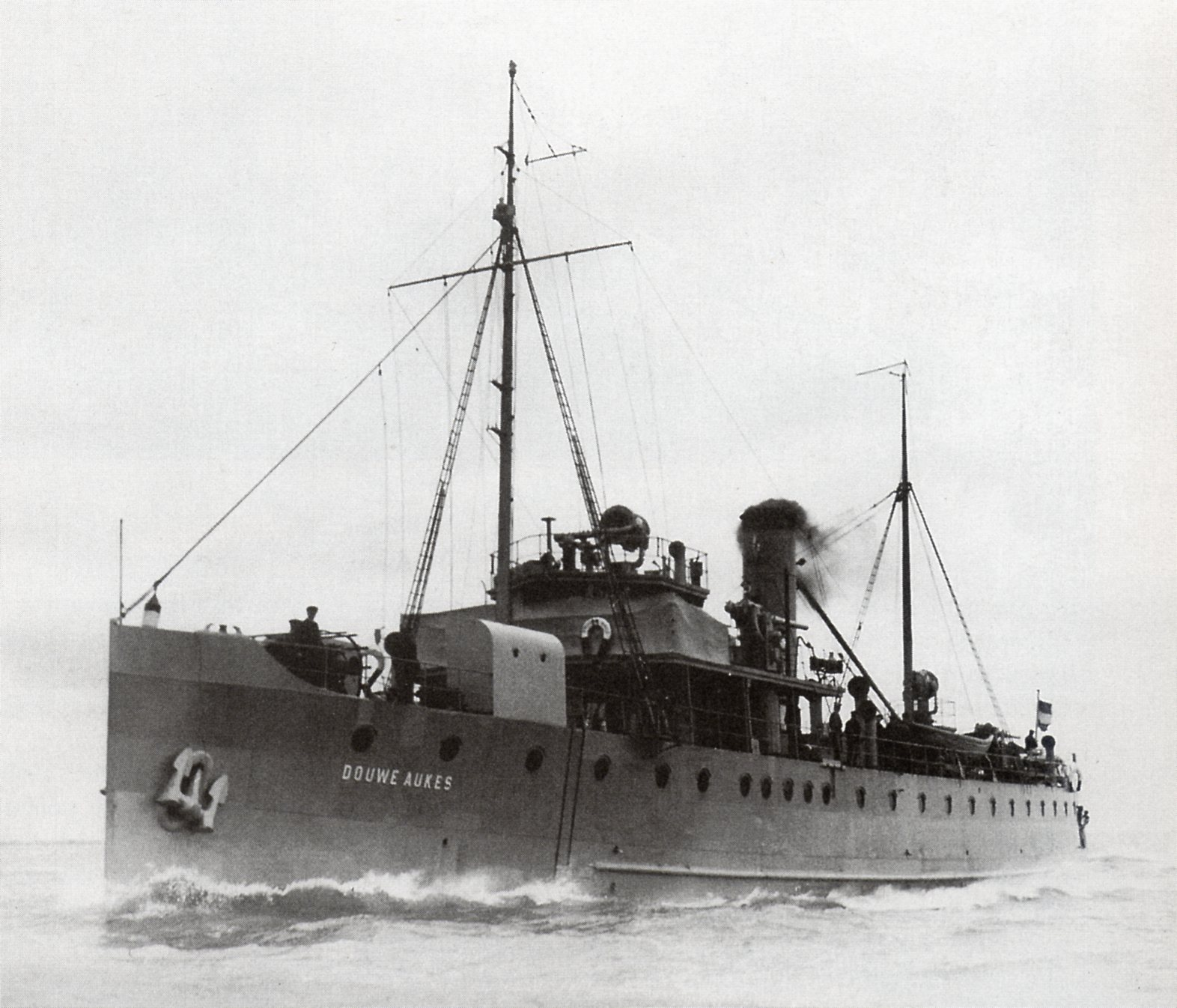

History

Netherlands
- Name: Douwe Aukes
- Namesake: Douwe Aukes
- Builder: Gusto shipyard, Schiedam
- Laid down: 28 October 1919
- Launched: 23 January 1922
- In service: 2 November 1922
- Out of service: 1 February 1960

General characteristics (as built)
- Type: Minelayer
- Displacement: 687 long tons (698 t) (standard)
- Length: 54.8 m (179 ft 9 in) (pp)
- Beam: 8.7 m (28 ft 7 in)
- Draught: 3.2 m (10 ft 6 in)
- Installed power: 2 Yarrow boilers; 746 kW (1,000 ihp)
- Propulsion: 2 shafts; 2 vertical triple expansion engines
- Speed: 13 knots (24 km/h; 15 mph)
- Endurance: 115 t (113 long tons) coal
- Complement: 60
- Armament: 3 × 75 mm (3 in) guns; 2 × 12.7 mm (0.50 in) machine guns; 60 naval mines

HNLMS Douwe Aukes (ML 1, N 81) was the lead ship of her class of minelayers built for the Royal Netherlands Navy during the 1920s. Completed in 1922, she played a minor role during the Second World War. After Germany invaded the Netherlands in May 1940 the ship fled to the United Kingdom. Douwe Aukes was transferred to the Royal Navy in 1941 and was returned to the Royal Netherlands Navy in 1945 where she served as a depot ship. She was sold for scrap in 1962

== Description ==
The Douwe Aukes class was an improved version of the preceding Hydra-class minelayers. The ships had a standard displacement of 687 long tons (698 t) and 748 t (736 long tons) at normal loads. They measured 54.8 metres (179 ft 9 in) long between perpendiculars with a beam of 8.7 m (28 ft 7 in) and a draught of 3.2 m (10 ft 6 in). The minelayers were powered by steam from two Yarrow boilers to two vertical triple expansion engines each turning a shaft. The system was rated at 746 kilowatts (1,000 ihp). (Note: van Willigenberg has the vessel's propulsion system at 870 kilowatts (1,170 shp).) The vessels carried 115 t (113 long tons) of coal as fuel and had a maximum speed of 13 knots (24 km/h; 15 mph). The Douwe Aukes class had a complement of 60 officers and ratings.

Both vessels were initially armed with three single-mounted 75 millimetres (3 in) semi-automatic guns and two single-mounted 12.7 mm (0.50 in) anti-aircraft (AA) machine guns. They carried 60 naval mines. Though they were larger than the Hydra class, they carried ten less mines. In British service, Douwe Aukes was converted to a convoy escort and re-armed with one 75 mm gun AA gun, two single-mounted 2-pounder (40 mm (1.6 in)) AA guns and two 20 millimetres (0.8 in) AA guns.

== Construction and career ==
Douwe Aukes was laid down on 28 October 1919 at the Gusto shipyard in Schiedam, launched on 23 January 1922, and commissioned on 2 November 1922.

On 14 May 1940 Douwe Aukes fled to the United Kingdom. She was first stationed at Falmouth alongside her sister ship Van Meerlant and the minelayer HNLMS Medusa, and then at Sheerness. From 29 April 1941 she was lent to the Royal Navy for anti-aircraft duties on the eastern English coast. She was also active in the D-Day landings as an anti-aircraft gunboat. She was returned to the Dutch Navy in 1945.

After the war, Douwe Aukes acted as a depot ship for the Mine Service. She was decommissioned on 1 February 1962 and sold for scrap on 6 July.

== Bibliography ==
- Mark, Chris (1997). Schepen van de Koninklijke Marine in W.O. II (in Dutch). De Alk. ISBN 90-6013-522-9.
- Roberts, John (1980). "The Netherlands". In Chesneau, Roger (ed.). Conway's All the World's Fighting Ships 1922–1946. Conway Maritime Press. pp. 385–396. ISBN 0-85177-146-7.
- Sturton, Ian (1985). "Netherlands". In Gray, Randal (ed.). Conway's All the World's Fighting Ships 1906–1921. Naval Institute Press. pp. 363–371. ISBN 0-87021-907-3.
- van Willigenburg, Henk (2010). Dutch Warships of World War II. Lanasta. ISBN 978-90-8616-318-2.
