= Operation Adder =

Australian military operation in Timor during World War II

- Part of South West Pacific theatre of World War II
Date	August 1944
Location	Timor
Result	Japanese victory

Belligerents
Australia	Empire of Japan

Commanders and leaders
Captain John Grimson ‡‡	Unknown

Strength
5	Unknown

Casualties and losses
5	Unknown

Operation Adder was a military operation conducted by Australia's Services Reconnaissance Department in Timor during World War II in August 1944. A party consisting of two Australian soldiers, Captain John Grimson and signaller Ernest Gregg, and three Portuguese Timorese, was dropped on Timor.

Japanese intelligence knew of the operation and ambushed the team on the morning of 24 August at Cape lie Hoi, during which Gregg and one of the Timorese was killed. There was another skirmish later that day after which Captain Grimson was found dead through self-inflicted wounds. The two surviving Timorese were later killed.

== See also ==
- Operation Semut
- Operation Agas
- Naval Base Borneo
