= HNLMS K II =

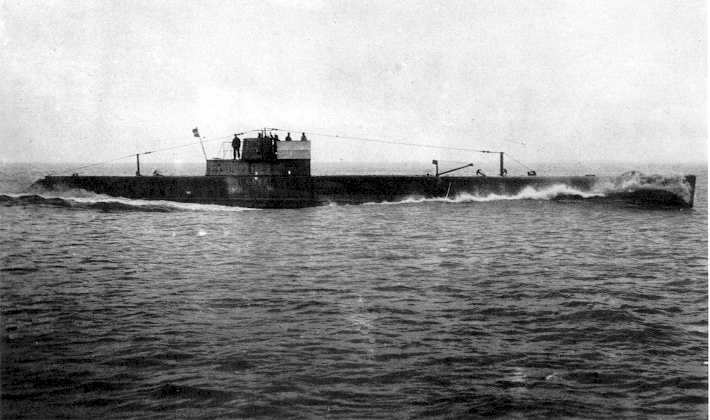
- K II

History

Netherlands
- Name: K II
- Builder: Fijenoord, Rotterdam
- Laid down: 20 November 1915
- Launched: 27 February 1919
- Commissioned: 28 March 1922
- Decommissioned: August 1937
- Fate: Decommissioned 1937

General characteristics
- Class & type: none
- Type: Unique submarine
- Displacement: 569 tons surfaced; 649 tons submerged
- Length: 57.31 m (188 ft 0 in)
- Beam: 5.29 m (17 ft 4 in)
- Draught: 3.82 m (12 ft 6 in)
- Propulsion: 2 × 900 bhp (671 kW) diesel engines; 2 × 250 bhp (186 kW) electric motors
- Speed: 15.5 kn (28.7 km/h; 17.8 mph) surfaced; 8.5 kn (15.7 km/h; 9.8 mph) submerged
- Range: 3,500 nmi (6,500 km; 4,000 mi) at 11 kn (20 km/h; 13 mph) on the surface; 25 nmi (46 km; 29 mi) at 8.5 kn (15.7 km/h; 9.8 mph) submerged
- Complement: 29
- Armament: 2 × 18 inch bow torpedo tubes; 2 × 18 inch stern torpedo tubes; 1 x 75 mm gun; 1 x 12.7 mm machine gun

K II was a unique patrol submarine of the Royal Netherlands Navy. The ship was built by Fijenoord shipyard in Rotterdam. The boat had a diving dept of 40 metres (130 ft).

== Design ==
K II was known under personnel of the Royal Netherlands Navy Submarine Service (OZD) as being part of the coffin series submarines. These were submarines of the OZD that looked like a coffin because of their square upper structure, instead of the more rounded upper structure most other submarines of the OZD had.

== Service history ==
The submarine was laid down in Rotterdam at the shipyard of Fijenoord on November 20, 1915. The launch took place on February 27, 1919. On March 28, 1922 K II was commissioned in the Dutch navy.

On September 18, 1923 K II together with K VII, K VIII and the submarine tender Pelikaan began their journey to the Dutch East Indies, the ships' theater of operations. On board K II was professor F.A. Vening Meinesz who conducted gravity measurements. He left the ship in Colombo. The ships where delayed when Pelikaan ran aground at Tunis.

On December 11, 1923 the ships arrived at Sabang where they stayed until December 7. On December 7, they set sail for Tanjung Priok where they arrived at December 24, 1923.

The boat was decommissioned in August 1937.
