= HNLMS K X =

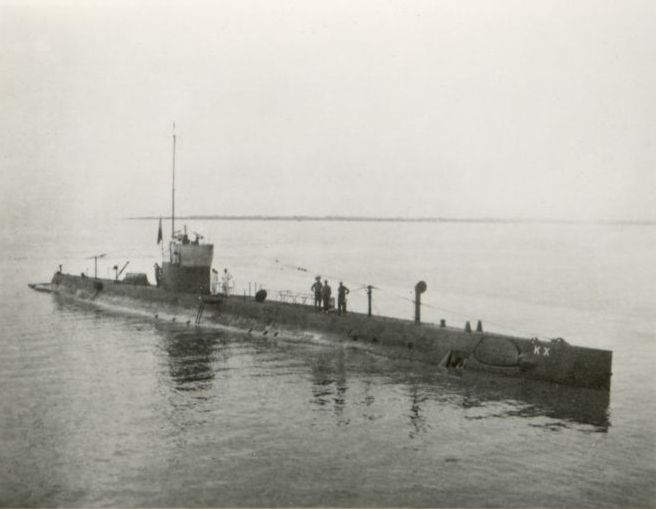
- Dutch Submarine K X in Surabaya, Dutch East Indies

History
- Name: HNLMS K X
- Ordered: 27 June 1917
- Builder: Koninklijke Maatschappij de Schelde, Vlissingen
- Yard number: 169
- Laid down: 1 November 1919
- Launched: 2 May 1923
- Commissioned: 24 September 1923
- Decommissioned: 2 March 1942
- Fate: Scuttled, 2 March 1942; Scrapped, 1946

General characteristics
- Class & type: K VIII-class submarine
- Displacement: Surfaced: 520 long tons (528 t) standard; 583 long tons (592 t) full load; Submerged: 715 long tons (726 t) standard; 810 long tons (823 t) full load
- Length: 64.41 m (211 ft 4 in)
- Beam: 5.6 m (18 ft 4 in)
- Draught: 3.55 m (11 ft 8 in)
- Propulsion: 2 × 775 hp (578 kW) 6-cylinder Sulzer 2-stroke diesel engines; 2 × 200 hp (149 kW) electric motors; 2 shafts
- Speed: Surfaced: 15 knots (28 km/h; 17 mph); Submerged: 8 kn (15 km/h; 9.2 mph)
- Range: Surfaced: 3,500 nmi (6,500 km; 4,000 mi) at 11 kn (20 km/h; 13 mph); Submerged: 25 nmi (46 km; 29 mi) at 8 kn (15 km/h; 9.2 mph)
- Test depth: 50 m (160 ft)
- Complement: 31
- Armament: 4 × 450 mm (17.7 in) torpedo tubes (2 bow, 2 stern); 10 × Type III 45cm torpedoes; 1 × 88 mm (3.5 in) deck gun; 1 × 12.7 mm machine gun

HNLMS K X was one of the three K VIII-class submarines of the Royal Netherlands Navy, built to serve as a patrol vessel in the Dutch colonies.

== Ship history ==
The submarine was ordered from the Koninklijke Maatschappij de Schelde shipyard at Vlissingen on 27 June 1917, but not laid down until 1 November 1919, and finally launched on 2 May 1923. Commissioned on 24 September 1923, she sailed alone to the Dutch East Indies in late 1924.

=== World War II ===
In February and March 1941 K X, K VIII and K XIX patrolled the Sunda Strait while based at Tanjung Priok, while the Admiral Scheer was sinking Allied merchant shipping in the Indian Ocean.

After repairs at Surabaya K X returned to service on 8 December 1941 for local defense duties following the start of the war with Japan. On 25 December 1941 K X sailed to the Celebes Sea following the Japanese invasion of the Philippines.

On 8 January 1942 K X arrived at Tarakan in Borneo for repairs, just days before the Japanese invasion. K X slipped out of port on 10 January and after dark observed a large fleet of Japanese ships at anchor off the coast. While attempting to position herself for a torpedo attack the submarine was spotted by an enemy destroyer and was forced to submerge. Short on battery power and with faulty steering gear and only one diesel engine operating the submarine returned to Surabaya for repairs.

K X returned to duty on 24 February to patrol off Surabaya. During the Japanese invasion of Java she was damaged by depth charges and forced to return to port. On 2 March 1942 K X was scuttled at Surabaya to avoid being captured by the Japanese. K X was raised by the Japanese during the war and used as a floating oil hulk. Recovered by the Dutch after the war, she was scrapped at Surabaya in 1946.

Crewmen from K X, K IX and K XII were sent back to England to crew the submarine Haai, then under construction as HMS Varne (P66), but their unescorted passenger ship MV Abosso was sunk by the German U-boat U-575 north of the Azores on 29 October 1942, and only four of the 34 Dutch Navy men aboard survived.
