= HNLMS K VI =

History

Netherlands
- Name: K VI
- Builder: Fijenoord, Rotterdam
- Laid down: 4 April 1916
- Launched: 23 December 1920
- Commissioned: 11 October 1921
- Decommissioned: August 1937

General characteristics
- Type: K V-class submarine
- Displacement: 569 tons surfaced; 649 tons submerged
- Length: 57.31 m (188 ft 0 in)
- Beam: 5.6 m (18 ft 4 in)
- Draught: 3.82 m (12 ft 6 in)
- Propulsion: 2 × 600 bhp (447 kW) diesel engines; 2 × 200 bhp (149 kW) electric motors
- Speed: 13.5 kn (25.0 km/h; 15.5 mph) surfaced; 8 kn (15 km/h; 9.2 mph) submerged
- Range: 3,500 nmi (6,500 km; 4,000 mi) at 11 kn (20 km/h; 13 mph) on the surface; 25 nmi (46 km; 29 mi) at 8 kn (15 km/h; 9.2 mph) submerged
- Complement: 31
- Armament: 2 × 17.7 inch bow torpedo tubes; 2 × 17.7 inch stern torpedo tubes; 2 × 17.7 inch external-traversing torpedo tubes forward of the conning tower; 1 x 75 mm gun; 1 x 12.7 mm machine gun

K VI was a K V-class patrol submarine of the Royal Netherlands Navy. The ship was built by Fijenoord shipyard in Rotterdam.

== Service history ==
The submarine was laid down in Rotterdam at the shipyard of Fijenoord on 4 April 1916. The launch took place on 23 December 1920. On 11 October 1921 the ship was commissioned in the Dutch navy.

27 October 1921 K VI left the port of Den Helder for the Dutch East Indies her theater of operations. She made the journey without an escort. The route she took made stops at Port Said, the Suez Canal, Sabang to Surabaya, where she arrived on 31 January 1922.

In 1935 K VI was removed from active service and in August 1937 decommissioned.
