= K VIII-class submarine =

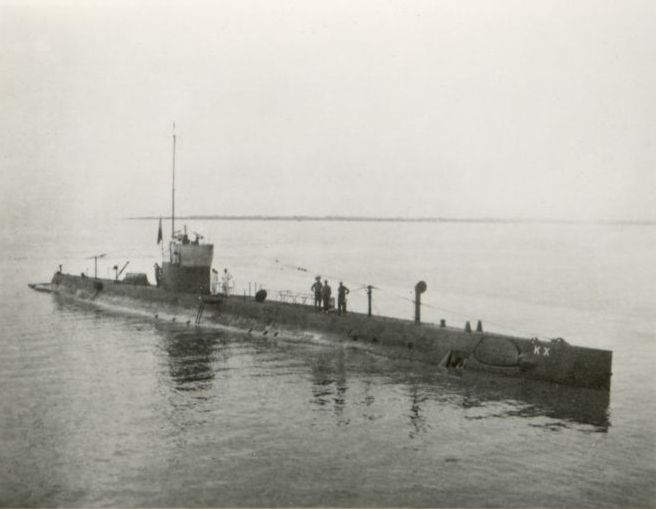
- Dutch submarine K X, in Surabaya, Dutch East Indies

Class overview
- Name: K VIII class
- Builders: Koninklijke Maatschappij De Schelde, Vlissingen, Netherlands
- Operators: Royal Netherlands Navy; Royal Australian Navy
- Preceded by: K V class
- Succeeded by: K XI class
- Built: 1917–1923
- In commission: 1922–1944
- Completed: 3
- Retired: 3

General characteristics
- Type: Patrol submarine
- Displacement: Surfaced: 520 long tons (528 t) standard; 583 long tons (592 t) full load; Submerged: 715 long tons (726 t) standard; 810 long tons (823 t) full load
- Length: 64.41 m (211 ft 4 in)
- Beam: 5.6 m (18 ft 4 in)
- Draught: 3.55 m (11 ft 8 in)
- Propulsion: K VIII; 2 × 900 hp (671 kW) 8-cylinder MAN 2-stroke diesel engines; K IX & K X; 2 × 775 hp (578 kW) 6-cylinder Sulzer 2-stroke diesel engines; All; 2 × 200 hp (149 kW) electric motors; 2 shafts
- Speed: K VIII; 16 kn (30 km/h) surfaced; 8 kn (15 km/h) submerged; K IX & K X; 15 kn (28 km/h) surfaced; 8 kn (15 km/h) submerged
- Range: 3,500 nmi (6,500 km) at 11 kn (20 km/h) surfaced; 25 nmi (46 km) at 8 kn (15 km/h) submerged
- Test depth: 50 m (160 ft)
- Complement: 31
- Armament: 4 × 450 mm (17.7 in) torpedo tubes (2 bow, 2 stern); 10 × Type III 45cm torpedoes; 1 × 88 mm (3.5 in) deck gun; 1 × 12.7 mm machine gun

The K VIII-class submarine was a three boat class of submarines of the Koninklijke Marine (Royal Netherlands Navy). The class varied from K V-class submarine due to the removal of two external torpedo tubes, which were removed to reduce the boats' vulnerability to depth charging. The boat had a diving depth of 50 metres (160 ft). K VIII-class submarine was built after the John Philip Holland design.

All ships were still in service at the start of World War II. During the war K IX was transferred to the Royal Australian Navy and renamed K9.

== Boats ==
Name	Laid down	Launched	Commissioned	Decommissioned
K VIII	31 October 1917	28 March 1922	15 September 1922	15 July 1942
K IX; Renamed: HMAS K9	1 March 1919	23 December 1922	21 June 1923 (Dutch navy); 22 June 1943 (Australian navy)	15 July 1942 (Dutch navy); 31 March 1944 (Australian navy)
K X	1 November 1919	2 May 1923	24 September 1923	2 March 1942
