= AA-1-class submarine =

Class of three experimental submarines of the United States Navy,

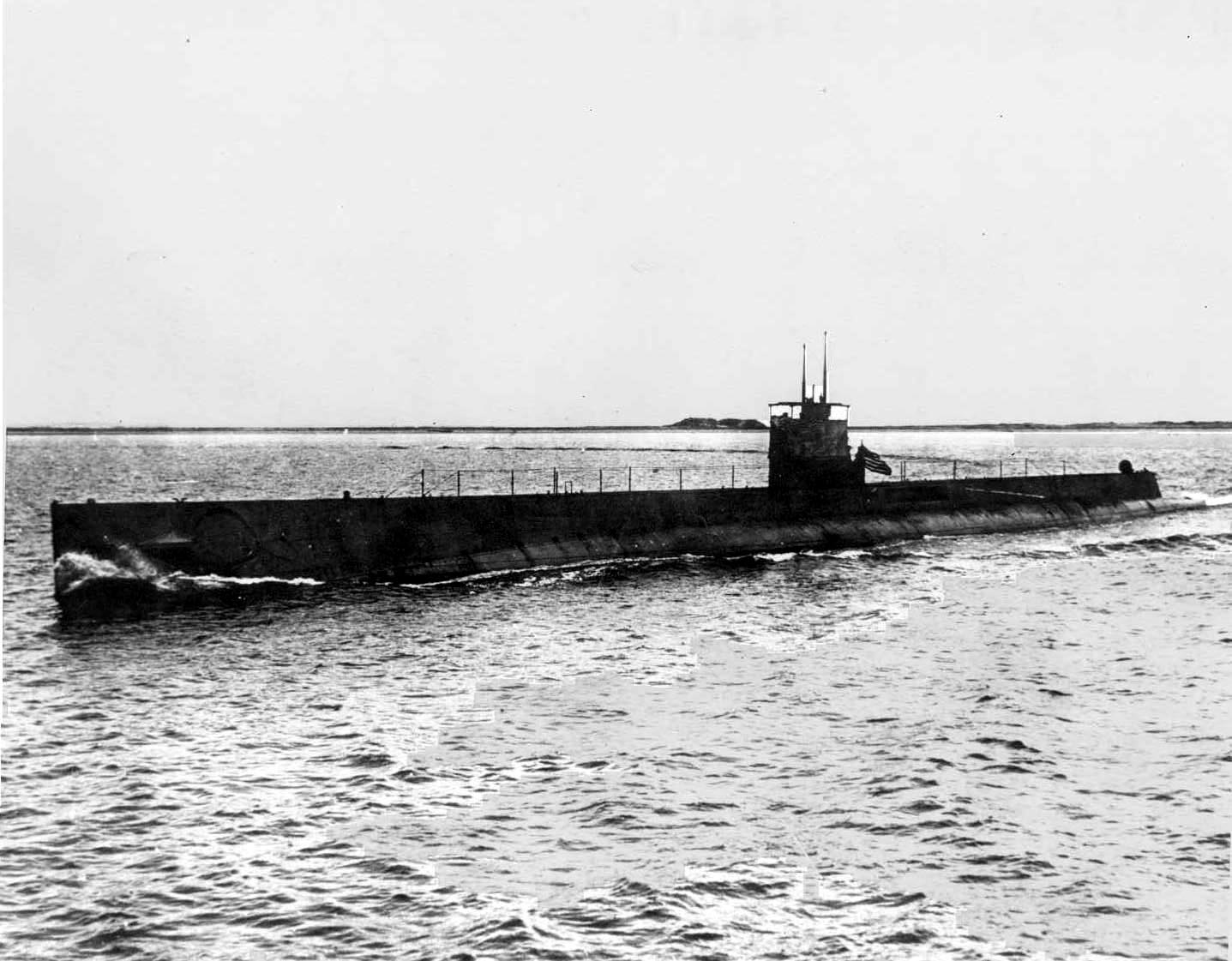
- USS AA-1 (SS-52)

Class overview
- Name: AA-1 class
- Builders: Electric Boat Company (design); Fore River Shipbuilding
- Operators: United States Navy
- Preceded by: USS M-1
- Succeeded by: N class
- Built: 1916–1922
- In service: 1920–1927
- Completed: 3
- Retired: 3

General characteristics
- Type: Submarine
- Displacement: 1,106 long tons (1,124 t) (surfaced); 1,486 long tons (1,510 t) (submerged)
- Length: 268 ft 9 in (81.92 m) overall
- Beam: 22 ft 4 in (6.81 m)
- Draft: 14 ft 2 in (4.32 m)
- Propulsion: (as built) 4 × NELSECO diesel engines, 1000 hp (746 kW) each; 2 × Electro Dynamic electric motors, 675 hp (503 kW) each; 1 × NELSECO auxiliary diesel generator; 2 × 60-cell Exide batteries; 2 × shafts
- Speed: 20 kn (23 mph; 37 km/h) surfaced; 10.5 knots (19.4 km/h; 12.1 mph) submerged
- Range: 3,000 nmi (5,600 km) at 14 kn (26 km/h; 16 mph) (surfaced); 100 nmi (190 km) at 5 kn (9.3 km/h; 5.8 mph) (submerged)
- Test depth: 150 ft (46 m)
- Complement: 54
- Armament: AA-1 (as built) eight 18 inch (450 mm) torpedo tubes (four bow internal, four mounted under the deck in trainable pairs fore and aft of the conning tower) 16 torpedoes total; AA-1 (early modification) six 18 inch (450 mm) torpedo tubes (four bow internal, two mounted under the deck in trainable pair aft of the conning tower) 14 torpedoes total, one 4-inch (102 mm)/50 caliber fixed deck gun forward; AA-1 (later modification), four 18 inch (450 mm) torpedo tubes (four bow internal) 12 torpedoes total, one 4-inch (102 mm)/50 caliber fixed deck gun forward; AA-2 and AA3 (as built) four 18 inch (450 mm) torpedo tubes (four bow internal) 12 torpedoes total

The AA-1 class was a class of three experimental submarines of the United States Navy, built toward the end of World War I, between 1916 and 1920, intended to produce a high-speed fleet submarine. The design was not a success and the submarines saw only limited active service. However, the lessons learned were applied to the design of the later V-boats. The class was later renamed as the T-class.

== Design ==
In the early 1910s, only a dozen years after Holland inaugurated the Navy's undersea force, naval strategists had already begun to wish for submarines that could operate as long range reconnaissance vessels, in closer collaboration with the surface fleet than the Navy's existing classes, which had been designed primarily for coastal defense. These notional "fleet" submarines would necessarily be larger and better armed, but primarily, they would need a surface speed of some 21 knots (39 km/h; 24 mph) to be able to maneuver with the 21-knot battleships the battle fleet was built around. This was the designed speed of the Delaware class and later battleships, including the Standard-type battleships that were under construction and proposed in 1913.

In the summer of 1913, Electric Boat's chief naval architect, former naval constructor Lawrence Y. Spear, proposed two preliminary fleet-boat designs for consideration in the Navy's 1914 program. In the ensuing authorization of eight submarines, Congress specified that one should "be of a seagoing type to have a surface speed of not less than twenty knots." This first fleet boat, laid down in June 1916, was named Schley after Spanish–American War hero Winfield Scott Schley. With a displacement of 1,106 tons surfaced, 1,486 tons submerged, on a length of 270 feet (82 m), Schley (later AA-1, and finally T-1) was twice as large as any previous U.S. submarine. To expedite production Spear simply expanded an existing partial double hull design for a foreign customer without thickening the hull plating or strengthening the framework. This resulted in a complicated tank arrangement and a diving depth that was limited to 150 ft (46 m). To achieve the required surface speed, two 1,000 horsepower (750 kW) diesel engines arranged in tandem on each shaft drove twin screws, and a separate diesel generator was provided for charging batteries. Although Schley and two sister boats authorized in 1915 - AA-2 (later T-2), and AA-3 (later T-3) - initially all made their design speed of 20 knots (37 km/h; 23 mph), they could only maintain that speed for short periods of time before extreme torsional vibration problems with their tandem engines forced them to slow. As the engines were clutched together, it was impossible to perfectly synchronize their operation and that resulted in an unbalanced situation. That and other circumstances resulted in poor engine reliability.

The engineering plant included four New London Ship and Engine Company (NELSECO) 6-EB-19 four-cycle six-cylinder diesels, 1,000 hp (750 kW) each in two tandem pairs, and two Electro Dynamic main electric motors, 675 hp (503 kW) each, directly driven by the engines. Two 60-cell Exide batteries provided submerged power. One NELSECO four-cycle four-cylinder auxiliary diesel generator was included to charge batteries while the main engines were operating at high speed. From 1923 to 1927, T-3 was re-engined with two German-built Maschinenfabrik Augsburg Nürnberg AG (MAN) four-cycle ten-cylinder diesels, 2,350 hp (1,750 kW) each.

In addition to the usual four bow 18 inch (450 mm) torpedo tubes, the design incorporated two twin trainable external torpedo tubes in the deck superstructure, immediately forward and aft of the sail. These could fire on either broadside, but not dead ahead or dead astern. Two 3-inch (76 mm)/23 caliber retractable deck guns were in the original design for the submarines, but they were never installed. As with other contemporary U.S. submarine designs, the AA-1 class was optimized for a high submerged speed, with a small conning tower fairwater and no bridge structure, although "chariot" style bridge structures were later added to all three boats. In August 1918 T-1 was experimentally rearmed with a single 4-inch (102 mm)/50 caliber non-retractable gun at the expense of the forward trainable torpedo tubes, probably to test the effect of a bigger gun on submerged speed as well as provide more anti-ship firepower. Larger submarine deck guns were considered because many German U-boats were equipped with guns of up to 105 mm (4.1 in) and some were equipped with 150 mm (5.9 inch) guns. The 4 inch gun would later become standard on the S-class submarines. The trainable tubes were eliminated from the design by the time AA-2 and AA-3 were commissioned, and only AA-1 was so equipped.

== Service ==
They were based out of Hampton Roads, Virginia as part of Submarine Division 15 in the Atlantic Fleet and were used for training and maneuvers. On August 23, 1917, Schley was renamed AA-1 prior to launching, to free the name for the destroyer Schley. On July 17, 1920, the three boats were reclassified as Fleet Submarines and given the hull numbers SF-1, SF-2, and SF-3. Their names were changed from the AA-series to T-1, T-2, and T-3 on September 22, 1920. AA-2 and AA-3 never carried those names during their commissioned service, having been renamed into the T-series after launching but before being accepted by the Navy.

All three boats had been decommissioned by 1923 and placed into storage at Philadelphia, Pennsylvania. Between 1925 and 1927, T-3 was restored to service in order to test German-built diesels (2,350 hp (1,750 kW) MAN engines), then returned to Philadelphia. All three were struck from the Naval Vessel Register on 19 September 1930 and sold for scrap on 20 November 1930.

== Boats in class ==
USS Schley, AA-1, T-1

- Designation: Submarine No. 52, SS-52, SF-1
- Builders: United States (Fore River Shipbuilding in Quincy, Massachusetts)
- Laid down: 21 June 1916
- Launched: 25 July 1918
- Operator: United States Navy
- Commissioned: 30 January 1920
- Decommissioned: 5 December 1922
- Fate: Sold for scrap 20 November 1930
- Operations: Trials and training

USS AA-2, T-2

- Designation: Submarine No. 60, SS-60, SF-2
- Builders: United States (Fore River Shipbuilding in Quincy, Massachusetts)
- Laid down: 31 May 1917
- Launched: 6 September 1919
- Operator: United States Navy
- Commissioned: 7 January 1922
- Decommissioned: 16 July 1923
- Fate: Sold for scrap 20 November 1930
- Operations: Training

USS AA-3, T-3

- Designations: Submarine No. 61, SS-61, SF-3
- Builders: United States (Fore River Shipbuilding in Quincy, Massachusetts)
- Laid down: 21 May 1917
- Launched: 24 May 1919
- Operator: United States Navy
- Commissioned: 7 December 1920
- Decommissioned: 14 July 1927
- Fate: Sold for scrap 20 November 1930
- Operations: Training, engine trials

== See also ==
- List of United States submarine classes
