= USS T-1 (SS-52) =

Submarine of the United States

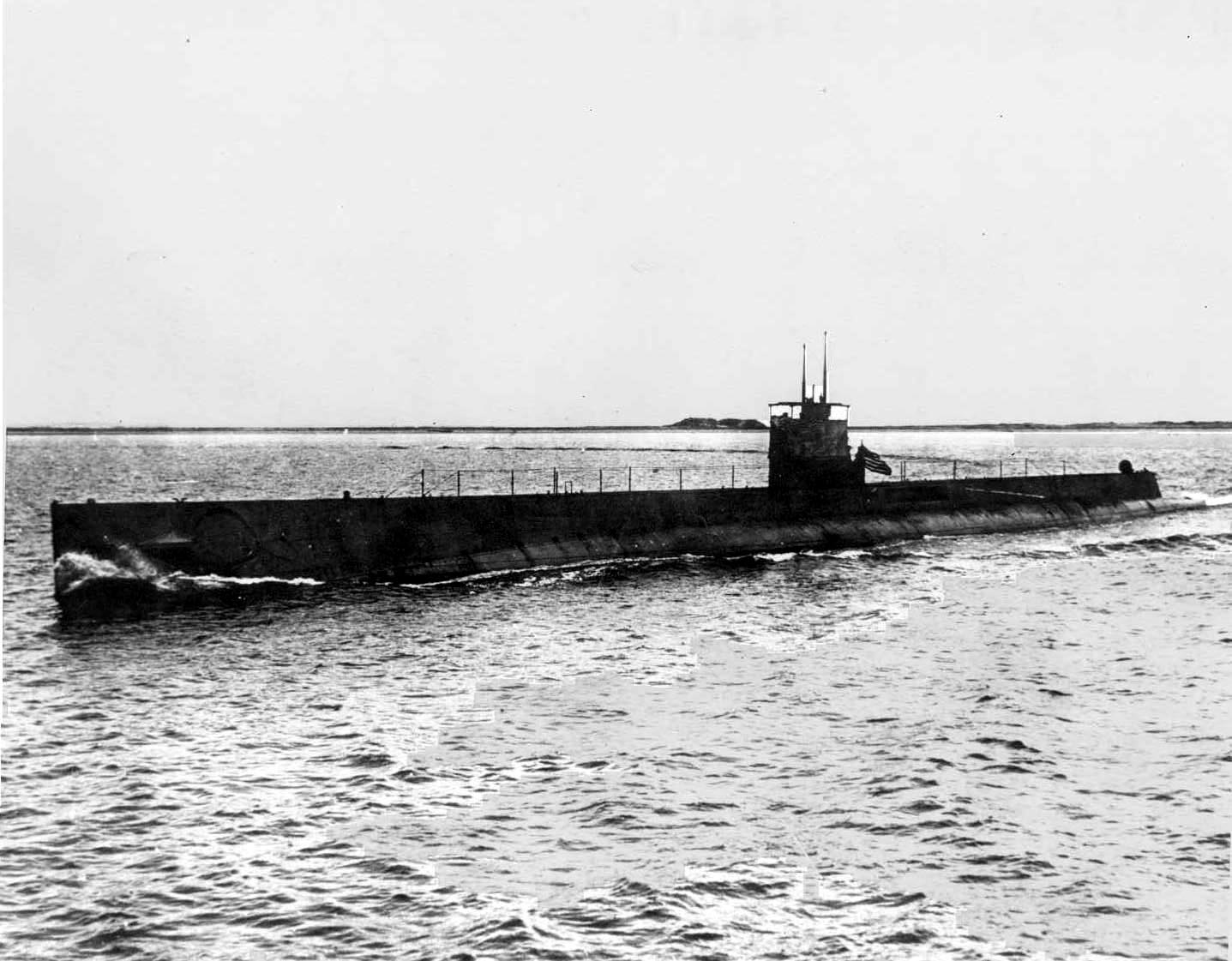
- USS T-1 (SS-52)

History

United States
- Name: AA-1
- Builder: Fore River Shipyard
- Laid down: 21 June 1916
- Launched: 25 July 1918
- Commissioned: 30 January 1920
- Decommissioned: 5 December 1922
- Renamed: as T-1 20 July 1920
- Stricken: 19 September 1930
- Fate: Scrapped 1931

General characteristics
- Class & type: AA-1-class diesel-electric submarine
- Displacement: 1,107 tons (1,125 t) surfaced; 1,482 tons (1,506 t) submerged
- Length: 268 ft 9 in (81.92 m)
- Beam: 22 ft 10 in (6.96 m)
- Draft: 14 ft 2 in (4.32 m) mean
- Propulsion: (as built) four New London Ship & Engine (NELSECO) four cycle six-cylinder diesels, 1,000 hp (750 kW) each, and two Electro Dynamic main motors, 675 hp (503 kW) each, direct drive; one NELSECO four cycle four-cylinder auxiliary diesel; two banks of 60 Exide batteries; (re-engined) two Maschinenfabrik Augsburg Nürnberg AG (MAN) four cycle ten-cylinder diesels, 2,350 hp (1,750 kW) each
- Speed: 20 knots (37 km/h; 23 mph) surfaced; 10.5 knots (19.4 km/h; 12.1 mph) submerged
- Range: 3,000 nmi (5,600 km; 3,500 mi) at 14 kn (26 km/h; 16 mph) on 23,602–24,092 USgal (89,412–91,268 liters) oil fuel
- Test depth: 150 ft (46 m)
- Complement: 4 officers, 5 chief petty officers, 45 enlisted
- Armament: six 18 inch (450 mm) torpedo tubes (four bow, two external, 16 torpedoes), (as built) two 3 in (76 mm)/23 caliber deck guns; (as modified) one 4 in (100 mm)/50 caliber deck gun

The first USS T-1 (SS-52/SF-1) was an AA-1-class submarine in the service of the United States Navy; T-1 was also known as Schley and AA-1.

She was laid down as USS Schley on 21 June 1916 at the Fore River Shipbuilding Company yard in Quincy, Massachusetts, by the Electric Boat Co. of New York, renamed AA-1 on 23 August 1917 to free the name Schley for a destroyer, launched on 25 July 1918, sponsored by Mrs. Lilian Hovey-King, and commissioned on 30 January 1920 at Boston, Massachusetts, with Lt. Comdr James Parker, Jr. in command.

AA-1 was one of three boats designed and constructed under a project charged with developing fleet submarines; that is, undersea boats possessing the sea-keeping qualities and endurance capability required for long-range operations, as scouts for the surface fleet. On 17 July 1920, while the submarine was being fitted-out, the Navy adopted its modern system of alpha-numeric hull numbers, and the fleet submarine was designated SF-1. On 20 September, she was renamed T-1. Thus, by the time she began active service that fall, she was known as T-1 (SF-1).

T-1's commissioned service lasted less than three years. She operated out of Hampton Roads, Virginia, training crews and conducting maneuvers along the east coast with other units of the U.S. Atlantic Fleet. Throughout the entire period, she remained a unit of Submarine Division 15. However, during her service, flaws in her design and construction—particularly in her propulsion plant—became apparent. On 5 December 1922, T-1 was placed out of commission and laid up at the Submarine Base, Hampton Roads, Va. Later, she was moved to Philadelphia, Pennsylvania. After almost eight years of inactivity, her name was struck from the Navy list on 19 September 1930. Her hulk was broken up, and the materials were sold for scrap on 20 November 1930.

== See also ==
- List of United States Navy submarines
