= Douwe Aukes-class minelayer =

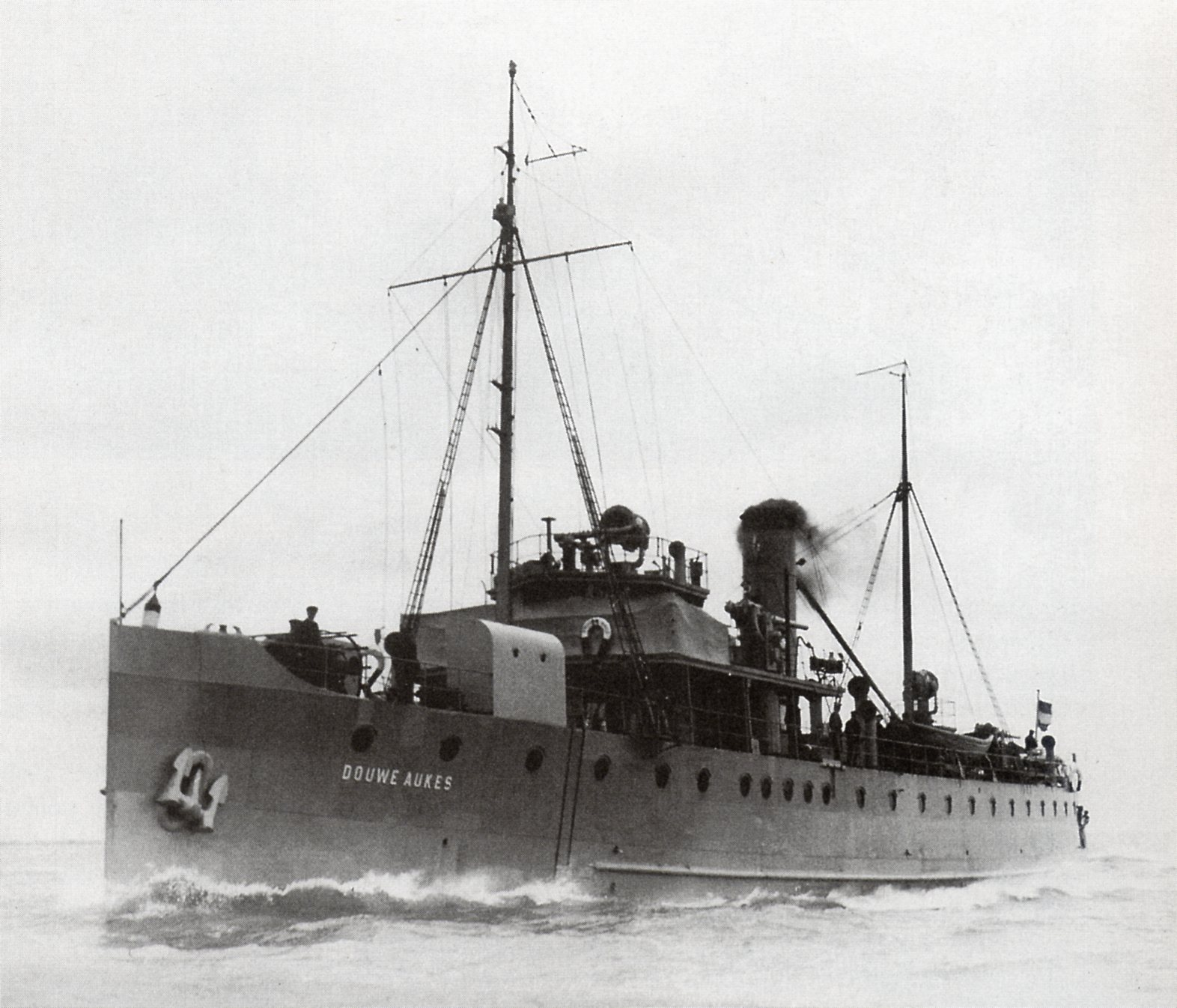
- HNLMS Douwe Aukes

Class overview
- Name: Douwe Aukes class
- Builders: Gusto, Schiedam
- Operators: Royal Netherlands Navy; Royal Navy
- Built: 1919–1922
- In commission: 1922–1960
- Completed: 2
- Lost: 1
- Retired: 1

General characteristics (as built)
- Type: Minelayer
- Displacement: 687 long tons (698 t) (standard)
- Length: 54.8 m (179 ft 9 in) (pp)
- Beam: 8.7 m (28 ft 7 in)
- Draught: 3.2 m (10 ft 6 in)
- Installed power: 2 Yarrow boilers; 746 kW (1,000 ihp)
- Propulsion: 2 shafts; 2 vertical triple expansion engines
- Speed: 13 knots (24 km/h; 15 mph)
- Endurance: 115 t (113 long tons) coal
- Complement: 60
- Armament: 3 × 75 mm (3 in) guns; 2 × 12.7 mm (0.50 in) machine guns; 60 naval mines

The Douwe Aukes class (also known as the Van Meerlant class and the Aukes class) were two minelayers built for the Royal Netherlands Navy during the 1920s. The two ships were built at the Gusto shipyard in Schiedam. Construction began in 1919 and was completed in 1922. Built to serve in the Dutch territorial waters, both ships were still in service during the Second World War and they both escaped to the United Kingdom, HNLMS Douwe Aukes on 14 May and HNLMS Van Meerlant on 18 May 1940. Both vessels were transferred to the British Royal Navy. Van Meerlant was sunk by a mine in 1941 while in British service. Douwe Aukes was returned to the Royal Netherlands Navy following the war and was used as a depot ship until sold for scrap in 1962.

== Description ==
The Douwe Aukes class was an improved version of the preceding Hydra-class minelayers. The Douwe Aukes class had a standard displacement of 687 long tons (698 t) and 748 t (736 long tons) at normal loads. They measured 54.8 metres (179 ft 9 in) long between perpendiculars with a beam of 8.7 m (28 ft 7 in) and a draught of 3.2 m (10 ft 6 in). The minelayers were powered by steam from two Yarrow boilers to two vertical triple expansion engines each turning a shaft. The system was rated at 746 kilowatts (1,000 ihp). (Note: van Willigenberg has the vessel's propulsion system at 870 kilowatts (1,170 shp).) The vessels carried 115 t (113 long tons) of coal as fuel and had a maximum speed of 13 knots (24 km/h; 15 mph). The Douwe Aukes class had a complement of 60 officers and ratings.

Both vessels were initially armed with three single-mounted 40-calibre 75 mm (3 in) semi-automatic guns and two single-mounted 12.7 mm (0.50 in) anti-aircraft (AA) machine guns. They carried 60 naval mines. Though they were larger than the Hydra class, they carried ten less mines. In British service, Douwe Aukes was converted to a convoy escort and re-armed with one 75 mm gun AA gun, two single-mounted 2-pounder guns and two 20 mm (0.8 in) cannon.

== Ships in class ==
Douwe Aukes class
Name	Builder	Launched	Commissioned	Fate
Van Meerlant	Gusto, Schiedam, Netherlands	24 November 1920	25 July 1922	Mined in Thames River estuary on 4 June 1941
Douwe Aukes	Gusto, Schiedam, Netherlands	23 February 1922	2 November 1922	Depot ship 1948, sold for scrap in 1962

== Construction and career ==
Following the end of World War I, the Dutch government created a commission to give recommendations about the future of naval planning in light of developments during the war and in the treaties that followed. The commission recommended that in the Netherlands coastal waters, Royal Netherlands Navy priority was to be given to defend approaches to river mouths as the mostly like source of attack was by land. In response to that recommendation, Van Merleent launched in 1920 and completed in 1922. Douwe Aukes was launched and completed that same year.

With the German invasion of the Netherlands in 1940, and the defeat of the nation, Douwe Aukes and Van Merleent both sailed for the United Kingdom in May. Van Merleent was transferred to British Royal Navy service on 14 March 1941. Douwe Aukes was converted to a convoy escort leader and transferred to Royal Navy service on 29 April 1941. Van Merleent did not survive much longer when on 4 June 1941, the vessel was mined and sunk in the Thames River estuary. Douwe Aukes survived the war and was returned to the Royal Netherlands Navy in 1945. In 1948, the vessel was converted to a depot ship and remained as such until scrapped in 1962.

== Sources ==
- Roberts, John (1980). "The Netherlands". In Chesneau, Roger (ed.). Conway's All the World's Fighting Ships 1922–1946. Conway Maritime Press. pp. 385–396. ISBN 0-85177-146-7.
- Sturton, Ian (1985). "Netherlands". In Gray, Randal (ed.). Conway's All the World's Fighting Ships 1906–1921. Naval Institute Press. pp. 363–371. ISBN 0-87021-907-3.
- van Willigenburg, Henk (2010). Dutch Warships of World War II. Lanasta. ISBN 978-90-8616-318-2.
