= HNLMS Medusa (1911) =

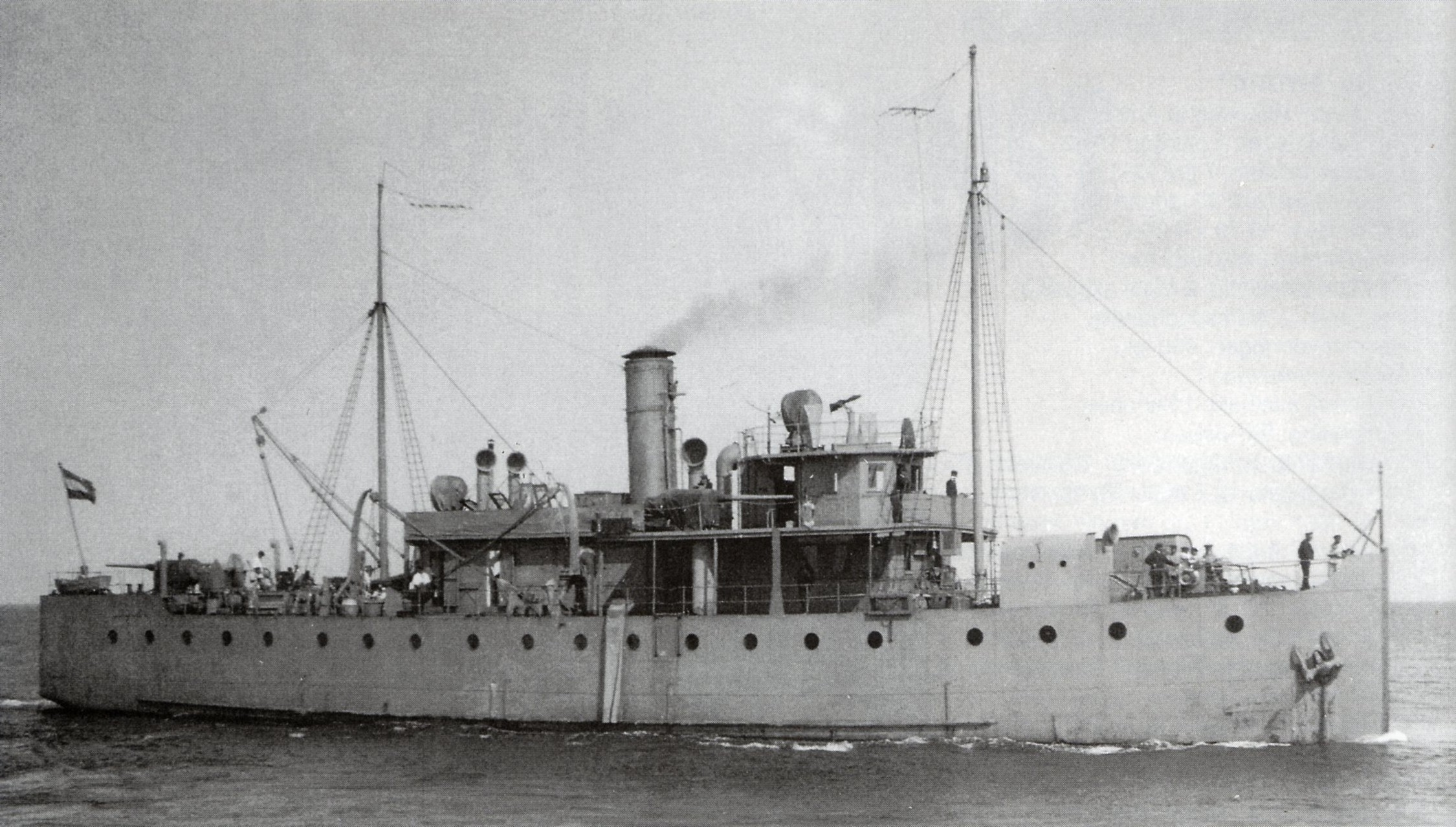
- HNLMS Medusa

History

Netherlands
- Name: HNLMS Medusa
- Namesake: Medusa
- Builder: Rijkswerf, Amsterdam
- Laid down: 12 December 1910
- Launched: 23 June 1911
- Commissioned: 20 December 1911
- Decommissioned: 5 June 1965
- Fate: Sold for scrap, 25 September 1965

General characteristics
- Class & type: Hydra-class minelayer
- Displacement: 593 t (584 long tons) standard; 657 t (647 long tons) full
- Length: 49.68 m (163 ft 0 in)
- Beam: 9.31 m (30 ft 7 in)
- Draft: 2.68 m (8 ft 10 in)
- Propulsion: 2 triple expansion engines, 800 hp (597 kW), 2 shafts
- Speed: 11 knots (20 km/h; 13 mph)
- Range: 1,440 nmi (2,670 km; 1,660 mi) at 6 kn (11 km/h; 6.9 mph)
- Complement: 59
- Armament: 2 × 75 mm (3 in) HA/LA semi-automatic guns; 1 × 75 mm (3 in) L/55 No. 2 semi-automatic gun; 2 × .50 calibre machine guns; 1 × .25 calibre machine gun; 73 sea mines

HNLMS Medusa (HW 1, A 890) was a Dutch Hydra-class minelayer, built in Amsterdam and named after Medusa in Greek mythology.

== Service history ==
In the late afternoon of 14 May 1940, under constant heavy attack, the Medusa sailed for the United Kingdom, reaching The Downs the following day. She was first stationed at Falmouth alongside the two ships of the Douwe Aukes class before being transferred to Holyhead on 31 July 1940 to be the tender to the Dutch depot ship Stuyvesant. After the war the Medusa remained in the UK until 15 January 1946, before returning to the Netherlands to provide accommodation and training facilities for the Mine Service. She was officially decommissioned on 5 June 1965, being sold for scrap the following 25 September to the Jos Desmedt yard in Antwerp.
