= HNLMS K VIII =

Royal Netherlands Navy submarine

Coordinates: 32°8′31″S 115°45′32″E

History

Netherlands
- Name: HNLMS K VIII
- Ordered: 27 June 1917
- Builder: Koninklijke Maatschappij de Schelde, Vlissingen
- Yard number: 167
- Laid down: 31 October 1917
- Launched: 28 March 1922
- Commissioned: 15 September 1922
- Decommissioned: 18 May 1942
- Stricken: 27 August 1942
- Fate: Stripped and abandoned 1943; Destroyed, 1957

General characteristics
- Class & type: K VIII-class submarine
- Displacement: Surfaced: 528 t (582 short tons) standard; 592 t (653 short tons) full load; Submerged: 726 t (801 short tons) standard; 823 t (907 short tons) full load
- Length: 64.41 m (211 ft 4 in)
- Beam: 5.6 m (18 ft 4 in)
- Draught: 3.55 m (11 ft 8 in)
- Propulsion: 2 × 671 kW (900 hp) 8-cylinder MAN 2-stroke diesel engines; 2 × 149 kW (200 hp) electric motors; 2 shafts
- Speed: Surfaced: 16 kn (30 km/h; 18 mph); Submerged: 8 kn (15 km/h; 9.2 mph)
- Range: Surfaced: 3,500 nmi (6,500 km; 4,000 mi) at 11 kn (20 km/h; 13 mph); Submerged: 25 nmi (46 km; 29 mi) at 8 kn (15 km/h; 9.2 mph)
- Test depth: 50 m (160 ft)
- Complement: 31
- Armament: 4 × 450 mm (17.7 in) torpedo tubes (2 bow, 2 stern); 10 × Type III 45 cm (18 in) torpedoes; 1 × 88 mm (3.5 in) deck gun; 1 × 12.7 mm (0.50 in) machine gun

HNLMS K VIII was one of the three K VIII-class submarines of the Royal Netherlands Navy, built to serve as patrol vessel for the Dutch colonies. Launched in 1922 the boat saw service at the start of World War II, before being decommissioned in 1942.

== Ship history ==
K VIII was ordered by the Dutch Ministry of Colonies from the shipyard Koninklijke Maatschappij de Schelde at Vlissingen on 27 June 1917, laid down on 31 October 1917, but not launched until 28 March 1922.

On 18 September 1922, K VIII began the journey to the Dutch East Indies. During this passage, the ship was accompanied by the submarines K II and K VII and the submarine supply vessel Pelikaan. The convoy sailed from the port of Vlissingen, and called at Tunisia, Gibraltar, Alexandria, Aden, Colombo and Sabang, before arriving at Tanjung Priok on 24 December.

=== World War II ===
On the outbreak of the war with Japan, K VIII was in Surabaya, held in reserve. In January 1942 K VIII was deployed with the crew from K XIII which had been damaged due to a battery explosion. K VIII patrolled the Java Sea and the Madura Strait, but made no attacks on enemy ships. After the invasion of Java by the Japanese armed forces K VIII fled to Fremantle.

After K VIII arrived in Fremantle, the crew was sent to the United Kingdom to man new submarines. Because of the age and the resulting lack of a crew, it was decided to decommission K VIII on 18 May 1942.

=== Fate ===
K VIII's batteries were salvaged to replace those in K IX. After further stripping in 1943 the hull was towed south into Cockburn Sound where it was to be beached in Jervoise Bay and broken-up. While under tow, however, the hulk foundered 100 metres (330 ft) offshore and was abandoned. The hulk remained there until 1957 when it was declared a navigational hazard for shipping using the new Kwinana Oil Refinery, and was destroyed with explosives. The brass conning tower was installed on Fremantle Harbour pilot boat Lady Forrest.
