= K V-class submarine =

Class of three patrol submarines of the Royal Netherlands Navy

The K V class was a class of three patrol submarines built by the Fijenoord shipyard in Rotterdam for the Royal Netherlands Navy. Designed specifically for colonial service, all three boats spent most of their careers on patrol duty in the waters of the Dutch East Indies. Only K VII remained in active service when the Second World War began for the Netherlands in May 1940, and she was ultimately destroyed by a Japanese air raid on Soerabaja harbour on 18 February 1942.

== Design and specifications ==
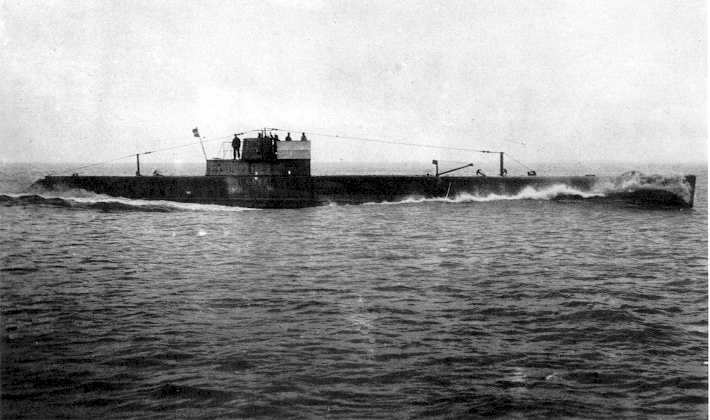
HNLMS K II, a Dutch K II-class submarine built by Fijenoord — visually representative of the K-series colonial patrol submarines.

The K V class were medium-sized diesel-electric patrol submarines optimised for extended colonial service in tropical waters. Their surfaced displacement was 569 tons and submerged displacement 649 tons, with dimensions of 57.31 m (188.0 ft) length, 5.60 m (18.4 ft) beam, and 3.82 m (12.5 ft) draught.

Propulsion was provided by two Sulzer six-cylinder diesel engines developing a combined 1,200 hp (890 kW) on the surface and two electric motors producing 400 hp (300 kW) for submerged running, giving speeds of 13.5 knots surfaced and 8 knots submerged. The class had a cruising range of 3,500 nmi (6,500 km) at 11 knots on the surface and 25 nmi (46 km) at 8 knots when submerged.

The armament consisted of six 450 mm (18 in) torpedo tubes — two in the bow, two in the stern, and one external twin-tube mount amidships — and a single 75 mm (3.0 in) deck gun for surface engagements. Maximum diving depth was 40 m (130 ft) and complement was 31 men.

== Construction ==
All three submarines were laid down at the Fijenoord shipyard in Rotterdam in 1916 and completed between 1920 and 1922.

Name	Laid down	Launched	Commissioned	Fate
K V	4 April 1916	20 November 1919	15 September 1920	Decommissioned August 1937
K VI	4 April 1916	23 December 1920	11 October 1921	Decommissioned August 1937
K VII	25 July 1916	8 March 1921	5 September 1922	Destroyed by Japanese air raid, Soerabaja, 18 February 1942

== Service history ==
=== Peacetime colonial service ===
Following commissioning, all three submarines were assigned to the Dutch East Indies station, where they patrolled colonial waters alongside other K-class boats. K V and K VI were decommissioned in August 1937 after having served for approximately fifteen to sixteen years in tropical colonial conditions.

=== World War II: fate of K VII ===
K VII was the only unit of the class still in service when Japan declared war on the Netherlands in December 1941. By that time she was in reserve at Soerabaja (Surabaya), Java. On 18 February 1942 — the same day Japanese bombers also sank the coastal defence vessel Soerabaja — the K VII was destroyed during a Japanese air raid on Soerabaja harbour. At the time of the attack, the boat had been submerged in the harbour in an attempt to protect her from bombing; she was struck by a direct hit and all aboard were killed.

== See also ==
- K XI-class submarine
- Royal Netherlands Navy
- Dutch East Indies
- Dutch submarines in World War II
