= USS T-2 (SS-60) =

Submarine of the United States

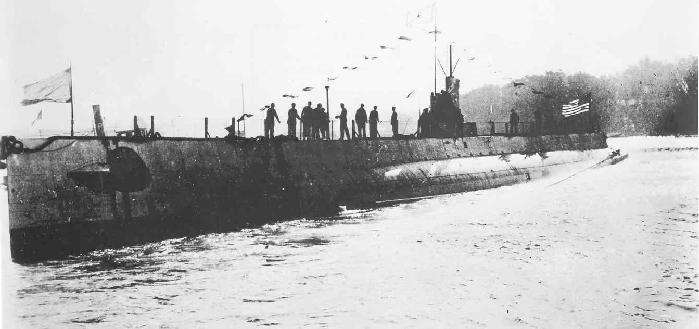
- USS AA-2, later renamed USS T-2, being launched at the Fore River Shipbuilding Company at Quincy, Massachusetts, on 6 September 1919.

History

United States
- Name: AA-2
- Builder: Fore River Shipyard
- Laid down: 31 May 1917
- Launched: 6 September 1919
- Commissioned: 7 January 1922
- Decommissioned: 16 July 1923
- Renamed: T-2 22 September 1920
- Stricken: 19 September 1930
- Fate: Scrapped 1931

General characteristics (as built)
- Type: AA-1-class submarine
- Displacement: 1,106 long tons (1,124 t) surfaced; 1,487 long tons (1,511 t) submerged
- Length: 268 ft 9 in (81.9 m)
- Beam: 22 ft 8 in (6.9 m)
- Draft: 15 ft 2 in (4.6 m)
- Installed power: 4,000 bhp (3,000 kW) (diesel); 1,500 hp (1,100 kW) (electric)
- Propulsion: 4 × diesel engines; 2 × electric motors
- Speed: 20 knots (37 km/h; 23 mph) surfaced; 10.5 knots (19.4 km/h; 12.1 mph) submerged
- Range: 3,000 nmi (5,600 km; 3,500 mi) at 11 knots (20 km/h; 13 mph) on the surface; 100 nmi (190 km; 120 mi) at 5 knots (9.3 km/h; 5.8 mph) submerged
- Test depth: 160 feet (48.8 m)
- Complement: 54 officers and enlisted men
- Armament: 4 × bow 18 inch (450 mm) torpedo tubes; 2 × external 18-inch torpedo tubes (broadside); 2 × 3-inch (76 mm) deck gun

USS T-2 (SS-60) was an AA-1-class submarine built for the United States Navy during World War I.

== Construction and career ==
The boat was laid down as AA-2 on 31 May 1917 at the Fore River Shipbuilding Company yard in Quincy, Massachusetts, by the Electric Boat Co. of New York, launched on 6 September 1919, sponsored by Miss Madeline Everett, redesignated SF-2 on 17 July 1920, renamed T-2 on 22 September 1920, and placed in commission at the Boston Navy Yard on 7 January 1922.

T-2 was the last of three T-boats placed in commission and served actively for only 18 months. Her unique mission was long-range scouting and reconnaissance for the surface fleet. Like her sister ships, she operated in Submarine Division 15, training crews and conducting maneuvers with the Atlantic Fleet. By the fall of 1922, design and construction flaws in the three T-boats had become apparent. As a result, T-2 was decommissioned on 16 July 1923 at the Submarine Base at Hampton Roads, Virginia, and was placed in reserve there. Later, she was moved to Philadelphia. Following seven years of inactivity, T-2 was stricken from the Navy list on 19 September 1930. She was broken up and her metal was sold for scrap on 20 November 1930.
