= Hydra-class minelayer =

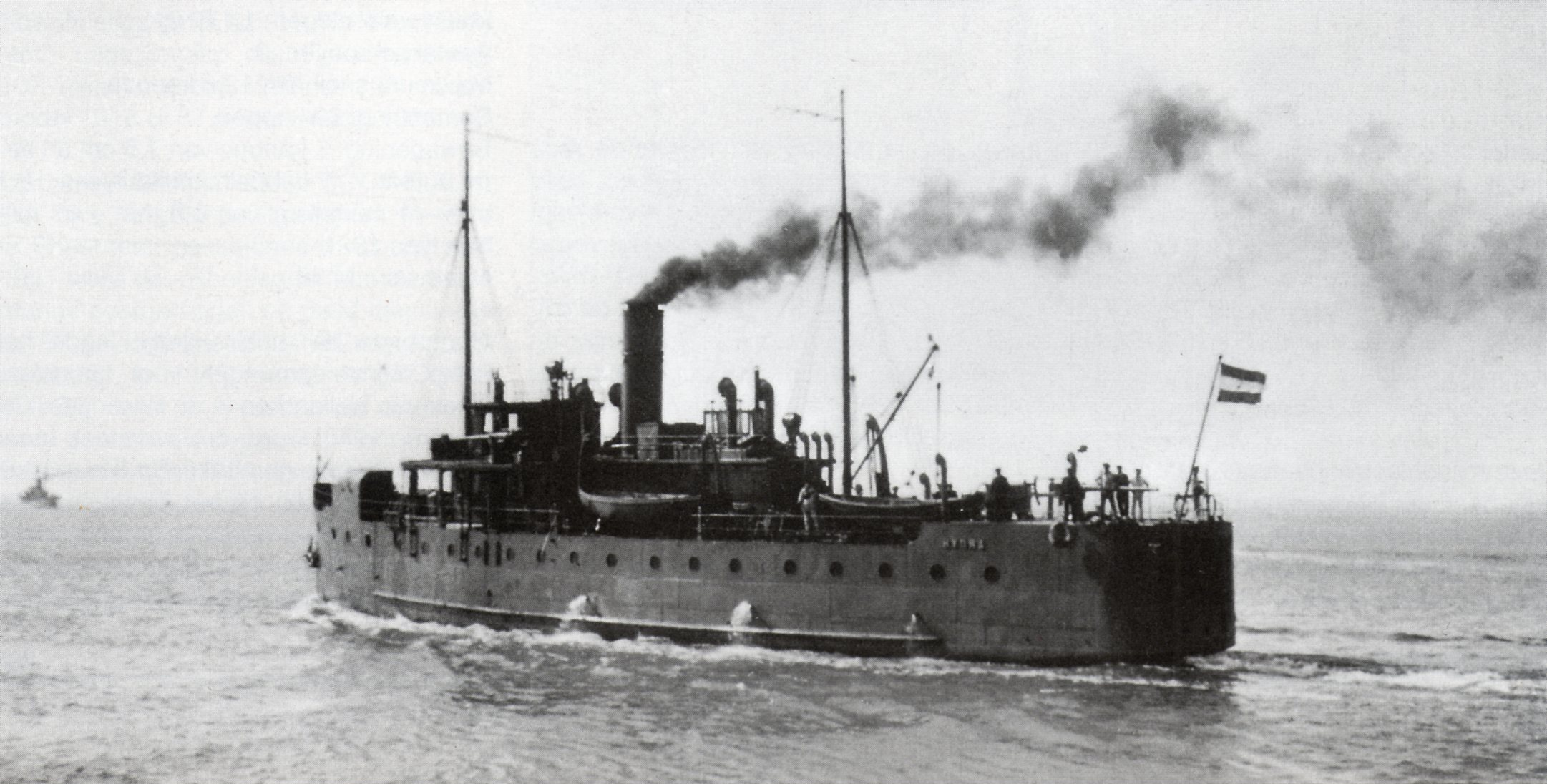
- HNLMS Hydra

Class overview
- Name: Hydra class
- Builders: Rijkswerf, Amsterdam
- Operators: Royal Netherlands Navy
- Built: 1910–1912
- In commission: 1911–1964
- Completed: 2
- Lost: 1

General characteristics
- Type: Minelayer
- Displacement: 593 t (584 long tons) standard; 657 t (647 long tons) full
- Length: 49.7 m (163 ft 1 in)
- Propulsion: 800 hp (600 kW) engine
- Speed: 11 knots (20 km/h; 13 mph)
- Complement: 59
- Armament: Hydra: 3 × 75 mm (3 in) guns (3×1); 2 × .50 calibre machine guns; 70 naval mines; Medusa: 2 × 75 mm (3 in) HA/LA semi-automatic guns; 1 × 75 mm (3 in) L/55 No. 2 semi-automatic gun; 2 × .50 calibre machine guns; 1 × .25 calibre machine gun; 73 naval mines

The Hydra class were two minelayers of the Royal Netherlands Navy, built to serve in the Dutch East Indies and Dutch territorial waters in Europe. The construction of the ships began in 1910 and was completed in 1912. The ships were built by the navy yard (Rijkswerf) in Amsterdam. Both ships were still in service during the Second World War. Only Medusa escaped to the United Kingdom, however. Hydra was lost after the ship was fired on by an anti-tank weapon. The minelayer sank in the waters off Zeeland.

== Ships in class ==
- HNLMS Hydra (1912) (1912–1940)
- HNLMS Medusa (1911) (1911–1964)

== Sources ==
- netherlandsnavy.nl Hydra-class minelayers
