= HNLMS K VII =

History

Netherlands
- Name: K VII
- Builder: Fijenoord, Rotterdam
- Laid down: 25 July 1916
- Launched: 8 March 1921
- Commissioned: 5 September 1922
- Decommissioned: 18 February 1942
- Fate: Sunk, 18 February 1942

General characteristics
- Type: K V-class submarine
- Displacement: 560 long tons (570 t) (surfaced); 640 long tons (650 t) (submerged)
- Length: 188 ft (57.3 m)
- Beam: 16 ft 9 in (5.1 m)
- Draft: 12 ft 6 in (3.8 m)}
- Propulsion: 2 × 600 bhp (447 kW) diesel engines; 2 × 200 bhp (149 kW) electric motors
- Speed: 13.5 knots (25.0 km/h; 15.5 mph) (surfaced); 8 kn (15 km/h; 9.2 mph) (submerged)
- Range: 3,500 nmi (6,500 km; 4,000 mi) at 11 knots (20 km/h; 13 mph) (surfaced); 13 nmi (24 km; 15 mi) at 8 kn (15 km/h; 9.2 mph) (submerged)
- Test depth: 132 ft (40 m)
- Complement: 31
- Armament: 2 × 17.7 in (450 mm) bow torpedo tubes; 2 × 17.7 in (450 mm) stern torpedo tubes; 2 × 17.7 in (450 mm) external traversing torpedo tubes; 1 x 3 in (76 mm) deck gun; 1 x 0.5 in (13 mm) machine gun

K VII was a K V-class patrol submarine built for the Royal Netherlands Navy during the 1920s for colonial service. Completed in 1922, the boat spent the bulk of her career in the Dutch East Indies. After the start of the Pacific War in December 1941, she was sunk during a Japanese air raid on Surabaya harbor in early 1942.

== Design and description ==
The K V-class submarines were designed to patrol the waters of the Dutch East Indies. The boats had a length of 188 feet (57.3 m) overall, a beam of 16 feet 9 inches (5.1 m) and a draft of 12 feet 6 inches (3.8 m). They displaced 560 long tons (570 t) on the surface and 640 long tons (650 t) submerged. The submarines had a crew of 31 officers and enlisted men.

For surface running, the boats were powered by two 600-brake-horsepower (447 kW) Sulzer diesel engines, each driving one propeller shaft. When submerged each propeller was driven by a 200-horsepower (149 kW) electric motor. They could reach 13.5 knots (25.0 km/h; 15.5 mph) on the surface and 8 knots (15 km/h; 9.2 mph) underwater. On the surface, the boats had a range of 3,500 nautical miles (6,500 km; 4,000 mi) at 13 knots (24 km/h; 15 mph) and 13 nmi (24 km; 15 mi) at 8 knots (15 km/h; 9.2 mph) submerged. The submarines had a diving depth of 132 feet (40 m).

The K V class was armed with six 17.7-inch (450 mm) torpedo tubes. Two of these were in the bow and two tubes in the stern. The other pair were on a rotating mount amidships. They were also armed with a 3-inch (76 mm) deck gun and a 0.5-inch (12.7 mm) machine gun.

== Construction and career ==
K VII was ordered on 29 November 1915 and laid down on 25 July 1916 at the shipyard of Fijenoord in Rotterdam. The submarine was launched on 8 March 1921 and completed on 5 September 1922.

=== World War II ===
At the time of the declaration of war with Japan in December 1941, the boat was in Surabaya, Java, where it was kept in reserve. On 18 February 1942 K VII was destroyed in a Japanese Airstrike on Surabaya harbor. At the time of the bombing, the boat was submerged in the harbor in an attempt to save the ship from destruction. The submarine was struck by a direct hit and all aboard died in the attack.

== Bibliography ==
- Bagnasco, Erminio (2018) [1977]. Submarines of World War Two: Design, Development and Operations. Naval Institute Press. ISBN 978-1-68247-384-9.
- Lenton, H.T. (1968). Royal Netherlands Navy. Navies of the Second World War. Macdonald & Co.
- Mark, Chris (1997). Schepen van de Koninklijke Marine in W.O. II (in Dutch). Alkmaar: De Alk. ISBN 90-6013-522-9.
- Noppen, Ryan K. (2020). The Royal Netherlands Navy of World War II. New Vanguard. Vol. 285. Osprey Publishing. ISBN 978-1-4728-4191-9.
- van Willigenburg, Henk (2010). Dutch Warships of World War II. Lanasta. ISBN 978-90-8616-318-2.
