= HMAS K9 =

Submarine

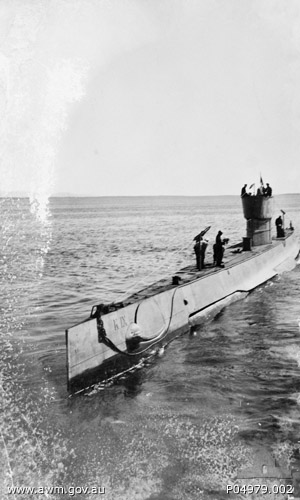
- HMAS K9 in 1943

History

Netherlands
- Name: K IX
- Ordered: 27 June 1917
- Launched: 23 December 1922
- Commissioned: 21 June 1923
- Decommissioned: 25 July 1942
- Fate: transferred to RAN

History

Australia
- Name: K9
- Commissioned: 22 June 1943
- Decommissioned: 31 March 1944
- Reclassified: Training vessel (1942); Oil carrier (1944)
- Fate: Stranded on Fiona Beach, NSW 8 June 1945

General characteristics
- Type: Submarine
- Length: 210 ft (64 m)
- Beam: 18 ft (5.5 m)
- Draught: 12 ft (3.7 m)
- Propulsion: 2 shaft diesel electric; Sulzer diesels 1500 hp; electric motor 630 hp
- Speed: 15 knots (28 km/h) surfaced; 8 knots (15 km/h) submerged
- Range: 3,500 nautical miles (6,500 km) at 11 knots (20 km/h) surfaced; 25 nautical miles (46 km) at 8 knots (15 km/h) submerged
- Complement: 31
- Armament: 4 × 450 mm (18 in) torpedo tubes (2 bow, 2 stern); 1 × 88 mm (3.5 in) gun; 1 × 12.7-millimetre (0.50 in)machine gun

HMAS K9 (formerly Dutch submarine K IX) was a submarine that served with the Royal Netherlands Navy and the Royal Australian Navy.

== Construction ==
K IX was ordered on 27 June 1917, launched on 23 December 1922 and commissioned into the Royal Netherlands Navy on 21 June 1923.

== Operational history ==
=== Royal Netherlands Navy ===
K IX was based in the Netherlands East Indies from 13 May 1924. By the outbreak of the Pacific War in 1941, K IX was out of commission but was returned to active service in March 1942. Following the fall of the Netherlands East Indies K IX escaped to Fremantle, Western Australia, arriving on 13 March 1942.

=== Transfer to Australia ===
In May 1942 the Dutch government offered K IX to the Royal Australian Navy for use in anti-submarine warfare training. This offer was accepted and K IX arrived in Sydney for repairs on 12 May. On 1 June K IX was damaged by a torpedo explosion during the attack on Sydney Harbour. K IX was decommissioned from the Royal Netherlands Navy on 25 July 1942 and following extensive repairs was commissioned into the Royal Australian Navy as HMAS K9 on 22 June 1943.

Due to the boat's poor mechanical condition HMAS K9 saw little service with the RAN and spent most of her time in commission under repair. K9 was badly damaged by a battery explosion on 22 January 1944. Due to a lack of spare parts the submarine was decommissioned on 31 March 1944, having spent only 31 days at sea. Following her decommissioning K9 re-entered Dutch service as an oil lighter. K9 was washed ashore near Seal Rocks, New South Wales on 8 June 1945 while under tow to Merauke in Dutch New Guinea and subsequently stripped for scrap.

The remnants of K9 were located on 20 July 1999 by the New South Wales Government's Heritage Office. The beach on which it grounded and its remnants remain is known as Submarine Beach.
