= List of vessels built by Matthew Turner =

The following is a list of 272 vessels built for or directly by Matthew Turner between 1848 and 1904.

The vessel types include: schooner (203), steamer (22), sloop (19), brigantine (4), half brigantine (13), barkentine (4), tug (4), barge (3), and yawl (1). The vessels were built at: Benicia, California (187); San Francisco, California (78), Eureka, California (6), and Geneva Indian Creek (1).

Vessel Name	Date	Type, Tonnage, LOD	Original Owner	Shipyard / Location	Notes	Image
George R. Roberts	1848	Schooner, 75 tons	Matthew Turner	Geneva Indian Creek		
Nautilus	1868 Nov 18; 1868 Apr	Half-brigantine, 260 tons, 115' LOD, 26' beam, 10.6' draft; SrBg, 173 (BRT)	Matthew Turner; M. Turner, San Francisco	E.B Cousins Shipyard Eureka, CA; Built for Turner at E.B Cousins Shipyard Eureka, California, under H.D. Bendixsen	Nautilus - 104 t., 173 ton brig, fast passage from Tahiti to San Francisco of 20 days.	
Island Belle	1871 Jan 19; 1872	Schooner, 41.86 tons, 66' LOD, 15' beam; Sr, 41 (BRT)	Tahiti trade; Partenreederei (M. Turner), San Francisco	B. F. Webster Shipyard, Mission Bay San Francisco; Built for Turner at Brickyard Point, San Francisco, under B. F. Webster		
Stella	1872 Feb 1; 1872 Feb	Schooner, 49 tons, 75' LOD, 20.6' beam, 6' draft; Sr, 49 (BRT)	Tahiti trade; Partenreederei (M. Turner), San Francisco	Cutten & McDonald's Shipyard Eureka, CA; Built for Turner at E.B Cousins Shipyard Eureka, California, under H.D. Bendixsen		
Marion	1872 July 10; 1872 Jul	Schooner, 48 tons, 75' LOD, 20.6' beam, 6' draft; Sr, 48 (BRT)	Tahiti trade; Partenreederei (M. Turner), San Francisco	E.B Cousins Shipyard Eureka, CA; Built for Turner at E.B Cousins Shipyard Eureka, California, under H.D. Bendixsen		
Mary	1872 Nov 23; 1872 Nov	Schooner, 49 tons, 123' LOD, 31.8' beam; Sr, 49 (BRT)	Tahiti trade; Partenreederei (M. Turner), franz. Flagge	Cutten & McDonald's Shipyard Eureka, CA; Built for Turner at E.B Cousins Shipyard Eureka, California, under H.D. Bendixsen		
Atalanta	1872 Dec 27; 1872 Oct	Schooner, 49 tons; Sr, 49 (BRT)	Tahiti trade; Partenreederei (M. Turner), San Francisco	E.B Cousins Shipyard Eureka, CA; Built for Turner at E.B Cousins Shipyard Eureka, California, under H.D. Bendixsen		
Francaise	1874 Nov 1; 1874 Nov	Schooner, 70 tons; Sr, 49 (BRT)	French Polynesia; Partenreederei (M. Turner), San Francisco	E.B Cousins Shipyard Eureka, CA; Built for Turner at E.B Cousins Shipyard Eureka, California, under H.D. Bendixsen		
Siberia	1875 March; 1875 Mar	Brigantine, steam-screw, 126 tons, 74' LOD, 23' beam; SrBgD, 126 (BRT)	Lindholm & Co. Vladivostok, Russia; Lindholm & Co., Vladivostok/Russia	B. F. Webster Shipyard Mission Bay San Francisco; Built for Turner at Brickyard Point, San Francisco, under B. F. Webster		
Aiata or Alata	1875 May 4; 1875 May	Schooner, 60 tons; Sr, 55 (BRT)	Turner, Chapman & Co. Hawaii; Turner, Chapman & Co., Honolulu/Hawaii	Mission Bay San Francisco; Mission Creek, Channel Street, San Francisco		
Marie	1875 May 4; 1875	Schooner, 25 tons; Sr, 30 (BRT)	John Pinet, Tahiti trade; Ausland	Mission Bay San Francisco; Mission Creek, Channel Street, San Francisco		
Mabel Scott	1875 July 22; 1875 Jul	Schooner, 76.6 tons, 81.7' LOD, 22.7' beam, 7.8' draft; Sr, 77 (BRT)	Turner & Rundle, Tahiti trade; Stephen Higgins & Co., San Francisco	Mission Bay San Francisco; Mission Creek, Channel Street, San Francisco		
Theodore H. Allen	1875 Sept 15; 1875 Sep	Schooner, pilot, 48.31 tons, 67.5' LOD, 20' beam, 8' draft; LoSr, 48 (BRT)	San Francisco Bar Pilots; San Francisco Bar Pilots	Mission Bay San Francisco; Mission Creek, Channel Street, San Francisco		
Colorado	1875 Oct 18; 1875	Sloop, 20 tons, 47' LOD, 15.5' beam, 5.3' draft; Slp, 20 (BRT)	Commodore Isadore Gutte; USA	Mission Bay San Francisco; Mission Creek, Channel Street, San Francisco		
Namalole	1875; 1875 Jul	Schooner, 59 tons; Sr, 59 (BRT)	Benj Greaves; USA	Mission Bay San Francisco; Mission Creek, Channel Street, San Francisco		
Bella	1876 Mar 15; 1876	Schooner, 34 tons, 58' LOD, 34.8' beam, 5.3' draft; Sr, 34 (BRT)	Alaska Commercial Company; USA	Mission Bay San Francisco; Mission Creek, Channel Street, San Francisco		
Eudora	1876 Mar 15; 1876 Mar	Schooner, 73 tons, 80' LOD, 22.4' beam, 8' draft; Sr, 73 (BRT)	Alaska Commercial Company; Alaska Comm. Co., San Francisco	Mission Bay San Francisco; Mission Creek, Channel Street, San Francisco		
Dagmar	1876 March; 1876 Mar	Schooner, 60 tons, 79' LOD, 22.8' beam, 6.5' draft; Sr, 60 (BRT)	Hutchinson & Co. Petropavlovsk, Russia; Hutchinson & Co., Petropavlovsk/Russia	Mission Bay San Francisco; Mission Creek, Channel Street, San Francisco		
Salvatierra or Salvatierre	1876 Apr 14; 1876 May	Schooner, 64.19 tons, 79' LOD, 22.8' beam, 5.5' draft; Sr, 64 (BRT)	Commodore Isadore Gutte; I. Gutte, San Francisco	Mission Bay San Francisco; Mission Creek, Channel Street, San Francisco		
Nagay	1876 July 22; 1876	Schooner, 20.19 tons, 48.5' LOD, 16.5' beam, 5.6' draft; Sr, 20 (BRT)	T. W. McCollum; USA	Mission Bay San Francisco; Mission Creek, Channel Street, San Francisco		
Unga	1876 July 22; 1876	Schooner, 24 tons, 48.5 LOD, 16.5' beam, 5.6' draft; Sr, 24 (BRT)	T. W. McCollum; USA	Mission Bay San Francisco; Mission Creek, Channel Street, San Francisco		
Lalla Rookh	1876 Sept 2	Schooner, yacht, 59' LOD, 18' beam, 4.5' draft	Governor Romualdo Pacheco	Mission Bay San Francisco		
Pearl	1876 Sept; 1876 Jun	Schooner yacht, 60' LOD, 18' beam, 4.5' draft; SrYt, 28 (BRT)	Commodore John L. Eckley; Cpt. Eckley, San Francisco	Mission Bay San Francisco; Mission Creek, Channel Street, San Francisco		
Alexander	1877 Feb 27; 1877 Feb	Schooner, 52.12 tons, 58' LOD, 22' beam, 7.2' draft; Sr, 52 (BRT)	Liebes Brothers, San Francisco; Liebes Bros., San Francisco	Mission Bay San Francisco; Mission Creek, Channel Street, San Francisco		
Consuelo	1877 Sept 2; 1876 Sep	Schooner, yacht, 25.64 tons, 56' LOD, 18' beam, 4.25' draft; SrYt, 25 (BRT)	Commodore Isadore Gutte; I. Gutte, San Francisco	Mission Bay San Francisco; Mission Creek, Channel Street, San Francisco		
Haleakala	1877 Oct 1; 1877 Sep	Schooner, 55 tons, 75' LOD, 23' beam, 8' draft; Sr, 55 (BRT)	Allen & Robinson, Hawaii; Allen & Robinson, Honolulu/Hawaii	Mission Bay San Francisco; Mission Creek, Channel Street, San Francisco		
Mathew Turner or Matthew Turner	1877 Nov 20; 1877 Nov	Schooner, 75.03 tons, 85' LOD, 23' beam, 7.1' draft; Sr, 76 (BRT)	Commodore Isadore Gutte; I. Gutte & Co., San Francisco	Mission Bay San Francisco; Mission Creek, Channel Street, San Francisco		
Vladimir	1878 Feb 16; 1878	Schooner, steam-aux, 71.03 tons, 77' LOD, 21.7' beam, 7' draft; Sr, 71 (BRT)	Lindholm & Co. Vladivostok, Russia; Lindholm & Co., Vladivostok/Russia	Mission Bay San Francisco; Mission Creek, Channel Street, San Francisco		
Leon	1878 Apr 10; 1878 Apr	Schooner, 67.41 tons, 76' LOD, 21.2' beam, 7.3' draft; Sr, 64 (BRT)	Alaska Commercial Company; Alaska Comm. Co., San Francisco	Mission Bay San Francisco; Mission Creek, Channel Street, San Francisco		
Marguerita	1878 Apr 24; 1878	Sloop yacht, 20.21 tons, 53' LOD, 15' beam, 4.5' draft; ScSlp, 21 (BRT)	Commodore Isadore Gutte; USA	Mission Bay San Francisco; Mission Creek, Channel Street, San Francisco		
Rosario	1878 May 2; 1878 May	Schooner, 148.65 tons, 99' LOD, 26.6' beam, 9' draft; Sr, 148 (BRT)	Lewis L. Bradburry & Co. San Francisco; Bradburry & Co., San Francisco	Mission Bay San Francisco; Mission Creek, Channel Street, San Francisco		
Ester Cobos or Esther Cobos	1878 June 1; 1878	Schooner scow, 58.21 tons, 72' LOD, 22' beam, 5.3' draft; Sr, 58 (BRT)	Carroll & Co. San Francisco; Carroll & Co., San Francisco	Mission Bay San Francisco; Mission Creek, Channel Street, San Francisco		
St. George	1878 July 13; 1878 Jul	Schooner, 100.41 tons, 91' LOD, 24.7' beam, 8.3' draft; Sr, 101 (BRT)	Alaska Commercial Company; Alaska Comm. Co., San Francisco	Mission Bay San Francisco; Mission Creek, Channel Street, San Francisco		
Flora	1878 Aug 18; 1878	Schooner, 44 tons; Sr, 41 (BRT)	Papeete, Tahiti; USA	Mission Bay San Francisco; Mission Creek, Channel Street, San Francisco		
Rescue	1878 Aug 27; 1878	Schooner, pilot, 70.46 tons, 78' LOD, 22.8' beam, 7.2' draft, price $8,000; LoSr, 70 (BRT)	Columbia River Bar Pilots, Astoria, Washington; Columbia River Bar Pilots, Astoria, Washington	Mission Bay San Francisco; Mission Creek, Channel Street, San Francisco		
Lillian	1878 Oct 9; 1878 Oct	Schooner, 70 tons; Sr, 70 (BRT)	Johnsen, Tahiti; Johnsen, Tahiti	Mission Bay San Francisco; Mission Creek, Channel Street, San Francisco		
St. Paul	1879 Feb 1	Steamer, 26' LOD	Alaska Commercial Company	Mission Bay San Francisco		
Ounalaska	1879 April 14; 1879 Apr	Schooner, 54.42 tons, 70' LOD, 22.2' beam, 6.8' draft; Sr, 55 (BRT)	Western Fur and Trading Co.; Western Trading & Fur Co., San Francisco	Mission Bay San Francisco; Mission Creek, Channel Street, San Francisco		
Claus Spreckels	1879 June 12; 1879 Jun	Brigantine, 246.62 tons, 122.5' LOD, 31.8' beam, 10.5' draft; SrBg, 247 (BRT)	John D. Spreckels Oceanic S.S. Co.; Spreckels Bros., San Francisco	Mission Bay San Francisco; Mission Creek, Channel Street, San Francisco		
La Mangarevienne	1879 June 25	Schooner, 72 tons	French Polynesia	Mission Bay San Francisco		
Dolly	1879 July 13; 1879 Jul	Schooner, 42 tons; Sr, 42 (BRT)	Stephen Higgins, Tahiti; Stephen Higgins, Tahiti	Mission Bay San Francisco; Mission Creek, Channel Street, San Francisco		
Chispa	1879 July 26; 1879	Schooner, yacht, 30.73 tons, 56.6' LOD, 18.6' beam, 4.9' draft; SrYtCB, 40 (BRT)	Commodore Isador Gutte; I. Gutte, San Francisco	Mission Bay San Francisco; Mission Creek, Channel Street, San Francisco		
Nellie	1879 Oct 11; 1880 Oct	Sloop, yacht, 14.37 tons, 43.7' LOD, 15.3' beam, 3.5' draft; SlpYtCB, 15 (BRT)	Hyde R. Bowie, San Francisco; Hyde R. Bowie, San Francisco	Mission Bay San Francisco; Mission Creek, Channel Street, San Francisco		
Manganrevienne	1879	Sr, 72 (BRT)	Leon Blum, Mangareva/Mexiko	Mission Creek, Channel Street, San Francisco		
John D. Spreckels	1880 Feb 14; 1880 Feb	Half-brigantine, 266.66 tons, 124.6' LOD, 31.2' beam, 10.9' draft; SrBg, 267 (BRT)	John D. Spreckels Oceanic S.S. Co.; Spreckels Bros., San Francisco	Mission Bay San Francisco; Mission Creek, Channel Street, San Francisco	John D. Spreckels - a 266-ton brigantine with "at least three ten day voyages on the San Francisco-Hawaiian Island run".	
Dora	1880 Apr 2; 1880 Mar	Brigantine, steam-screw, 198 tons, 112' LOD, 27.2' beam, 13.2' draft; SrBgD, 198 (BRT)	Alaska Commercial Company; Alaska Comm. Co., San Francisco	Mission Bay San Francisco; Mission Creek, Channel Street, San Francisco		
Punau	1880 Apr 2; 1880	Schooner, 42 tons; Sr, 42 (BRT)	Tahiti; Ausland	Mission Bay San Francisco; Mission Creek, Channel Street, San Francisco		
Consuelo	1880 July 23; 1880 Jul	Half-brigantine, 293.54 tons. 133.5' LOD, 31.2' beam, 11.7' draft; SrBg, 294 (BRT)	John D. Spreckels Oceanic S.S. Co.; Spreckels Bros., San Francisco	Mission Bay San Francisco; Mission Creek, Channel Street, San Francisco		
Ella	1880 Oct 2; 1880 Jul	Schooner, 43 tons; Sr, 42 (BRT)	Johanson & Co. Tahiti; Johanson & Co., Tahiti	Mission Bay San Francisco; Mission Creek, Channel Street, San Francisco		
Nellie	1880 Oct 2; 1881	Sloop yacht, 32 tons, 60' LOD; SrYtCB, 32 (BRT)	Hyde R. Bowie, San Francisco; Hyde R. Bowie, San Francisco	Mission Bay San Francisco; Mission Creek, Channel Street, San Francisco		
Lotus	1880 Nov 24; 1880 Nov	Schooner, 40 tons, 68' LOD, 16.6' beam, 5.3' draft; Sr, 42 (BRT)	F. J. Jackson, San Francisco; F.J. Lackman, San Francisco	Mission Bay San Francisco; Mission Creek, Channel Street, San Francisco		
W.H. Dimond	1881 Jan 20; 1881 Feb	Barkentine, 390.59 tons, 155' LOD, 35.5' beam, 11.75' draft; SrBk, 391 (BRT)	John D. Spreckels Oceanic S.S. Co; Spreckels Bros., San Francisco	Mission Bay San Francisco; Mission Creek, Channel Street, San Francisco	W.H. Dimond, a brigantine with a 9-day, 10-hour passage from San Francisco to Honolulu.	
Czar	1881 Feb 10; 1881 Feb	Schooner, 144.34 tons, 98' LOD, 26' beam, 97.5' draft; Sr, 144 (BRT)	Western Fur Trading Co.; Western Fur Trading Co., San Francisco	Mission Bay San Francisco; Mission Creek, Channel Street, San Francisco		
Otter	1881 Feb 15; 1881 Feb	Schooner, 73.75 tons, 81' LOD, 24.6' beam, 7.6' draft; Sr, 74 (BRT)	H. Liebes, San Francisco; H. Liebes, San Francisco	Mission Bay San Francisco; Mission Creek, Channel Street, San Francisco		
Nuhiva or Nuku Hiva	1881 Mar 16; 1881 Mar	Schooner, 75 tons, 72' LOD, 24.2' beam, 6' draft; Sr, 42 (BRT)	French Government; Franz. Regierung, Brest	Mission Bay San Francisco; Mission Creek, Channel Street, San Francisco		
Taravao	1881 Apr 3; 1881 Mar	Schooner, 75 tons, 72' LOD, 24.2' beam, 6' draft; Sr, 42 (BRT)	France Government; Franz. Regierung, Brest	Mission Bay San Francisco; Mission Creek, Channel Street, San Francisco		
Anna	1881 Apr 16; 1881 Oct	Schooner, 239.46 tons, 117' LOD, 29.5' beam, 10.6' draft; 3Sr, 239 (BRT)	John D. Spreckels Oceanic S.S. Co.; Spreckels Bros., San Francisco	Mission Bay San Francisco; Mission Creek, Channel Street, San Francisco	Anna - a schooner with a ten-day run from Honolulu to San Francisco in 1886, and eight round trips, San Francisco to Kahului in 357 days.	
William G. Irwin	1881 June 10; 1881 Jun	Half-brigantine, 348.16 tons, 135' LOD, 32.9' beam, 13' draft; SrBg, 348 (BRT)	John D. Spreckels Oceanic S.S. Co.; Spreckels Bros., San Francisco	Mission Bay San Francisco; Mission Creek, Channel Street, San Francisco	William G. Irwin - a sugar packet built in 1881 for J.D. Spreckels. Launched as a brigantine, later re-rigged as a three masted schooner. Fast passages from San Francisco to Kahului, Hawaiʻi, 8 days 17 hours, 1881, Honolulu to San Francisco, 9 days.	
Kodiak	1881 June 28; 1881 Jun	Schooner, 103 tons, 93' LOD, 25' beam, 8.2' draft; Sr, 103 (BRT)	Alaska Commercial Company; Alaska Comm. Co., San Francisco	Mission Bay San Francisco; Mission Creek, Channel Street, San Francisco		
City Of San Diego	1881 Aug	Sr, 49 (BRT)	F. Daily & Co., San Francisco	Mission Creek, Channel Street, San Francisco		
Tahiti	1881 Aug 18; 1881 Aug	Half-brigantine, 290 tons, 124' LOD, 32.3' beam, 12' draft; SrBg, 290 (BRT)	Turner & Rundle, San Francisco; Turner & Rundle, San Francisco	Mission Bay San Francisco; Mission Creek, Channel Street, San Francisco		
City of San Diego	1881 Aug 23	Schooner, 48.58 tons, 67.5' LOD, 20.5' beam, 6.5' draft	E. Daily & Co. San Francisco	Mission Bay San Francisco		
Poor Beggar	1881; 1881	Sloop, yacht, 25.5' LOD; ScYt	Matthew Turner's Shipyard Boat; USA	Mission Bay San Francisco; Mission Creek, Channel Street, San Francisco		
Emma Claudina	1882 Mar 28; 1882 Mar	Schooner, 3-masted, 195.65 tons, 113' LOD, 31.5' beam, 8.7' draft; 3Sr, 196 (BRT)	Spreckels Bros. Captain William Matson; Spreckels Bros., San Francisco	Mission Bay San Francisco; Mission Creek, Channel Street, San Francisco	Emma Claudina - 126 ft., 266 ton brigantine, the first ship of the Matson Line, named for the daughter of John D. Spreckels.	
J.C. Ford	1882 May 5; 1882 May	Schooner, 3-masted, 243.66 tons, 123' LOD, 31.8' beam, 10.3' draft; 3Sr, 244 (BRT)	J. C. Ford and Company; J.B. Ford & Co., San Francisco	Mission Bay San Francisco; Mission Creek, Channel Street, San Francisco		
Josephine	1882 May 14; 1882 May	Schooner, 64.22 tons, 77.5' LOD, 22' beam, 7.3' draft; Sr, 64 (BRT)	Hale & Company, San Francisco; Hale & Co., San Francisco	Mission Bay San Francisco; Mission Creek, Channel Street, San Francisco		
Garcia	1882 June 17; 1882 Jun	Schooner, 110.61 tons, 94' LOD, 24.5' beam, 7.5' draft; Sr, 116 (BRT)	S. B. Peterson San Francisco; Gerdau & Co., San Francisco	Mission Bay San Francisco; Mission Creek, Channel Street, San Francisco		
Canute	1882 July 14; 1882 Jul	Schooner, 118.89 tons, 92.5' LOD, 27.2' beam, 7.5' draft; Sr, 118 (BRT)	J. N. Pedlar, San Francisco; J.N. Pedler, San Francisco	Mission Bay San Francisco; Mission Creek, Channel Street, San Francisco		
Vigaronne	1882 July	Schooner, 140' LOD, 34' beam, 10' draft	B.C. Genereaux France	Mission Bay San Francisco		
Marion	1882 Aug 21; 1882 Aug	Schooner, 235.66 tons, 123' LOD, 31.8' beam, 10.3' draft; 3Sr, 235 (BRT)	Oliver Smith & Co. San Francisco; O. Smith & Co., San Francisco	Mission Bay San Francisco; Mission Creek, Channel Street, San Francisco		
Eva	1882 Aug 31; 1882	Schooner, 4.55 tons, 63.5 LOD, 20.4' beam; Sr	J. Kentfield & Company; Ausland	Mission Bay San Francisco; Mission Creek, Channel Street, San Francisco		
George H. Ross	1882 Aug 31; 1882	Schooner, 30.45 tons, 56' LOD, 18' beam, 5.7' draft; Sr, 30 (BRT)	George H. Ross; USA	Mission Bay San Francisco; Mission Creek, Channel Street, San Francisco		
Lurine or Lurline	1882 Oct 25; 1882 Oct	Schooner yacht, 47.25 tons, 75' LOD, 21.2' beam, 6.9' draft; SrYt, 50 (BRT)	J.D. Spreckels Matson Lines; Spreckels Bros., San Francisco	Mission Bay San Francisco; Mission Creek, Channel Street, San Francisco		
Cometa	1882 Nov 18; 1882	Schooner, 80.49 tons, 95' LOD, 23.1' beam, 7.3' draft; Sr, 84 (BRT)	Commodore Isadore Gutte; Ausland	Mission Bay San Francisco; Mission Creek, Channel Street, San Francisco		
Vesta	1882 Dec 5; 1882 Nov	Schooner, 3-masted, 272.59 tons, 127.8' LOD, 32' beam, 10' draft; 3SrCB, 285 (BRT)	B.C. Genereaux France; J. General & Co., San Francisco	Mission Bay San Francisco; Mission Creek, Channel Street, San Francisco		
Selina	1883 Jan 22; 1883 Feb	Half-brigantine, 331.99 tons, 135' LOD, 33' beam, 11.4' draft; SrBg, 349 (BRT)	Shipping Company of Portland; J.J. McKinnon, San Francisco	Mission Bay San Francisco; Mission Creek, Channel Street, San Francisco		
Theresa	1883 Feb; 1882	Schooner, scow, 70 tons; Sr, 70 (BRT)	Celia P. Lewis; Ausland	Mission Bay San Francisco; Mission Creek, Channel Street, San Francisco		
Papeete	1883 Mar 8; 1883 Mar	Schooner, 49.69 tons, 66.5' LOD, 20' beam, 6.5' draft; Sr, 67 (BRT)	Turner & Chapman Company Tahiti; Tahiti	Mission Bay San Francisco; Mission Creek, Channel Street, San Francisco	Papeete - schooner with a 17-day passage from San Francisco to Tahiti.	
Sea Witch	1883 Mar 10; 1883 May	Tug, steam, 74.12 tons, 77.9' LOD, 20' beam, 10' draft; SchlD, 74 (BRT)	Merchants Tugboat Company, San Francisco; Merchant's Tugboat Co., San Francisco	Mission Bay San Francisco; Mission Creek, Channel Street, San Francisco		
Tuamoto or Tuamotu	1883 Mar 11; 1883	Schooner, 40.45 tons, 66.6' LOD, 20' beam, 6.6' draft; Sr	Wilkens & CO. German Registry; Tahiti	Mission Bay San Francisco; Mission Creek, Channel Street, San Francisco		
Irma	1883 May	Sr, 92 (BRT)	George Boole, San Francisco	Mission Creek, Channel Street, San Francisco		
Norma	1883 May	Schooner, 3-masted, 326.3 tons, 138.5' LOD, 34.1' beam, 10.5' draft	Russ Lumber Company	Mission Bay San Francisco		
Ahome	1883 May 21; 1883 May	Schooner, 21.06 tons, 53' LOD, 15,3' beam, 5.1' draft; Sr, 20 (BRT)	Thanhauser & Company; Mexiko	Mission Bay San Francisco; Mission Creek, Channel Street, San Francisco		
Alert	1883 June 5; 1883 Apr	Tug, steam, 35.6 tons, 78' LOD, 19.5' beam, 9.8' draft; SchID, 71 (BRT)	John D. Spreckels; Spreckels Bros., San Francisco	Mission Bay San Francisco; Mission Creek, Channel Street, San Francisco		
Amethyst	1883 July 17; 1883 Jul	Schooner, 70.56 tons, 72.5' LOD, 26' beam, 5.7' draft; ScSr, 74 (BRT)	Captain Merrill, San Francisco; L. Wallace & Co., San Francisco	Benicia; Turner Shipyard, West 12th Street, Benecia		
Hawaii or Hawaiiland	1883 Sept 19; 1883 Oct	Schooner, 40 tons; Sr, (BRT)	Hawaii; Hawaii	Benicia; Turner Shipyard, West 12th Street, Benecia		
Nassau	1883 Oct 26; 1883 Sep	Schooner, 37.74 tons, 64' LOD, 18.5' beam, 6' draft; Sr, 36 (BRT)	Ellacott Company, San Francisco; Kpt. Ellacot, San Francisco	Benicia; Turner Shipyard, West 12th Street, Benecia		
Courtney Ford	1883 Nov 14; 1883 Dec	Half-brigantine, 480 tons, 146.3' LOD, 34.2' beam, 12.5' draft; SrBg, 401 (BRT)	J. J. McKinnon Lumber Company, San Francisco; J.J. McKinnon, San Francisco	Benicia; Turner Shipyard, West 12th Street, Benecia		
Islander	1883; 1885	Schooner, scow; D, (BRT)	Unknown; USA	Benicia; Turner Shipyard, West 12th Street, Benecia		
Monotambo or Mototambo	1883; 1883	Schooner; Sr	French Polynesia; Ausland	Benicia; Mission Creek, Channel Street, San Francisco		
Henrietta	1884 Feb 14; 1884 Feb	Schooner, 44.26 tons, 61.4' LOD, 20.1' beam, 6.5' draft; Sr, 47 (BRT)	Captain James Sennate & Co.; USA	Benicia; Turner Shipyard, West 12th Street, Benecia		
Karluk	1884 Mar 15; 1884 Mar	Half-brigantine, steam screw, 202.57 tons, 125.6' LOD, 27' beam, 14.2' draft; SrBgD, 294 (BRT)	Karluk Packing Company; Alaska Commercial Co., San Francisco	Benicia; Turner Shipyard, West 12th Street, Benecia	HMCS Karluk - Brigantine whaler that was acquired by the Canadian government as flagship to the Canadian Arctic Expedition.	
Jennie Griffin	1884 Mar 26; 1884	Schooner, 16.86 tons. 46.4' LOD, 16.3' beam, 4.4' draft; Sr, 17 (BRT)	R. G. Gibson San Francisco; Cpt. Boyle, San Francisco	Benicia; Turner Shipyard, West 12th Street, Benecia		
Unknown	1884 Apr 16	Schooner, 50 tons	Unknown	Benicia		
Cecilia	1884 Apr 18	Schooner, 3-masted, steam, 115.50 tons, 115' LOD, 29' beam, 8.6' draft	George H. Collins, San Francisco	Benicia		
Nellie	1884 Apr 27	Schooner, yacht, 32 tons	Peter J. Donahue San Francisco	Benicia		
Resolute	1884 May 5; 1884	Steamer, stern-wheel, 242.66 tons, 134' LOD, 29' beam, 5.5' draft; HRdD, 302 (BRT)	Spreckels Refinery San Francisco; USA	Benicia; Turner Shipyard, West 12th Street, Benecia		
Lizzie Merrill	1884 June 6; 1884	Schooner, 54.68 tons, 69' LOD, 23' beam, 5.9' draft; Sr, 54 (BRT)	Lewis Merrill & others; USA	Benicia; Turner Shipyard, West 12th Street, Benecia		
Celia	1884 June; 1884 Apr	Steamer, 215' LOD, 29.5' beam, 12' draft; 3SrCBD, 174 (BRT)	Higgins & Collins San Francisco; G.H. Collins, San Francisco	Benicia; Turner Shipyard, West 12th Street, Benecia		
Jennie & Edna	1884 June 19; 1884	Schooner, 63 tons, 70' LOD, 24' beam, 5.5' draft; Sr, 64 (BRT)	Mr. Norden; USA	Benicia; Turner Shipyard, West 12th Street, Benecia		
Porfirio Díaz	1884 July 23; 1884	Schooner, steam screw, 27.74 tons; Sr, (BRT)	Juan Hidalgo Mexico; Mexiko	Benicia; Turner Shipyard, West 12th Street, Benecia		
Garnet	1884 Sept 25	Steamer, 30' LOD, 7' beam, 5' draft	Commodore John L. Eckley	Benicia		
Unknown	1885 Jan	Schooner, 60' LOD	French Registry Tahiti	Benicia		
Alert	1885 Jan 20; 1885	Tug, steam, 37.68 tons, 86' LOD, 20' beam, 9.5' draft; SchlD, 75 (BRT)	John D. Spreckels; John D. Spreckels, San Francisco	Benicia; Turner Shipyard, West 12th Street, Benecia		
James A. Hamilton	1885 Jan 20; 1885	Schooner, 73.91 tons, 81.5' LOD, 24' beam, 7.5' draft; Sr, 77 (BRT)	Magee, Moore & Company San Francisco; Magee & More, San Francisco	Benicia; Turner Shipyard, West 12th Street, Benecia		
Peru	1885 Feb 14	Steamer, 42' LOD, 10' beam, 5' draft	Peruvian Registry	Benicia		
Azteca	1885 Feb 19; 1885	Schooner, 45 tons, 72' LOD, 20' beam, 6' draft; Sr, (BRT)	Mexican owners, Mazatlan; Mexiko	Benicia; Turner Shipyard, West 12th Street, Benecia		
Ondina	1885 Mar 29	Sloop, 31.90 tons, 70' LOD, 18' beam, 5.25' draft	Altata, Mexico	Benicia		
Emma	1885 Apr 17; 1885	Schooner, 42.91 tons, 68.8' LOD, 20' beam, 6.5' draft; Sr, 44 (BRT)	Mexican owners; USA	Benicia; Turner Shipyard, West 12th Street, Benecia		
J.I. Dowsett or James I. Dawsett	1885 Apr 29; 1885	Schooner, steam screw, 100 tons, 98' LOD, 20' beam, 8' draft; D, (BRT)	F. Wandenberger, Inter-Island Steam Navigation Co.; Hawaii	Benicia; Turner Shipyard, West 12th Street, Benecia		
Solano	1885 May 23; 1901 Mar 1; 1885 1901 Mar	Schooner, scow, 63.24 tons, 54' LOD, 22' beam, 5.5' draft, price $7,000; Schooner, 4-masted, 728 tons, 175' LOD, 40' beam, 14.5' draft; ScSr, 67 (BRT) 4sr, 728 (BRT)	Piper, Aden, & Goodall Company, San Francisco; Alaska Salmon Packing Company; San Francisco	Benicia; Turner Shipyard, West 12th Street, Benecia	Solano - fast passage from Shanghai to Port Townsend, Washington of 24 days in April 1902.[5] Wrecked on North Beach (the ocean side of Long Beach Peninsula), February 5, 1907.	
Navigator	1885 June 6; 1885	Schooner, 42.49 tons, 61' LOD, 18.5' beam, 6.3' draft, Price $10,000; Sr, 44 (BRT)	Wightman Brothers; USA	Benicia; Turner Shipyard, West 12th Street, Benecia		
Gracie B. Richardson	1885 June 8; 1885 May	Schooner, 59.45 tons, 70' LOD, 23.5' beam, 6.3' draft; Sr, 62 (BRT)	Capt. Sandberg, San Francisco; Cpt. Sandberg, San Francisco	Benicia; Turner Shipyard, West 12th Street, Benecia		
John Rodgers or John Rogers	1885 June 22; 1886	Steamer, 60' LOD, 18' beam, 5' draft; D, (BRT)	US Army Benicia Arsenal; Ausland	Benicia; Turner Shipyard, West 12th Street, Benecia		
Domatilla	1885 Aug 29; 1886	Schooner; Sr, (BRT)	Hawaiian registry; Ausland	Benicia; Turner Shipyard, West 12th Street, Benecia		
M. Romero Rubio	1885 Nov 28; 1885	Schooner, steam-aux, 60 tons; D	International Company of Mexico; Ausland	Benicia; Turner Shipyard, West 12th Street, Benecia		
Audina	1885	Slp, 33 (BRT)	USA	Turner Shipyard, West 12th Street, Benecia		
Lizzie Merrill	1885	Sr, 62 (BRT)	USA	Turner Shipyard, West 12th Street, Benecia		
San Jose	1886 Mar 11; 1886	Schooner, 51.88 tons, 67.5' LOD, 20' beam, 7' draft; Sr, 55 (BRT)	James Girvan, San Francisco; San Francisco	Benicia; Turner Shipyard, West 12th Street, Benecia		
Reliance	1886 Apr 1; 1886	Schooner, 61.34 tons. 69.5' LOD, 23' beam, 6.5' draft; Sr, 65 (BRT)	Henry Steffens San Francisco; San Francisco	Benicia; Turner Shipyard, West 12th Street, Benecia		
Frank Lawrence	1886 Apr 9; 1886	Schooner, scow, 55.76 tons, 63' LOD, 24' beam, 4.5' draft; ScSr, 55 (BRT)	Frank Lawrence, San Francisco; F. Lawrence, San Francisco	Benicia; Turner Shipyard, West 12th Street, Benecia		
Pearl	1886 Apr 9; 1886 Apr	Schooner, 83.56 tons, 95.5' LOD, 23' beam, 7.5' draft; Sr, 88 (BRT)	Louis Sloss, San Francisco; Louis Sloss, San Francisco	Benicia; Turner Shipyard, West 12th Street, Benecia		
Moe Wahine	1886 May 21; 1886	Schooner, 60 tons, 85' LOD, 24' beam, 9' draft; Sr, 147 (BRT)	Hawaiian Registry; Hawaii	Benicia; Turner Shipyard, West 12th Street, Benecia		
Mateata or Meteata	1886 July 19; 1886	Schooner, 50.73 tons, 67.1' LOD, 20.4' beam, 7' draft; Sr, 53 (BRT)	A. Crawford San Francisco; Ausland	Benicia; Turner Shipyard, West 12th Street, Benecia		
Apia	1886 Aug 10	Schooner, 53.4 tons. 67.1' LOD, 20.4' beam, 7' draft	Wightman Brothers	Benicia		
Lovina	1886 Dec 7	Schooner, 67.67 tons, 73.5' LOD, 22.5' beam, 8' draft	Matthew Turner & Company Tahiti	Benicia		
Lavina	1886	Sr, 71 (BRT)	Ausland	Turner Shipyard, West 12th Street, Benecia		
Berwick	1887 Jan 20; 1887 Feb	Schooner, 95.67 tons, 82.6' LOD, 27.4 beam, 7.1' draft, price $7,700; Sr, 100 (BRT)	R. D. Hume Del Norte Commercial Co.; Del Norte Commercial Co., San Francisco	Benicia; Turner Shipyard, West 12th Street, Benecia		
Del Norte	1887 Feb 2; 1887	Schooner, 95.64 tons. 82.6' LOD, 27.4' beam, 7.1' draft, price $7,700; Sr, 101 (BRT)	R. D. Hume Del Norte Commercial Co.; Del Norte Commercial Co., San Francisco	Benicia; Turner Shipyard, West 12th Street, Benecia		
Chetco	1887 Mar 8; 1887 Mar	Schooner, 98.69 tons, 83.6' LOD, 27.4' beam, 7.2' draft, price $8,000; Sr, 104 (BRT)	R. D. Hume Del Norte Commercial Co.; Del Norte Commercial Co., San Francisco	Benicia; Turner Shipyard, West 12th Street, Benecia		
Nellie	1887 April	Schooner, yacht, 88' LOD, 21' beam, 10.3' draft	J. Mervyn Donahue San Francisco	Benicia		
Thistle	1887 Apr 20; 1887	Whaleback steam tug, 32.38 tons, 72' LOD, 18' beam, 10' draft, price $11,800; SrD, 65 (BRT)	R. D. Hume; USA	Benicia; Turner Shipyard, West 12th Street, Benecia		
Antelope	1887 May 27; 1887 May	Schooner, 123,98 tons, 89.5' LOD, 28.8' beam, 7' draft; Sr, 124 (BRT)	G. W. Hume, San Francisco; A.M. Hame, San Francisco	Benicia; Turner Shipyard, West 12th Street, Benecia		
Lurline	1887 June 2; 1887 May	Half-brigantine, 350 tons, 135' LOD, 34.4' beam, 13' draft, price $26,000; SrBg, 359 (BRT)	J.D Spreckels Oceanic S.S. Co.; Spreckels Bros., San Francisco	Benicia; Turner Shipyard, West 12th Street, Benecia	Lurline - a 135-foot brigantine made for Claus Spreckels in 1887, who sold immediately 75% to William Matson as an expansion of Matson Lines. They resold the vessel in 1896. The brig was lost in 1915.	
Eureka	1887 June 27; 1887	Schooner, 117.77 tons, 89.5' LOD, 28.5' beam, 7' draft, price $9,000; Sr, 124 (BRT)	L. A Maison, San Francisco; L.A. Maison, San Francisco	Benicia; Turner Shipyard, West 12th Street, Benecia		
Elsie Iversen or Elsei Iverson	1887 Aug 6; 1887 Jul	Schooner, 116.23 tons, 93.5' LOD, 27.2' beam, 7.5' draft, price $10,500; Sr, 122 (BRT)	Nils Iverson; N. Iversen, San Francisco	Benicia; Turner Shipyard, West 12th Street, Benecia		
Newark	1887 Sept 1; 1887 Aug	Schooner, 114.53 tons, 93.5' LOD, 27.2' beam, 7.2' draft, price $11,000; Sr, 121 (BRT)	C.L. Dingley; C.L. Dingley, San Francisco	Benicia; Turner Shipyard, West 12th Street, Benecia		
Monterey	1887 Oct 6; 1887 Sep	Schooner, 119.84 tons, 96.5' LOD, 28' beam, 7.5' draft, price $11,000; SrCB, 126 (BRT)	C.L. Dingley; C.L. Dingley, San Francisco	Benicia; Turner Shipyard, West 12th Street, Benecia		
Confianca or Conflanza	1888 Jan 14; 1888	Schooner, 84.23 tons, 78' LOD, 25.5' beam, 7' draft; Sr, 88 (BRT)	Henry Topfer; USA	Benicia; Turner Shipyard, West 12th Street, Benecia		
Frijto or Fruto	1888 Jan; 1898	Steamer, stern-wheel, 429 tons, 235' LOD, 45' beam, 5.6' draft; HRdD, 429 (BRT)	Freeman, Smith & Company Russian Registry; Ausland?	Benicia; Turner Shipyard, West 12th Street, Benecia		
Seven Sisters	1888 Mar 3; 1888	Schooner, 122.81 tons, 97' LOD, 27.2' beam, 7.5' draft, price $12,000; Sr, 129 (BRT)	Shattuck & Co.; J. Johnson, San Francisco	Benicia; Turner Shipyard, West 12th Street, Benecia		
Bertha	1888 Apr 12; 1888 Apr	Half-brigantine steam-aux, 449 tons, 140' LOD, 32' beam, 15' draft, price $32,000; SrBgD, 597 (BRT)	Karluk Packing Company; Karluk Packing Co., San Francisco	Benicia; Turner Shipyard, West 12th Street, Benecia		
Equator	1888 May 31; 1888	Schooner, 72.68 tons, 66.5' LOD, 22' beam, 8' draft; Sr, 76 (BRT)	K. C. Eldridge, Pacific Packing & Navigation Co. San Francisco; Kpt. R. Reid, San Francisco	Benicia; Turner Shipyard, West 12th Street, Benecia	Equator - In 1889, the Equator was chartered by Robert Louis Stevenson, who sailed her with his wife Fanny Van de Grift Stevenson from Honolulu to the Gilbert Islands. The voyage was the basis for Stevenson's travelogue In the South Seas.	
Portia	1888 June 19; 1888 Jul	Schooner, 62.88 tons, 75' LOD, 23' beam, 6' draft; Sr, 63 (BRT)	Higgins & Collins Lumber Company, San Francisco; Higgins & Collins, San Francisco	Benicia; Turner Shipyard, West 12th Street, Benecia		
America	1888 July 21; 1888 Sep	Schooner, pilot, 74.74 tons, 81' LOD, 24' beam, 9.7' draft, price $20,000; LoSr, 81 (BRT)	San Francisco Bar Pilots; San Francisco Bar Pilots	Benicia; Turner Shipyard, West 12th Street, Benecia		
Alice	1888; 1888	Steamer, stern-wheel; HRdD	Pacific Packing & Navigation Co. Sitka, Alaska; USA	Benicia; Turner Shipyard, West 12th Street, Benecia		
Catalina	1888	SlpYt	USA	Turner Shipyard, West 12th Street, Benecia		
Cudina	1888	Schooner	Unknown	Benicia		
Linda	1889 Jan; 1888	Sloop, yacht, 9 tons, 36.9 LOD, 14' beam, 5.5' draft; SlpYt	Judge Prescott Sawyer; USA	Benicia; Turner Shipyard, West 12th Street, Benecia		
Unknown	1889 Jan; 1889	Tug, steam, sub-assembled and shipped to Alaska; HRdD	Alaska Commercial Company; USA	Benicia; Turner Shipyard, West 12th Street, Benecia		
Helena or Helene	1889 Jan 25; 1889	Schooner, yacht, 40' LOD, 18' beam, 5' draft; Sr	Col. Fred Whitney Hawaii; Ausland	Benicia; Turner Shipyard, West 12th Street, Benecia		
Aleut	1889 Mar 7; 1889	Schooner, steam-screw, 19.17 tons, 59.5' LOD, 19' beam, 7' draft; Sr, 38 (BRT)	Alaska Commercial Company; USA	Benicia; Turner Shipyard, West 12th Street, Benecia		
Jennie	1889 Mar 7; 1888	Schooner, steam-screw, 50.75 tons, 72.9' LOD, 22' beam, 7' draft; Sr, 70 (BRT)	Alaska Commercial Company; USA	Benicia; Turner Shipyard, West 12th Street, Benecia		
Lydia	1889 Apr 1; 1889	Schooner, 39 tons, 62' LOD, 20' Beam, 7' draft; Sr, 40 (BRT)	Karluk Packing Company; USA	Benicia; Turner Shipyard, West 12th Street, Benecia		
Pinole	1889 Apr 27; 1889	Schooner, 77.56 tons, 72' LOD, 25.4' beam, 6.5' draft; Sr, 82 (BRT)	Sacramento Farm Hay Vessel; San Francisco	Benicia; Turner Shipyard, West 12th Street, Benecia		
Arthur I.	1889 May 17; 1889 Jun	Schooner, 129.26 tons, 97' LOD, 27.3' beam, 7.7' draft, price $12,000; SrCB, 129 (BRT)	Nils Iverson, Iverson & Co. Benicia; N. Iversen, San Francisco	Benicia; Turner Shipyard, West 12th Street, Benecia		
Volcano	1889 May	Sloop, yacht, 13.38 tons, 27' LOD	German Registration	Benicia		
Molly Woggin	1889 June	Sloop, yacht, 27' LOD	Matthew Turner	Benicia		
Arctic	1889 Aug 4; 1889	Steamer, stern-wheel, 42.07 tons, 60.6' LOD, 19' beam, 7' draft, Sub-assembled and shipped to Alaska; HRdD	Alaska Commercial Company; USA	Benicia; Turner Shipyard, West 12th Street, Benecia		
Reliance	1889 Sept 24; 1889	Schooner, steam-screw, 94.21 tons, 92.9' LOD, 21.2' beam, 10.5' draft; DSchl, 94 (BRT)	John D. Spreckels, San Francisco; John D. Spreckels, San Francisco	Benicia; Turner Shipyard, West 12th Street, Benecia		
Eva	1889	Schooner, 36.87 tons, 64' LOD, 22.3' beam, 3.3' draft	Unknown	Benicia		
Olga	1890 Jan 13; 1890	Schooner, 46.12 tons, 63.5' LOD, 20' beam, 7' draft; Sr, 46 (BRT)	Captain Boden; USA	Benicia; Turner Shipyard, West 12th Street, Benecia		
Herman	1890 Feb 14; 1890	Schooner, 105.75 tons, 87.5' LOD, 24.5' beam, 10' draft; Sr, 106 (BRT)	George Liebes Fur Company; Geo Liebes, San Francisco	Benicia; Turner Shipyard, West 12th Street, Benecia		
St. Paul	1890 Mar 28; 1890	Schooner, 46.14 tons, 63.5' LOD, 20' beam, 4' draft; Sr, 49 (BRT)	M. L. Washburne Kodiak, Alaska; USA	Benicia; Turner Shipyard, West 12th Street, Benecia		
Pacific	1890 Apr 14; 1890	Schooner. steam-screw, 31.66 tons, 75' LOD, 20.6' beam, 8.2' draft; D, 63 (BRT)	Leon Sloss Pacific Packing Co.; USA	Benicia; Turner Shipyard, West 12th Street, Benecia		
Archie & Fontie	1890 May 20; 1890	Schooner, 61.28 tons, 76.5' LOD, 25.5' beam, 6.3' draft; Sr, 64 (BRT)	Captain H. A. Richardson; USA	Benicia; Turner Shipyard, West 12th Street, Benecia		
Mikronesia	1890 June 4; 1890 Jun	Schooner, 35 tons, 60' LOD, 16' beam, 6' draft; Sr, 35 (BRT)	A.G. Jaluit-Gesellschaft, Hamburg; A.G. Jaluit-Ges., Hamburg	Benicia; Turner Shipyard, West 12th Street, Benecia		
Emma	1890 June 16; 1890	Schooner, 25.33 tons, 51.5' LOD, 16.8' beam, 6' draft; Sr, 25 (BRT)	Captain Brown Benson Margovia, Alaska; Cpt. B. Benson, San Francisco	Benicia; Turner Shipyard, West 12th Street, Benecia		
Jessie	1890 June; 1890	Schooner, yacht, 76 tons, 76' LOD, 24.5' beam, 8.7' draft; SrYt, 73 (BRT)	Commodore Joseph MacDonough San Francisco; San Francisco	Benicia; Turner Shipyard, West 12th Street, Benecia		
Pitcairn	1890 July 28; 1890 Oct	Schooner, yacht, 121.52 tons, 93.5' LOD, 27.2' beam, 10' draft, price $18,683; Sr, 121 (BRT)	O. Oleen. San Francisco, Seventh-day Adventists; O. Olesen, San Francisco	Benicia; Turner Shipyard, West 12th Street, Benecia		
Ramona	1890 Aug 1; 1890	Schooner, yacht, 31.50 tons, 58.5' LOD, 19.6' beam, 6.5' draft; SrYt, 34 (BRT)	J. H. McCarthy, San Francisco; San Francisco	Benicia; Turner Shipyard, West 12th Street, Benecia		
Glad Tidings	1890 Aug 15	Steamer, price $35,000	Second Adventist Church	Benicia		
Robert W. Logan	1890 Aug 29; 1890	Schooner, 28.62 tons, 53' LOD, 17.5' beam, 7' draft; Sr, 30 (BRT)	American Board of Foreign Missions of Boston; USA	Benicia; Turner Shipyard, West 12th Street, Benecia		
Alister or Alster	1890 Aug 30; 1890 Sep	Schooner, 80 tons, 80' LOD, 23 1/2' beam, 8' draft; Sr, 80 (BRT)	A.G. Jaluit-Gesellschaft, Hamburg; A.G. Jaluit-Ges., Hamburg	Benicia; Turner Shipyard, West 12th Street, Benecia		
Northern	1890; 1890	Schooner, steam screw; D	Unknown; USA	Benicia; Turner Shipyard, West 12th Street, Benecia		
Galilee	1891 Feb 8; 1891 Feb	Half-brigantine, 354.07 tons, 132.5" LOD, 33.5' beam, 12.7' draft; SrBg, 354 (BRT)	Matthew Turner; eigene Rechnung	Benicia; Turner Shipyard, West 12th Street, Benecia	Galilee - Brigantine that holds the record for the Tahiti-San Francisco run in a wooden-hulled sailing vessel (22 days), converted to magnetic observatory when under charter to the Carnegie Institution of Washington Department of Terrestrial Magnetism for three years.	
Royal	1891 Mar 7	Schooner, steam-aux, 29.54 tons, 75' LOD, 20.6' beam, 8.2' draft	Royal Packing Company	Benicia		
Benicia	1891 Apr 22; 1891	Schooner, scow, 30.88 tons, 49.6' LOD, 20.2' beam, 4' draft; ScSr, 32 (BRT)	Albert Eriksen San Francisco; USA	Benicia; Turner Shipyard, West 12th Street, Benecia		
La Tahitienne	1891 June 20	Schooner, 82.33 tons, 106' LOD, 21.9' beam, 7' draft	Mr. Emile Levy French Registry	Benicia		
Teavaroa	1891 July 25; 1892	Schooner, 110 tons, 89' LOD, 28' beam, 8' draft; Sr, 110 (BRT)	Tahiti owners; Tahiti	Benicia; Turner Shipyard, West 12th Street, Benecia		
Henry	1891 July 29; 1891 Jul	Schooner, 50 tons, 81' LOD, 21.9' beam, 7' draft, $7,920; Sr, 50 (BRT)	Société Comm. de l'Océanie, Hamburg; Soc. comm. de l'Océanie, Hamburg	Benicia; Turner Shipyard, West 12th Street, Benecia		
Chunaka or Churruca	1891 Oct; 1892	Schooner, 50 tons; Sr, 50 (BRT)	Mexican owners; Tahiti	Benicia; Turner Shipyard, West 12th Street, Benecia		
Tahitienne	1891	Sr, 50 (BRT)	Levy, Tahiti	Turner Shipyard, West 12th Street, Benecia		
Truant	1891	Sloop, yacht, 30' LOD	Corinthian Yacht Club	Benicia		
Papeete	1892 Feb 12; 1892	Schooner, 127 tons, 112' LOD, 33.4' beam, 11.8' draft; Sr, 127 (BRT)	French Government Gunboat; Tahiti	Benicia; Turner Shipyard, West 12th Street, Benecia		
Hunter	1892 Mar 11; 1890	Schooner, 63.32 tons, 75' LOD, 26.6' beam, 7' draft; Sr, 63 (BRT)	Rudolph Neumann Ounalaska, Alasaka; USA	Benicia; Turner Shipyard, West 12th Street, Benecia		
Rachel	1892 Apr 11; 1892	Schooner, 84.47 tons, 79.5' LOD, 25.7' beam, 6.7' draft, price $8,000; Sr, 84 (BRT)	Naval Reserve Company D; USA	Benicia; Turner Shipyard, West 12th Street, Benecia		
Everett Hayes or Everett Hays	1892 Apr 20; 1892	Schooner, 37.07 tons, 60' LOD, 19.2 beam, 6' draft; Sr, 39 (BRT)	Samuel Applegate Ounalaska, Alaska; USA	Benicia; Turner Shipyard, West 12th Street, Benecia		
Hiawatha	1892 Apr 20; 1892	Steamer, 9.78 tons, 125 HP, 49' LOD, 13' beam, 6' draft; DSchl, 19 (BRT)	Commodore John Eckley, Eckley Station, Contra Costa County; USA	Benicia; Turner Shipyard, West 12th Street, Benecia		
Shasta	1892 June 6; 1892	Schooner, scow, 91.17 tons, 82' LOD, 26' beam, 6.1' draft; ScSr, 95 (BRT)	Piper, Aden & Company; USA	Benicia; Turner Shipyard, West 12th Street, Benecia		
Alpine	1892 June 23; 1892	Schooner, scow, 91.17 tons, 82' LOD, 26' beam, 6.1' draft; ScSr, 95 (BRT)	Piper, Aden & Company; USA	Benicia; Turner Shipyard, West 12th Street, Benecia		
Joseph & Henry	1892 Aug 1; 1892	Schooner, 90.01 tons, 84' LOD, 27' beam, 6.6' draft; Sr, 95 (BRT)	Joseph Harder & Henry Stefffens San Francisco; USA	Benicia; Turner Shipyard, West 12th Street, Benecia		
Geneva	1892 Dec 9; 1892 Dec	Half-brigantine, 495.66 tons, 150' LOD, 36.3' beam, 14' draft; SrBg, 496 (BRT)	Nelson Andrews Matthew Turner & Company; eigene Rechnung	Benicia; Turner Shipyard, West 12th Street, Benecia	Geneva - a brigantine with a passage of 2 days between Launceston, Tasmania and Newcastle, New South Wales.	
Jeanette	1893 Feb 18; 1893	Half-brigantine, steam-aux, 217.81 tons, 116' LOD, 27.2' beam, 13.2' draft; SrBgD, 298 (BRT)	Roth, Blum & Co. San Francisco; L. Blum & Co., San Francisco	Benicia; Turner Shipyard, West 12th Street, Benecia		
Santa Cruz	1893 May 5; 1893	Schooner, 43.40 tons, 64' LOD, 18.8' beam, 6.4' draft; Sr, 45 (BRT)	Santa Cruz Island Co.; USA	Benicia; Turner Shipyard, West 12th Street, Benecia		
Tulenkun	1893 June 1; 1893	Schooner, 47.07 tons, 61' LOD, 19.5' beam, 6.5' draft; Sr, 47 (BRT)	A.G. Jaluit-Gesellschaft, Hamburg; USA	Benicia; Turner Shipyard, West 12th Street, Benecia		
Naiad	1893 July 15	Yawl, yacht	Fred Kelley	Benicia		
Tolna	1893 July 19; 1893	Schooner, yacht, 78.61 tons, 88' LOD, 24.5' beam, 10' draft; SrYt, 82 (BRT)	Count Festetics von Tolna; Count Festeties, San Francisco	Benicia; Turner Shipyard, West 12th Street, Benecia	Tolna - two-masted, 88 foot long, 78 61/100 ton schooner built in 1893 for Eila Haggin Festetics de Tolna. Wrecked off the coast of Minicoy, Maldives in February 1900.	
Benak or Benick	1894 Aug 21; 1894	Schooner, 53 tons; Sr, 53 (BRT)	A.G. Jaluit-Gesellschaft, Hamburg; A.G. Jaluit-Ges., Hamberg	Benicia; Turner Shipyard, West 12th Street, Benecia		
Anita	1894 Dec 27; 1894	Schooner, 83.71 tons, 82' LOD, 24.3' beam, 6.2' draft; Sr, 88 (BRT)	W. F. Boole & Co. Ybarra Mining Co.; Ybara Mining Co., San Domingo	Benicia; Turner Shipyard, West 12th Street, Benecia		
Etta B.	1895 Mar 27; 1895	Schooner, gas screw, 27.83 tons, 51' LOD, 18' beam, 4.9' draft; SrAux, 25 (BRT)	C. Matsen Bolinas, California; USA	Benicia; Turner Shipyard, West 12th Street, Benecia		
Ida A.	1895 Apr 3; 1894	Schooner, 26.6 tons, 53' LOD, 16.4' beam, 5.4' draft; SrAux, 28 (BRT)	Thomas Marshall San Francisco; USA	Benicia; Turner Shipyard, West 12th Street, Benecia		
Alice	1895 May 23; 1895 Oct	Steamer, stern-wheel, 400 tons, 160' LOD, 30' beam, 9' draft, Sub-assembled and shipped to Alaska; HRdD	Pacific Packing & Navigation Co. Sitka, Alaska; St. Michaels, Jukon River, Alaska	Benicia; Turner Shipyard, West 12th Street, Benecia		
Beaver	1895 May 24; 1895 May	Steamer, stern-wheel, 37 tons, 59' LOD, 15' beam, 3.1' draft, Sub-assembled and shipped to Alaska; HRdD, 37 (BRT)	Pacific Packing & Navigation Co. Sitka, Alaska; St. Michaels, Jukon River, Alaska	Benicia; Turner Shipyard, West 12th Street, Benecia		
Four Sisters	1895 June 8; 1895 Jun	Schooner, gas-screw, 31.54 tons, 58.5' LOD, 20.6' beam, 4.5' draft; SrAux, 38 (BRT)	J. P. Hauto Sonoma State; Cpt.J.P. Hauto, San Francisco	Benicia; Turner Shipyard, West 12th Street, Benecia		
Kodiak	1895 Aug 6; 1895	Schooner, 125.28 tons, 105' LOD, 25.3' beam, 9.3' draft; Sr, 146 (BRT)	Alaska Commercial Company; Alaska Commercial Co., San Francisco	Benicia; Turner Shipyard, West 12th Street, Benecia		
Gertrude	1895 Dec 13	Sloop, 6.65 tons, 25.5' LOD, 11.7' beam, 2.9' draft	Unknown	Benicia		
Gerald C.	1895 Dec 29; 1896	Schooner, gas-screw, 75 tons, 68' LOD, 18' beam, 5.2' draft, price $6,000; Sr, 31 (BRT)	Frank Cooley Ravenswood, CA; USA	Benicia; Turner Shipyard, West 12th Street, Benecia		
Five Brothers	1896 Mar 11; 1896	Schooner, steam-aux, 70.44 tons, 79' LOD, 25.7' beam, 6.4' draft; Sr, 81 (BRT)	Johnsen & Emigh, San Francisco; Johnsen & Emigh, San Francisco	Benicia; Turner Shipyard, West 12th Street, Benecia		
Baranoff	1896 Mar 13; 1896	Schooner, steam-aux, 57.24 tons, 74.5' LOD, 22.7' beam, 7.6' draft; Sr, 64 (BRT)	Alaska Commercial Company; Alaska Commercial Co., San Francisco	Benicia; Turner Shipyard, West 12th Street, Benecia		
Maksoutoff	1896 Mar 13; 1896	Schooner, 57.24 tons, 74.5' LOD, 22.7' beam, 7.6' draft; Sr, 64 (BRT)	Alaska Commercial Company; Alaska Commercial Co., San Francisco	Benicia; Turner Shipyard, West 12th Street, Benecia		
Duxbury	1896 Aug 3; 1896	Schooner, gas auxiliary, 30.95 tons, 61.5 LOD, 19' beam, 5.1' draft; SrAux, 37 (BRT)	George L. Gibson Bolinas, California; USA	Benicia; Turner Shipyard, West 12th Street, Benecia		
Mercur	1896 Oct; 1896 Oct	Schooner, 52 tons, 70' LOD, 20' beam, 7' draft; Sr, 51 (BRT)	A.G. Jaluit-Gesellschaft, Hamburg; A.G. Jaluit-Ges., Hamburg	Benicia; Turner Shipyard, West 12th Street, Benecia		
James Spier	1896 Nov 24	Schooner, steam-aux, 195' LOD, 34" beam, 15' draft	Inter-island Navigation Co. Hawaii	Benicia		
Bella	1896; 1896	Steamer, stern-wheel, 400 HP, 370 tons, 140' LOD, 33' beam, 8' draft, Sub-assembled and shipped to Alaska; HRdD, 370 (BRT)	Northern Commercial Co. St Michaels, Alaska; St. Michaels, Jukon River, Alaska	Benicia; Turner Shipyard, West 12th Street, Benecia		
Rover	1896	Schooner, yacht, 76 tons. 76' LOD, 22.7' beam, 9.6' draft	R. Barrett Fithian	Benicia		
Pride of the Bay	1897 Mar 14	Sloop yacht, 40' LOD	Matthew Turner	Benicia		
Villain	1897 Mar 25	Schooner, yacht	Matthew Turner	Benicia		
La Chilena	1897 May 24; 1897	Schooner, naphtha-aux, 10.70 tons, 41' LOD, 14' beam, 4.8' draft; SrAux, 14 (BRT)	Campbell Company; Ross & Hewlett & G.W. Call, San Francisco	Benicia; Turner Shipyard, West 12th Street, Benecia		
Leah	1897 Sept; 1898	Steamer, stern-wheel, 477 tons, 138.7' LOD, 31' beam, 6.3' draft, price $80,000; HRdD, 477 (BRT)	Northern Commercial Co. St Michaels, Alaska; Northern Commercial Co., St. Michaels, Alaska	Benicia; Turner Shipyard, West 12th Street, Benecia		
Neptun or Neptune	1897 Dec; 1897 Jun	Schooner, 140 tons, 104' LOD, 24' beam, 7.1' draft; Sr, 140 (BRT)	A.G. Jaluit-Gesellschaft, Hamburg; A.G. Jaluit-Ges., Hamburg	Benicia; Turner Shipyard, West 12th Street, Benecia		
Hercules	1898 Jan; 1898 Jan	Schooner, steam-screw, 150 tons, 106' LOD, 25' beam, 10' draft; SrAux, 150 (BRT)	A.G. Jaluit-Gesellschaft, Hamburg; A.G. Jaluit-Ges., Hamburg	Benicia; Turner Shipyard, West 12th Street, Benecia		
Alice Rix	1898 March; 1898	Steamer, stern-wheel, 100' LOD; HRdD	Union Shipping and Transportation Co.; Ausland?	Benicia; Turner Shipyard, West 12th Street, Benecia		
Bessie H.	1898 March; 1898	Steamer, stern-wheel, 175' LOD, Sub-assembled and shipped to Alaska; HRdD	Pacific Coast Commercial Co.; Ausland?	Benicia; Turner Shipyard, West 12th Street, Benecia		
Mary Sachs	1898 Apr 22; 1898	Schooner, twin screw, two 30 HP engines, 35.31 tons, 56.5' LOD, 18.2' beam, 5.6' draft, price $5,000; Sr, 35 (BRT)	Lippman Sachs, Sachs Brothers and Company; USA	Benicia; Turner Shipyard, West 12th Street, Benecia		
Clara	1898 June 11; 1898	Steamer, stern-wheel, 81.52 tons, 75.5' LOD, 22' beam, 4.6' draft; Sr, 81 (BRT)	California & Northwest Trading & Mining Company; Ausland	Benicia; Turner Shipyard, West 12th Street, Benecia		
W.P. Fuller	1898 June 30; 1898	Schooner, twin screw gas, 49.07 tons, 76,5' LOD, 18.5' beam, 5.3' draft; Sr2Aux, 49 (BRT)	W. P. Fuller & Company; USA	Benicia; Turner Shipyard, West 12th Street, Benecia		
Malolo	1898 July; 1898	Schooner, gas-screw, 29 tons, 60.8' LOD, 15.2' beam, 5.8' draft, price $7,000; Sr	John Sass Hawaiian Registry; Ausland	Benicia; Turner Shipyard, West 12th Street, Benecia		
Queen of the Isles	1898 July; 1898 Aug	Schooner, kerosene-aux, 50 HP, 95' LOD, 24' beam, 9' draft; Sr, 138 (BRT)	Wilkins & Company; Wilkens & Co., Jaluit	Benicia; Turner Shipyard, West 12th Street, Benecia		
San Jose	1898 Aug 19	Steamer, stern-wheel, 192.45 tons, 101' LOD, 28' beam, 5.8' draft	Robert Christie	Benicia		
Mascotte	1898 Nov 18; 1898	Schooner, 95" LOD, 34' beam, 9' draft; SrAux, 130 (BRT)	Hernsheim & Co. of Hamburg; Hernsheim & Co., (Hamburg), Matupi	Benicia; Turner Shipyard, West 12th Street, Benecia		
Bear	1898; 1898	Schooner-rigged lighter, 539 tons; SrL, 539 (BRT)	Northern Commercial Co. St Michaels, Alaska; St. Michaels, Jukon River, Alaska	Benicia; Turner Shipyard, West 12th Street, Benecia		
Fox	1898; 1898	Schooner-rigged lighter, 539 tons; SrL, 539 (BRT)	Northern Commercial Co. St Michaels, Alaska; St. Michaels, Jukon River, Alaska	Benicia; Turner Shipyard, West 12th Street, Benecia		
Monarch	1898; 1898	Barge, lighter, 153 tons; L, 153 (BRT)	Dawson City, Yukon; USA	Benicia; Turner Shipyard, West 12th Street, Benecia		
Taku	1898	Steamer, 54 tons	Unknown	Benicia		
Alba	1899 Jan; 1899	Schooner, 63' LOD, 18' beam, 6' draft; Sr	Mexican owners; USA	Benicia; Turner Shipyard, West 12th Street, Benecia		
Ebon	1899 Jan; 1899 Dec	Schooner, 63' LOD, 18' beam, 6' draft; Sr, 30 (BRT)	A.G. Jaluit-Gesellschaft, Hamburg; A.G. Jaluit-Ges., Hamburg	Benicia; Turner Shipyard, West 12th Street, Benecia		
Marshalleon	1899 Jan; 1899 Jan	Schooner, 40 tons, 63' LOD, 28' beam, 6' draft; Sr, 40 (BRT)	Jaluit Company of Hamburg; A.G. Jaluit-Ges., Hamburg	Benicia; Turner Shipyard, West 12th Street, Benecia		
Caroline	1899 Mar 9; 1899	Sloop. Gas-screw, 14.90 tons, 41.9' LOD, 16' beam, 3.2' draft; Slp, 14 (BRT)	SF freight business; USA	Benicia; Turner Shipyard, West 12th Street, Benecia		
Gadder	1899 Sept 17	Sloop, yacht, 25.5' LOD, 8.5' beam	Matthew Turner	Benicia		
Benicia	1899 Sept 23; 1899	Barkentine, 674 tons, 169' LOD, 40' beam, 14' draft; SrBk, 674 (BRT)	Captain E. C. Bowes; eigene Rechnung	Benicia; Turner Shipyard, West 12th Street, Benecia	Benicia - a barquentine with a fast passage from Newcastle, New South Wales to Kihei, Hawaiʻi, of 35 days.	
Tamari Tahiti or Tamarii Tahiti	1899 Nov 23; 1899	Schooner, 145 tons.; Sr, 145 (BRT)	Capt. George Dexter Tahiti trade French Registry; Maxwell & Co., Tahiti	Benicia; Turner Shipyard, West 12th Street, Benecia		
Catherine	1899	Sloop, yacht, 60' LOD, 9.7' beam, 3.5' draft	Archie Sutherland	Benicia		
La Croix Du Sud	1899 Dec	Sr	Missionary Society, London	Turner Shipyard, West 12th Street, Benecia		
Surprise or Sunrise	1899 Dec; 1899	Schooner, gas-aux, 147 tons, 95' LOD, 18.2' beam, 8.7' draft; Sr	M. W. McChesney & Company of Hawaii; Ausland	Benicia; Turner Shipyard, West 12th Street, Benecia		
Eclipse	1900 March; 1900 Mar	Schooner, gas aux, 125 HP, 211 tons, 104' LOD, 27' beam, 10.2' draft; SrAux, 211 (BRT)	R. N. McChesney Hawaiian Registry; USA	Benicia; Turner Shipyard, West 12th Street, Benecia		
Nome	1900 March; 1900 May	Schooner-rigged lighter, 231 tons, 131' LOD, 34' beam, 7' draft; SrL, 231 (BRT)	Alaska Commercial Company; Alaska Commercial Co., San Francisco	Benicia; Turner Shipyard, West 12th Street, Benecia		
York	1900 March; 1900 May	Schooner-rigged lighter, 231 tons, 131' LOD, 34' beam, 7' draft; SrL, 231 (BRT)	Alaska Commercial Company; Alaska Commercial Co., San Francisco	Benicia; Turner Shipyard, West 12th Street, Benecia		
Bonita	1900 Mar 27	Schooner, 14 tons	George Genereaux	Benicia		
Captain Blair	1900 May	Schooner, 130' LOD, 32' beam, 10' draft	Alaska Commercial Company	Benicia		
Rosamond	1900 May 19; 1900 May	Schooner, 4-masted, 1,387 tons, 210' LOD, 41' beam, 17' draft; 4Sr, 1084 (BRT)	Williams, Dimond and Company; William, Dimond Co., San Francisco	Benicia; Turner Shipyard, West 12th Street, Benecia		
Aeolus	1900 July; 1900 Apr	Schooner, gas aux. 150 tons, 104.9' LOD, 24" beam, 9.6" draft; SrAux, 150 (BRT)	A.G. Jaluit-Gesellschaft, Hamburg; A.G. Jaluit-Ges., Hamburg	Benicia; Turner Shipyard, West 12th Street, Benecia		
Ariel	1900 Aug 30; 1900	Schooner, 4-masted, 726 tons, 176' LOD, 40' beam, 14.5' draft; 4Sr, 726 (BRT)	U. Andrews San Francisco; own account	Benicia; Turner Shipyard, West 12th Street, Benecia	Ariel - Four-masted schooner built by Matthew Turner in 1900. She was wrecked at Inuboyesaki, Japan, in 1917.	
Pathfinder	1900 Nov 10; 1900 Dec	Schooner, pilot, 86 tons, 81' LOD, 24' beam, 14.5' draft; LoSr, 86 (BRT)	San Francisco Bar Pilots; San Francisco Bar Pilots	Benicia; Turner Shipyard, West 12th Street, Benecia		
La Croix du Sud	1900 Dec	Schooner, 45 tons, 63' LOD, 18' beam, 6' draft	Tahiti owners	Benicia		
The Crowley	1900	Schooner, gas-aux	The Crowley Brothers	Benicia		
Maurice	1901 Jan 12; 1901 Feb	Schooner, 63' LOD, 18' beam, 6' draft; Sr	Tahiti owners; Tahiti	Benicia; Turner Shipyard, West 12th Street, Benecia		
Nuhiva or Nuku Hiva	1901 Jan; 1900	Schooner, 50 tons, 65' LOD, 18' beam, 6' draft; Sr, 50 (BRT)	Société Comm. de l'Océanie, Hamburg; Soc. comm. de l'Océanie, Hamburg/Papeete	Benicia; Turner Shipyard, West 12th Street, Benecia		
Jilt	1901 May	Sloop, yacht, 67' LOD, 22" beam, 6' draft	F. J. Croall San Francisco Yacht Club	Benicia		
Helen	1901 June 2	Sloop, yacht, 32' LOD, 11' beam. 4.5' draft	A. E Chapman San Francisco	Benicia		
Amaranth	1901 July 22; 1901 Sep	Barkentine, 4-masted, 1,109 tons, 209' LOD, 42.5' beam, 18' draft; 4SrBk, 1109 (BRT)	Nelson Andrews San Francisco; own account	Benicia; Turner Shipyard, West 12th Street, Benecia	Amaranth - Four-masted barquentine that broke the record for the Astoria, Oregon to Shanghai run (23 days).[5] Wrecked at Jarvis Island on August 30, 1913.	
Newtown	1901	Steamer, stern-wheel, 77 tons, 75' LOD, 20' beam, 5' draft	O. Johnson San Francisco	Benicia		
Amazon	1902 Feb 1; 1902 Feb	Barkentine, 4-masted, 1,167 tons, 209' LOD, 42.5' beam, 19' draft; 4SrBk, 1167 (BRT)	Nelson Andrews San Francisco; own account	Benicia; Turner Shipyard, West 12th Street, Benecia		
Gazelle	1902 Feb; 1902 Feb	Schooner, gas-aux, 112' LOD, 30' beam, 12' draft; SrAux, 151 (BRT)	Hersheim & Co. Matupi, Hamburg; Hernsheim & Co., Matupi/Hamburg	Benicia; Turner Shipyard, West 12th Street, Benecia		
M. Turner or Matthew Turner	1902 June 28; 1902 Jul	Schooner, 4-masted, 816 tons, 182' LOD, 42.2' beam, 15' draft; 4Sr, 816 (BRT)	Matthew Turner; own account	Benicia; Turner Shipyard, West 12th Street, Benecia		
Eimeo	1902 July 7; 1902 Jul	Schooner, gas aux, 175 tons, 106' LOD, 24' beam, 10' draft; SrAux, 175 (BRT)	Société Comm. de l'Océanie, Hamburg; Soc. comm. de l'Océanie, Hamburg/Papeete	Benicia; Turner Shipyard, West 12th Street, Benecia		
Tarang	1902 Nov; 1902 Nov	Schooner, gas screw, 83 tons, 69.5' LOD, 22.2' beam, 8' draft; Sr, 83 (BRT)	Papua New Guinea; USA	Benicia; Turner Shipyard, West 12th Street, Benecia		
Hope	1902	Barge, 120 feet long, 400 tons, 37' beam, 9' draft	Newtown Trans. Co. Port Costa to Sacramento Fleet	Benicia		
Triton	1903 Jan; 1903 Jan	Schooner, gas screw, 150 tons, 75 HP, 107' LOD, 24' beam, 10' draft; SrAux, 150 (BRT)	A.G. Jaluit-Gesellschaft, Hamburg; A.G. Jaluit-Ges., Hamburg	Benicia; Turner Shipyard, West 12th Street, Benecia		
Siafiafi	1903 Feb; 1903	Schooner, 38.77 tons, 60.5' LOD, 18' beam, 6' draft; Sr, 38 (BRT)	French Polynesia; Tahiti	Benicia; Turner Shipyard, West 12th Street, Benecia		
Catherina	1903 Aug	Barge, 140' LOD, 32' beam, 6' draft	Newtown Trans. Co., Port Costa to Sacramento Fleet	Benicia		
St. Michael	1904 October; 1904 Oct	Schooner, gas auxiliary, 60 HP, 85' LOD, 25' beam, 7' draft; SrAux, 85 (BRT)	Marché Colonial Company, Paris; Marché Colonial, Papeete/Tahiti	Benicia; Turner Shipyard, West 12th Street, Benecia		
