= List of shipwrecks in 1917 =

The list of shipwrecks in 1917 includes ships sunk, foundered, grounded, or otherwise lost during 1917.

table of contents
← 1916 / 1917 / 1918 →
Jan	Feb	Mar	Apr
May	Jun	Jul	Aug
Sep	Oct	Nov	Dec
Unknown date

== Unknown date ==
List of shipwrecks: Unknown date 1917
Ship	State	Description
AG-13	Imperial Russian Navy	The AG-class submarine sank accidentally. She was refloated, repaired, and returned to service as AG-16.
Ariel	United States	The schooner was wrecked off the Inubōsaki Lighthouse, Japan.
Aurora	United Kingdom	The ship was presumed to have been sunk by a mine with the loss of all hands in the second half of 1917. She was on a voyage from Sydney, New South Wales to Iquique, Chile.
Belem	United Kingdom	The ship sank near Bude, Cornwall.
Catherine	United States	The steamer was reported lost at Ugashik, Territory of Alaska.
Dorade	French Navy	The naval trawler was lost sometime in 1917.
Harriet G	United States	During a voyage from Puget Sound to Hawaii with a cargo of lumber, the 252-ton brig capsized in the Pacific Ocean off Cape Flattery, Washington. The halibut schooner Sumner (United States) salvaged Harriett G, which was re-rigged as a three-masted schooner and placed back in service as Esther (United States).
Key West	United States	The vessel was lost in Unimak Pass in the Aleutian Islands near Scotch Cap on the southwest corner of Unimak Island.
Mary Sachs	United States	The 30-ton, 60-foot (18.3 m) twin-screw schooner was wrecked on Banks Island near Cape Kellett off the coast of Canada′s Northwest Territories.
Orthes	Norway	The barque was abandoned in the Atlantic Ocean. She subsequently foundered.
Prince John	United States	The steamer was lost in Wrangell Narrows in the Alexander Archipelago in Southeast Alaska.
Reuben L. Richardson	United States	The 92-net ton schooner was wrecked in Clarence Strait in the Alexander Archipelago in Southeast Alaska.
Spes & Fides	Norway	The fishing steamer, a former whaler, suffered an engine malfunction and sank in a storm off Tromsø, Norway. There were no deaths in the shipwreck. The wreck was located by divers at a depth of 20 m (66 ft) in 2014, after a search initiated by Sandefjord Museum.
Spokane	United States	The steamer became a total loss at Farallon Bay (55°11′40″N 133°04′45″W) off northeastern Dull Island in Southeast Alaska.
Taurus	United Kingdom	World War I: The coaster struck a mine and sank in the North Sea east of the Shetland Islands with the loss of nine crew. This was either during July 1917 or August 1917.
SM U-50	Imperial German Navy	World War I: The Type U 43 submarine is believed to have struck a mine and sank in the North Sea off Terschelling, Friesland, Netherlands on or after 31 August.
Uma	Flag unknown	Uma The steamship sank off the coast of Spain.
