= Galilee (ship) =

Brigantine built in 1891 designed by Matthew Turner

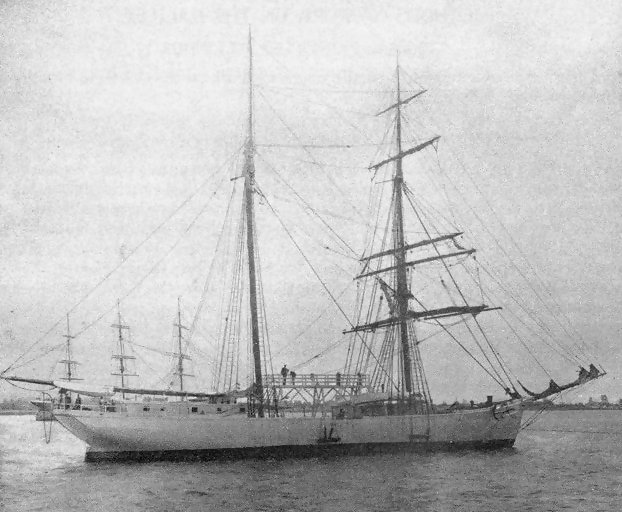
- Galilee on her first cruise as a magnetic observatory, the added observation platform is clearly visible.

History
- Name: Galilee
- Owner: Matthew Turner (1891-1909)
- Builder: Matthew Turner Shipyard, Benicia
- Launched: 1891
- Fate: Beached in 1933
- Notes: Designed by Matthew Turner Chartered by the Department of Terrestrial Magnetism, Carnegie Institution 1905-1908

General characteristics
- Tonnage: 328 tons
- Displacement: 600 tons
- Length: 132 ft 3 in (40.31 m)
- Beam: 33 ft 3 in (10.13 m)
- Depth: 12 ft 6 in (3.81 m)
- Sail plan: Brigantine

Galilee was a brigantine, built in 1891, designed by Matthew Turner. She started on the packet line between San Francisco and Tahiti and was reckoned a very fast ship. In 1905 she was chartered by the Carnegie Institution's Department of Terrestrial Magnetism and converted into a magnetic observatory. She was used to make observations of Earth's magnetic field on three cruises over a period of three years from 1905 to 1908 in the Pacific Ocean.

Problems with magnetic materials that it had not been possible to replace on Galilee, led to the building of the Carnegie in 1909, which was constructed with virtually no magnetic materials. Galilee was later rigged as a schooner, had a diesel engine fitted and was used in the fishing industry before being beached in 1933, ending her active career. The stern and part of the bow are preserved in two different places in California.

== Early history ==
Galilee was built in 1891 in Benicia, California, at the Matthew Turner Shipyard. She began her career on the packet line between San Francisco and Tahiti, carrying freight, passengers and French and US mail. On her maiden voyage she set a record of 21 days for the return trip from Tahiti.

== Magnetic observatory ==
=== Department of Terrestrial Magnetism ===
The department was founded by Louis Agricola Bauer in 1904, becoming its first director. He recognized that the magnetic field over the oceans was little known and looked for a suitable vessel to make magnetic observations.

=== Charter and conversion ===
In 1905 Galilee was chartered by the Carnegie Institution's Department of Terrestrial Magnetism to be converted into a magnetic observatory. The amount of magnetic materials on the ship was reduced to a minimum. The steel rigging was replaced by hemp ropes and a new observation bridge was constructed to lift the observation point as far as possible above the remaining iron parts of the ship, principally bolts in the vessel's sides. Additional cabin space was also provided to accommodate the scientists. Although the converted Galilee had magnetic constants lower than any equivalent ship at the time, corrections were still required to take account of the remaining magnetic material.

These corrections were measured using a procedure known as 'swinging ship' in which Galilee was held aligned towards the north, observations of the magnetic field were noted and the ship was turned progressively at 15° intervals (or as many as could be obtained given the prevailing conditions) using the right rudder, followed by a similar set using the left rudder. As the ship's own magnetic field changed with time, because of induction effects on the soft iron parts of the ship, this procedure has to be repeated as often as possible, generally in harbor or occasionally at sea if the conditions were calm enough.

The need to carry out such swings regularly caused delays in both the fieldwork and later office work. This experience convinced Bauer that a new ship built using non-magnetic materials was essential for carrying out further surveys and the Carnegie was designed and built in this way, replacing the Galilee after it had completed three voyages.

=== Cruises ===
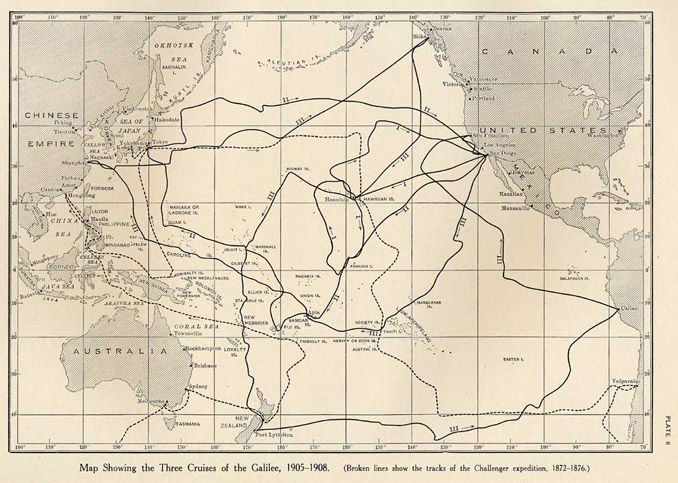
Map showing the three cruises of Galilee while under charter to the Department of Terrestrial Magnetism.

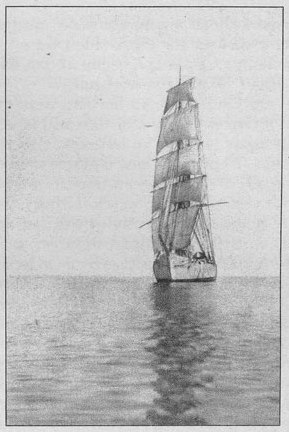
Galilee under sail while chartered to the Department of Terrestrial Magnetism.

The deviation coefficients for the ship were obtained by swinging the ship using a tug in San Francisco Bay, from August 2–4. On August 5, 1905, Galilee left San Francisco on a shakedown cruise. During this week-long cruise, the various instruments and procedures were tested under the supervision of the Director. Bauer also completed the training of the observers.

==== Cruise I ====
After the shakedown various modifications were made and the ship was swung again to check the coefficients. The cruise began on September 1, with Galilee sailing to Honolulu, arriving on September 16. Following a further 'swing' and land observations at the Honolulu Magnetic Observatory, the ship sailed to Fanning Island, arriving on October 10. From there Galilee returned to Honolulu, taking a course farther to the west.

The ship then sailed to the north of the Hawaiian islands before returning to San Diego, arriving at her home port on December 9. A final set of 'swings' and shore observations were made at San Diego, finishing on December 18, to provide the necessary corrections. A distance of 10,571 nautical miles (12,165 mi; 19,577 km) was covered on the first cruise. The commander was J.F.Pratt, taken temporarily into the employ of the Department of Terrestrial Magnetism. J.P Ault, the future commander of the Carnegie, was one of the magnetic observers.

==== Cruise II ====
As J. F. Pratt and two of the magnetic observers had to return to their posts at the United States Coast and Geodetic Survey at the end of the first cruise, several new staff were required. W.J. Peters, who had experience in running previous scientific expeditions, became the commander and remained in that position for the rest of the charter period. Following some modifications, carried out under the supervision of J.F. Pratt, Galilee set sail on the second cruise on March 2, 1906, heading straight to Fanning Island. The cruise continued to Pago Pago on Tutuila, part of the Samoan islands, where neither swings nor shore observations proved possible.

From Pago, the ship continued to Apia, where land observations were made at the German Geophysical Laboratory there, although again no 'swing' was possible. Galilee then sailed for Suva in the Fiji Islands, where the ship was successfully swung and more shore observations were carried out. The next part of the cruise included stops at the Marshall Islands and Guam before arriving at Yokohama in Japan on August 13.

While in harbor at Yokohama the ship was caught by a typhoon, in which she dragged her anchors and sank. Fortunately the damage was relatively slight. She was recovered and put in dry-dock where repairs were carried out. From Japan Galilee returned to San Diego, arriving on October 19, having covered 16,286 nautical miles (18,742 mi; 30,162 km).

==== Cruise III ====
On December 22, 1906, Galilee set out on her final cruise from San Diego. The first port of call was Nuku Hiva in the Marquesas Islands, but the ship soon moved on to Tahiti, where shore observations and 'swings' could be carried out. The next stop was Apia, where observations were again made at the Geophysical Observatory. On March 14, 1907, Galilee moved on to Yap Island and from there to Shanghai, arriving on May 8. Shore observations were made at the Zikawei Observatory, but the ship was swung in the mouth of the Yangtse River as the large tidal variation prevented this at Shanghai.

The next intended stop was Midway Island, but stormy weather made this impossible and prevented most magnetic observations. Galilee reached Sitka in Alaska on July 14, having covered 5,507 nautical miles (6,337 mi; 10,199 km) in 41 days, an average of about 134 nautical miles (154 mi; 248 km) per day. The Director reviewed the results of the cruise so far while the ship was at Sitka. New instruments were added, including one for making atmospheric-electric observations. At Sitka, Paul H. Dike joined the cruise's scientific staff to perform such observations. On August 10 the ship set off once more, heading for Honolulu, which she reached on August 28. After being overhauled and refitted, Galilee sailed for Jaluit in the Marshall Islands, where a further set of readings was taken for comparison with those taken in 1906.

The ship then set sail on November 5, aiming for Port Lyttelton in New Zealand. November 11 found Galilee still at Jaluit, becalmed and in danger of being stranded on a reef, but she was towed off by a German mail steamer. The lack of an auxiliary power source, which had caused this problem also made the trip to New Zealand extremely difficult as the winds and currents drove her towards the New Hebrides Islands. On arrival at Port Lyttelton, the ship was further delayed as Ernest Shackleton was about to depart from that port on the Nimrod Expedition.

By January 17, 1908, the necessary observations having been made, Galilee set sail due east. Eventually turning northeast, she arrived in Callao in Peru on March 10. The ship had sustained some damage to her rudder due to very strong winds encountered during early February, that took two weeks to repair. She sailed from Callao on April 5 heading just north of west, south of the Galapagos Islands, before turning north and then northwest, following roughly parallel to the coast.

Finally. Galilee headed northeast to San Francisco, arriving on May 21, 1908. Following a final set of 'swings' and shore observations, the vessel was returned to her owners on June 5, 1908. The final cruise had covered a distance of 36,977 nautical miles (42,552 mi; 68,481 km), giving a total distance for the period of her charter to the Department of Terrestrial Magnetism of 63,834 nautical miles (73,459 mi; 118,221 km).

== Later history ==
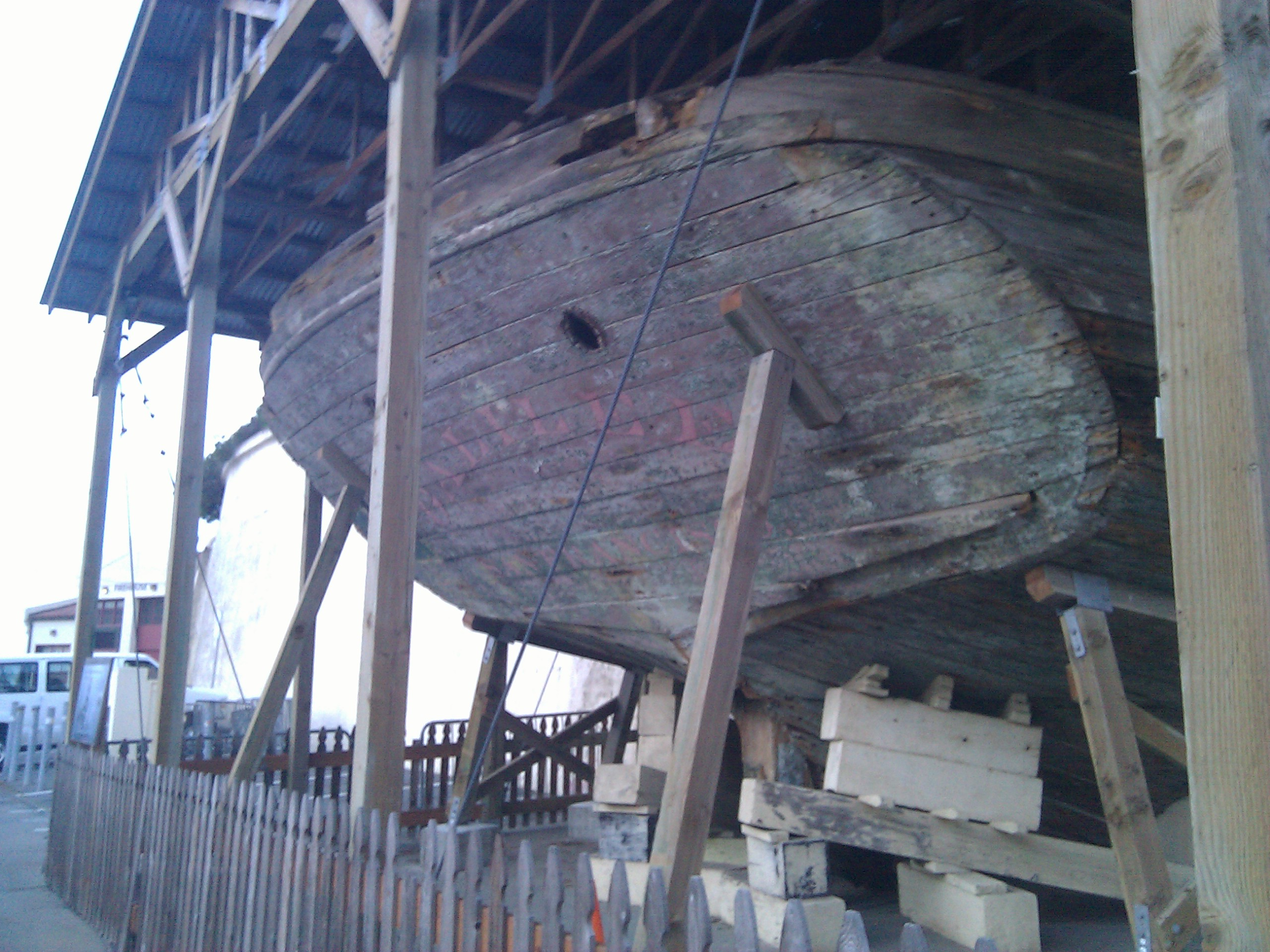
The preserved stern of Galilee at Fort Mason

Matthew Turner died in 1909 and two years later Galilee was sold by Bowes and Andrews to the Union Fish Company of San Francisco, where she was converted to a three-masted schooner and had a diesel engine fitted. For the next 16 years she was used in the codfish trade. She lost two of her masts in March, 1924, but was towed back to port for repairs. In 1929 she was used in the tuna industry, operating off Cape San Lucas.

She returned to San Francisco where she was purchased as a home by Captain John Quinn who ultimately beached her in 1934 in Sausalito in an area now known as 'Galilee harbor'. This began the houseboat community in the city. Captain Quinn was promptly sued by the City of Sausalito for blocking Mona Street. He countersued for them to provide sewer, water, and electricity. In 1959, after fourteen years battling in court, Quinn sold Galilee and moved to Carmel, Ca. By this time the barge Phoenix and several other live-aboard vessels had congregated around Galilee securing the continued existence of the live-aboard community in Sausalito. Quinn's battle to remain aboard became a cause célèbre in Sausalito and in the movie industry where, at one point John Wayne and Oscar-winning director William Wellman were set to make a film of Captain Quinn's struggle with the city. A script was prepared and Walter Brennan was tapped to play the very British Captain Quinn. Under threat by the author Ernest K. Gann, who claimed to be writing a similar story, the project was abandoned. After 1959 Galilee had a variety of occupants, one of whom, the artist Barney West, threatened to chain himself to her wheel rather than be driven from her deck by the City of Sausalito. Her condition continued to deteriorate and, by the late 1960s, she was no longer habitable.

Galilee′s stern was removed in 1975, which accelerated her deterioration, and is now mounted on one of the walls of Fort Mason that forms part of the San Francisco Maritime National Historical Park. Part of the bow was removed in 1987 and is now preserved at the Benicia Historical Museum.

Section of the Galilee	Coordinates (links to map & photo sources)
Stern at Fort Mason	37.8076°N 122.4297°W
Part of bow at Benicia	38.0537°N 122.1356°W
