= Paul H. Dike =

American researcher in the early science of magnetism

Paul Harrison Dike (February 22, 1878, Crystal Lake, Illinois – June 25, 1956, Jenkintown, Pennsylvania) was an American physicist who did research on terrestrial magnetism, atmospheric electricity, photoelectricity, pyrometry, and radiation theory.

== Biography ==
Paul H. Dike graduated from Northwestern University in physics with a B.S. in 1901 and an M.S. in 1903. For the academic year 1901–1902 he taught science at a high school in Du Quoin, Illinois. From 1904 to 1905 he was a magnetic observer for the United States Coast and Geodetic Survey. From 1905 to 1909 he was a member of the Department of Terrestrial Magnetism of the Carnegie Institution for Science in Washington, D.C. He studied abroad at Friedrich Wilhelm University in Berlin from 1905 to 1906 and at the University of Cambridge in 1906. Following instructions from the Carnegie Institution's Director of the Department of Terrestrial Magnetism, Dike joined the magnetic survey yacht Galilee at Sitka, Alaska near the beginning of August 1907 and performed experimental observations of atmospheric electriticy during the 1907–1908 voyage in the Pacific Ocean. From 1909 to 1911 he was a graduate student and an assistant in physics at the University of Wisconsin–Madison. There he graduated in June 1911 with a Ph.D. in physics. His Ph.D. thesis "Photo-Electric Potentials of Thin Cathode Films" was published in Physical Review(Series I) 34, 459 – June 1, 1912.

He was from 1911 to 1914 an assistant in physics at Mount Vernon, Iowa's Cornell College and from 1914 to 1915 an instructor at the University of Missouri. He was a professor of physics from 1915 to 1923 at Robert College in Istanbul, from 1923 to 1924 at the University of North Carolina, and from 1924 to 1925 at the University of Vermont. During WW I on an academic leave of absence, he served from August 18, 1917 to 1919 as a lieutenant in the U.S. Army Signal Corps. In 1919 he was an acting scientific attaché at the U.S. embassy in Paris. At Leeds & Northrup Company in Philadelphia, he was from 1925 to 1937 a research physicist, from 1937 to 1948 an assistant director of research, and from 1948 a research consultant.

Dike was elected in 1910 a Fellow of the American Association for the Advancement of Science and in 1936 a Fellow of the American Physical Society.

In 1906 he married Grace Gordon Gulick (1883–1933) daughter of Alice Gordon Gulick, an American missionary teacher in Spain. They had two sons, William Gordon and Paul Alexander. Their first son, William Gordon Dike became a physicist who worked in Oak Ridge, Tennessee on the atomic bomb project during World War II. As a widower, Paul H. Dike married Mildred E. Watts in November 1936 in Philadelphia. He is buried in Crystal Lake Cemetery on Lake Avenue in Crystal Lake, Illinois.

== Selected publications ==
- Dike, P. H. (1906). "The diurnal variation of the amount of radioactive emanation in the atmosphere". Journal of Geophysical Research. 11 (3): 125–129. Bibcode:1906TeMAE..11..125D. doi:10.1029/TE011i003p00125.
- —— (1907). "Proposed atmospheric electricity work on the magnetic survey yacht "Galilee" in 1907". Journal of Geophysical Research. 12 (2): 81–82. Bibcode:1907TeMAE..12...81D. doi:10.1029/TE012i002p00081.
- —— (1907). "Paulsen's résumé of recent theories of polar lights". Journal of Geophysical Research. 12 (2): 84–86. Bibcode:1907TeMAE..12...84D. doi:10.1029/TE012i002p00084. 1907
- —— (1907). "Preliminary report on atmospheric electricity work, yacht "Galilee," Sitka to Honolulu, August, 1907". Journal of Geophysical Research. 12 (3): 129–130. Bibcode:1907TeMAE..12..129D. doi:10.1029/TE012i003p00129.
- —— (1908). "Report on the atmospheric electricity observations made on the magnetic survey yacht "Galilee," 1907–08". Journal of Geophysical Research. 13 (3): 119–124. Bibcode:1908TeMAE..13..119D. doi:10.1029/TE013i003p00119.
- —— (1909). "An experimental investigation of dip needle corrections". Journal of Geophysical Research. 14 (3): 137–146. Bibcode:1909TeMAE..14..137D. doi:10.1029/TE014i003p00137.
- —— (1909). "ART. XII.--Recent Observations in Atmospheric Electricity". American Journal of Science. 4th Series. 27 (159): 197–209. doi:10.2475/ajs.s4-27.159.197. hathitrust.org text
- —— (1912). "Photo-Electric Potentials of Thin Cathode Films". Physical Review. Series I. 34 (6): 459–470. Bibcode:1912PhRvI..34..459D. doi:10.1103/PhysRevSeriesI.34.459. hdl:2027/wu.89011288271. e-book (journal publication of June 1911 Ph.D. thesis)
- —— (1930). "A Precision Audio Frequency Bridge". Review of Scientific Instruments. 1 (12): 744–748. Bibcode:1930RScI....1..744D. doi:10.1063/1.1748662.
- —— (1931). "A Bridge for the Measurement of the Conductance of Electrolytes". Review of Scientific Instruments. 2 (7): 379–395. Bibcode:1931RScI....2..379D. doi:10.1063/1.1748805.
- —— (1936). "The Effect of Atmospheric Humidity on Unsealed Resistors, Causes and Remedy". Review of Scientific Instruments. 7 (7): 278–287. Bibcode:1936RScI....7..278D. doi:10.1063/1.1752150.
- —— (1947). "Instrumentation and measurement in the field of dielectrics". Digest of Literature on Dielectrics. 11. IEEE: 36–39.
- —— (1955). Thermoelectric Thermometry: A Monograph on the Materials and Methods Involved in the Measurement of Temperature with the Aid of Thermocouples. Leeds & Northern Company; 90 pages
