= Papeete (schooner) =

History

French Polynesia
- Name: Papeete
- Owner: Built for Tahitian owners
- Builder: Matthew Turner, Benicia, California
- Launched: 1891
- Status: Still afloat in 1929

General characteristics
- Class & type: 2-masted schooner
- Tons burthen: 127 tons

The Papeete was a schooner built in 1891 by Matthew Turner, a San Francisco Bay Area shipbuilder who had extensive business interests in Tahiti. The ship was known for a fast passage from San Francisco to Tahiti of 17 days.

She was built to serve in the packet trade, as was the similarly named barquentine City of Papeete.

Schooner Papeete was still afloat in 1929.
