= Amaranth (barquentine) =

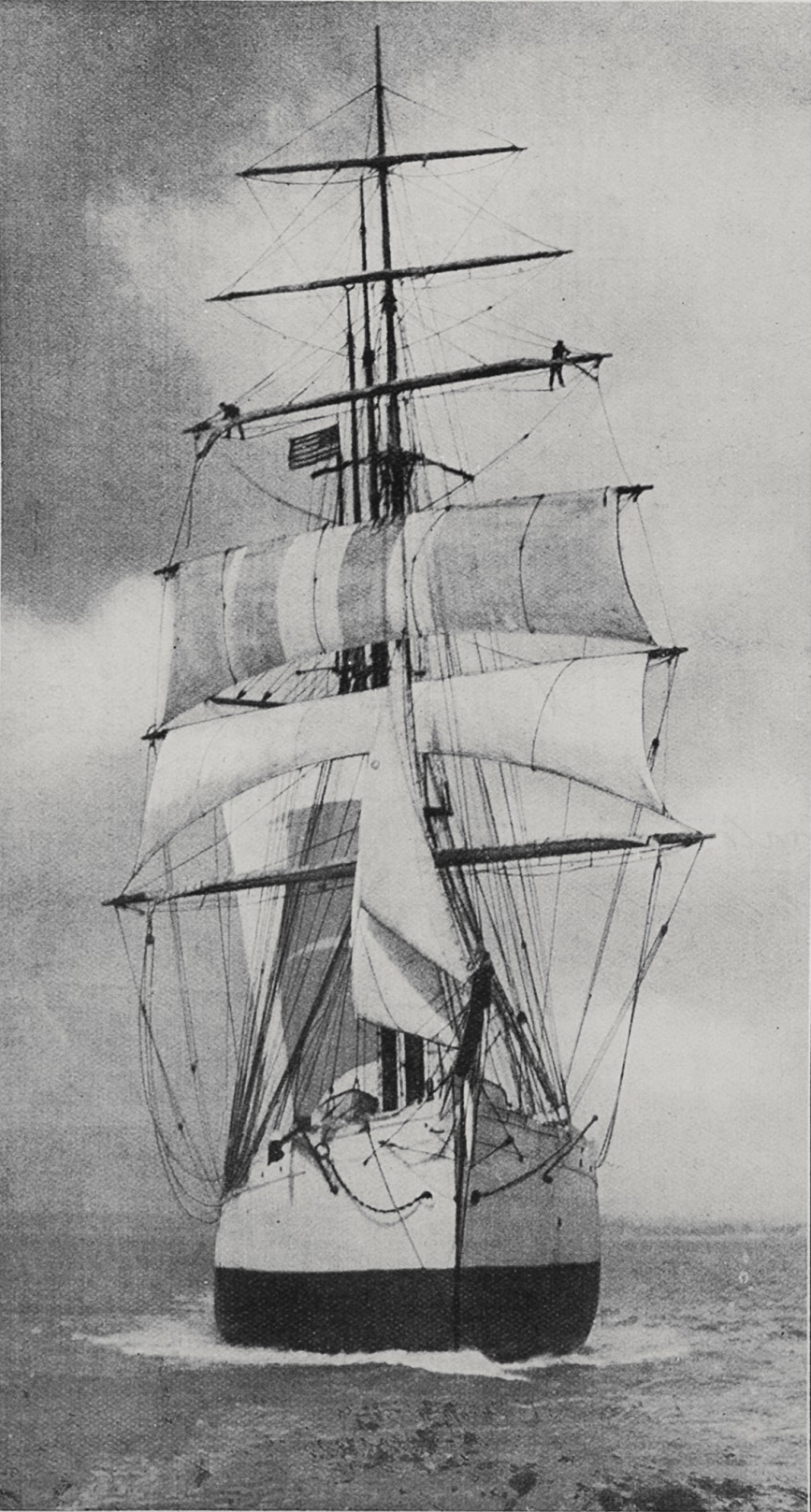
- Amaranth under sail

History

United States
- Name: Amaranth
- Builder: Matthew Turner, Benicia, CA
- Launched: 1901
- Fate: Wrecked at Jarvis Island, Aug. 30, 1913, 0°22′50″S 159°59′56″W

General characteristics
- Class & type: 4-masted barquentine
- Tons burthen: 1,109
- Sail plan: Barquentine

Amaranth was a four-masted barquentine built by Matthew Turner of Benicia, California in 1901. Amaranth sailed in the China trade between Puget Sound and Shanghai. She was wrecked on a guano island in the South Pacific in 1913 while carrying a load of coal.

== Construction ==
Barquentine Amaranth Co. incorporated in San Francisco on Sept. 14, 1901 with capital stock of $76,000 and was assigned state corporation no. 33,965. Captain Turner, a master shipbuilder, was known for his Bering Sea pelagic sealing schooners, codfishing schooners, South Seas schooners, and sugar packets. Amaranth measured 1,109 tons, and was a sister ship to Turner's 1,167 ton barquentine Amazon. The ship was named after the amaranth plant.

In 1975, a half-hull model of Amaranth was on display in the San Francisco Maritime Museum. By 1941, the Historic American Merchant Marine project had collected and deposited the complete plans of Amaranth at the US National Museum.

== Voyages to China ==
Amaranth sailed from Astoria, Oregon to Shanghai in 23 days. She also made four voyages under Captain E.C. Boles from Puget Sound to Taku, (Shanghai), "in 100, 110, 118, and 123 days."

== Delivery of drydock materials to Pearl Harbor ==
In April 1910, Amaranth delivered materials for construction of a drydock facility at Pearl Harbor. Amaranth was the fourth deep-sea, cargo-carrying vessel to venture into the newly dredged harbor, where a naval station was planned, having been preceded by the three-masted schooner W.H. Marston on March 8, and the schooner Ariel and bark Marston a few days later.

== Shipwreck at Jarvis Island ==
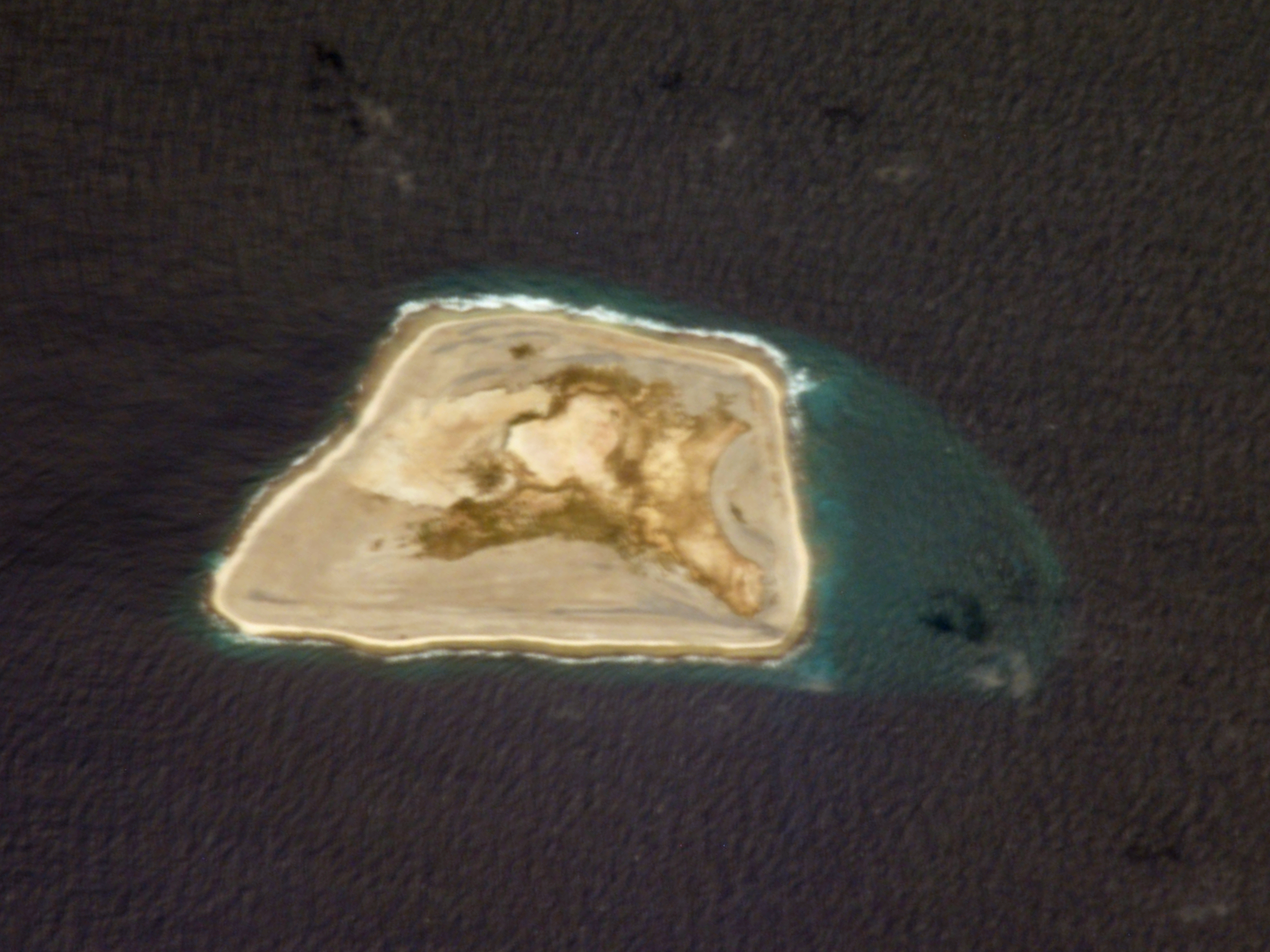
NASA picture of Jarvis Island; note the submerged reef beyond the eastern end.

On 30 August 1913, Amaranth, under Captain C.W. Nielson, was carrying a cargo of coal from Newcastle, New South Wales to San Francisco when she wrecked on the southeastern shore of Jarvis Island. On shore, the Amaranth crew could see the ruins of ten wooden guano-mining buildings, including a two-story house. "The captain and crew took to their boats and landed next morning. The vessel broke up. With salvaged provisions and water, the crew managed to reach Samoa in the two boats 3 weeks later." One lifeboat reached Pago Pago, American Samoa and the other made Apia in Western Samoa.

The Amaranth's scattered remains were noted and scavenged for many years, and rounded fragments of coal from the ship's hold were still being found on the south beach in the late 1930s. "A memorial cairn and plaque that commemorate the grounding are still present on the island."

== Plaque ==
Amaranth Monument Plaque
Amaranth Monument Plaque	Amaranth Monument Plaque
WRECK OF BARKENTINE "AMARANTH"; OF SAN FRANCISCO...H H H H H H H H H H H H H H H H... 1062 TONS 1913 #107681; C.W. NEILSEN MASTER......... BOUND FROM NEWCASTLE N.S.W. FOR S.F. WITH CARGO COAL... H H LOG EXTRACTS H H ... ………………………… AUG.30.1913 7:45P.M. STRANDED ON JARVIS ISLAND LAT. 0° 23’S. LONG 59°54 W. TEN RM. LEFT IN TWO BOATS AS SHIP BREAKING UP. STOOD BY ALL NIGHT. LANDED ON THE ISLAND NEXT DAY AND FOUND; SHIP A TOTAL LOSS. SEPT 1. LEFT JARVIS FOR SAMOAN ISLANDS. SEPT 10. RESTED ON DANGER ISLAND. GOT FRESH WATER & COCOANUTS; SEPT 11. STARTED FOR PAGO PAGO IN THE MORNING. SEPT 12. 12°34'S.167°27'W. SEPT 13. 14°03'S.166°50'W. PASSED MANUA GROUP TO THE SOUTH. SEPT 14. SEVEN A.M. SIGHTED TUTUILA. ARRIVED PAGO PAGO AT TEN P.M. EVERYBODY IN BOAT WELL.... H H H H H H H H H H H ... THE U.S. GUNBOAT "PRINCETON" WENT TO SEA TO LOOK; FOR NUMBER TWO BOAT & FOUND IT AT APIA SEPT. 24. ALL MEN WELL. CREW SENT UP TO SAN FRANCISCO ON S.S. VENTURA; PAID CREW AT U.S. SHIPPING COMMISSIONER’S OFFICE; IN SAN FRANCISCO ON OCTOBER TENTH 1913.....H.H.H.H.H.H.H.H.H.... THIS DATA FROM CAPT. LEIGHTON C.P. ROBINSON. FORMERLY OF; THE BARK "MELANOPE" IN THE CALIFORNIA .. AUSTRALIA TRADE & NOW DEPUTY U.S. SHIPPING COMMISSIONER AT S.F.....H.H.H.H.H.H.H.H.H.... THIS TABLET MADE IN HONOLULU BY R.B.BLACK & MONUMENT ERECTED BY HAWAIIAN BOYS DURING; U.S.DEPT. OF INTERIOR OCCUPATION OF JARVIS I.AS; A METEOROLOGICAL OUTPOST FOR PROPOSED AIR; ROUTES TO THE ANTIPODES H H H H H H H H H H H JANUARY H A.D. 1937	Amaranth Monument Plaque
