= List of shipwrecks in 1918 =

The list of shipwrecks in 1918 includes ships sunk, foundered, grounded, or otherwise lost during 1918.

table of contents
← 1917 / 1918 / 1919 →
Jan	Feb	Mar	Apr
May	Jun	Jul	Aug
Sep	Oct	Nov	Dec
Unknown date

== Unknown date ==
List of shipwrecks: Unknown date 1918
Ship	State	Description
Barge No. 739 and Barge No. 740	United States Army	The barges sank off Black Point, Connecticut before 28 September.
Fairhaven	United States	The hulk of Fairhaven, ca. 1920. Fire destroyed the sternwheel passenger paddle steamer at her moorings in Seattle, Washington.
Diana	Germany	The cargo ship was sunk off the coast of Norway following a boiler explosion in January or early February.
Dorothy Barrett	United States	The tugboat was wrecked by ice in January–February at Richardson's Landing. Her machinery was salvaged in the Spring.
Elisha	United States	The tugboat was wrecked by ice in January–February. Raised and repaired.
Hazel Watson	United States	The tugboat was wrecked by ice in January–February.
Isabella	United States	The icebreaker was wrecked by ice in January–February.
Kaisei Maru	Japan	Impounded in Sealing Cove (57°03′N 135°22′W) on the coast of Japonski Island in Sitka, Territory of Alaska, since 1909 or 1910 for illegal seal hunting, the ship sank ca. 1918 after becoming waterlogged.
Norian		The vessel ran aground on the mattress sill at the head of Pass a Loutre, Louisiana in fog. Refloated 18 days later.
Pastime	United States	The wreck of the yacht was reported as an obstruction on 7 September in the Cheboygan River opposite the City Park, Cheboygan, Michigan and work to remove it was finished on 19 October.
Sénégamble	France	The ship collided with another vessel and sank in February or early March.
Success	Australia	The sailing vessel, a fake museum ship, supposedly of an earlier career as an Australian prison ship, was sunk by ice at Carrollton, Kentucky in January–February 1918, though some sources say 1917 or 1919.
SM UB-107	Imperial German Navy	World War I: The Type UB III submarine struck a mine and sank in the North Sea (54°08′N 0°00′E) between 27 July and 3 August with the loss of all 38 crew.
SM UC-79	Imperial German Navy	World War I: The Type UC II submarine struck a mine and sank in the English Channel off Cap Gris Nez, Pas-de-Calais, France in late March or early April.
Vulcan	United States Army	The condemned and stripped US Army Corps of Engineers dipper dredge was disposed of by scuttling in the St. Louis, Missouri District.
Wabash	United States	The tugboat was wrecked by ice in January–February.
