= Benicia (barquentine) =

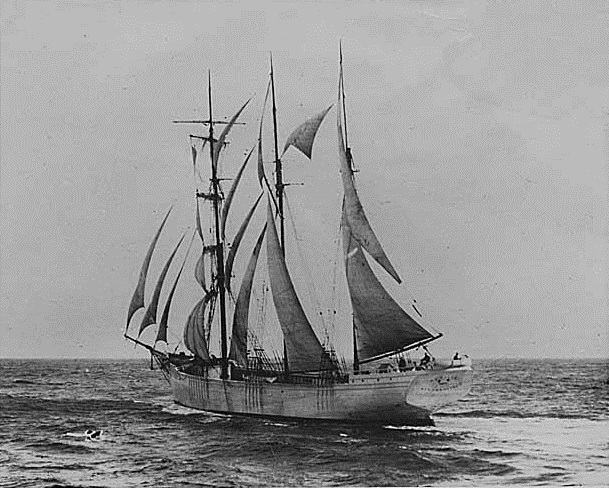
- Barquentine Benicia

History

United States
- Name: Benicia
- Builder: Matthew Turner, Benicia, California
- Launched: 1899
- Fate: Wrecked 10 October 1920

General characteristics
- Class & type: Barquentine
- Tons burthen: 674 tons

Benicia was a barquentine built by Matthew Turner in Benicia, California in 1899. She was known for a fast passage from Newcastle, New South Wales to Kehei, Hawaii, of 35 days.

Benicia was wrecked on Lafolle Reef off Haiti on 10 October 1920.

== Turner's influence on schooner Benicia ==
French Polynesia
- Name: Benicia
- Builder: Built in Tahiti by a shipwright who had worked for Matthew Turner
- Notes: Arrived in San Francisco, 1941

General characteristics
- Class & type: 2-masted schooner

At least two other sailing vessels also carried the name Benicia. Gibbs reports that Turner's influence on the South Seas schooner was still evident as late as 1941, when a two-masted schooner, Benicia, built in Tahiti by a shipwright who had worked in Turner's yard, arrived in San Francisco under the French flag.

== 1883 iron ship Benicia ==
An 899-ton iron ship named Benicia was launched in Oct. 1883, for Liverpool owners, by Whitehaven Iron Shipbuilding Co.

United Kingdom
- Name: Benicia
- Owner: Liverpool, England
- Builder: Whitehaven Iron Shipbuilding Co.
- Launched: Oct. 1883

General characteristics
- Tons burthen: 809 tons
