= Ariel (schooner) =

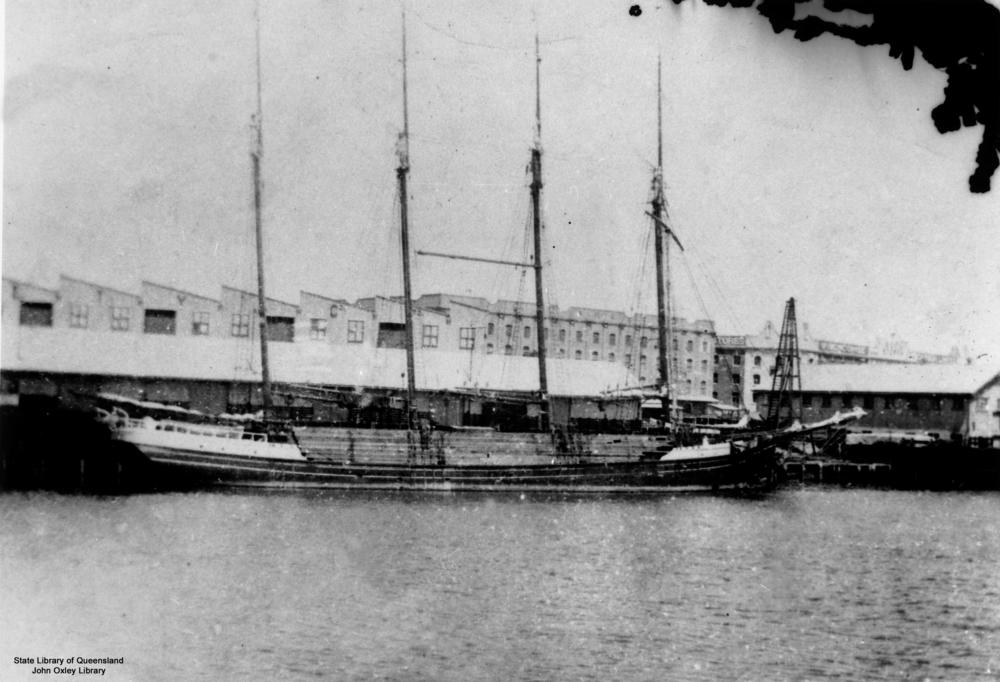
- Ariel

History

United States
- Builder: Matthew Turner, Benicia, California
- Launched: 1900
- Fate: Wrecked at Inuboyesaki, Japan, in 1917

General characteristics
- Tons burthen: 726 tons

Ariel was a 4-masted schooner built by Matthew Turner in 1900. She was wrecked at Inuboyesaki, Japan, in 1917.
