= Matthew Turner (shipbuilder) =

American shipbuilder (1825–1909)

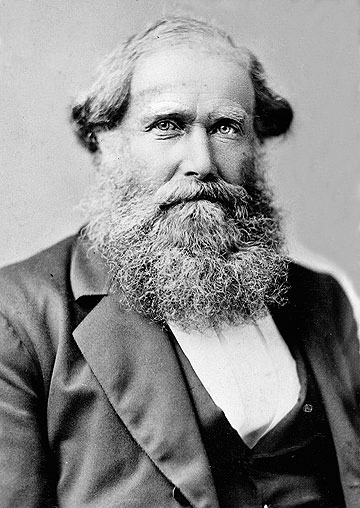
- Born: June 17, 1825; Geneva, Ohio, U.S.
- Died: February 10, 1909 (aged 83); Oakland, California
- Occupations: Shipbuilder, sea captain

Matthew Turner (June 17, 1825 – February 10, 1909) was an American sea captain, shipbuilder and designer. He constructed over 270 vessels, the majority of which were built in the Matthew Turner shipyard in Benicia. He built more sailing vessels than any other single shipbuilder in America, and can be considered "the 'grandaddy' of big time wooden shipbuilding on the Pacific Coast."

== Early life ==
Matthew Turner was born in Geneva, Ohio on June 17, 1825, the fourth child of George Turner and Emily Atkins. George Turner owned a sawmill on the shores of Lake Erie and later launched his first ship, the sloop Geneva, in 1839, to ship lumber and building stone. Matthew, after watching the construction of the Geneva and a later vessel the Philena Mills, designed his first ship, the schooner G.R. Roberts. His father was sufficiently impressed with the design to build the boat, which was launched in 1848. Matthew took on the command of the boat and later that year married Amanda Jackson. Amanda died in childbirth with their first child. On a trip down the Mississippi River in late 1849 he heard about gold mining in California and set off for the West Coast in 1850. He spent 3½ years mining gold in Calaveras County and was quite successful.

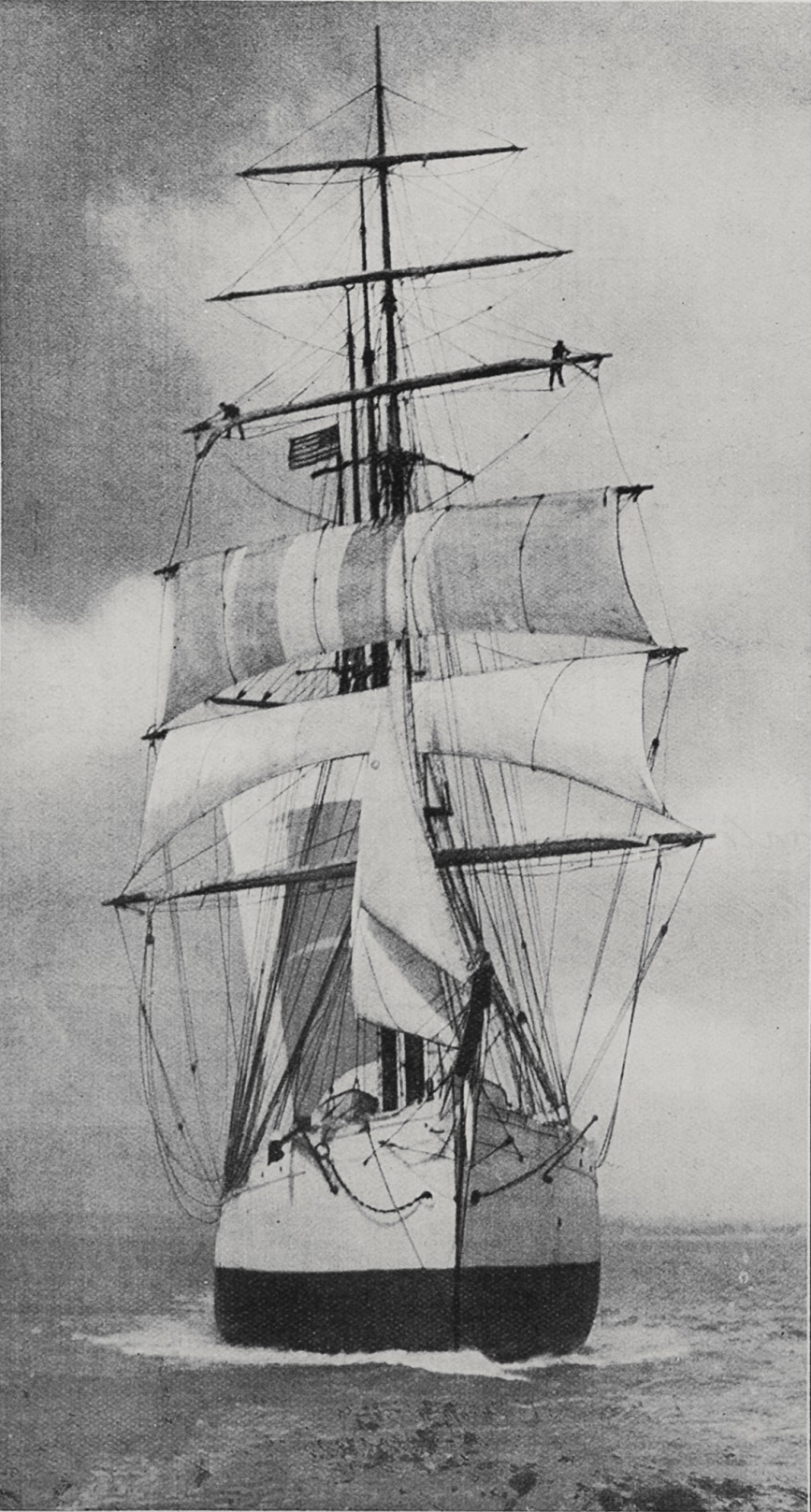
The Amaranth was built at Benicia in 1901 and later shipwrecked at Jarvis Island in 1913.

== Career as ship captain ==
Turner later traveled to New York where he bought the schooner Toronto, sailing her back to California. There he went into business with Captain Richard Thomas Rundle and started shipping timber to San Francisco from the Mendocino coast. They were soon able to replace the Toronto with another larger schooner, the Louis Perry, and a few years later they purchased the brig Temandra. When Turner took this larger vessel to the Sea of Okhotsk he noticed the abundance of cod and so bought the Porpoise to capitalize on this, as cod were selling in San Francisco at a high price. Meanwhile, Turner also set up a company to trade with Tahiti.

During his career as a ship's captain he twice received recognition of his heroism and the services that he rendered to foreign governments. He was given a gold-mounted spyglass by Queen Victoria in recognition of his part in saving the lives of British sailors. The Norwegian government presented him with a silver service for his rescue of a Norwegian vessel in danger of foundering at Honolulu.

== Shipyard in Benicia ==
He designed his first ocean-going ship, the brig Nautilus, in 1868, which was built at Eureka, in an attempt to get a faster ship for the Tahiti run. The hull of Nautilus was exactly the reverse of what was customary in the area at that time, being "long and sharp forward, lean and full on the waterline aft." Despite the predictions of skeptics that the ship would dive and pitch into the water, resulting in a very wet ride, Nautilus proved a great success. Turner decided to move into shipbuilding, setting up a yard near Hunter's Point with his brother Horatio. In 1876 he married for a second time, to Captain Rundle's widow, Ashbeline. The success of his first shipyard led him to search for another location, to allow the business to expand. He went into business with his brother and John Eckley, forming the Matthew Turner Shipyard at Benicia in 1883. This yard constructed at least 154 wooden-hulled ships.

Turner was greatly admired by shipbuilder Henry Hall, of the Hall Brothers shipyard in Port Blakely. He described the "Turner Model" of sailing rig, using the Bermudan sail, a "fore and aft sail without gaff, being a large triangular sail." Eliminating the gaff made it much easier to bring the sail down during sudden Pacific squalls.

== Prolific shipbuilder ==
During his career as a shipbuilder, Turner designed and built over 270 sea going vessels from 1848 to 1904, more sailing vessels than any other American shipbuilder. According to Gibbs, "although many [vessels] were small in size, this record was probably never equaled by any other individual shipbuilder in the American era of sail. He further, in all probability, built more vessels for foreign account than any other American since the Revolution." Turner had business interests in the South Sea Islands, and many of his ships were built for owners in that region. He also specialized in vessels for pelagic sealing. "Turner also built some of the fastest racing yachts in the world, proven out during the famous races sponsored by the San Francisco Yacht Club, of which Turner was a charter member."

== Later life ==
Turner was something of an invalid from 1904 onwards. Nonetheless, in 1906, at age 81, Turner, was still personally supervising work at his shipyard, and found himself suddenly swamped with work following the San Francisco earthquake. He decided to retire. He died on February 10, 1909, at the age of 83 years after a short illness at his home in Oakland.

== Legacy ==
Turner's influence on the South Seas schooner was still evident as late as 1941, when a two-masted schooner, Benicia, built in Tahiti by a shipwright who had worked in Turner's yard, arrived in San Francisco under the French flag.

Matthew Turner (new): Call of the Sea’s brigantine Matthew Turner is a modern wooden tall ship built as a living tribute to Bay Area shipbuilder Matthew Turner, whose late-19th-century design Galilee inspired the vessel and once held the San Francisco–Tahiti speed record. Designed after Galilee and named in Turner’s honor, the ship revives the craftsmanship, materials, and sailing technology of San Francisco’s historic shipyards while serving today as an experiential learning platform for Bay Area youth. Built over seven years in Sausalito using sustainable Douglas fir, Oregon white oak, and bronze fastenings, the 132-foot brigantine combines traditional construction with advanced hybrid propulsion and renewable energy systems. By reconnecting modern sailors and students with Turner’s design legacy—now physically remembered through Galilee’s preserved stern at Fort Mason—the Matthew Turner bridges nineteenth-century maritime innovation with contemporary education, sustainability, and community engagement on San Francisco Bay.

== See also ==
- California Historical Landmarks in Solano County
