= USS Siboney (CVE-112) =

Commencement Bay-class escort carrier of the US Navy

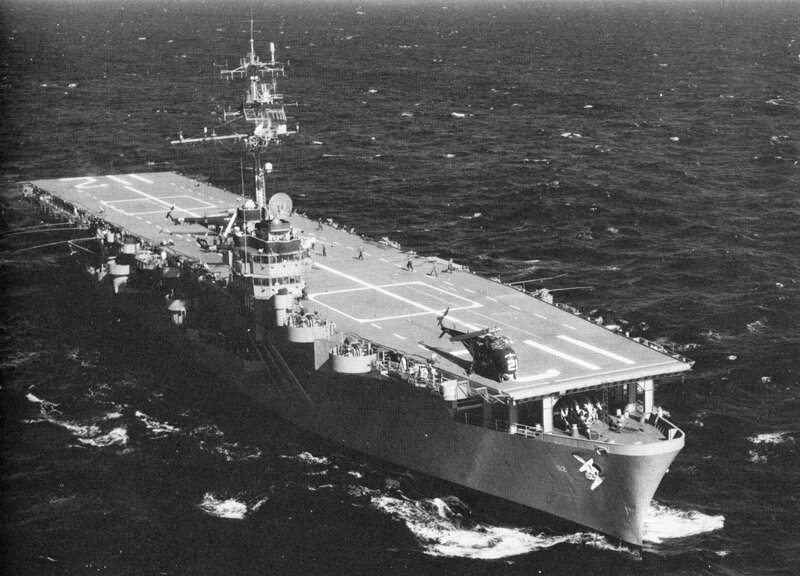
- USS Siboney (CVE-112)

History

United States
- Namesake: Siboney, Cuba
- Builder: Todd-Pacific Shipyards, Tacoma, Washington
- Laid down: 1 April 1944
- Launched: 9 November 1944
- Commissioned: 14 May 1945
- Decommissioned: 31 July 1956
- Stricken: 1 June 1970
- Fate: Scrapped 1971

General characteristics
- Class & type: Commencement Bay-class escort carrier
- Displacement: 21,397 long tons (21,740 t)
- Length: 557 ft 1 in (169.80 m) loa
- Beam: 75 ft (23 m)
- Draft: 32 ft (9.8 m)
- Installed power: 16,000 shp (12,000 kW); 4 × boilers
- Propulsion: 2 × Steam turbines; 2 × screw propellers
- Speed: 19 knots (35 km/h; 22 mph)
- Complement: 1,066
- Armament: 2 × 5 in (127 mm) dual-purpose guns; 36 × 40 mm (1.6 in) Bofors AA guns; 20 × 20 mm (0.8 in) Oerlikon AA guns
- Aircraft carried: 33
- Aviation facilities: 2 × aircraft catapults

USS Siboney (ex-Frosty Bay) was a Commencement Bay-class escort carrier of the United States Navy. The Commencement Bay class were built during World War II, and were an improvement over the earlier Sangamon class, which were converted from oil tankers. They were capable of carrying an air group of 33 planes and were armed with an anti-aircraft battery of 5 in (127 mm), 40 mm (1.6 in), and 20 mm (0.8 in) guns. The ships were capable of a top speed of 19 knots (35 km/h; 22 mph), and due to their origin as tankers, had extensive fuel storage.

== Design ==
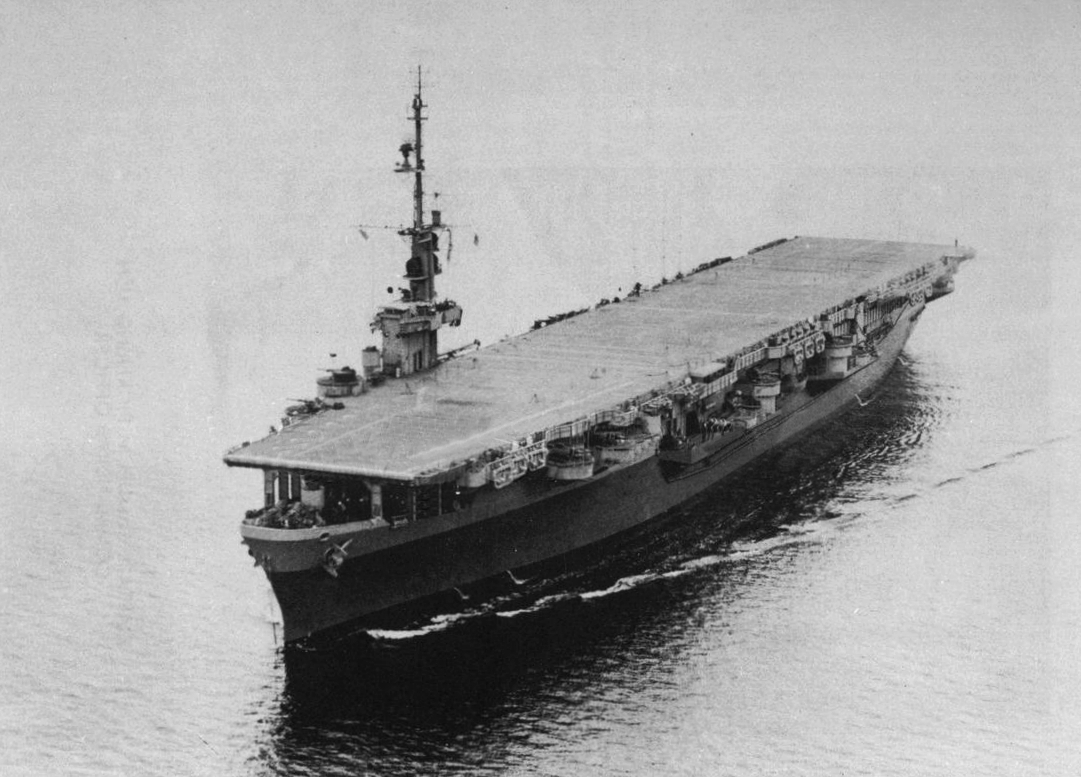
Siboney in her original configuration

In 1941, as United States participation in World War II became increasingly likely, the US Navy embarked on a construction program for escort carriers, which were converted from transport ships of various types. Many of the escort carrier types were converted from C3-type transports, but the Sangamon-class escort carriers were instead rebuilt oil tankers. These proved to be very successful ships, and the Commencement Bay class, authorized for Fiscal Year 1944, were an improved version of the Sangamon design. The new ships were faster, had improved aviation facilities, and had better internal compartmentation. They proved to be the most successful of the escort carriers, and the only class to be retained in active service after the war, since they were large enough to operate newer aircraft.

Siboney was 557 ft 1 in (169.80 m) long overall, with a beam of 75 ft (23 m) at the waterline, which extended to 105 ft 2 in (32.05 m) at maximum. She displaced 21,397 long tons (21,740 t) at full load, of which 12,876 long tons (13,083 t) could be fuel oil (though some of her storage tanks were converted to permanently store seawater for ballast), and at full load she had a draft of 27 ft 11 in (8.51 m). The ship's superstructure consisted of a small island. She had a complement of 1,066 officers and enlisted men.

The ship was powered by two Allis-Chalmers geared steam turbines, each driving one screw propeller, using steam provided by four Combustion Engineering-manufactured water-tube boilers. The propulsion system was rated to produce a total of 16,000 shp (12,000 kW) for a top speed of 19 knots (35 km/h; 22 mph). Given the very large storage capacity for oil, the ships of the Commencement Bay class could steam for some 23,900 nautical miles (44,300 km; 27,500 mi) at a speed of 15 knots (28 km/h; 17 mph).

Her defensive anti-aircraft armament consisted of two 5 in (127 mm) dual-purpose guns in single mounts, thirty-six 40 mm (2 in) Bofors guns, and twenty 20 mm (1 in) Oerlikon light AA cannons. The Bofors guns were placed in three quadruple and twelve twin mounts, while the Oerlikon guns were all mounted individually. She carried 33 planes, which could be launched from two aircraft catapults. Two elevators transferred aircraft from the hangar to the flight deck.

== Service history ==
=== Construction and World War II ===
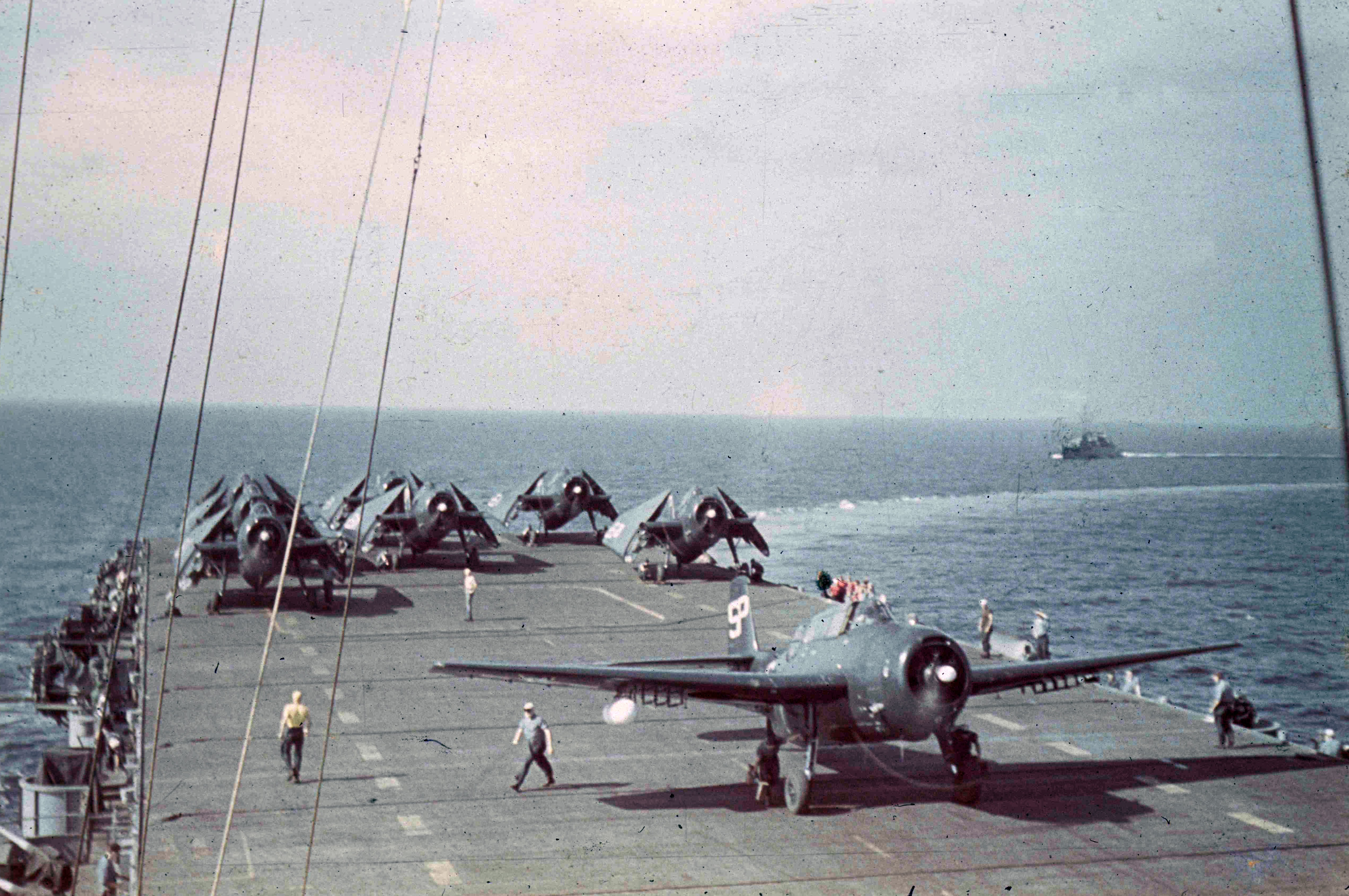
TBM-3 Avengers aboard Siboney in 1949

The first fifteen ships of the Commencement Bay class were ordered on 23 January 1943, allocated to Fiscal Year 1944. The ship, originally named Frosty Bay, was built by the Todd-Pacific Shipyards at Tacoma, Washington. Her keel was laid down on 1 April 1944, and on 26 April she was renamed Siboney, after the village in Cuba where American forces invaded Cuba during the Spanish–American War. The ship was commissioned on 14 May 1945. Fitting out work lasted for another nine days, and was done in Seattle. On 31 May, the ship departed for San Diego, California, passing through Alameda on the way. She then conducted a shakedown cruise in the San Diego area, which concluded on 3 August.

The ship's crew then began loading aircraft and ammunition, and the pilots of Air Group 36 came aboard. By 8 August, the ship got underway for the western Pacific, where she was to join the Japan campaign. On 15 August, the Japan announced it would surrender, ending the war; Siboney arrived in Pearl Harbor the following day, and so she unloaded her cargo and remained in Hawaiian waters for the rest of the month. In early September, she departed for Okinawa, Japan, passing through the Marshall Islands, Caroline Islands, and the Philippines on the way. She arrived in Buckner Bay later that month.

Siboney left Okinawa on 5 October, bound for the main island of Honshu. While on the way, she contributed aircraft to search operations attempting to locate the Martin PBM Mariner that had been carrying Rear Admiral William Sample, which had gone missing on 2 October. Siboney stopped at various ports on Honshu from 8 to 11 October, before rejoining the search effort, which failed to locate the missing plane. Siboney then sailed to Tokyo Bay, from which she operated between 24 October and 16 November. She was then ordered to return to the United States, by way of Manila in the Philippines; Hong Kong, China; Saipan and Guam in the Mariana Islands; and Pearl Harbor. She eventually reached San Diego on 23 January 1946. She made another cruise in the western Pacific from 15 February to 7 May.

=== Atlantic Fleet operations ===
On 9 June 1947, Siboney left San Diego, bound for the East Coast of the United States. She passed through the Panama Canal and arrived at Norfolk, Virginia, which was her new home port, on 26 June. Over the following four months, she cruised between Norfolk and Guantanamo Bay, Cuba, and in November she was laid up in reserve status. The ship was reactivated in March 1948 to transport US Air Force aircraft to Turkey in May. After crossing the Atlantic, entering the Mediterranean Sea, and unloading the planes in Yesilkoy, Turkey, she returned to Norfolk, made preparations for another cruise to the Mediterranean. In October, she was dry-docked at the Boston Naval Shipyard for an overhaul that lasted for three months. The ship left Boston in January 1949, bound for Guantanamo, where she carried out refresher training. She took part in routine operations with the Atlantic Fleet for the rest of the year, and on 6 December, she was again placed in reserve, this time at Philadelphia.

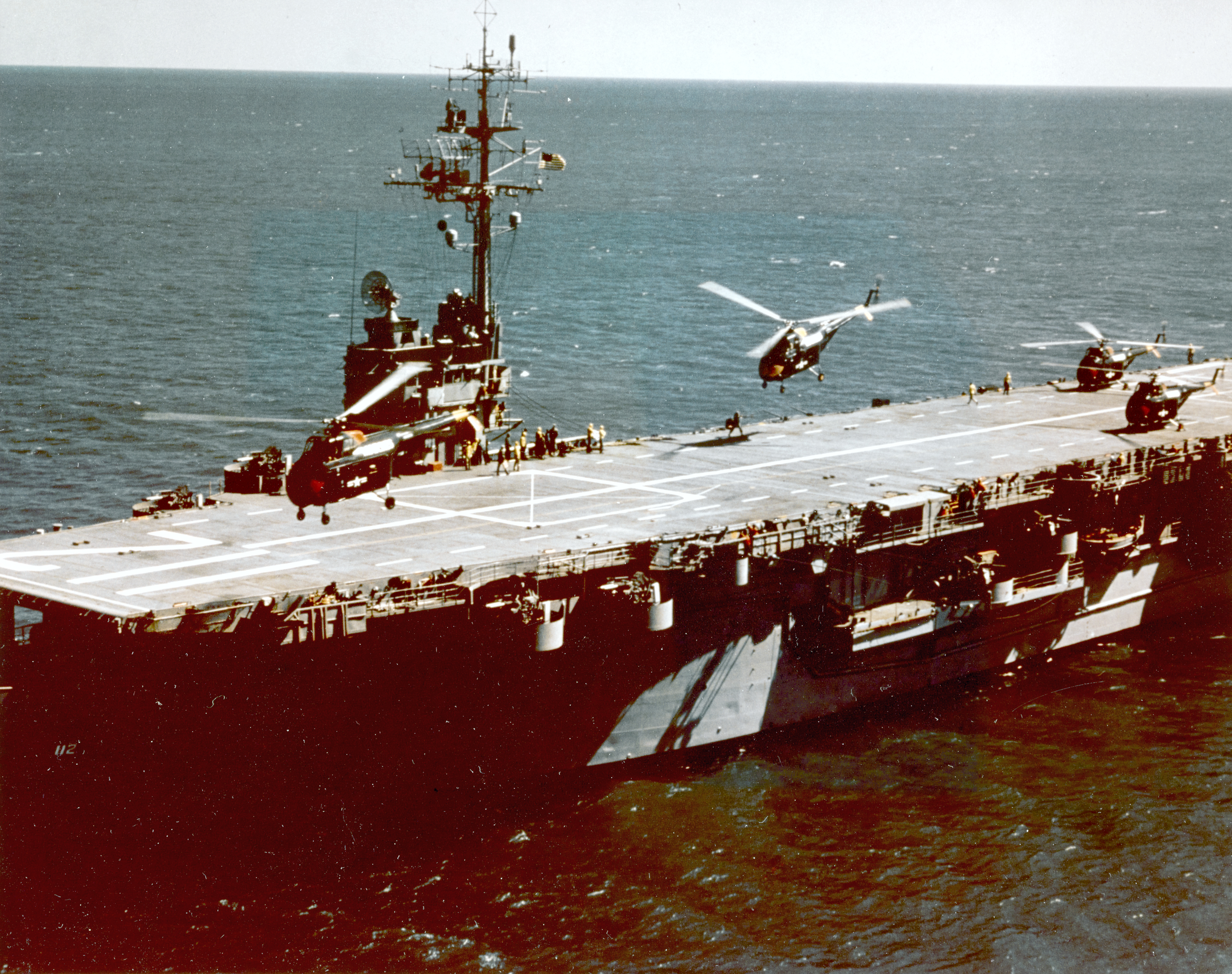
Siboney operating Marine HRS helicopters in the mid-1950s

Following the start of the Korean War in June 1950, Siboney was reactivated on 22 November, as the US Navy needed to transfer active ships to the war zone. Siboney remained in the Atlantic Fleet during this period, and first went to sea on 2 February 1951. Again based out of Norfolk, she sailed south to Guantanamo for extensive training maneuvers that lasted from 27 February to 10 April. She then returned north, and in July, she cruised off Canada. She made another voyage into the Mediterranean from September to 14 November, in company with warships from other North Atlantic Treaty Organization fleets. In January 1952, she conducted tests and carrier qualifications with A-1 Skyraiders and F4U Corsairs. She also carried out a pair of tests with Marine helicopter units during this period to evaluate their "vertical assault" concept, which envisioned using helicopter-borne assaults in conjunction with an amphibious invasion.

Later that year, Siboney was docked at the Norfolk Naval Shipyard for modernization; she returned to active service with the fleet on 20 January 1952. She took part in training operations in the Caribbean Sea and then formed the core of an anti-submarine hunter-killer group that operated together until August. On 16 September, she embarked on another cruise in the Mediterranean with elements of Sixth Fleet, which lasted until 1 December. Siboney passed the following two years participating in routine fleet training exercises that ranged from the coast of New England to the Caribbean. During this period, she also made training cruises to Spain with midshipmen from the US Naval Academy in the summer months. She underwent an overhaul at the Philadelphia Naval Shipyard from 28 September 1954 to 22 January 1955. On 4 October, she embarked supplies as part of a response to a severe hurricane that had struck Tampico, Mexico. She used her helicopters to ferry supplies to the city and surrounding area until 19 October.

Siboney resumed operations with the Atlantic Fleet in January 1956. Normal patrol and training duties followed through most of May, until the 26th, when she departed for another Mediterranean cruise with Sixth Fleet. The voyage lasted until 6 July; after a brief period at Norfolk, she sailed north to Philadelphia on 27 July, where she was decommissioned and placed in reserve four days later. By this time, the Navy had begun replacing the Commencement Bay-class ships with much larger Essex-class aircraft carriers, since the former were too small to operate newer and more effective anti-submarine patrol planes. Proposals to radically rebuild the Commencement Bays either with an angled flight deck and various structural improvements or lengthen their hulls by 30 ft (9.1 m) and replace their propulsion machinery to increase speed came to nothing, as they were deemed to be too expensive. Siboney was allocated to the Atlantic Reserve Fleet, where she remained for more than a decade. She was struck from the Naval Vessel Register on 1 June 1970 before being sold to the Union Minerals and Alloys Corporation in 1971. She was then broken up for scrap metal.
