= USS Rabaul =

Commencement Bay-class escort carrier of the US Navy

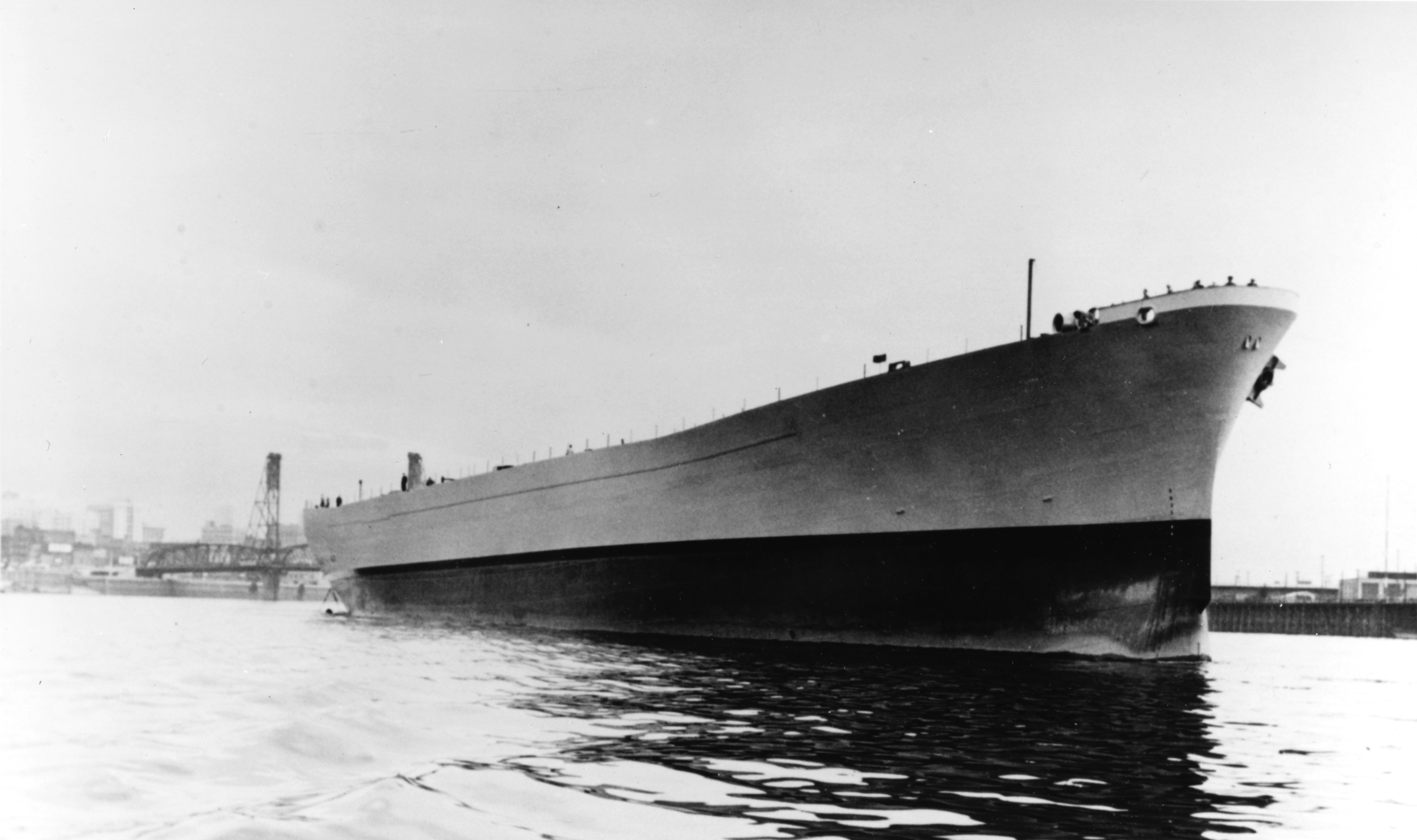
- USS Rabaul after her launch, 14 July 1945

History

United States
- Name: USS Rabaul
- Builder: Todd Pacific Shipyards
- Laid down: 29 January 1945
- Launched: 14 June 1945
- Acquired: 30 August 1946
- Stricken: 1 September 1971
- Fate: Sold for scrapping, 25 August 1972

General characteristics
- Class & type: Commencement Bay-class escort carrier
- Displacement: 21,397 long tons (21,740 t)
- Length: 557 ft 1 in (169.80 m) loa
- Beam: 75 ft (23 m)
- Draft: 32 ft (9.8 m)
- Installed power: 16,000 shp (12,000 kW); 4 × boilers
- Propulsion: 2 × Steam turbines; 2 × screw propellers
- Speed: 19 knots (35 km/h; 22 mph)
- Complement: 1,066
- Armament: 2 × 5 in (127 mm) dual-purpose guns; 36 × 40 mm (1.6 in) Bofors AA guns; 20 × 20 mm (0.8 in) Oerlikon AA guns
- Aircraft carried: 33
- Aviation facilities: 2 × aircraft catapults

USS Rabaul was a Commencement Bay-class escort carrier of the United States Navy. The Commencement Bay class were built during World War II, and were an improvement over the earlier Sangamon class, which were converted from oil tankers. They were capable of carrying an air group of 33 planes and were armed with an anti-aircraft battery of 5 in (127 mm), 40 mm (1.6 in), and 20 mm (0.8 in) guns. The ships were capable of a top speed of 19 knots (35 km/h; 22 mph), and due to their origin as tankers, had extensive fuel storage. She was delivered on 30 August 1946, but never commissioned. After spending 26 years in reserve, she was scrapped in 1973.

== Design ==
In 1941, as United States participation in World War II became increasingly likely, the US Navy embarked on a construction program for escort carriers, which were converted from transport ships of various types. Many of the escort carrier types were converted from C3-type transports, but the Sangamon-class escort carriers were instead rebuilt oil tankers. These proved to be very successful ships, and the Commencement Bay class, authorized for Fiscal Year 1944, were an improved version of the Sangamon design. The new ships were faster, had improved aviation facilities, and had better internal compartmentation. They proved to be the most successful of the escort carriers, and the only class to be retained in active service after the war, since they were large enough to operate newer aircraft.

Rabaul was 557 ft 1 in (169.80 m) long overall, with a beam of 75 ft (23 m) at the waterline, which extended to 105 ft 2 in (32.05 m) at maximum. She displaced 21,397 long tons (21,740 t) at full load, of which 12,876 long tons (13,083 t) could be fuel oil (though some of her storage tanks were converted to permanently store seawater for ballast), and at full load she had a draft of 27 ft 11 in (8.51 m). The ship's superstructure consisted of a small island. She had a complement of 1,066 officers and enlisted men.

The ship was powered by two Allis-Chalmers geared steam turbines, each driving one screw propeller, using steam provided by four Combustion Engineering-manufactured water-tube boilers. The propulsion system was rated to produce a total of 16,000 shp (12,000 kW) for a top speed of 19 knots (35 km/h; 22 mph). Given the very large storage capacity for oil, the ships of the Commencement Bay class could steam for some 23,900 nautical miles (44,300 km; 27,500 mi) at a speed of 15 knots (28 km/h; 17 mph).

Her defensive anti-aircraft armament consisted of two 5 in (127 mm) dual-purpose guns in single mounts, thirty-six 40 mm (2 in) Bofors guns, and twenty 20 mm (1 in) Oerlikon light AA cannons. The Bofors guns were placed in three quadruple and twelve twin mounts, while the Oerlikon guns were all mounted individually. She carried 33 planes, which could be launched from two aircraft catapults. Two elevators transferred aircraft from the hangar to the flight deck.

== History ==
The first fifteen ships of the Commencement Bay class were ordered on 23 January 1943, allocated to Fiscal Year 1944. The keel for Rabaul was laid down at the Todd Pacific Shipyards in Tacoma, Washington on 29 January 1945. She was named for the island of Rabaul in New Georgia, a major Japanese base during World War II, which was neutralized during a lengthy campaign in 1943 and 1944. The ship was launched on 14 June, and was delivered to the US Navy on 30 August, shortly after the end of the war.

The ship was not commissioned, and was instead assigned to the Pacific Reserve Fleet, based in Tacoma. Ten of the Commencement Bay-class ships saw significant service postwar as anti-submarine warfare (ASW) carriers, but they were small and had difficulty operating the new Grumman AF Guardian patrol planes, so the rest of the class remained laid up, and they were soon replaced in the ASW role by much larger Essex-class aircraft carriers. She was reclassified as a helicopter escort carrier, with the hull number CVHE-121, in June 1955. Three years later, in June 1958, she was moved to the San Diego Group of the Pacific Reserve Fleet.

In May 1959, Rabaul was reclassified as an aircraft ferry, with the hull number AKV-121. In the mid-1960s, the US Army explored the concept of a Floating Aircraft Maintenance Facility (FAMF), and in September 1967, the Department of Defense selected Rabaul to be converted for FAMF II, but the project ultimately came to nothing. She remained part of the reserve fleet until she was struck from the Naval Vessel Register on 1 September 1971. The ship was eventually sold for scrap on 25 August 1972 to the Nicholai Joffe Corporation, based in Beverly Hills, California. Shortly before scrapping, she was used in the closing scenes of the 1973 movie Magnum Force.
