= USS Vella Gulf (CVE-111) =

Commencement Bay-class escort carrier of the US Navy

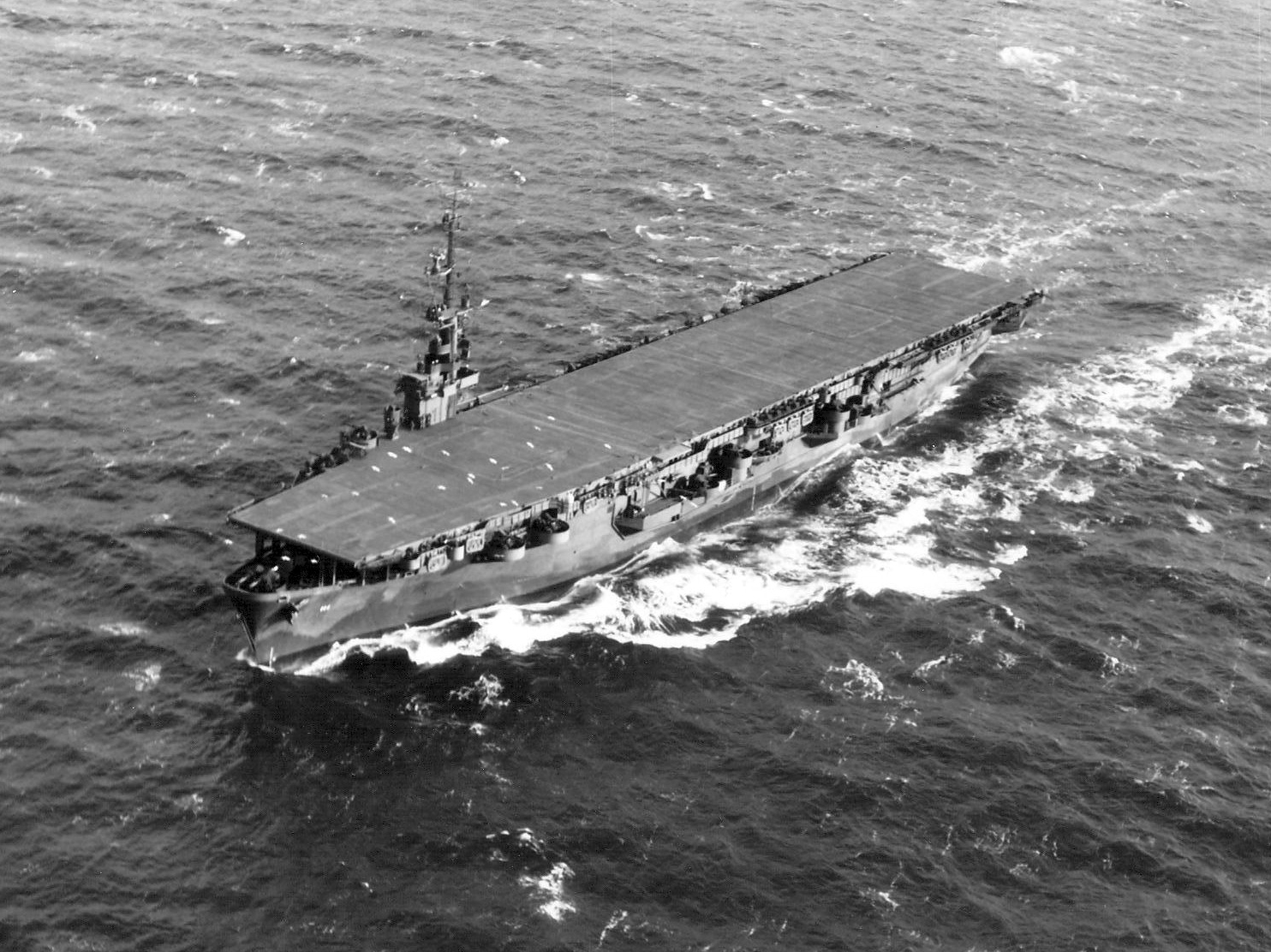
- USS Vella Gulf on 25 August 1945

History

United States
- Name: USS Vella Gulf
- Namesake: Battle of Vella Gulf
- Builder: Todd Pacific Shipyards
- Laid down: 7 March 1944
- Launched: 19 October 1944
- Commissioned: 9 April 1945
- Decommissioned: 9 August 1946
- Reclassified: Helicopter carrier, CVHE-111, 12 June 1955; Cargo ship and aircraft ferry, T-AKV-111
- Stricken: 1 June 1960
- Recommissioned: 1 November 1960
- Stricken: 1 December 1970
- Fate: Sold for scrap 22 October 1971

General characteristics
- Class & type: Commencement Bay-class escort carrier
- Displacement: 21,397 long tons (21,740 t)
- Length: 557 ft 1 in (169.80 m) loa
- Beam: 75 ft (23 m)
- Draft: 32 ft (9.8 m)
- Installed power: 16,000 shp (12,000 kW); 4 × boilers
- Propulsion: 2 × Steam turbines; 2 × screw propellers
- Speed: 19 knots (35 km/h; 22 mph)
- Complement: 1,066
- Armament: 2 × 5 in (127 mm) dual-purpose guns; 36 × 40 mm (1.6 in) Bofors AA guns; 20 × 20 mm (0.8 in) Oerlikon AA guns
- Aircraft carried: 33
- Aviation facilities: 2 × aircraft catapults

USS Vella Gulf was a Commencement Bay-class escort carrier of the United States Navy, originally named Totem Bay. The Commencement Bay class were built during World War II, and were an improvement over the earlier Sangamon class, which were converted from oil tankers. They were capable of carrying an air group of 33 planes and were armed with an anti-aircraft battery of 5 in (127 mm), 40 mm (1.6 in), and 20 mm (0.8 in) guns. The ships were capable of a top speed of 19 knots (35 km/h; 22 mph), and due to their origin as tankers, had extensive fuel storage.

== Design ==
In 1941, as United States participation in World War II became increasingly likely, the US Navy embarked on a construction program for escort carriers, which were converted from transport ships of various types. Many of the escort carrier types were converted from C3-type transports, but the Sangamon-class escort carriers were instead rebuilt oil tankers. These proved to be very successful ships, and the Commencement Bay class, authorized for Fiscal Year 1944, were an improved version of the Sangamon design. The new ships were faster, had improved aviation facilities, and had better internal compartmentation. They proved to be the most successful of the escort carriers, and the only class to be retained in active service after the war, since they were large enough to operate newer aircraft.

Vella Gulf was 557 ft 1 in (169.80 m) long overall, with a beam of 75 ft (23 m) at the waterline, which extended to 105 ft 2 in (32.05 m) at maximum. She displaced 21,397 long tons (21,740 t) at full load, of which 12,876 long tons (13,083 t) could be fuel oil (though some of her storage tanks were converted to permanently store seawater for ballast), and at full load she had a draft of 27 ft 11 in (8.51 m). The ship's superstructure consisted of a small island. She had a complement of 1,066 officers and enlisted men.

The ship was powered by two Allis-Chalmers geared steam turbines, each driving one screw propeller, using steam provided by four Combustion Engineering-manufactured water-tube boilers. The propulsion system was rated to produce a total of 16,000 shp (12,000 kW) for a top speed of 19 knots (35 km/h; 22 mph). Given the very large storage capacity for oil, the ships of the Commencement Bay class could steam for some 23,900 nautical miles (44,300 km; 27,500 mi) at a speed of 15 knots (28 km/h; 17 mph).

Her defensive anti-aircraft armament consisted of two 5 in (127 mm) dual-purpose guns in single mounts, thirty-six 40 mm (2 in) Bofors guns, and twenty 20 mm (1 in) Oerlikon light AA cannons. The Bofors guns were placed in three quadruple and twelve twin mounts, while the Oerlikon guns were all mounted individually. She carried 33 planes, which could be launched from two aircraft catapults. Two elevators transferred aircraft from the hangar to the flight deck.

== Service history ==
=== Construction and World War II ===
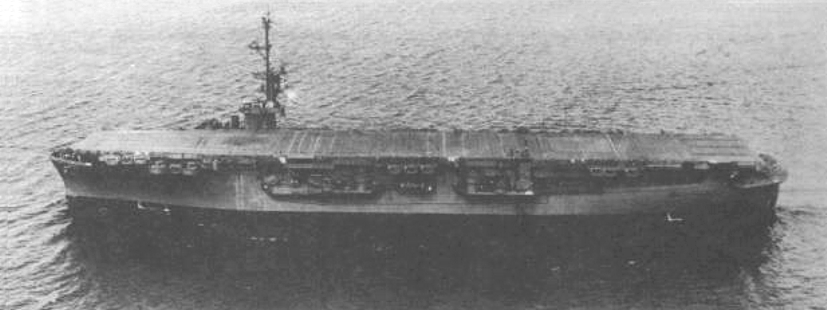
Vella Gulf in April 1945, shortly after commissioning

The first fifteen ships of the Commencement Bay class were ordered on 23 January 1943, allocated to Fiscal Year 1944. The carrier Totem Bay was among these ships, and she was laid down at the Todd-Pacific Shipyards at Tacoma, Washington, on 7 February 1944. On 26 April, she was renamed Vella Gulf, after the Battle of Vella Gulf, which had been fought between American and Japanese destroyer flotillas during the Solomons campaign the previous year. The ship was launched on 19 October 1944, and was commissioned into the fleet on 9 April 1945. The ship began sea trials in Puget Sound, and then departed for San Diego, California. She arrived there on 4 May and took on part of her Marine Corps air group to begin initial training and a shakedown cruise off the southern coast of California. Over the course of this period, she embarked the rest of her air complement.

Vella Gulf was docked for minor repairs and then left California on 17 June, stopping in Pearl Harbor, Hawaii, eight days later. She remained there for eleven days of combat training to prepare her crew and pilots for wartime operations. She got underway again on 9 July, bound for the Mariana Islands. She stopped at Eniwetok in the Marshall Islands on 16 July on the way to refuel, and anchored in Guam on 20 July. Three days later, she sortied to conduct her first air strikes of the conflict, against Japanese positions on nearby Rota and Pagan Islands. The ship's fighters—Vought F4U Corsairs and Grumman F6F Hellcats—and Grumman TBM Avenger bombers carried out a total of twenty-four sorties against Pagan on 24 July. A further twenty-one sorties struck Rota three days later. Japanese aircraft fire proved ineffective in both series of attacks, and all of her aircraft returned without serious damage.

The next day, Vella Gulf transferred her aircraft to the air base at Saipan before returning to Guam on 2 August, anchoring in Apra Harbor for three days of rest and replenishment. On 5 August, she departed for Okinawa to join the Japan campaign, arriving in Buckner Bay, Okinawa, on the 9th. That evening, word spread that Japan had entered surrender negotiations, prompting many of the ships and ground troops ashore to launch pyrotechnics in celebration. Vella Gulf then returned to Guam, arriving there on 15 August, the day that Japan announced it would surrender. She soon returned north to participate in the initial occupation of Japan, providing logistical support to other Allied vessels. In late August, she and her sister ship Gilbert Islands provided air cover for one of the fleet replenishment groups. Vella Gulf entered Tokyo Bay on 10 September. She was awarded one battle star for her short wartime service.

=== Postwar and fate ===
On 21 September, Vella Gulf sailed south to Okinawa, where she embarked some 650 men to bring them back to the United States. She stopped in Pearl Harbor on the way, and then proceeded on to San Francisco, California, arriving on 14 October. Vella Gulf was thereafter used as a training ship in Puget Sound for escort carrier crews for the next five months. In late March 1946, she moved to San Diego, arriving on the 27th. She remained there only briefly, however, before being ordered to return to Tacoma. After arriving on 30 March, she was docked to begin preparing the ship to be mothballed in the reserve fleet. On 7 April, she was moved to Seattle, Washington; on 9 August, she was formally decommissioned and placed in reserve as part of the Pacific Reserve Fleet there. The ship was then moved to Tacoma, where she remained for several years. Ten of the Commencement Bay-class ships saw significant service postwar as anti-submarine warfare (ASW) carriers, but they were small and had difficulty operating the new Grumman AF Guardian patrol planes, so the rest of the class remained laid up, and they were soon replaced in the ASW role by much larger Essex-class aircraft carriers.

On 12 June 1955, she was reclassified as a helicopter carrier with the hull number CVHE-111, but she remained out of service. She was later given to the Military Sea Transportation Service, eventually being assigned the hull number T-AKV-11. She saw no further active service, however, and she was eventually struck from the Naval Vessel Register on 1 June 1960. Instead of being immediately discarded for scrap, she was reinstated to the register on 1 November, and remained in the Navy's inventory for another decade. On 1 December 1970, she was struck a second time, and this time was sold to American Ship Dismantlers, Inc., of Portland, Oregon on 22 October 1971. She was thereafter broken up for scrap.
