= USS Kula Gulf =

Commencement Bay-class escort carrier of the US Navy

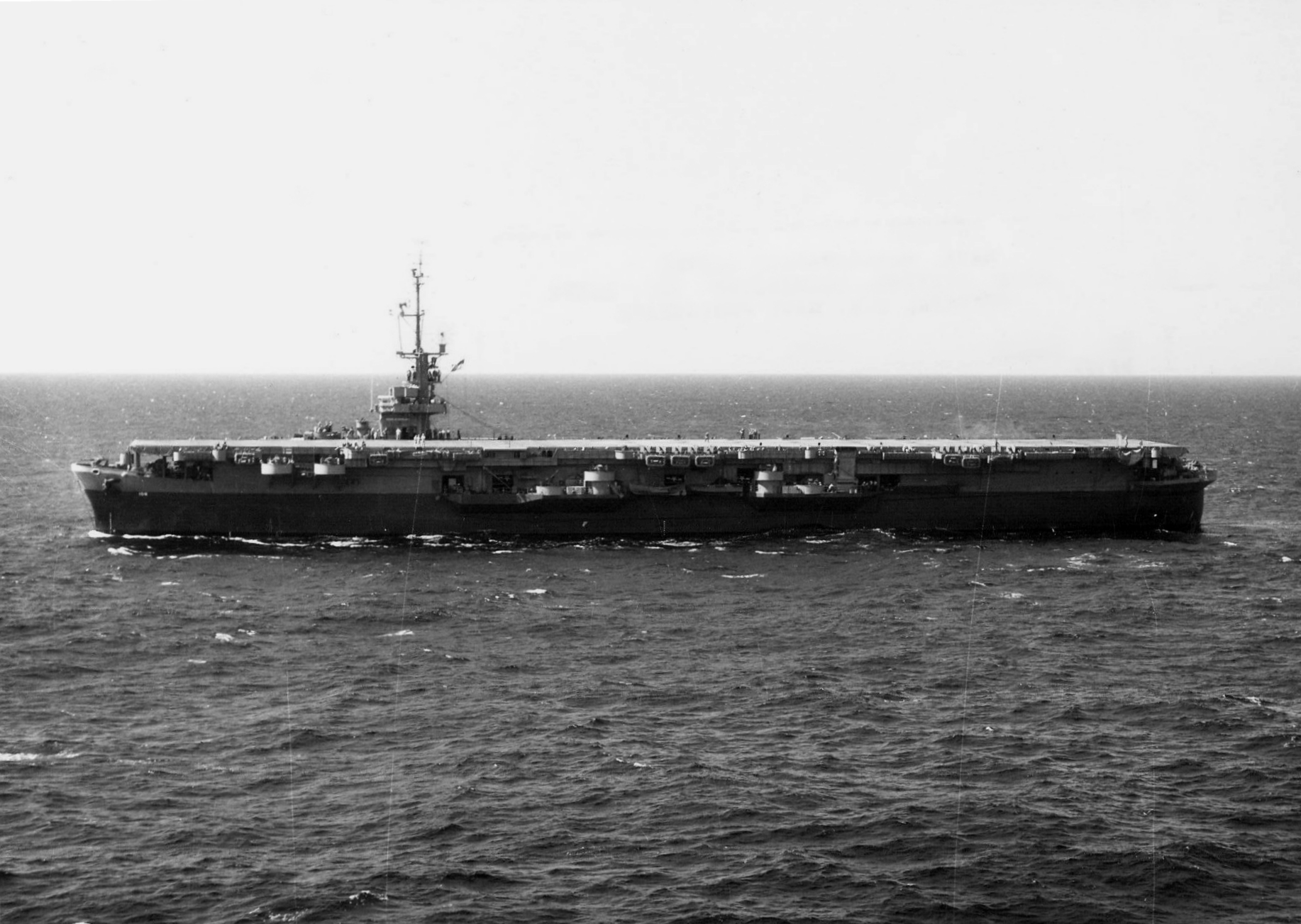
- USS Kula Gulf on 5 September 1945

History

United States
- Name: USS Kula Gulf
- Namesake: Battle of Kula Gulf
- Builder: Todd-Pacific Shipyards
- Laid down: 16 December 1943
- Launched: 15 August 1944
- Commissioned: 12 May 1945
- Decommissioned: 6 October 1969
- Stricken: 15 September 1970
- Fate: Scrapped in 1971

General characteristics
- Class & type: Commencement Bay-class escort carrier
- Displacement: 21,397 long tons (21,740 t)
- Length: 557 ft 1 in (169.80 m) loa
- Beam: 75 ft (23 m)
- Draft: 32 ft (9.8 m)
- Installed power: 16,000 shp (12,000 kW); 4 × boilers
- Propulsion: 2 × Steam turbines; 2 × screw propellers
- Speed: 19 knots (35 km/h; 22 mph)
- Complement: 1,066
- Armament: 2 × 5 in (127 mm) dual-purpose guns; 36 × 40 mm (1.6 in) Bofors AA guns; 20 × 20 mm (0.8 in) Oerlikon AA guns
- Aircraft carried: 33
- Aviation facilities: 2 × aircraft catapults

USS Kula Gulf was a Commencement Bay-class escort carrier of the United States Navy. She was originally named Vermillion Bay, but was renamed during construction. The Commencement Bay class were built during World War II, and were an improvement over the earlier Sangamon class, which were converted from oil tankers. They were capable of carrying an air group of 33 planes and were armed with an anti-aircraft battery of 5 in (127 mm), 40 mm (1.6 in), and 20 mm (0.8 in) guns. The ships were capable of a top speed of 19 knots (35 km/h; 22 mph), and due to their origin as tankers, had extensive fuel storage.

== Design ==
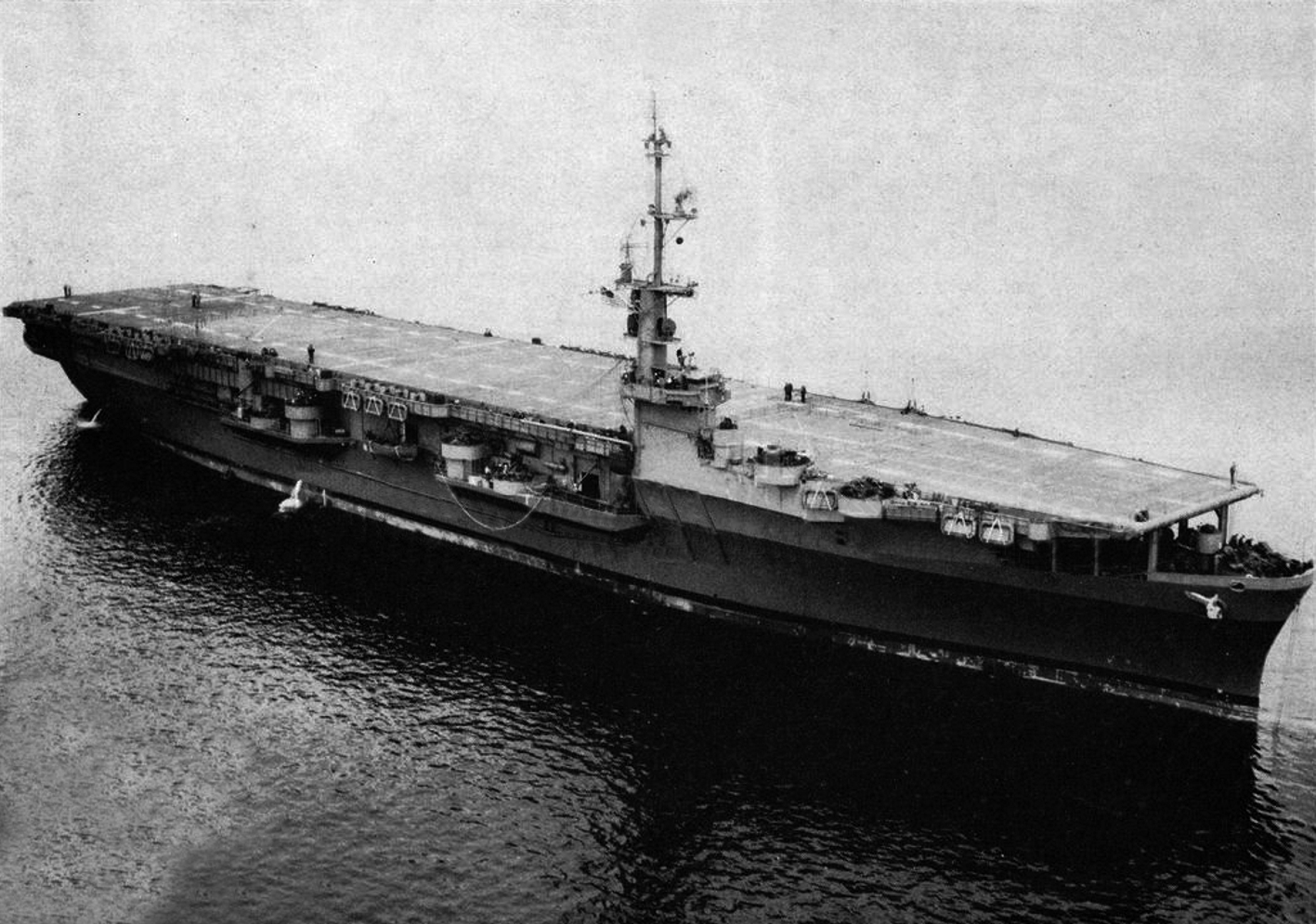
Kula Gulf shortly after entering service in 1945

In 1941, as United States participation in World War II became increasingly likely, the US Navy embarked on a construction program for escort carriers, which were converted from transport ships of various types. Many of the escort carrier types were converted from C3-type transports, but the Sangamon-class escort carriers were instead rebuilt oil tankers. These proved to be very successful ships, and the Commencement Bay class, authorized for Fiscal Year 1944, were an improved version of the Sangamon design. The new ships were faster, had improved aviation facilities, and had better internal compartmentation. They proved to be the most successful of the escort carriers, and the only class to be retained in active service after the war, since they were large enough to operate newer aircraft.

Kula Gulf was 557 ft 1 in (169.80 m) long overall, with a beam of 75 ft (23 m) at the waterline, which extended to 105 ft 2 in (32.05 m) at maximum. She displaced 21,397 long tons (21,740 t) at full load, of which 12,876 long tons (13,083 t) could be fuel oil (though some of her storage tanks were converted to permanently store seawater for ballast), and at full load she had a draft of 27 ft 11 in (8.51 m). The ship's superstructure consisted of a small island. She had a complement of 1,066 officers and enlisted men.

The ship was powered by two Allis-Chalmers geared steam turbines, each driving one screw propeller, using steam provided by four Combustion Engineering-manufactured water-tube boilers. The propulsion system was rated to produce a total of 16,000 shp (12,000 kW) for a top speed of 19 knots (35 km/h; 22 mph). Given the very large storage capacity for oil, the ships of the Commencement Bay class could steam for some 23,900 nautical miles (44,300 km; 27,500 mi) at a speed of 15 knots (28 km/h; 17 mph).

Her defensive anti-aircraft armament consisted of two 5 in (127 mm) dual-purpose guns in single mounts, thirty-six 40 mm (2 in) Bofors guns, and twenty 20 mm (1 in) Oerlikon light AA cannons. The Bofors guns were placed in three quadruple and twelve twin mounts, while the Oerlikon guns were all mounted individually. She carried 33 planes, which could be launched from two aircraft catapults. Two elevators transferred aircraft from the hangar to the flight deck.

== Service history ==
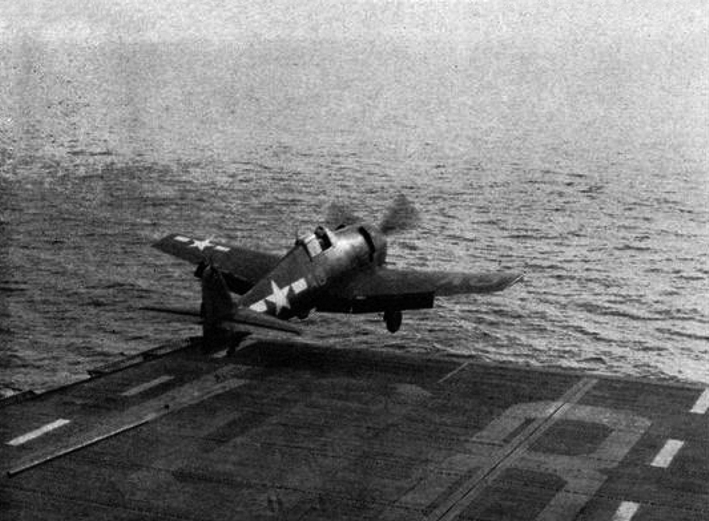
A Grumman F6F Hellcat taking off from Kula Gulf in 1945

=== World War II ===
The first fifteen ships of the Commencement Bay class were ordered on 23 January 1943, allocated to Fiscal Year 1944. Originally named Vermillion Bay, the ship assigned hull number CVE-108 was renamed Kula Gulf after the Battle of Kula Gulf on 6 November 1943, before work at the Todd-Pacific Shipyards began. Her keel was laid down on 16 December, and she was launched on 15 August 1944. She was then moved to Portland, Oregon, where she was completed by the Williamette Iron & Steel Corporation. The ship was commissioned on 12 May 1945. She then went on a shakedown cruise and completed training exercises, including for night carrier operations, off the West Coast of the United States. She finally got underway to join the American fleet fighting in the western Pacific on 5 August.

Kula Gulf passed through Pearl Harbor, Hawaii, and the Marshall Islands before arriving in Leyte Gulf in the Philippines on 14 September, nearly two weeks after Japan surrendered, formally ending World War II. The ship spent the next two months patrolling in the East China Sea, based in Okinawa. She also transported planes between Saipan and Guam in the Mariana Islands during this period. She thereafter joined Operation Magic Carpet, the effort to repatriate American service members after the war. She embarked some 600 men at Guam and left on 17 November, bound for San Francisco. She arrived there on 4 December and disembarked her passengers. She made a second cruise to East Asia on 10 December, arriving in China on 10 January 1946; she picked up some 1,520 men at Tientsin and Qingdao and brought them back to San Diego, California, arriving on 26 January.

=== Atlantic Fleet operations ===
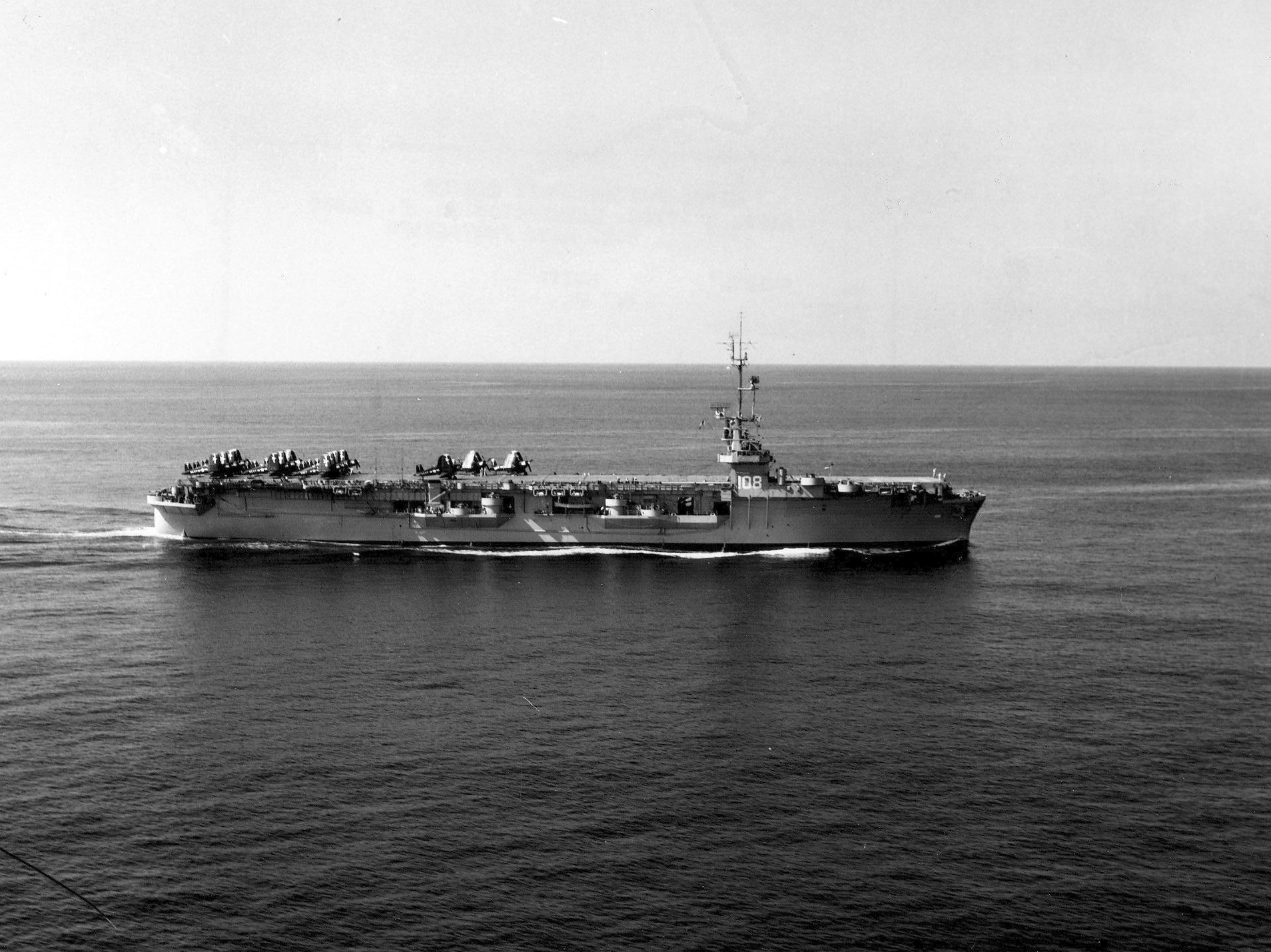
Kula Gulf underway in 1951

On 26 February, Kula Gulf left San Francisco with orders to move to the East Coast of the United States. She transited the Panama Canal and sailed to Norfolk, Virginia, arriving on 16 March. There, she was decommissioned on 3 July and assigned to the Atlantic Reserve Fleet. She remained out of service for the next four five years. She was recommissioned on 15 February 1951 to serve as a training ship, as the outbreak of the Korean War had drastically increased the need for trained pilots. She conducted a shakedown cruise south to Guantanamo Bay, Cuba, before sailing from Norfolk on 6 August with a load of aircraft to be transferred to Casablanca in French Morocco. She arrived back in Norfolk on 1 September, and she thereafter began her role as a training carrier. She served in this capacity for the following fifteen months, training pilots for fighters, anti-submarine patrol aircraft, and helicopters.

Kula Gulf took part in Marine Corps helicopter training exercises held at Vieques Island, Puerto Rico in May 1952. In October, she served as part of the anti-submarine screen for a group of troop ships sailing to Newfoundland and Labrador in Canada. After returning to the United States, she underwent a modernization that began in January 1953 and lasted until July. She thereafter returned to anti-submarine training exercises off the East Coast of the United States and in the Caribbean Sea. These maneuvers continued for the following two years, during which time Kula Gulf helped to develop anti-submarine tactics to counter the threat of Soviet submarines. She also participated in training exercises used to test helicopter assault tactics being developed by the Marine Corps. She took part in a major exercise to test the so-called "vertical assault" doctrine at Vieques Island that lasted from February to April 1955. The doctrine envisioned using escort carriers to launch helicopters carrying marines and heavy equipment to seize strategic crossroads inland from the invasion beach, while traditional amphibious forces went ashore.

On 26 April, Kula Gulf arrived back in Norfolk. She sailed north to the Boston Naval Shipyard on 13 May, and then moved to the Philadelphia Naval Shipyard for a pre-inactivation overhaul on 19 August. She was decommissioned on 15 December at Philadelphia, and returned to the Atlantic Reserve Fleet. By this time, the Navy had begun replacing the Commencement Bay-class ships with much larger Essex-class aircraft carriers, since the former were too small to operate newer and more effective anti-submarine patrol planes. Proposals to radically rebuild the Commencement Bays either with an angled flight deck and various structural improvements or lengthen their hulls by 30 ft (9.1 m) and replace their propulsion machinery to increase speed came to nothing, as they were deemed to be too expensive. While out of service, she was reclassified with the hull number AKV-8 on 7 May 1959.

=== Vietnam War ===
In the early 1960s, the United States began to be increasingly involved in South Vietnam, providing military assistance to defend it against attacks by communist North Vietnam as part of the US's broader policy of containment. Due to the increased logistical demands on the US Navy, Kula Gulf was transferred to the Military Sea Transportation Service on 30 June 1965 to be used as an aircraft transport. She assisted in the transport of the 1st Cavalry Division and its helicopters shortly thereafter, departing from the East Coast and taking them to South Vietnam. She thereafter transitioned to the West Coast of the United States, continuing to ferry men and equipment between the US and South Vietnam. She served in that role through 1969, and was eventually struck from the Naval Vessel Register on 15 September 1970. Kula Gulf was broken up the following year.
