= USS Cape Gloucester =

Commencement Bay-class escort carrier of the US Navy

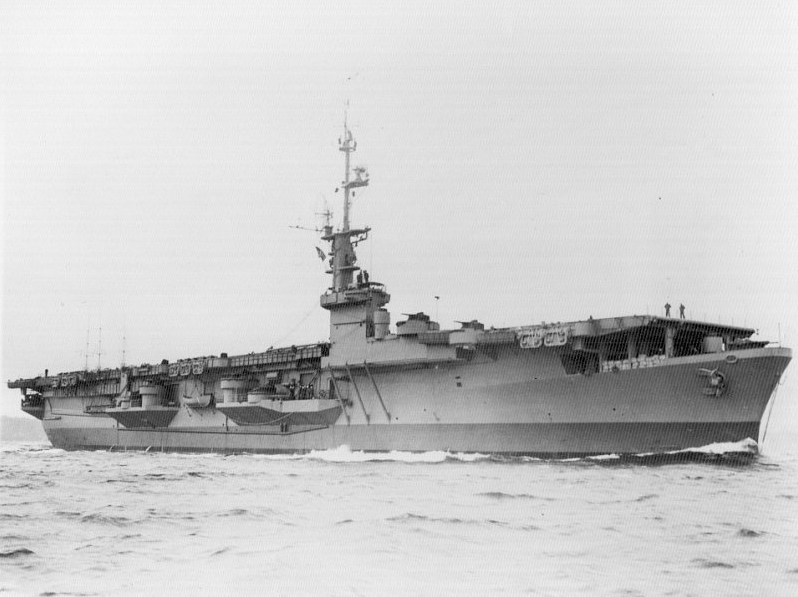
- USS Cape Gloucester in 1945

History

United States
- Name: USS Cape Gloucester
- Namesake: Battle of Cape Gloucester
- Builder: Todd Pacific Shipyards
- Laid down: 10 January 1944
- Launched: 12 September 1944
- Commissioned: 5 March 1945
- Decommissioned: 5 November 1946
- Stricken: 1 April 1971
- Fate: Scrapped, 1971

General characteristics
- Class & type: Commencement Bay-class escort carrier
- Displacement: 21,397 long tons (21,740 t)
- Length: 557 ft 1 in (169.80 m) loa
- Beam: 75 ft (23 m)
- Draft: 32 ft (9.8 m)
- Installed power: 16,000 shp (12,000 kW); 4 × boilers
- Propulsion: 2 × Steam turbines; 2 × screw propellers
- Speed: 19 knots (35 km/h; 22 mph)
- Complement: 1,066
- Armament: 2 × 5 in (127 mm) dual-purpose guns; 36 × 40 mm (1.6 in) Bofors AA guns; 20 × 20 mm (0.8 in) Oerlikon AA guns
- Aircraft carried: 33
- Aviation facilities: 2 × aircraft catapults

USS Cape Gloucester was a Commencement Bay-class escort carrier of the United States Navy, in service from 5 March 1945 to 5 November 1946. The Commencement Bay class were built during World War II, and were an improvement over the earlier Sangamon class, which were converted from oil tankers. They were capable of carrying an air group of 33 planes, and due to their origin as tankers and were armed with an anti-aircraft battery of 5 in (127 mm), 40 mm (1.6 in), and 20 mm (0.8 in) guns. The ships were capable of a top speed of 19 knots (35 km/h; 22 mph), had extensive fuel storage. After spending another 25 years in the reserve fleet, the ship was scrapped in 1971.

== Design ==
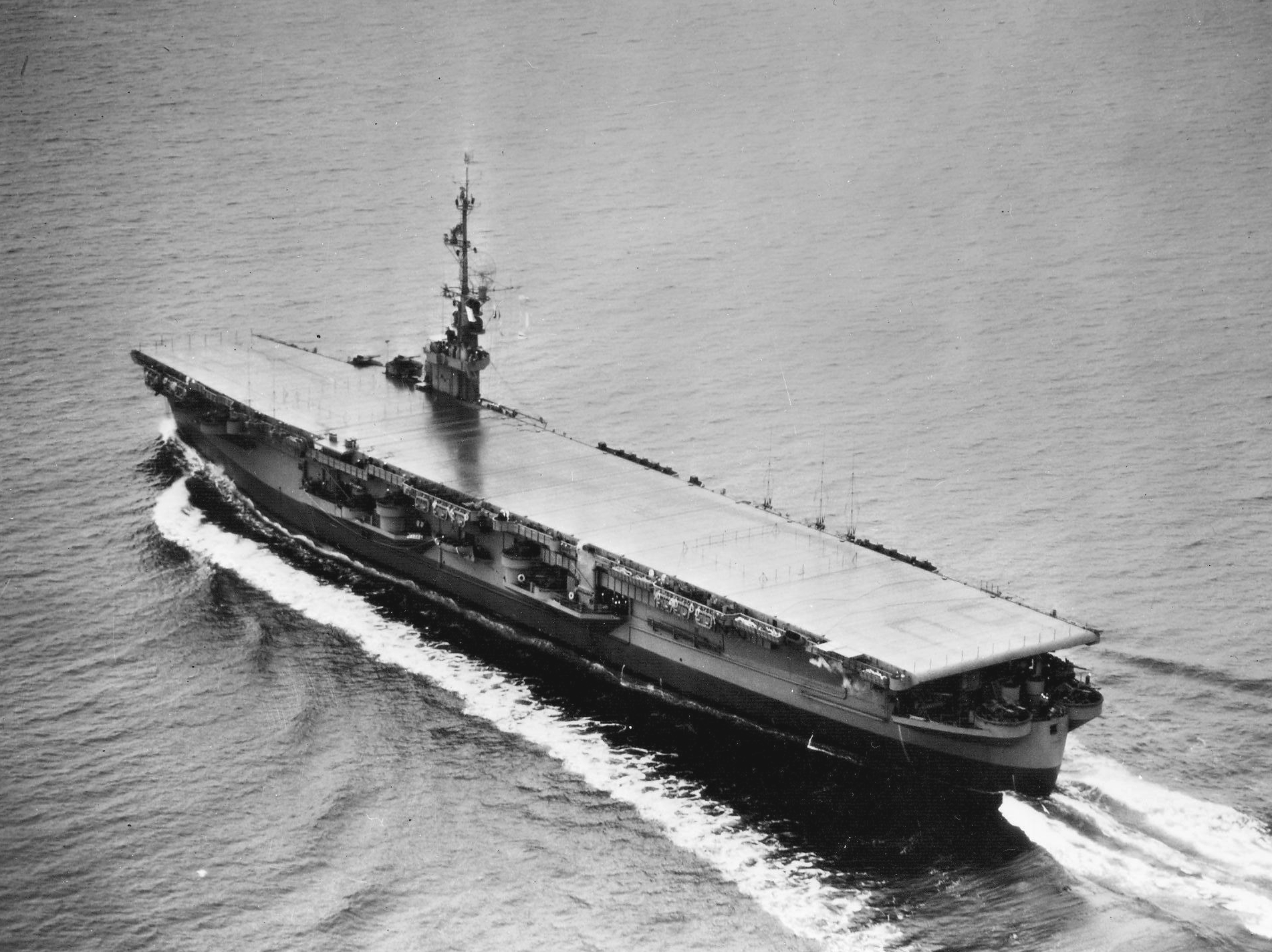
Cape Gloucester soon after completing in 1945

In 1941, as United States participation in World War II became increasingly likely, the US Navy embarked on a construction program for escort carriers, which were converted from transport ships of various types. Many of the escort carrier types were converted from C3-type transports, but the Sangamon-class escort carriers were instead rebuilt oil tankers. These proved to be very successful ships, and the Commencement Bay class, authorized for Fiscal Year 1944, were an improved version of the Sangamon design. The new ships were faster, had improved aviation facilities, and had better internal compartmentation. They proved to be the most successful of the escort carriers, and the only class to be retained in active service after the war, since they were large enough to operate newer aircraft.

Cape Gloucester was 557 ft 1 in (169.80 m) long overall, with a beam of 75 ft (23 m) at the waterline, which extended to 105 ft 2 in (32.05 m) at maximum. She displaced 21,397 long tons (21,740 t) at full load, of which 12,876 long tons (13,083 t) could be fuel oil (though some of her storage tanks were converted to permanently store seawater for ballast), and at full load she had a draft of 27 ft 11 in (8.51 m). The ship's superstructure consisted of a small island. She had a complement of 1,066 officers and enlisted men.

The ship was powered by two Allis-Chalmers geared steam turbines, each driving one screw propeller, using steam provided by four Combustion Engineering-manufactured water-tube boilers. The propulsion system was rated to produce a total of 16,000 shp (12,000 kW) for a top speed of 19 knots (35 km/h; 22 mph). Given the very large storage capacity for oil, the ships of the Commencement Bay class could steam for some 23,900 nautical miles (44,300 km; 27,500 mi) at a speed of 15 knots (28 km/h; 17 mph).

Her defensive anti-aircraft armament consisted of two 5 in (127 mm) dual-purpose guns in single mounts, thirty-six 40 mm (2 in) Bofors guns, and twenty 20 mm (1 in) Oerlikon light AA cannons. The Bofors guns were placed in three quadruple and twelve twin mounts; four of the Oerlikon guns were mounted individually, while the remaining guns were in experimental Mark 31 quadruple mounts. She carried 33 planes, which could be launched from two aircraft catapults. Two elevators transferred aircraft from the hangar to the flight deck.

== Service history ==
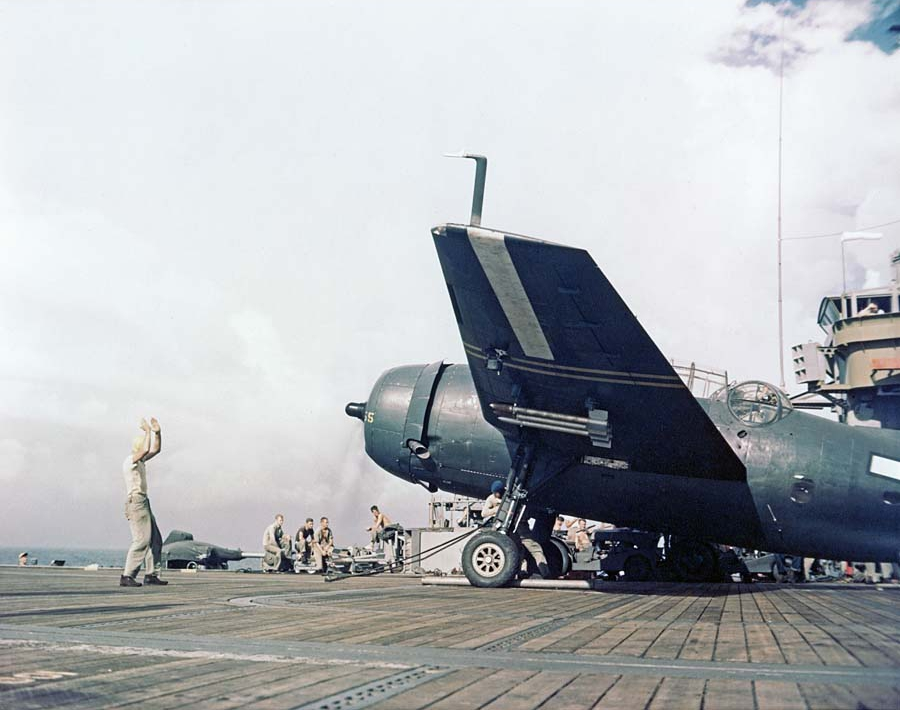
A TBM-3 Avenger aboard Cape Gloucester

The first fifteen ships of the Commencement Bay class were ordered on 23 January 1943, allocated to Fiscal Year 1944. The ship was laid down under the name Willapa Bay on 10 January 1944 at the Todd-Pacific Shipyards in Tacoma, Washington. She was renamed Cape Gloucester after the Battle of Cape Gloucester on 26 April and was launched on 12 September. The ship was commissioned on 5 March 1945. After initial working up, she moved to Pearl Harbor for combat training in preparation for her deployment to the front lines.

Cape Gloucester then sailed west to the Philippines, arriving at Leyte on 29 June. There, she joined the Third Fleet, which was operating off Okinawa during the Japan campaign. She contributed her fighter aircraft to the combat air patrol defending minesweepers clearing Japanese defensive minefields in the area from 5 to 17 July. She also used her aircraft to carry out photo-reconnaissance missions over the coast of Japanese-occupied China from late July to 7 August. Her planes shot down several Japanese aircraft during this period and assisted in damaging a cargo ship.

The ship then returned to the coast of Japan to cover minesweepers operating there following the Japanese decision to surrender. Following the end of the conflict, she helped to liberate Allied prisoners of war who had been imprisoned on Kyushu. Over the following months, she made four Operation Magic Carpet voyages between Japan and Pearl Harbor, returning American soldiers, sailors, and marines home. She received a single battle star for her short period of service during the war.

With her role in the repatriation effort over, Cape Gloucester sailed to Tacoma on 22 May 1946, where she was decommissioned and reduced to reserve status on 5 November. Ten of the Commencement Bay-class ships saw significant service postwar as anti-submarine warfare carriers, but they were small and had difficulty operating the new Grumman AF Guardian patrol planes, so the rest of the class remained laid up, and they were soon replaced by much larger Essex-class aircraft carriers. As part of the Pacific Reserve Fleet for more than a decade and a half, she was reclassified as a helicopter carrier with the hull number CVHE-109 on 12 June 1955. She was reclassified again on 7 May 1959 as a cargo ship and aircraft transport with the hull number AKV-9. She was struck from the Naval Vessel Register on 1 April 1971 and thereafter sold to be broken up for scrap.
