= USS Saidor =

Commencement Bay-class escort carrier of the US Navy

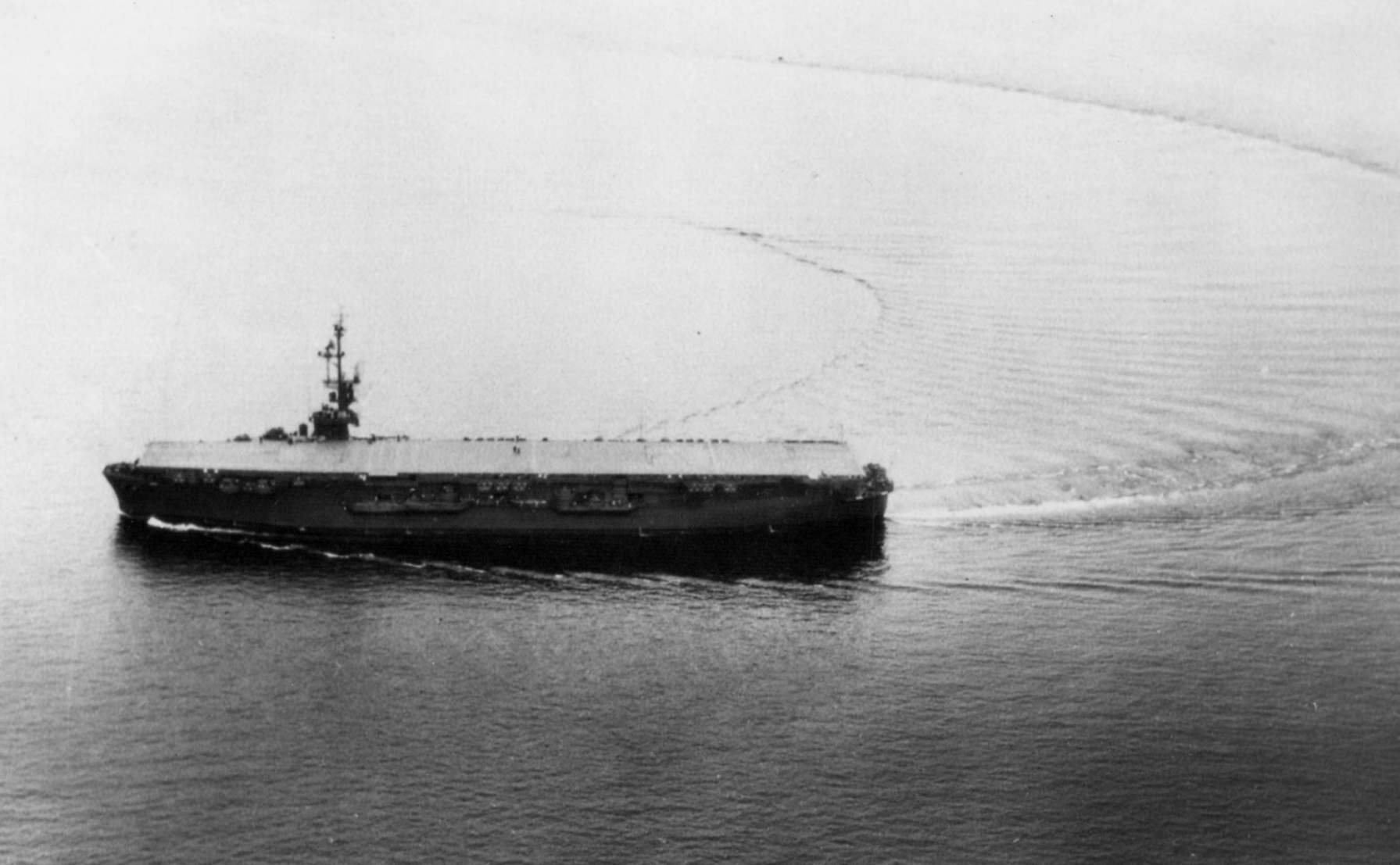
- USS Saidor (CVE-117) c. 1945

History

United States
- Name: USS Saidor
- Namesake: Landing at Saidor
- Builder: Todd Pacific Shipyards
- Laid down: 29 September 1944
- Launched: 17 March 1945
- Commissioned: 4 September 1945
- Decommissioned: 12 September 1947
- Stricken: 1 December 1970
- Fate: Sold 22 October 1971 and scrapped

General characteristics
- Class & type: Commencement Bay-class escort carrier
- Displacement: 21,397 long tons (21,740 t)
- Length: 557 ft 1 in (169.80 m) loa
- Beam: 75 ft (23 m)
- Draft: 32 ft (9.8 m)
- Installed power: 16,000 shp (12,000 kW); 4 × boilers
- Propulsion: 2 × Steam turbines; 2 × screw propellers
- Speed: 19 knots (35 km/h; 22 mph)
- Complement: 1,066
- Armament: 2 × 5 in (127 mm) dual-purpose guns; 36 × 40 mm (1.6 in) Bofors AA guns; 20 × 20 mm (0.8 in) Oerlikon AA guns
- Aircraft carried: 33
- Aviation facilities: 2 × aircraft catapults

USS Saidor was a Commencement Bay-class escort carrier of the United States Navy. The Commencement Bay class were built during World War II, and were an improvement over the earlier Sangamon class, which were converted from oil tankers. They were capable of carrying an air group of 33 planes and were armed with an anti-aircraft battery of 5 in (127 mm), 40 mm (1.6 in), and 20 mm (0.8 in) guns. The ships were capable of a top speed of 19 knots (35 km/h; 22 mph), and due to their origin as tankers, had extensive fuel storage.

== Design ==
In 1941, as United States participation in World War II became increasingly likely, the US Navy embarked on a construction program for escort carriers, which were converted from transport ships of various types. Many of the escort carrier types were converted from C3-type transports, but the Sangamon-class escort carriers were instead rebuilt oil tankers. These proved to be very successful ships, and the Commencement Bay class, authorized for Fiscal Year 1944, were an improved version of the Sangamon design. The new ships were faster, had improved aviation facilities, and had better internal compartmentation. They proved to be the most successful of the escort carriers, and the only class to be retained in active service after the war, since they were large enough to operate newer aircraft.

Saidor was 557 ft 1 in (169.80 m) long overall, with a beam of 75 ft (23 m) at the waterline, which extended to 105 ft 2 in (32.05 m) at maximum. She displaced 21,397 long tons (21,740 t) at full load, of which 12,876 long tons (13,083 t) could be fuel oil (though some of her storage tanks were converted to permanently store seawater for ballast), and at full load she had a draft of 27 ft 11 in (8.51 m). The ship's superstructure consisted of a small island. She had a complement of 1,066 officers and enlisted men.

The ship was powered by two Allis-Chalmers geared steam turbines, each driving one screw propeller, using steam provided by four Combustion Engineering-manufactured water-tube boilers. The propulsion system was rated to produce a total of 16,000 shp (12,000 kW) for a top speed of 19 knots (35 km/h; 22 mph). Given the very large storage capacity for oil, the ships of the Commencement Bay class could steam for some 23,900 nautical miles (44,300 km; 27,500 mi) at a speed of 15 knots (28 km/h; 17 mph).

Her defensive anti-aircraft armament consisted of two 5 in (127 mm) dual-purpose guns in single mounts, thirty-six 40 mm (2 in) Bofors guns, and twenty 20 mm (1 in) Oerlikon light AA cannons. The Bofors guns were placed in three quadruple and twelve twin mounts, while the Oerlikon guns were all mounted individually. She carried 33 planes, which could be launched from two aircraft catapults. Two elevators transferred aircraft from the hangar to the flight deck.

== Service history ==
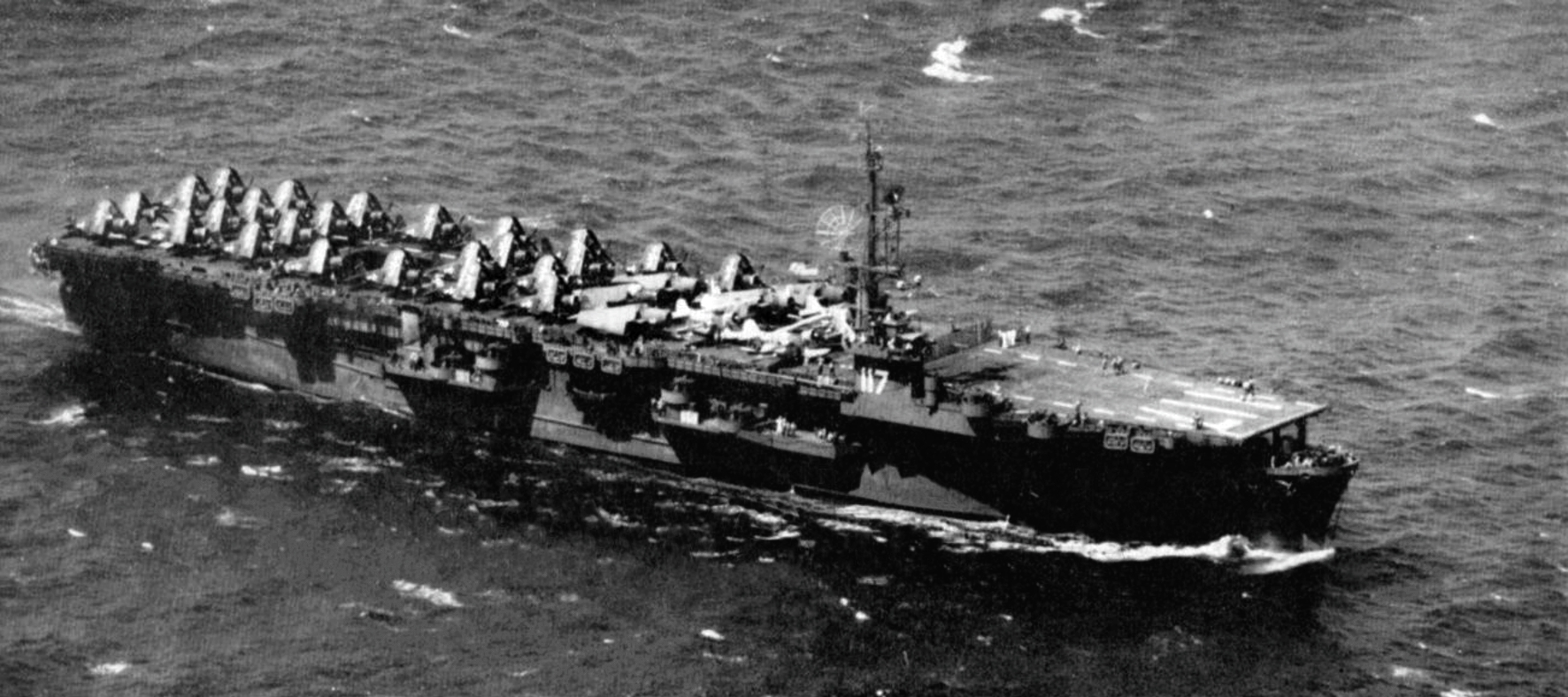
Saidor in the Pacific in 1946

The first fifteen ships of the Commencement Bay class were ordered on 23 January 1943, allocated to Fiscal Year 1944. The keel for the ship, originally named Saltery Bay, was laid down on 5 June 1944 at the Todd-Pacific Shipyards in Tacoma, Washington. She was launched on 17 March 1945, and during construction, she was renamed Saidor, after the eponymous village that had been invaded by Allied forces in January 1944. After work was completed on the ship, she was commissioned on 4 September 1945, shortly after the surrender of Japan ended World War II. Saidor conducted her initial training and shakedown cruise off the West Coast of the United States, and then operated out of Pearl Harbor from 12 December to 20 March 1946. Saidor was thereafter temporarily transferred to the Atlantic Fleet, operating from Norfolk, Virginia, from 16 to 22 April. She then returned to California.

On 6 May, she departed for the Bikini Atoll in support of the Operation Crossroads nuclear tests. From 1 to 25 July, men from the ship photographed the tests to document their effects and processed the film. She got underway again on 4 August to return to San Diego. She remained there for the rest of the year, and in 1947, her crew began work to deactivate the ship. Saidor was decommissioned on 12 September 1947 and assigned to the Pacific Reserve Fleet, still based in San Diego. Ten of the Commencement Bay-class ships saw significant service postwar as anti-submarine warfare (ASW) carriers, but they were small and had difficulty operating the new Grumman AF Guardian patrol planes, so the rest of the class remained laid up, and they were soon replaced in the ASW role by much larger Essex-class aircraft carriers. She was reclassified with the hull number CVHE-117 on 12 June 1955, and then again with the number AKV-17 on 7 May 1959. She remained in the fleet's inventory for another decade, before ultimately being struck from the Naval Vessel Register on 1 December 1970. She was then sold on 22 October 1971 to the Portland, Oregon, based ship breaking firm American Ship Dismantlers.
