= USS Puget Sound (CVE-113) =

Commencement Bay-class escort carrier of the US Navy

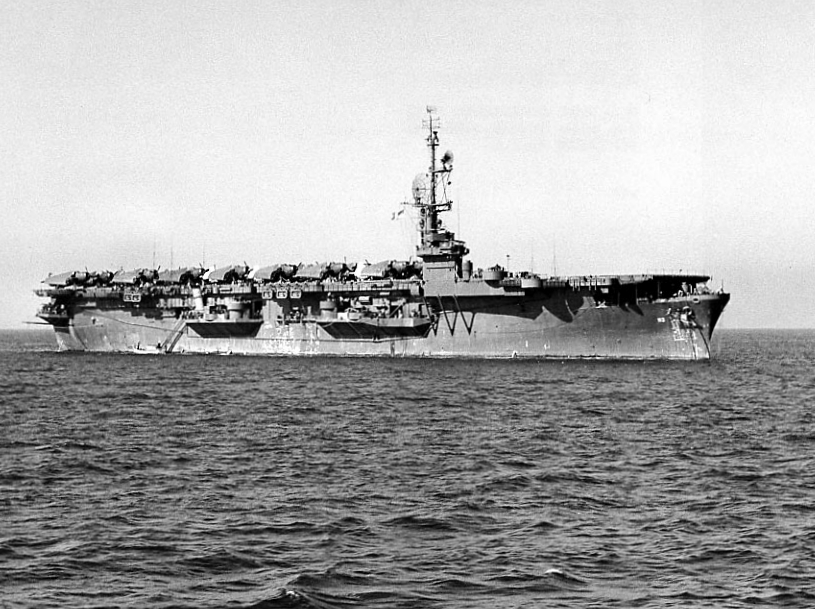
- USS Puget Sound in October 1945

History

United States
- Name: USS Puget Sound
- Namesake: Puget Sound in Washington
- Builder: Todd Pacific Shipyards
- Laid down: 12 May 1944
- Launched: 20 September 1944
- Commissioned: 18 June 1945
- Decommissioned: 18 October 1946
- Fate: Sold for scrap, 10 January 1962

General characteristics
- Class & type: Commencement Bay-class escort carrier
- Displacement: 21,397 long tons (21,740 t)
- Length: 557 ft 1 in (169.80 m) loa
- Beam: 75 ft (23 m)
- Draft: 32 ft (9.8 m)
- Installed power: 16,000 shp (12,000 kW); 4 × boilers
- Propulsion: 2 × Steam turbines; 2 × screw propellers
- Speed: 19 knots (35 km/h; 22 mph)
- Complement: 1,066
- Armament: 2 × 5 in (127 mm) dual-purpose guns; 36 × 40 mm (1.6 in) Bofors AA guns; 20 × 20 mm (0.8 in) Oerlikon AA guns
- Aircraft carried: 33
- Aviation facilities: 2 × aircraft catapults

USS Puget Sound was a Commencement Bay-class escort carrier of the United States Navy. The Commencement Bay class were built during World War II, and were an improvement over the earlier Sangamon class, which were converted from oil tankers. They were capable of carrying an air group of 33 planes and were armed with an anti-aircraft battery of 5 in (127 mm), 40 mm (1.6 in), and 20 mm (0.8 in) guns. The ships were capable of a top speed of 19 knots (35 km/h; 22 mph), and due to their origin as tankers, had extensive fuel storage.

== Design ==
In 1941, as United States participation in World War II became increasingly likely, the US Navy embarked on a construction program for escort carriers, which were converted from transport ships of various types. Many of the escort carrier types were converted from C3-type transports, but the Sangamon-class escort carriers were instead rebuilt oil tankers. These proved to be very successful ships, and the Commencement Bay class, authorized for Fiscal Year 1944, were an improved version of the Sangamon design. The new ships were faster, had improved aviation facilities, and had better internal compartmentation. They proved to be the most successful of the escort carriers, and the only class to be retained in active service after the war, since they were large enough to operate newer aircraft.

Puget Sound was 557 ft 1 in (169.80 m) long overall, with a beam of 75 ft (23 m) at the waterline, which extended to 105 ft 2 in (32.05 m) at maximum. She displaced 21,397 long tons (21,740 t) at full load, of which 12,876 long tons (13,083 t) could be fuel oil (though some of her storage tanks were converted to permanently store seawater for ballast), and at full load she had a draft of 27 ft 11 in (8.51 m). The ship's superstructure consisted of a small island. She had a complement of 1,066 officers and enlisted men.

The ship was powered by two Allis-Chalmers geared steam turbines, each driving one screw propeller, using steam provided by four Combustion Engineering-manufactured water-tube boilers. The propulsion system was rated to produce a total of 16,000 shp (12,000 kW) for a top speed of 19 knots (35 km/h; 22 mph). Given the very large storage capacity for oil, the ships of the Commencement Bay class could steam for some 23,900 nautical miles (44,300 km; 27,500 mi) at a speed of 15 knots (28 km/h; 17 mph).

Her defensive anti-aircraft armament consisted of two 5 in (127 mm) dual-purpose guns in single mounts, thirty-six 40 mm (2 in) Bofors guns, and twenty 20 mm (1 in) Oerlikon light AA cannons. The Bofors guns were placed in three quadruple and twelve twin mounts, while the Oerlikon guns were all mounted individually. She carried 33 planes, which could be launched from two aircraft catapults. Two elevators transferred aircraft from the hangar to the flight deck.

== Service history ==
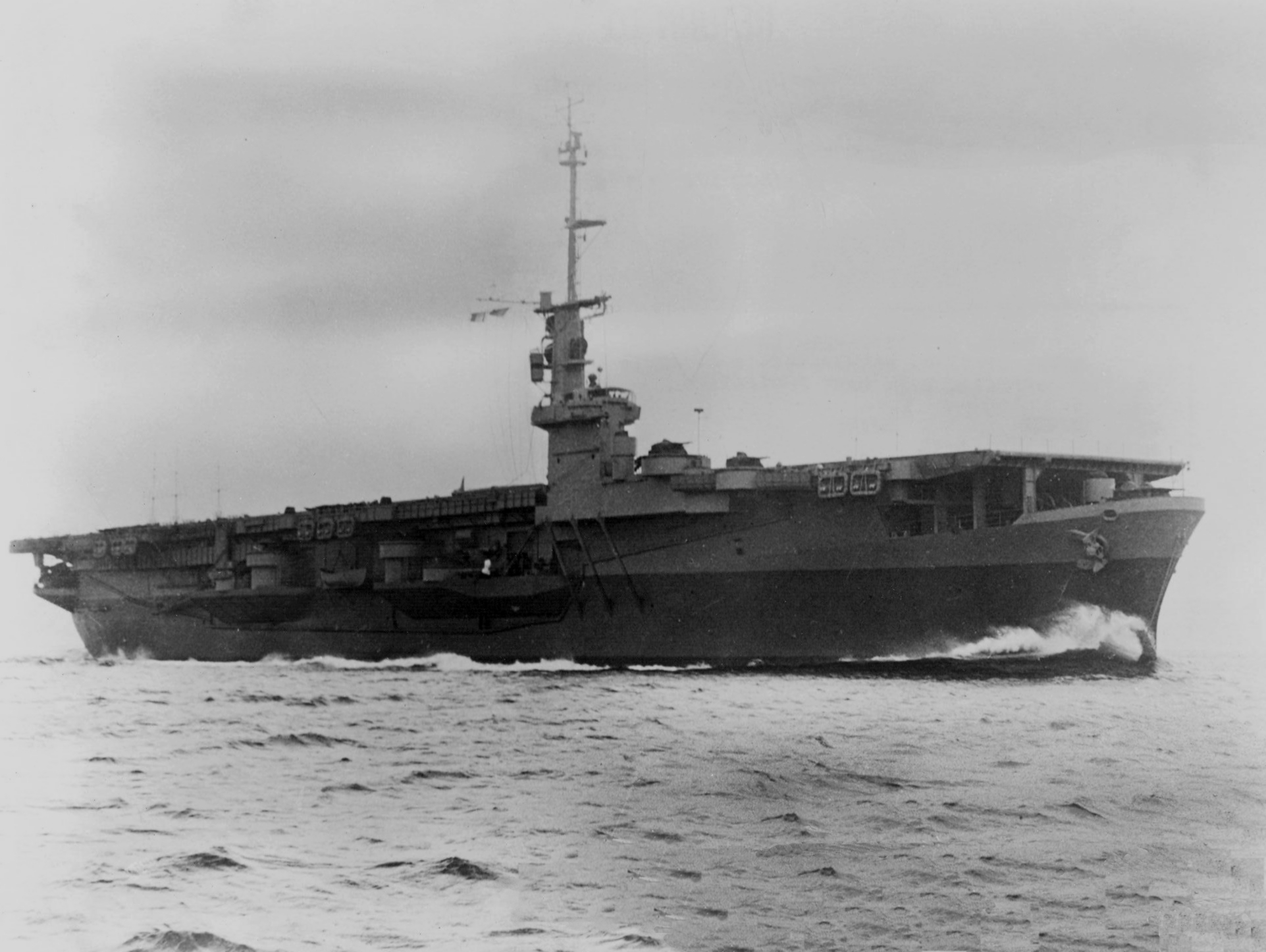
Puget Sound underway soon after entering service in June 1944

The first fifteen ships of the Commencement Bay class were ordered on 23 January 1943, allocated to Fiscal Year 1944. The ship was part of this order, which was allocated to the Todd-Pacific Shipyards in Tacoma, Washington. She was originally laid down on 12 May 1944, under the name Hobart Bay, but on 5 June, the seaplane tender Puget Sound was renamed Salisburg Sound and Hobart Bay took the name Puget Sound. The new escort carrier was launched on 20 November, and after completing fitting out work, was commissioned into the fleet on 18 June 1945. The ship then conducted her initial sea trials, after which repairs and modifications were made at the Puget Sound Naval Shipyard, the ship's namesake Navy facility. She got underway on 6 July for San Diego, California for a shakedown cruise. While in San Diego, she took on Marine Air Group (MAG) 6. On 8 September, she left for Pearl Harbor, where she took part in training exercises in preparation for occupation duties in Japan, which had recently surrendered, ending World War II.

On 14 October, Puget Sound arrived in Tokyo Bay. She contributed her aircraft to anti-mine patrols to clear the way for the Tenth United States Army to land at Matsuyama and Nagoya as part of the occupation force. She thereafter departed to participate in a cruise to the Philippines, Hong Kong, and then the Mariana Islands, during which she carried out various tactical training exercises. She embarked surplus aircraft while in Apra Harbor, Guam, before departing for Pearl Harbor on 6 January 1946. She unloaded the planes there and then proceeded on to San Diego, arriving there on 23 January. There, MAG 6 left the ship to clear room for Puget Sound to serve as a repatriation transport as part of Operation Magic Carpet. She made two such voyages between San Diego and Pearl Harbor, and another from Alameda, California, and Okinawa over the course of February to May. She transported some 1,200 returning veterans along with aircraft no longer needed in the western Pacific.

On 24 May, Puget Sound sailed north to the Puget Sound Naval Shipyard, where she was prepared to be deactivated and assigned to the reserve. She was decommissioned on 18 October and assigned to the Pacific Reserve Fleet based in Tacoma. Ten of the Commencement Bay-class ships saw significant service postwar as anti-submarine warfare (ASW) carriers, but they were small and had difficulty operating the new Grumman AF Guardian patrol planes, so the rest of the class remained laid up, and they were soon replaced in the ASW role by much larger Essex-class aircraft carriers. On 12 June 1955, she was assigned the new hull number CVHE-113, and later that decade, she was reclassified as a cargo ship and aircraft transport, with the hull number AKV-13. She remained in the Navy's inventory until she was struck from the Naval Vessel Register on 1 June 1960. She was sold to the Nicholai Joffee Corporation for scrap on 10 January 1962. She was then towed to Hong Kong, where she was broken up later that year.
