= Lingayen (disambiguation) =

Lingayen is the capital of Pangasinan province, in the Philippines.

Lingayen may also refer to:

- Lingayen Gulf, a gulf in the Philippines
  - Invasion of Lingayen Gulf, an Allied amphibious operation in the Philippines during World War II
- USS Lingayen, a Commencement Bay class escort carrier of the United States Navy
