= USS Commencement Bay =

Commencement Bay-class escort carrier of the US Navy

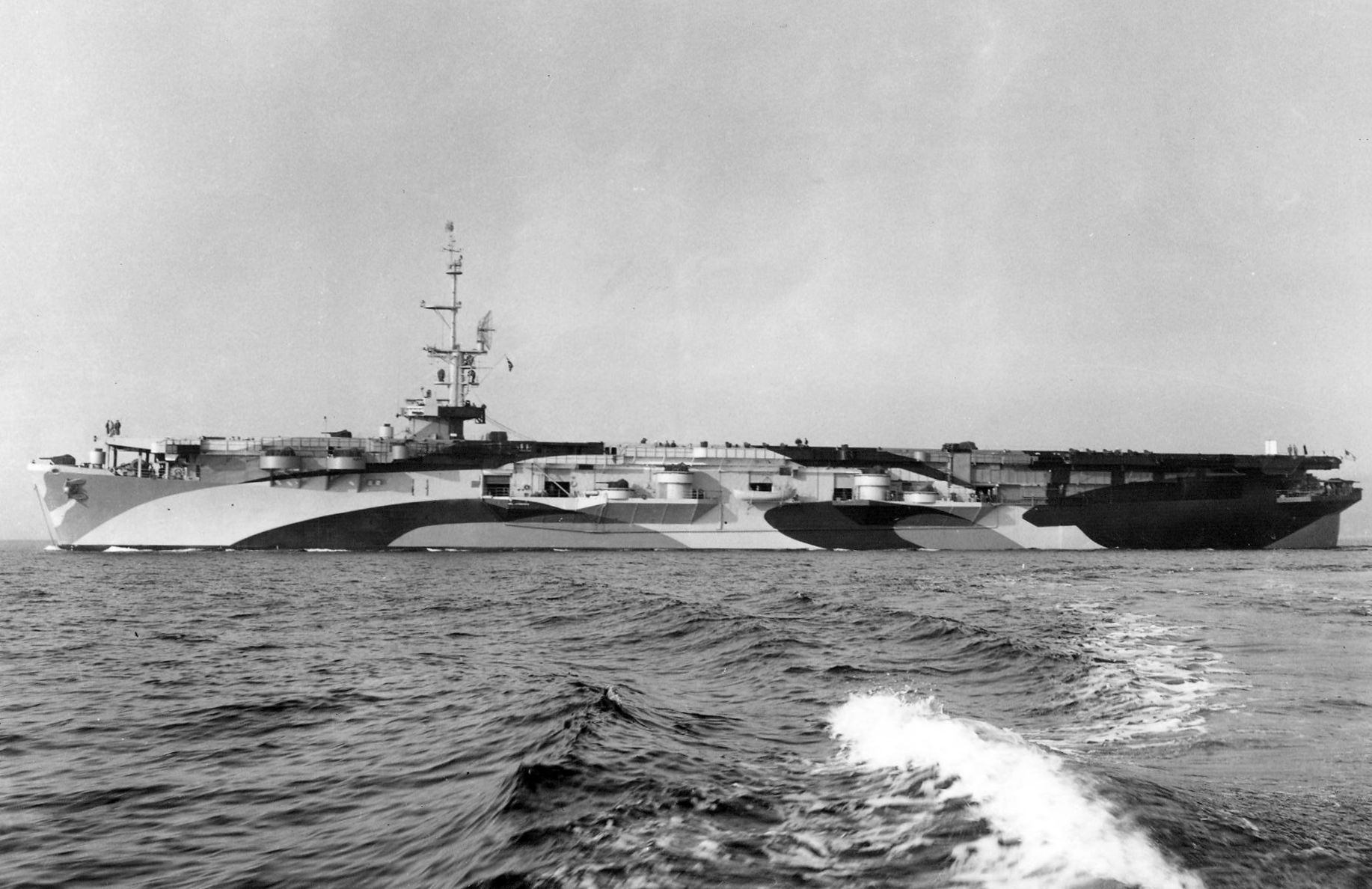
- USS Commencement Bay in early 1945

History

United States
- Name: Commencement Bay
- Namesake: Commencement Bay
- Builder: Todd Pacific Shipyards
- Laid down: 23 September 1943
- Launched: 9 May 1944
- Commissioned: 27 November 1944
- Decommissioned: 30 November 1946
- Stricken: 1 April 1971
- Fate: Sold for scrap, 25 August 1972

General characteristics
- Class & type: Commencement Bay-class escort carrier
- Displacement: 21,397 long tons (21,740 t)
- Length: 557 ft 1 in (169.80 m) loa
- Beam: 75 ft (23 m)
- Draft: 32 ft (9.8 m)
- Installed power: 16,000 shp (12,000 kW); 4 × boilers
- Propulsion: 2 × Steam turbines; 2 × screw propellers
- Speed: 19 knots (35 km/h; 22 mph)
- Complement: 1,066
- Armament: 2 × 5 in (127 mm) dual-purpose guns; 36 × 40 mm (1.6 in) Bofors AA guns; 20 × 20 mm (0.8 in) Oerlikon AA guns
- Aircraft carried: 33
- Aviation facilities: 2 × aircraft catapults

USS Commencement Bay (hull number: CVE-105), originally named St. Joseph Bay, was the lead ship of her class of escort carriers of the United States Navy. The Commencement Bay class were built during World War II, and were an improvement over the earlier Sangamon class, which were converted from oil tankers. They were capable of carrying an air group of 33 planes and were armed with an anti-aircraft battery of 5 in (127 mm), 40 mm (1.6 in), and 20 mm (0.8 in) guns. The ships were capable of a top speed of 19 knots (35 km/h; 22 mph), and due to their origin as tankers, had extensive fuel storage. Commencement Bay was employed as a training ship during the war, training new crews for the other members of her class as they were completed. She saw no active service after the war ended in 1945, instead being assigned to the Pacific Reserve Fleet, and was eventually sold for scrap in 1972.

== Design ==
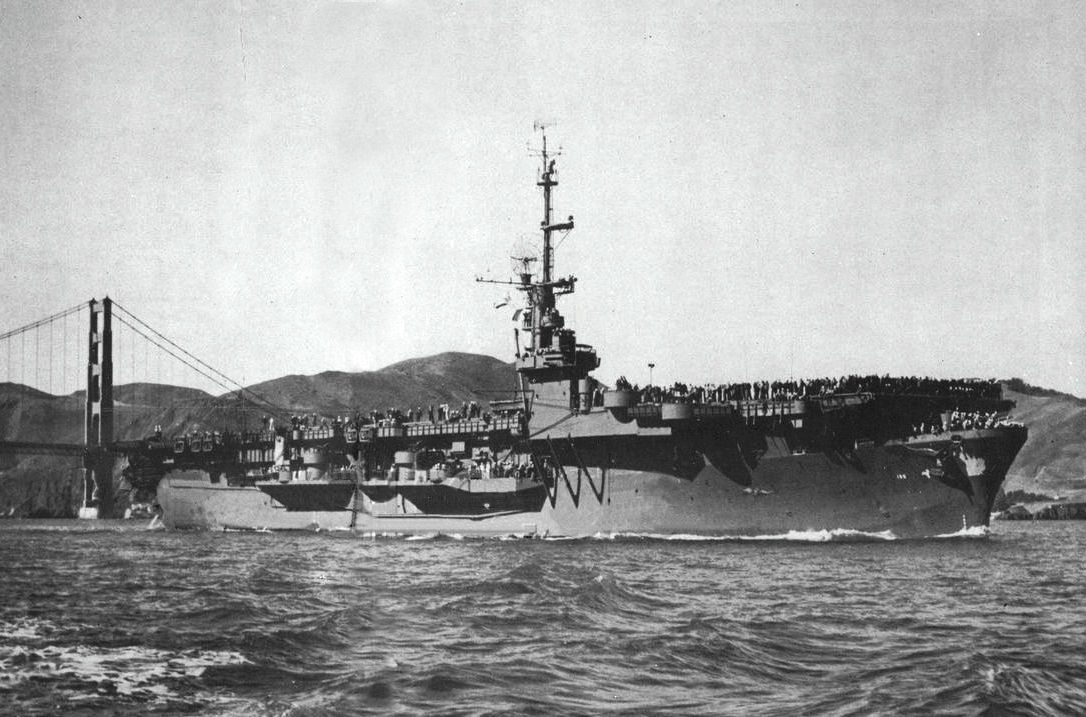
Commencement Bay in San Francisco in 1945

In 1941, as United States participation in World War II became increasingly likely, the US Navy embarked on a construction program for escort carriers, which were converted from transport ships of various types. Many of the escort carrier types were converted from C3-type transports, but the Sangamon-class escort carriers were instead rebuilt oil tankers. These proved to be very successful ships, and the Commencement Bay class, authorized for Fiscal Year 1944, were an improved version of the Sangamon design. The new ships were faster, had improved aviation facilities, and had better internal compartmentation. They proved to be the most successful of the escort carriers, and the only class to be retained in active service after the war, since they were large enough to operate newer aircraft.

Commencement Bay was 557 ft 1 in (169.80 m) long overall, with a beam of 75 ft (23 m) at the waterline, which extended to 105 ft 2 in (32.05 m) at maximum. She displaced 21,397 long tons (21,740 t) at full load, of which 12,876 long tons (13,083 t) could be fuel oil (though some of her storage tanks were converted to permanently store seawater for ballast), and at full load she had a draft of 27 ft 11 in (8.51 m). The ship's superstructure consisted of a small island. She had a complement of 1,066 officers and enlisted men.

The ship was powered by two Allis-Chalmers geared steam turbines, each driving one screw propeller, using steam provided by four Combustion Engineering-manufactured water-tube boilers. The propulsion system was rated to produce a total of 16,000 shp (12,000 kW) for a top speed of 19 knots (35 km/h; 22 mph). Given the very large storage capacity for oil, the ships of the Commencement Bay class could steam for some 23,900 nautical miles (44,300 km; 27,500 mi) at a speed of 15 knots (28 km/h; 17 mph).

Her defensive anti-aircraft armament consisted of two 5 in (127 mm) dual-purpose guns in single mounts, thirty-six 40 mm (2 in) Bofors guns, and twenty 20 mm (1 in) Oerlikon light AA cannons. The Bofors guns were placed in three quadruple and twelve twin mounts, while the Oerlikon guns were all mounted individually. She carried 33 planes, which could be launched from two aircraft catapults. Two elevators transferred aircraft from the hangar to the flight deck.

== Service history ==
The first fifteen ships of the Commencement Bay class were ordered on 23 January 1943, allocated to Fiscal Year 1944. The first ship of the class was laid down on 23 September 1943 at the Todd Pacific Shipyards in Tacoma, Washington, originally under the name St. Joseph Bay. She was renamed Commencement Bay during construction, after the nearby Commencement Bay in Puget Sound. On 9 May 1944, the ship was launched, and after completing fitting out work, was commissioned into active service on 27 November.

On 1 February 1945, Commencement Bay moved to Seattle, Washington, where she began her active career as a training ship. She operated in this role in Puget Sound for the next nine months, during which time she trained some 545 officers and 5,053 enlisted men who went on to serve aboard Commencement Bay's sister ships as they were completed at the Todd Pacific facilities. She also qualified 249 pilots from eight air groups for carrier operations. On 21 October, she departed Bremerton, Washington, bound for Pearl Harbor, Hawaii, arriving there on 4 November. She spent the next three weeks participating in carrier qualification training, and on 27 November, departed to return to Seattle. She then moved on to Tacoma soon thereafter.

Over the course of the following months, Commencement Bay sailed south to visit Los Angeles and San Pedro, California, before returning to Tacoma on 28 January. She was decommissioned there on 30 November 1946 and allocated to the Pacific Reserve Fleet. Ten of the Commencement Bay-class ships saw significant service postwar as anti-submarine warfare carriers, but they were small and had difficulty operating the new Grumman AF Guardian patrol planes, so they were soon replaced by much larger Essex-class aircraft carriers. She saw no further service, but was reclassified as a helicopter carrier with the hull number CVHE-105 on 12 June 1955. On 7 May 1959, she was reclassified again, now as an aircraft ferry with the hull number AKV-37. She lingered on in the Navy's inventory until 1 April 1971, when she was struck from the Naval Vessel Register. She was eventually sold to ship breakers on 25 August 1972 and subsequently scrapped.
