= USS Palau =

Commencement Bay-class escort carrier of the US Navy

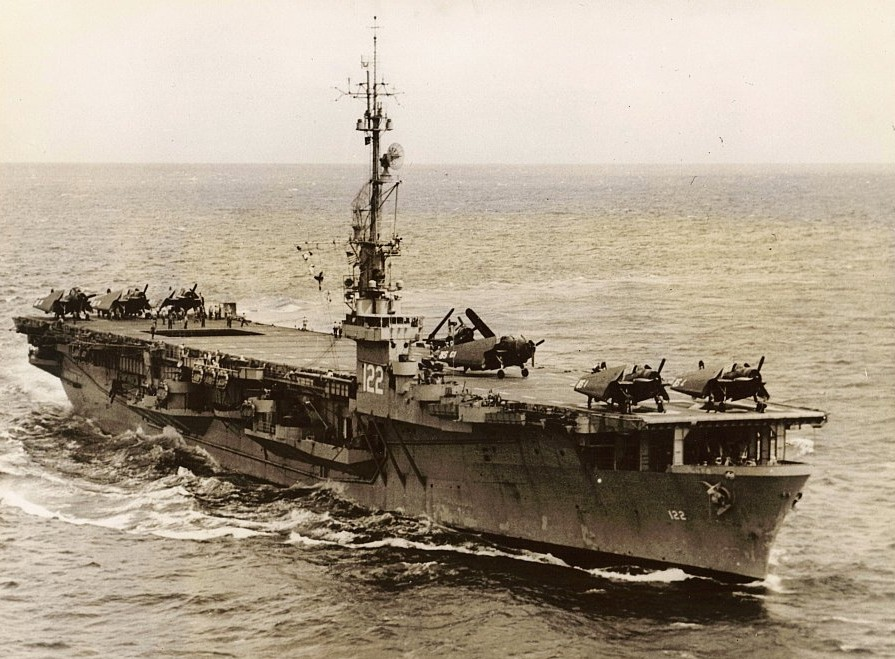
- USS Palau (CVE-122) in 1950

History

United States
- Name: USS Palau
- Builder: Todd Pacific Shipyards
- Laid down: 19 February 1945
- Launched: 6 August 1945
- Commissioned: 15 January 1946
- Decommissioned: 15 June 1954
- Stricken: 1 April 1960
- Fate: Sold for scrapping 13 July 1960

General characteristics
- Class & type: Commencement Bay-class escort carrier
- Displacement: 21,397 long tons (21,740 t)
- Length: 557 ft 1 in (169.80 m) loa
- Beam: 75 ft (23 m)
- Draft: 32 ft (9.8 m)
- Installed power: 16,000 shp (12,000 kW); 4 × boilers
- Propulsion: 2 × Steam turbines; 2 × screw propellers
- Speed: 19 knots (35 km/h; 22 mph)
- Complement: 1,066
- Armament: 2 × 5 in (127 mm) dual-purpose guns; 36 × 40 mm (1.6 in) Bofors AA guns; 20 × 20 mm (0.8 in) Oerlikon AA guns
- Aircraft carried: 33
- Aviation facilities: 2 × aircraft catapults

USS Palau was a Commencement Bay-class escort carrier of the United States Navy. The Commencement Bay class were built during World War II, and were an improvement over the earlier Sangamon class, which were converted from oil tankers. They were capable of carrying an air group of 33 planes and were armed with an anti-aircraft battery of 5 in (127 mm), 40 mm (1.6 in), and 20 mm (0.8 in) guns. The ships were capable of a top speed of 19 knots (35 km/h; 22 mph), and due to their origin as tankers, had extensive fuel storage.

She was laid down by the Todd-Pacific Shipyards Inc., Tacoma, Washington, 19 February 1945; launched 6 August 1945; sponsored by Mrs. J. P. Whitney; and commissioned 15 January 1946.

== Design ==
In 1941, as United States participation in World War II became increasingly likely, the US Navy embarked on a construction program for escort carriers, which were converted from transport ships of various types. Many of the escort carrier types were converted from C3-type transports, but the Sangamon-class escort carriers were instead rebuilt oil tankers. These proved to be very successful ships, and the Commencement Bay class, authorized for Fiscal Year 1944, were an improved version of the Sangamon design. The new ships were faster, had improved aviation facilities, and had better internal compartmentation. They proved to be the most successful of the escort carriers, and the only class to be retained in active service after the war, since they were large enough to operate newer aircraft.

Palau was 557 ft 1 in (169.80 m) long overall, with a beam of 75 ft (23 m) at the waterline, which extended to 105 ft 2 in (32.05 m) at maximum. She displaced 21,397 long tons (21,740 t) at full load, of which 12,876 long tons (13,083 t) could be fuel oil (though some of her storage tanks were converted to permanently store seawater for ballast), and at full load she had a draft of 27 ft 11 in (8.51 m). The ship's superstructure consisted of a small island. She had a complement of 1,066 officers and enlisted men.

The ship was powered by two Allis-Chalmers geared steam turbines, each driving one screw propeller, using steam provided by four Combustion Engineering-manufactured water-tube boilers. The propulsion system was rated to produce a total of 16,000 shp (12,000 kW) for a top speed of 19 knots (35 km/h; 22 mph). Given the very large storage capacity for oil, the ships of the Commencement Bay class could steam for some 23,900 nautical miles (44,300 km; 27,500 mi) at a speed of 15 knots (28 km/h; 17 mph).

Her defensive anti-aircraft armament consisted of two 5 in (127 mm) dual-purpose guns in single mounts, thirty-six 40 mm (2 in) Bofors guns, and twenty 20 mm (1 in) Oerlikon light AA cannons. The Bofors guns were placed in three quadruple and twelve twin mounts, while the Oerlikon guns were all mounted individually. She carried 33 planes, which could be launched from two aircraft catapults. Two elevators transferred aircraft from the hangar to the flight deck.

== Service history ==
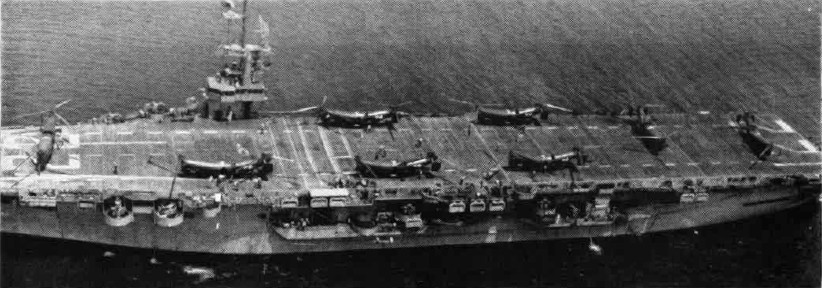
USS Palau with HRP helicopters, in 1951.

The first fifteen ships of the Commencement Bay class were ordered on 23 January 1943, allocated to Fiscal Year 1944. Palau was laid down at the Todd Pacific Shipyards facility in Tacoma, Washington, on 19 February 1945. She was launched on 6 August and commissioned on 15 January 1946. By that time, World War II had ended, and so Palau completed her initial shakedown cruise off California, passed through the Panama Canal, steamed to Boston, and then on 11 May, sailed for Norfolk, Virginia, where she was laid up in reserve.

The ship was reactivated in May 1947, departing on 22 May for Cuba for training exercises in the area. She then returned to Norfolk and then New York, where her crew made preparations for a lengthy voyage abroad. She sailed south for Recife, Brazil, and then turned east to West Africa. She arrived back in the United States on 16 August, stopping first in Boston for repairs, and then proceeding back to Norfolk to return to the reserve fleet in December.

She was reactivated again in March 1948 for training exercises off the East Coast of the United States. These included parts of the Packard series of combined amphibious and helicopter assault experiments with the recently created Marine helicopter squadron HMX-1. Palau first participated in Packard II, which involved five Sikorsky H-19 Chickasaw helicopters taking part in the so-called "vertical assault" concept. Packard III followed in May, in which eight helicopters operated from Palau, simulating a full-scale attack by 184 helicopters. Over the course of Packard III, the helicopters carried passengers and equipment some ten miles inland to demonstrate the concept of using helicopter-borne troops to seize strategic areas behind the lines while landing craft went ashore. Following the maneuvers, she left for a cruise in the Mediterranean Sea, the purpose of which was to deliver aircraft to Turkey. She transferred the aircraft at Yeşilköy, Turkey, and then returned to Norfolk on 7 August. She spent the next four years cruising off the East Coast, from as far north as Canada and as far south as the West Indies.

In April 1952, Palau got underway from Norfolk for another voyage into the Mediterranean, this time as part of 6th Fleet. She operated in the region until late June, when she transferred back to the East Coast as part of 2nd Fleet. The ship was scheduled to be laid up again in early 1953, but the Navy decided to keep her in active service for a final voyage overseas. She embarked another group of aircraft to be transferred to an allied country, this time to Yokosuka, Japan. The voyage lasted from 8 August to 22 October, at which point she entered the Philadelphia Naval Shipyard, where she was decommissioned for the last time on 15 June 1954. By this time, the Navy had begun replacing the Commencement Bay-class ships with much larger Essex-class aircraft carriers, since the former were too small to operate newer and more effective anti-submarine patrol planes. Proposals to radically rebuild the Commencement Bays either with an angled flight deck and various structural improvements or lengthen their hulls by 30 ft (9.1 m) and replace their propulsion machinery to increase speed came to nothing, as they were deemed to be too expensive. Palau was allocated to the Philadelphia Group of the Atlantic Reserve Fleet, where she remained for the next six years. She was struck from the naval register on 1 April 1960 and sold on 13 July to ship breakers in New York.

Some parts were salvaged from the scrapyard in Sestao, and installed in Picos de Europa as a mountaineers' hut.
