= Siboney, Cuba =

Siboney
- Village
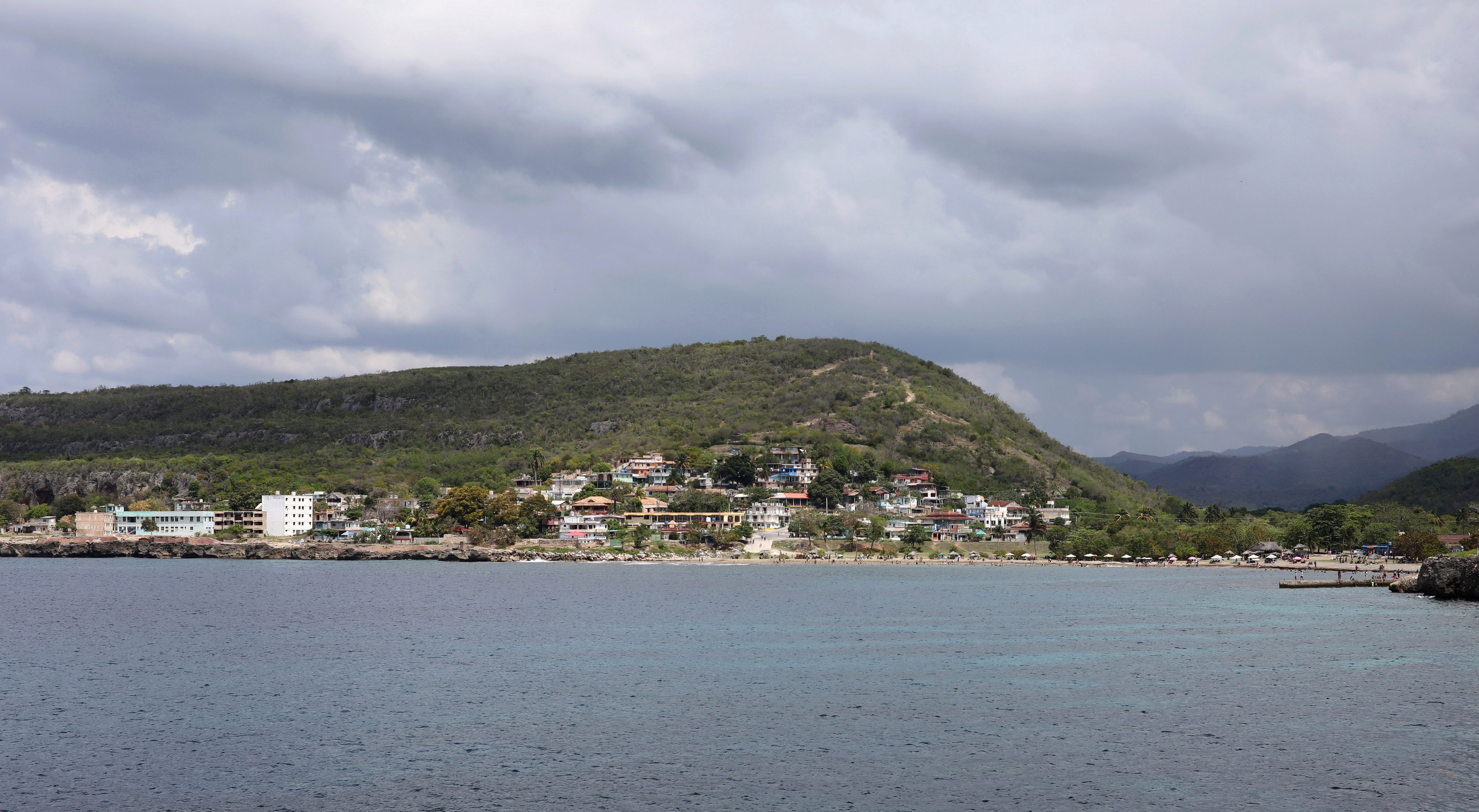
- Siboney

- Location of Siboney in Cuba
- Coordinates: 19°57′38.88″N 75°42′27.36″W
- Country: Cuba
- Province: Santiago de Cuba
- Municipality: Santiago de Cuba

Population (2012)
  - Total: 1,190
- Time zone: UTC-5 (EST)
- Area code: +53-22

Siboney is a Cuban village and consejo popular (i.e.: people's council) located in the east of the city of Santiago de Cuba and belonging to its municipality.

== Geography ==
The village lies by the Caribbean Sea, near the road linking Santiago to Baconao, through the eastern coastal area of Santiago municipality.

== History ==
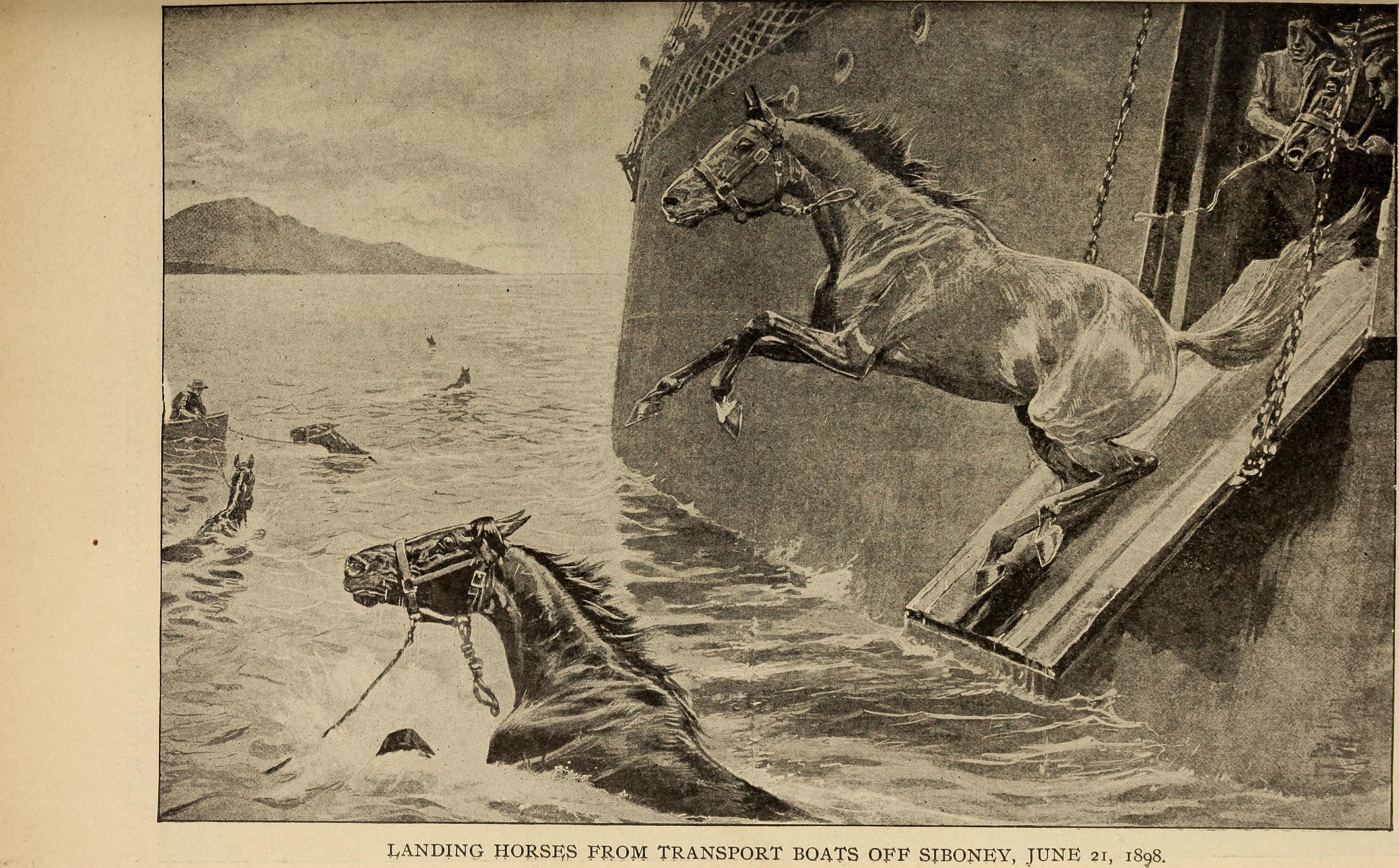
US Army arriving in Siboney

Siboney was known in early modern literature as Altares or Ensenada de los Altares.

In 1898 Siboney and the nearby village of Daiquirí were locations where American forces came ashore in the Spanish–American War. The World War I transport ship USS Siboney (ID-2999) was named for this town, as was the escort carrier USS Siboney (CVE-112).

Siboney was also the location of a farm where Fidel Castro and his men gathered shortly before the attack on the Moncada Barracks, which is widely regarded as the start of the Cuban Revolution.

== Personalities ==
- Compay Segundo (1907–2003), musician

== See also ==
- El Caney
- El Cobre
- Siboney (song)
