= Commencement Bay-class escort carrier =

Aircraft carrier class of the US Navy

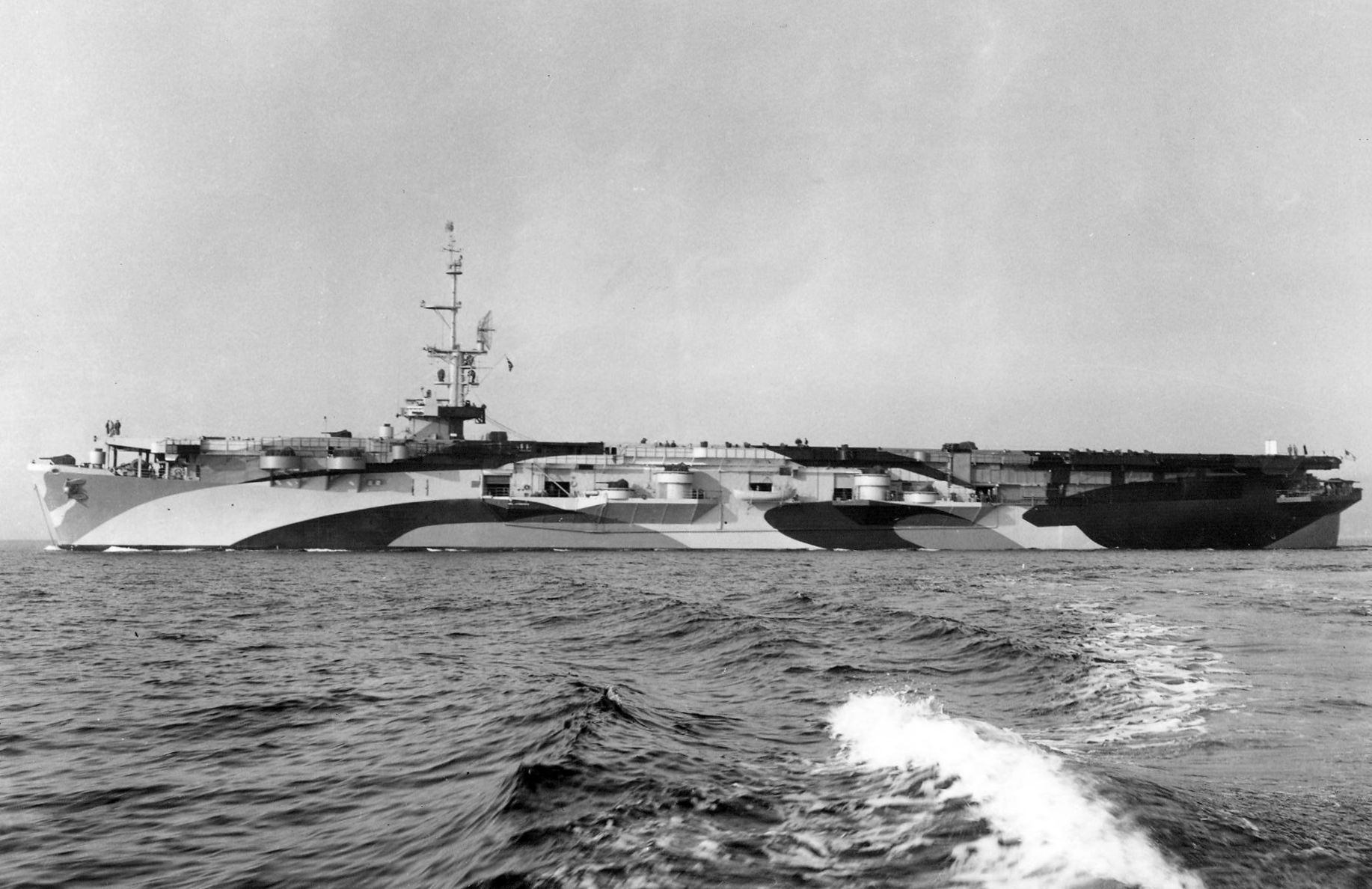
- USS Commencement Bay

Class overview
- Builders: Seattle-Tacoma Shipbuilding, Washington
- Operators: United States Navy
- Preceded by: Casablanca class
- Succeeded by: None
- Built: 1943–1945
- In service: 1944–1957
- Planned: 35
- Completed: 19
- Canceled: 16
- Scrapped: 19

General characteristics
- Type: Escort carrier
- Displacement: 10,900 long tons (11,075 t) standard; 24,100 long tons (24,487 t) full load
- Length: 525 ft (160 m) wl; 557 ft 1 in (169.80 m) oa; 501 ft (153 m) (fd)
- Beam: 75 ft (23 m); 105 ft 2 in (32.05 m) flight deck
- Draft: 30 ft 8 in (9.35 m)
- Installed power: 16,000 shp (11,931 kW)
- Propulsion: 4 × Boilers; 2 × Allis-Chambers geared steam turbines; 2 × screws
- Speed: 19 knots (22 mph; 35 km/h)
- Complement: 1,066 officers and men
- Armament: 2 × 5 inches (127 mm) guns (1 × 2); 36 × 40 mm (1.6 in) Bofors gun (3 × 4, 12 × 2); 20 × 20 mm (0.8 in) Oerlikon cannons
- Aircraft carried: 34

The Commencement Bay-class escort aircraft carriers were the last class of escort carriers built for the US Navy in World War II.

The ships were based on the hull of the Maritime Commission type T3 tanker, which gave them a displacement of approximately 23,000 tons and a length of 557 feet (170 m). Unlike most earlier escort carrier classes, which were laid down as something else and converted to aircraft carriers mid-construction, the Commencement Bays were built as carriers from the keel up. Their general layout was similar to the Sangamon-class escort carriers, but some of the Sangamon's engineering shortcomings were addressed.

They entered service late in World War II – USS Commencement Bay launched on 9 May 1944 – so most of them saw little or no operational service. Only Block Island, Gilbert Islands, Cape Gloucester and Vella Gulf saw action in the Pacific, while the lead ship Commencement Bay was used as a training vessel only during wartime. Thirty-five of them were ordered but many were cancelled prior to completion. Nineteen saw commissioned service in the US Navy, four were broken up on the ways at the end of the war, two were accepted from the builders but never commissioned, and the remainder were cancelled before being laid down.

After the war they were seen as potential helicopter, anti-submarine, or auxiliary (transport) carriers, and a number of ships served in these roles during the Korean War. The oncoming Jet Age ended their careers, as the ships were no longer large enough to safely carry the much larger jet aircraft of the late 1950s, and all units were out of service or reclassified by 1960.

== Ships ==
All of the Commencement Bay-class escort carriers that were laid down were built by the Seattle-Tacoma Shipbuilding Corporation (a.k.a. Todd Pacific Shipyards) in the Commencement Bay, Tacoma, Washington yard, in addition to the planned (but unnamed) ships CVE-128 through CVE-131. Planned (but unnamed) ships CVE-132 through CVE-139 were to be built by Kaiser Shipbuilding Company, in Vancouver, Washington, but were never laid down.

List of Commencement Bay-class escort carriers
Ship name	Hull no.	Laid down	Launched	Commissioned	Decommissioned	Fate
Commencement Bay (ex-St. Joseph Bay)	CVE-105	23 September 1943	9 May 1944	27 November 1944	30 November 1946	Struck 1 April 1971; Sold for scrap 25 August 1972
Block Island (ex-Sunset Bay)	CVE-106	25 October 1943	10 June 1944	30 December 1944	27 August 1954	Struck 1 July 1959; Sold for scrap 23 February 1960
Gilbert Islands (ex-St. Andrews Bay)	CVE-107	29 November 1943	20 July 1944	5 February 1945	21 May 1946	Struck 15 October 1976; Sold for scrap 1 November 1979
Gilbert Islands (ex-St. Andrews Bay)	CVE-107	29 November 1943	20 July 1944	5 February 1951	15 January 1955	Struck 15 October 1976; Sold for scrap 1 November 1979
Kula Gulf (ex-Vermillion Bay)	CVE-108	16 December 1943	15 August 1944	12 May 1945	3 July 1946	Struck 15 September 1970; Sold for scrap 1971
Kula Gulf (ex-Vermillion Bay)	CVE-108	16 December 1943	15 August 1944	15 February 1951	15 December 1955	Struck 15 September 1970; Sold for scrap 1971
Cape Gloucester (ex-Willapa Bay)	CVE-109	10 January 1944	12 September 1944	5 March 1945	5 November 1946	Struck 1 April 1971; Sold for scrap
Salerno Bay (ex-Winjah Bay)	CVE-110	7 February 1944	19 October 1944	19 May 1945	4 October 1947	Struck 1 June 1960; Sold for scrap 30 October 1961
Salerno Bay (ex-Winjah Bay)	CVE-110	7 February 1944	19 October 1944	20 June 1951	16 February 1954	Struck 1 June 1960; Sold for scrap 30 October 1961
Vella Gulf (ex-Totem Bay)	CVE-111	7 March 1944	19 October 1944	9 April 1945	9 August 1946	Struck 1 December 1970; Sold for scrap 22 October 1971
Siboney (ex-Frosty Bay)	CVE-112	1 April 1944	9 November 1944	14 May 1945	6 December 1949	Struck 1 June 1970; Scrapped 1971
Siboney (ex-Frosty Bay)	CVE-112	1 April 1944	9 November 1944	22 November 1950	31 July 1956	Struck 1 June 1970; Scrapped 1971
Puget Sound (ex-Hobart Bay)	CVE-113	12 May 1944	20 September 1944	18 June 1945	18 October 1946	Struck 1 June 1960; Sold for scrap 10 January 1962
Rendova (ex-Mosser Bay)	CVE-114	15 June 1944	29 December 1944	22 October 1945	27 January 1950	Struck 1 April 1971; Sold for scrap 1971
Rendova (ex-Mosser Bay)	CVE-114	15 June 1944	29 December 1944	3 January 1951	30 June 1955	Struck 1 April 1971; Sold for scrap 1971
Bairoko (ex-Portage Bay)	CVE-115	25 July 1944	25 January 1945	16 July 1945	14 April 1950	Struck 1 April 1960; Sold for scrap January 1961
Bairoko (ex-Portage Bay)	CVE-115	25 July 1944	25 January 1945	12 September 1950	18 February 1955	Struck 1 April 1960; Sold for scrap January 1961
Badoeng Strait (ex-San Alberto Bay)	CVE-116	18 August 1944	15 February 1945	14 November 1945	20 April 1946	Struck 1 December 1970; Sold for scrap 8 May 1972
Badoeng Strait (ex-San Alberto Bay)	CVE-116	18 August 1944	15 February 1945	6 January 1947	17 May 1957	Struck 1 December 1970; Sold for scrap 8 May 1972
Saidor (ex-Saltery Bay)	CVE-117	29 September 1944	17 March 1945	4 September 1945	12 September 1947	Struck 1 December 1970; Sold for scrap 22 October 1971
Sicily (ex-Sandy Bay)	CVE-118	23 October 1944	14 April 1945	27 February 1946	4 October 1954	Struck 1 July 1960; Sold for scrap 31 October 1960
Point Cruz (ex-Trocadero Bay)	CVE-119	4 December 1944	18 May 1945	16 October 1945	30 June 1947	Struck 15 September 1970; Sold for scrap 1971
Point Cruz (ex-Trocadero Bay)	CVE-119	4 December 1944	18 May 1945	26 July 1951	31 August 1956	Struck 15 September 1970; Sold for scrap 1971
Mindoro	CVE-120	2 January 1945	27 June 1945	4 December 1945	4 August 1955	Struck 1 December 1959; Sold for scrap June 1960
Rabaul	CVE-121	29 January 1945	14 July 1945	Never commissioned, straight to Reserve Fleet	—N/a	Struck 1 September 1971; Sold for scrap 25 August 1972
Palau	CVE-122	19 February 1945	6 August 1945	15 January 1946	15 June 1954	Struck 1 April 1960; Sold for scrap 13 July 1960
Tinian	CVE-123	20 March 1945	5 September 1945	Never commissioned, straight to Reserve Fleet	—N/a	Struck 1 June 1970; Sold for scrap 15 December 1971
Bastogne	CVE-124	2 April 1945	—N/a	—N/a	—N/a	Cancelled before launching, 12 August 1945
Eniwetok	CVE-125	20 April 1945	—N/a	—N/a	—N/a	Cancelled before launching, 12 August 1945
Lingayen	CVE-126	1 May 1945	—N/a	—N/a	—N/a	Cancelled before launching, 12 August 1945
Okinawa	CVE-127	22 May 1945	—N/a	—N/a	—N/a	Cancelled before launching, 12 August 1945
Unnamed	CVE-128 ⋮ CVE-139	—N/a	—N/a	—N/a	—N/a	Cancelled before being laid down, 12 August 1945

== See also ==
- List of ship classes of the Second World War
