= Sangamon-class escort carrier =

Aircraft carrier class of the US Navy

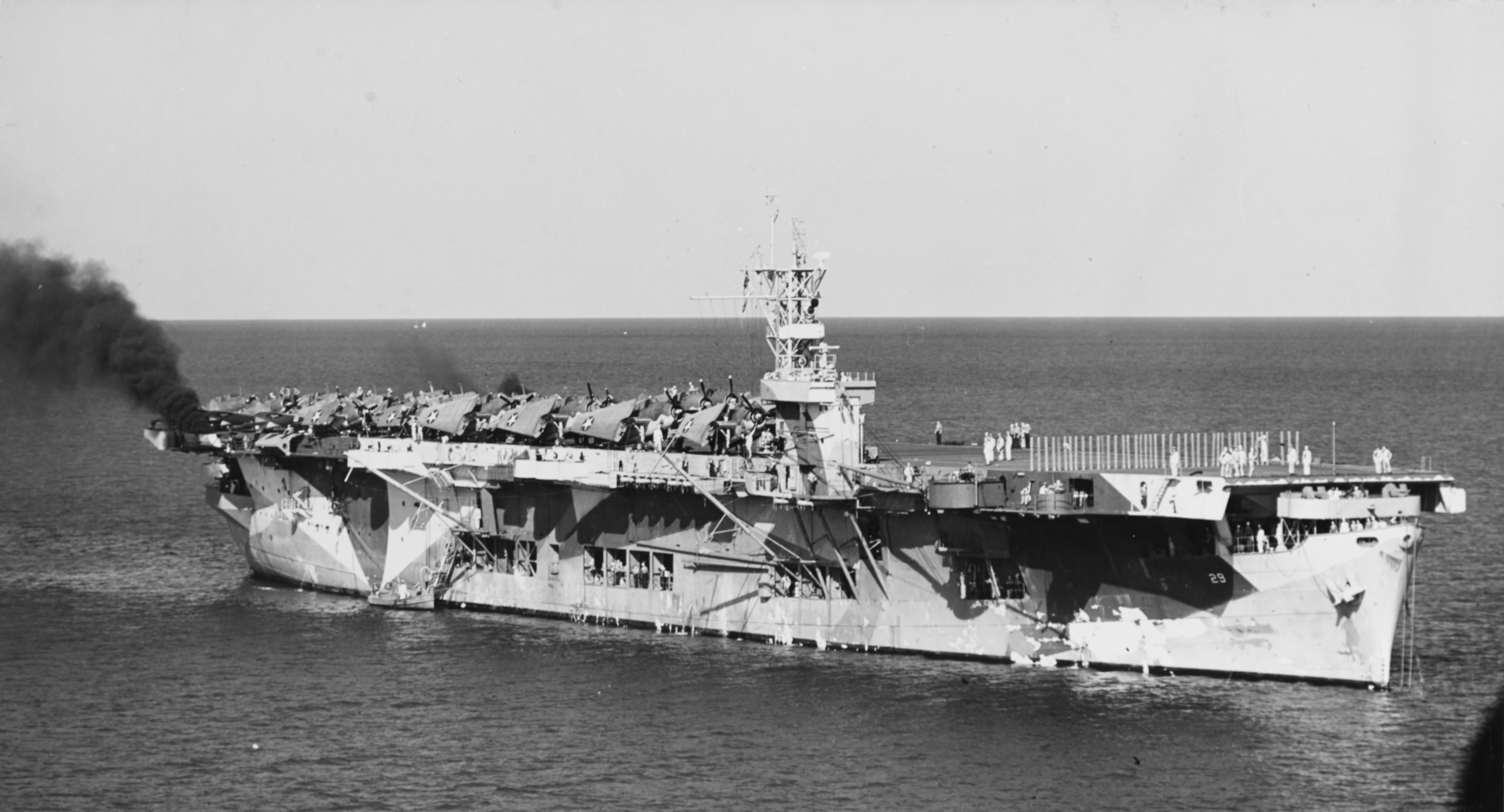
- USS Santee (ACV-29) at anchor, 1942

Class overview
- Name: Sangamon-class escort carrier
- Builders: Federal Shipbuilding and Drydock Company: Sangamon & Suwannee; Sun Shipbuilding & Drydock Co.: Chenango & Santee
- Operators: United States Navy
- Preceded by: Bogue class
- Succeeded by: Casablanca class
- Built: 1942
- In commission: 1942–1947
- Completed: 4
- Retired: 4
- Scrapped: 4

General characteristics
- Type: Escort carrier
- Displacement: 11,400 long tons (11,600 t) (standard load); 24,275 long tons (24,665 t) (full load)
- Length: 525 ft (160 m) wl; 553 ft (169 m) oa; 502 ft (153 m) fd
- Beam: 75 ft (23 m); 114 ft (35 m) extreme width
- Draft: 32 ft (9.8 m)
- Installed power: 13,500 shp (10,067 kW)
- Propulsion: 4 × Boilers (450 psi (3,100 kPa); 2 × Steam turbines; 2 × screws
- Speed: 18 knots (33 km/h; 21 mph)
- Complement: 860-1080 officers and men
- Armament: 2 × Single 127 mm (5.0 in)/51 caliber guns; 4 × Twin 40 mm (1.57 in)/56-caliber Bofors 40 guns; 12 × Single 20 mm (0.79 in) Oerlikon cannons; Additional 20 & 40 mm guns later added
- Aircraft carried: 25-32 Grumman F4F Wildcat & Grumman TBF Avenger or Douglas SBD Dauntless
- Aviation facilities: 1 × Catapult (One additional catapult added later); 2 × Elevators

The Sangamon class were a group of four vessels, built for civilian service, which served in the United States Navy as fleet oilers, and then as escort aircraft carriers, during World War II.

== Overview ==
Originally built as Cimarron-class (Type T3-SE-A1) tankers, for civilian use, but funded in part through Maritime Commission subsidies (which allowed them to be built with more powerful engines than normal, making them suitable for U. S. Navy use as fleet oilers, should the need arise), these four ships were all launched in 1939. All four spent a year in civilian service, then were purchased by the Navy and commissioned into service as fleet oilers. Then, in the spring of 1942, because of a pressing need for escort carriers and a shortage of the Type C3-class cargo ship hulls that had thus far formed the basis for all American escort-carrier conversions, it was (controversally) decided that these four in-service oilers would be taken out of service and converted into escort carriers. Following the US Navy practice during WWII, these vessels, upon being taken into Navy service, had been renamed after rivers, though this was later changed to "Indian rivers in oil-producing regions." They retained those names following their conversions to carriers. The conversions took around six months.

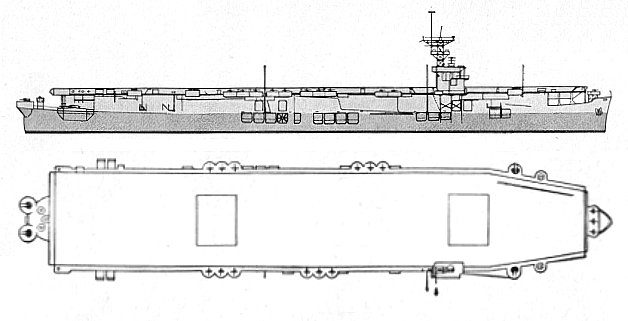

These ships were the largest escort carrier conversions built for the US Navy. The late-war Commencement Bay-class escort carriers were about as large, but were built as carriers from keel up. Being built as T3 tanker oilers, the machinery space was located aft, resulting in the placing of the smokestacks on both sides aft of the flight deck. They were excellent examples of the type, roomy and tough with a large flight deck and good stability on even high seas. The Sangamons could operate about 30 aircraft, and were the only escort carriers to operate dive bombers.

== Service history ==
From late 1942 until the end of the war the ships saw active duty in the Mediterranean, Atlantic and Pacific Campaigns. Three of the class were damaged by Japanese kamikaze attacks at the Battle of Leyte Gulf, but all survived the war. In the Pacific, the carriers often operated together as Carrier Division 22.

The ships were withdrawn from active service shortly after the end of the war. Some of them were kept in reserve and reclassified as helicopter escort carriers (CVHE). All had been sold or scrapped by the early 1960s.

== Ships ==
List of Sangamon-class escort carriers
Ship name	Hull no.	Builder	Laid down	Launched	Recommissioned as escort carrier	Decommissioned	Fate
Sangamon	CVE-26	Federal Shipbuilding and Dry Dock Company, Kearny, New Jersey	13 March 1939	4 November 1939	25 August 1942	24 October 1945	Struck 1 November 1945; Scrapped in Osaka, Japan, August 1960
Suwannee	CVE-27	Federal Shipbuilding and Dry Dock Company, Kearny, New Jersey	3 June 1938	4 March 1939	24 September 1942	8 January 1947	Struck 1 March 1959; Sold for scrap 30 November 1959
Chenango	CVE-28	Sun Shipbuilding and Dry Dock Company, Chester, Pennsylvania	10 July 1938	1 April 1939	19 September 1942	14 August 1946	Struck 1 March 1959; Sold for scrap 12 February 1960
Santee	CVE-29	Sun Shipbuilding and Dry Dock Company, Chester, Pennsylvania	31 May 1938	4 March 1939	24 August 1942	21 October 1946	Struck 1 March 1959; Sold for scrap 5 December 1959

== See also ==
- List of ship classes of the Second World War
- List of aircraft carriers

== Bibliography ==
- A Report on Policies and Practices of the U.S. Navy for Naming the Vessels of the Navy (PDF) (Report). Washington, DC: Department of the Navy. 31 December 2011.
- Silverstone, Paul H. (1965). US Warships of World War II. London: Ian Allan. p. 55. ISBN 9780711001572.
- Silverstone, Paul H. (1986). US Warships since 1945. London: Ian Allan. p. 23. ISBN 0-7110-1598-8.
- Terzibaschitsch, Stefan (1979). Flugzeugtraeger der U.S. Navy. Geleitflugzeugtraeger. Munich: Bernard & Graefe. ISBN 978-3-7637-5212-6.
