= Jacona =

Jacona may refer to:

- Jacona, Michoacán
- SS Jacona (1889), British 2,969 GRT cargo ship sunk by mine 12 August 1915
- SS Jacona (1918), Design 1014 ship converted 1930 into the first floating electric power plant
