= USCGC Elm =

The following ships of the United States Coast Guard have borne the name USCGC Elm;

- USCGC Elm (WAGL-260), a former inland buoy tender in service from 1938 to 1969
- USCGC Elm (WLB-204), a Juniper-class buoy tender which entered service in 1998
