= SS Jacona =

Two steamships were named Jacona:

- SS Jacona (1899), launched in 1889 as Saint Marnock she was renamed Jacona in 1899 and sunk on 12 August 1915
- SS Jacona (1918), launched in 1918 as a Design 1014 ship she was converted into a powership in 1930
