= USCGC Fir =

Two buoy tenders of the United States Coast Guard have borne the name USCGC Fir.

- USCGC Fir (WLM-212) – built in 1938 and decommissioned in 1991.
- USCGC Fir (WLB-213) – launched in August 2003.
