= USCGC Elm (WLB-204) =

U.S. Coast Guard seagoing buoy tender

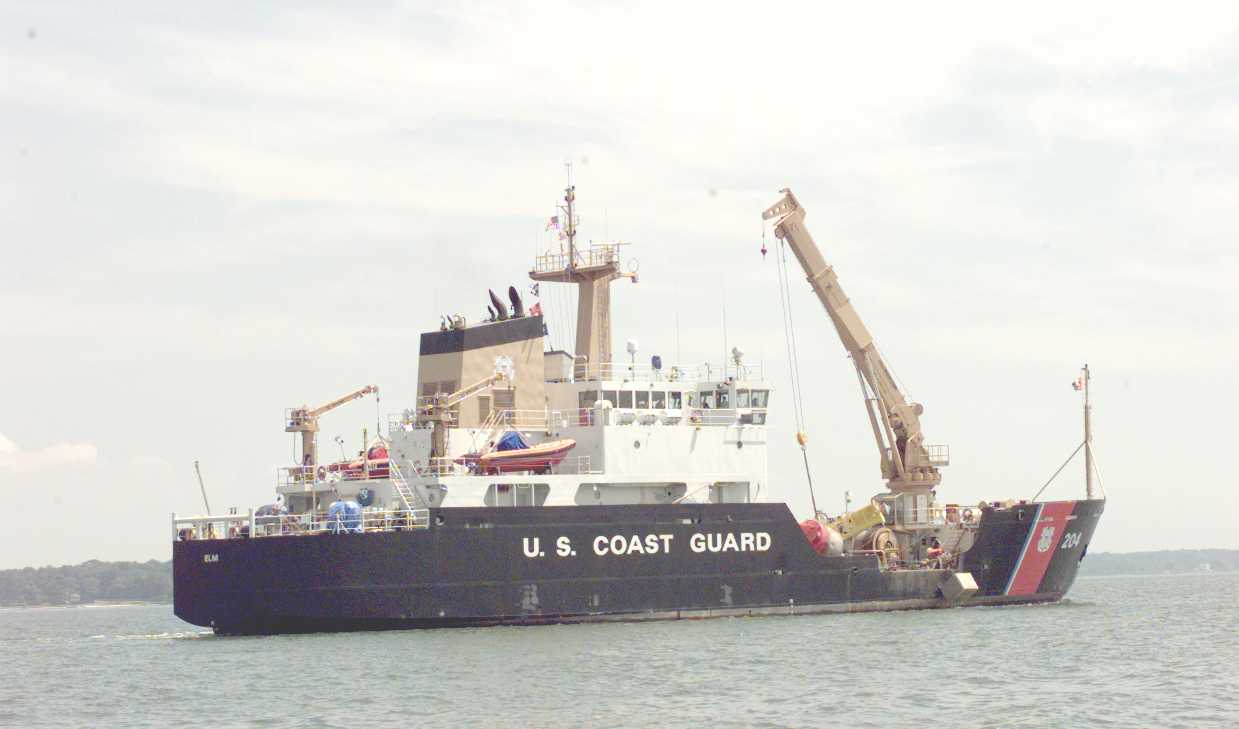
- USCGC Elm

History

United States
- Name: USCGC Elm
- Builder: Marinette Marine Corporation
- Launched: January 24, 1998
- Commissioned: November 20, 1998
- Home port: Astoria, Oregon
- Identification: IMO number: 9155561; MMSI number: 366951000; Callsign: NRPK
- Nickname(s): "The Bartender"
- Status: in active service
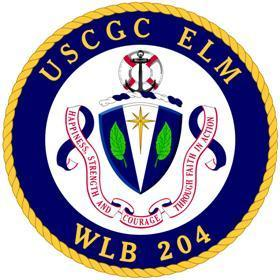
- Badge

General characteristics
- Class & type: Juniper-class Buoy Tender
- Displacement: 2,000 long tons (full load)
- Length: 225 ft (69 m)
- Beam: 46 ft (14 m)
- Draft: 13 ft (4.0 m)
- Installed power: 2 × Caterpillar 3608 engines; 3,100 shp (2,300 kW) each
- Propulsion: One variable-pitch propeller
- Speed: 15 kn (28 km/h; 17 mph) at full load displacement; (80% rated power)
- Range: 6,000 nmi (11,000 km; 6,900 mi) at 12 kn (22 km/h; 14 mph)
- Complement: 8 officers, 42 enlisted
- Armament: 2 x .50 caliber machine guns, option for 1 x 25mm cannon

USCGC Elm (WLB-204) is a U.S. Coast Guard Juniper-class seagoing buoy tender home-ported in Astoria, Oregon. She is responsible for maintaining aids to navigation on the coasts of Oregon and Washington, including the Columbia River.

== Construction ==
Elm was built by the Marinette Marine Corporation on the Menominee River in Wisconsin. Elm was launched on January 24, 1998. She was the fourth of the fourteen Juniper-class ships launched. Her original cost was approximately $26 million.

Her hull is constructed of welded steel plates. She is 225 feet (69 m) long and has a beam of 46 feet (14 m). She is capable of maintaining a sustained speed of 15 knots. The ship has thirteen diesel fuel tanks capable of holding 74,498 gallons. Elm has an unrefueled range of 6,000 miles at 12 knots.

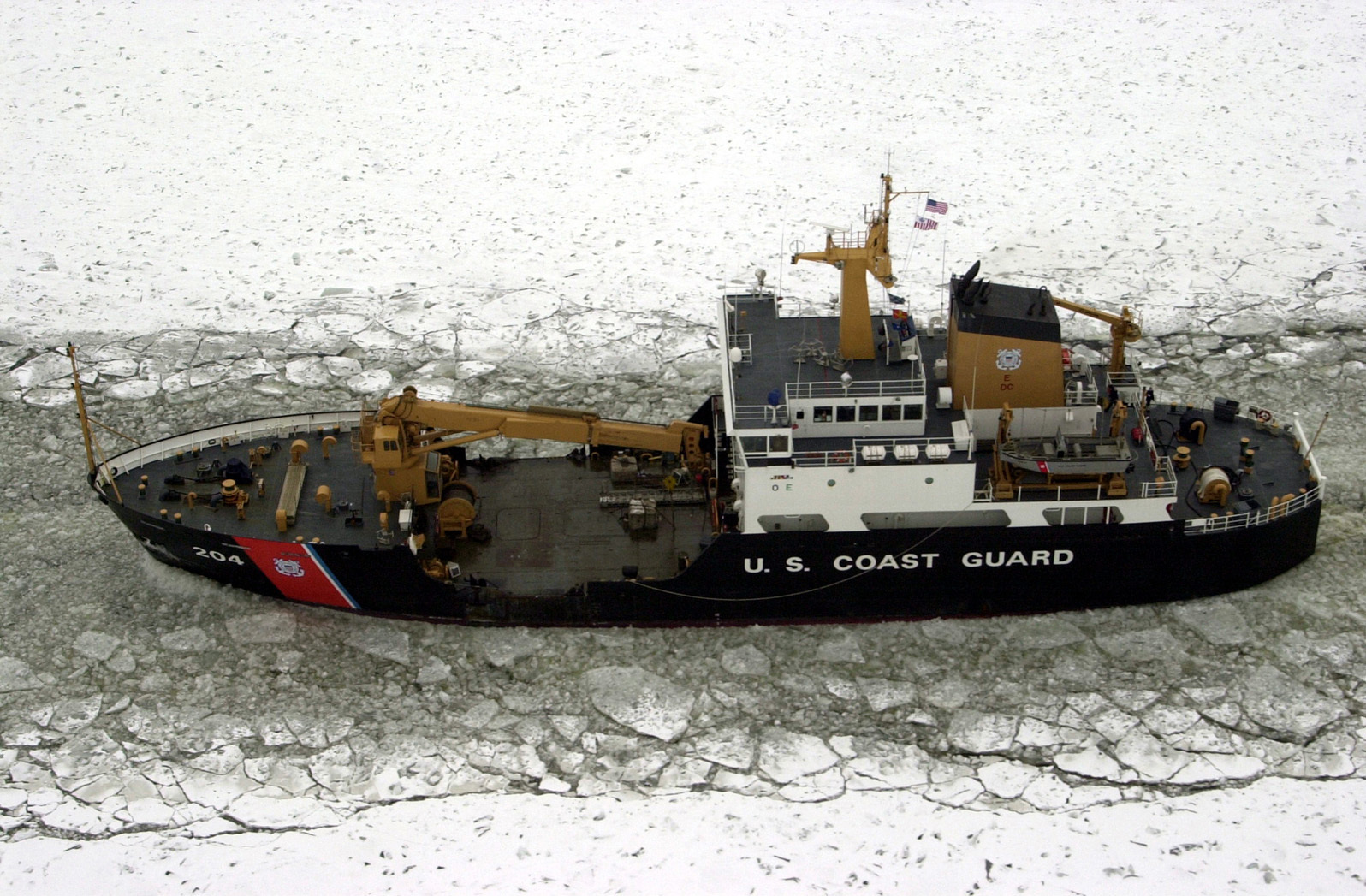
USCGC Elm icebreaking in the Hudson River

Elm has a single variable-pitch propeller that is powered by two Caterpillar 3608 Diesel engines, each with an indicated 3,100 shp. There are two electric maneuvering thrusters, the bow thruster producing 460 hp and the stern thruster producing 550 hp. The thrusters act as part of a dynamic positioning system that is capable of maintaining the ship within five meters of a fixed position on the sea in winds up to 30 knots and seas up to 8 feet (2.4 m). This allows the crew to work on buoys in difficult weather conditions.

The ship's crane extends to 60 feet (18 m) and can lift 40,000 pounds (18,000 kg) onto her buoy deck, which is 2,875 square feet in area.

Elm is capable of light icebreaking. She can sail through ice 14 inches (36 cm) thick at three knots.

Elm is armed with two 50-caliber machine guns and a variety of small arms for boarding operations.

Elm and all but one of the Juniper-class buoy tenders are named after trees. She is the third Coast Guard ship of this name. The first Elm was a derrick barge launched in 1919 to maintain aids to navigation in the Hudson River. The second USCGC Elm (WAGL-260/WLI-72260) was a buoy tender launched in 1938.

== Operational history ==
After launch and sea trials, Elm sailed down the Great Lakes and Saint Lawrence Seaway to reach her new homeport of Atlantic Beach, North Carolina. She was based at Coast Guard Station Fort Macon. Her primary mission was to maintain 250 buoys between Shark River Inlet, New Jersey and the border between North and South Carolina, including Chesapeake Bay. She supported other Coast Guard missions as well, including search and rescue, law enforcement, oil spill response, and light icebreaking.

In her search and rescue role, she extinguished a fire aboard the scallop-fishing vessel Captain O. J. Riggs in 2009. Elm was dispatched to search for survivors of the replica HMS Bounty which was sunk by Hurricane Sandy in 2012.

In her law enforcement role, Elm participated in repatriating Cubans attempting to reach the United States in 2007.

Elm served as an icebreaker in the Hudson River and Chesapeake Bay.

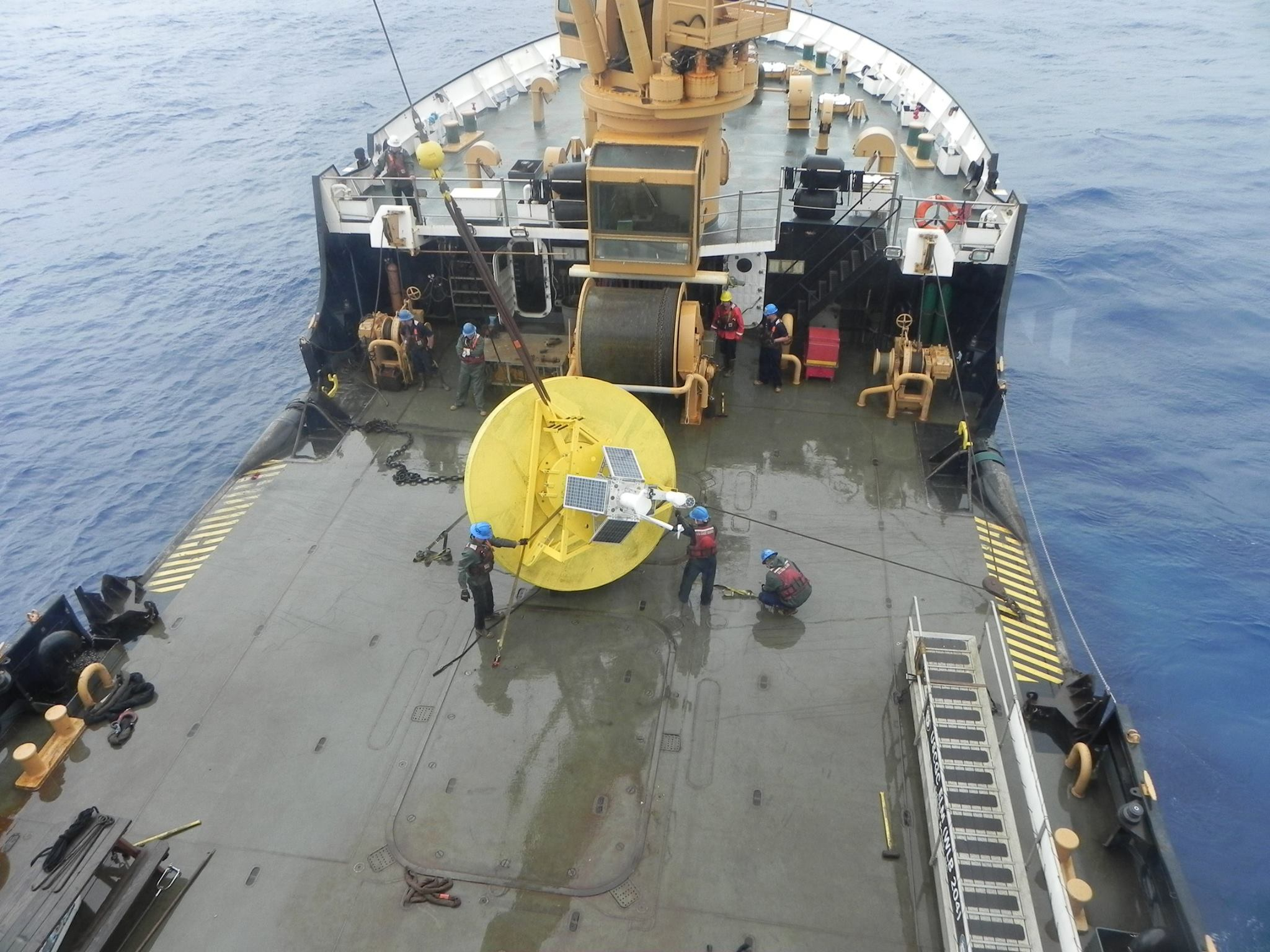
USCGC Elm recovers a NOAA weather buoy adrift in the Atlantic

The Deepwater Horizon drilling platform exploded in the Gulf of Mexico in April 2010. In May Elm was deployed to assist in the oil spill response, using her Spilled Oil Recovery System. She succeeded in skimming more than 500,000 gallons of oil during her six-month deployment, more than any other Coast Guard cutter.

Elm was one of the ships that participated in Fleet Week celebrations at Port Everglades in 2006.

In January 2018 Elm went into drydock at the Coast Guard Yard in Baltimore for a mid-life major overhaul. She left the yard on June 13, 2019. On July 15, 2019 Elm reached her new homeport, Astoria, Oregon, replacing Fir, which sailed for Baltimore for her own mid-life overhaul in June 2018. Fir's crew, already familiar with the operating area, took over Elm.

In her new role, Elm is responsible for maintaining 131 floating buoys on the coasts of Oregon and Washington from the California border north to the Strait of Juan de Fuca, and in the Columbia River east to Longview, Washington. She is stationed at Coast Guard Base Tongue Point. In the spring of 2022, Elm also supported aids to navigation in Northern California, covering for USCGC Alder which sailed to the Coast Guard Yard for its own mid-life overhaul.

Elm has cooperated with NOAA to maintain weather buoys on several occasions in the Atlantic, Caribbean, and Pacific.
