= Allen L. Seaman =

United States Navy officer and Navy Cross recipient

Allen Lang Seaman
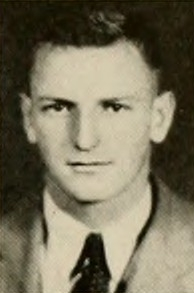
- 1936 Duke yearbook photo
- Born: 21 December 1916; New Haven, Connecticut, US
- Died: 1 May 1944 (aged 27); New Guinea
- Military career
- Allegiance: United States
- Branch: United States Navy
- Service years: 1938–1944
- Rank: Lieutenant Commander
- Awards: Navy Cross (2)

Allen Lang Seaman was born on 21 December 1916 at New Haven, Connecticut, and educated at Duke University. He enlisted in the United States Naval Reserve on 15 August 1938 and was ordered to Naval Air Station Pensacola as an Aviation Cadet five months later. Designated a Naval Aviator on 19 October 1939, he was commissioned Ensign in the Naval Reserve on 24 November.

After service in several patrol squadrons, he was assigned to a bomber squadron in May 1943. He flew many missions including long range reconnaissance and bombing missions in support of major task force strikes in October 1943 against Wake Island, for which he was awarded the Air Medal, and missions in support of the Allied thrust toward Hollandia, New Guinea, in April 1944, for which he was awarded the Distinguished Flying Cross.

Appointed Lieutenant Commander on 15 April 1944, Seaman was declared missing in action on 1 May 1944 after inflicting substantial damage on enemy land and sea forces in the New Guinea area despite damage to his own aircraft. For that action and for his judgment and skill in crash landing his plane in such a manner as to save several members of his crew, he was awarded the Navy Cross. Declared dead as of 1 May 1944, he was also awarded, posthumously, a 5/16 inch star in lieu of a second Navy Cross for the skill, leadership, and courage he consistently showed in pressing home, with great accuracy, low level strikes against enemy installations and shipping in the New Guinea area from November 1943 to March 1944.

== Namesake ==
In 1946, the destroyer Seaman (DD-791) was named in his honor.
