= USCGC Fir (WLB-213) =

U.S. Coast Guard seagoing buoy tender

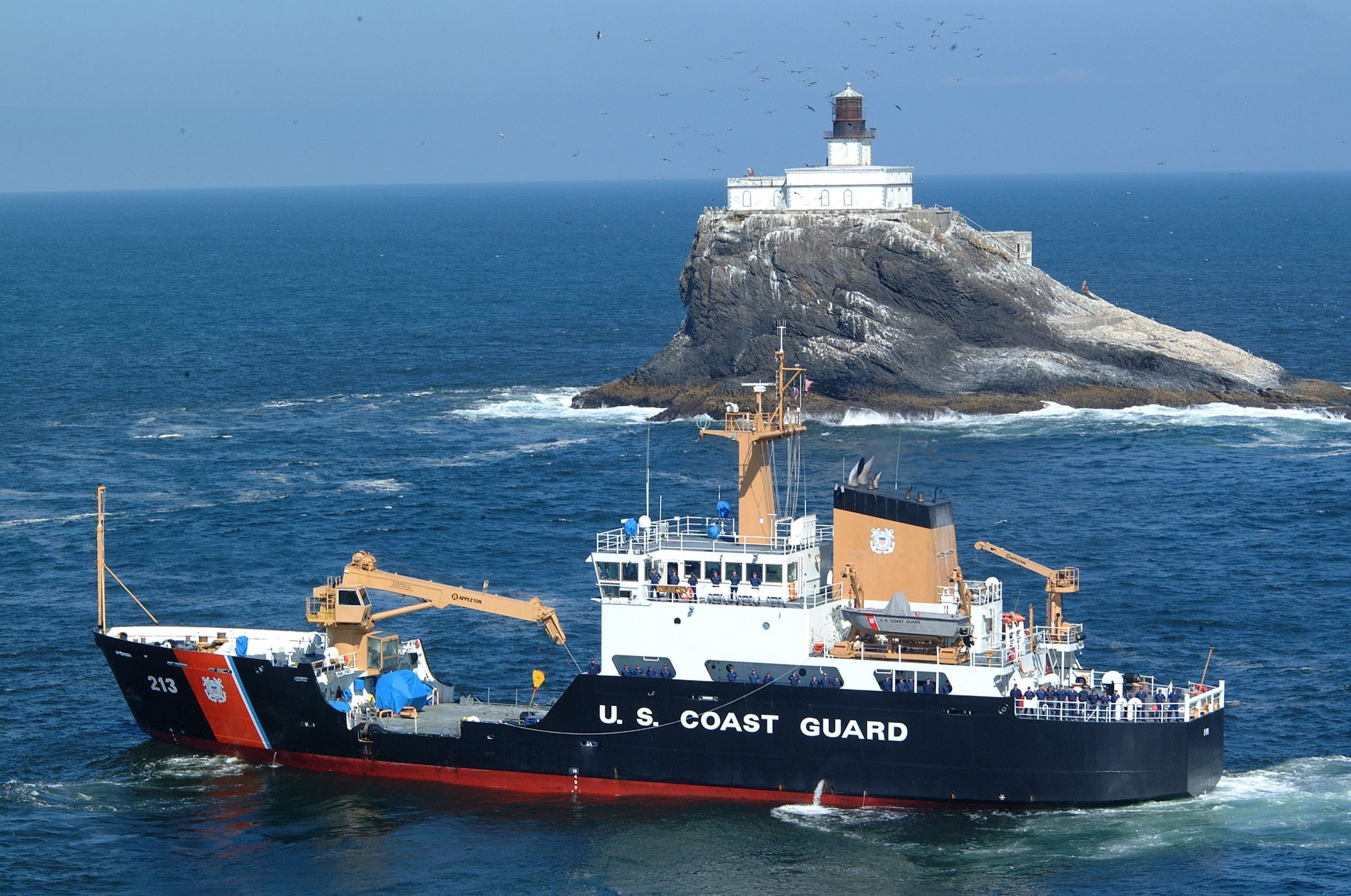
- USCGC Fir (WLB-213) passing Tillamook Rock Light, Oregon coast.

History

United States
- Name: USCGC Fir (WLB-213)
- Builder: Marinette Marine Corporation, Marinette, Wisconsin, U.S.
- Launched: 18 August 2003
- Commissioned: 8 November 2003
- Home port: Cordova, Alaska, U.S.
- Identification: IMO number: 9259977; MMSI number: 369915000; Callsign: NAYV
- Motto: "Keeper of the Sound"
- Status: in active service
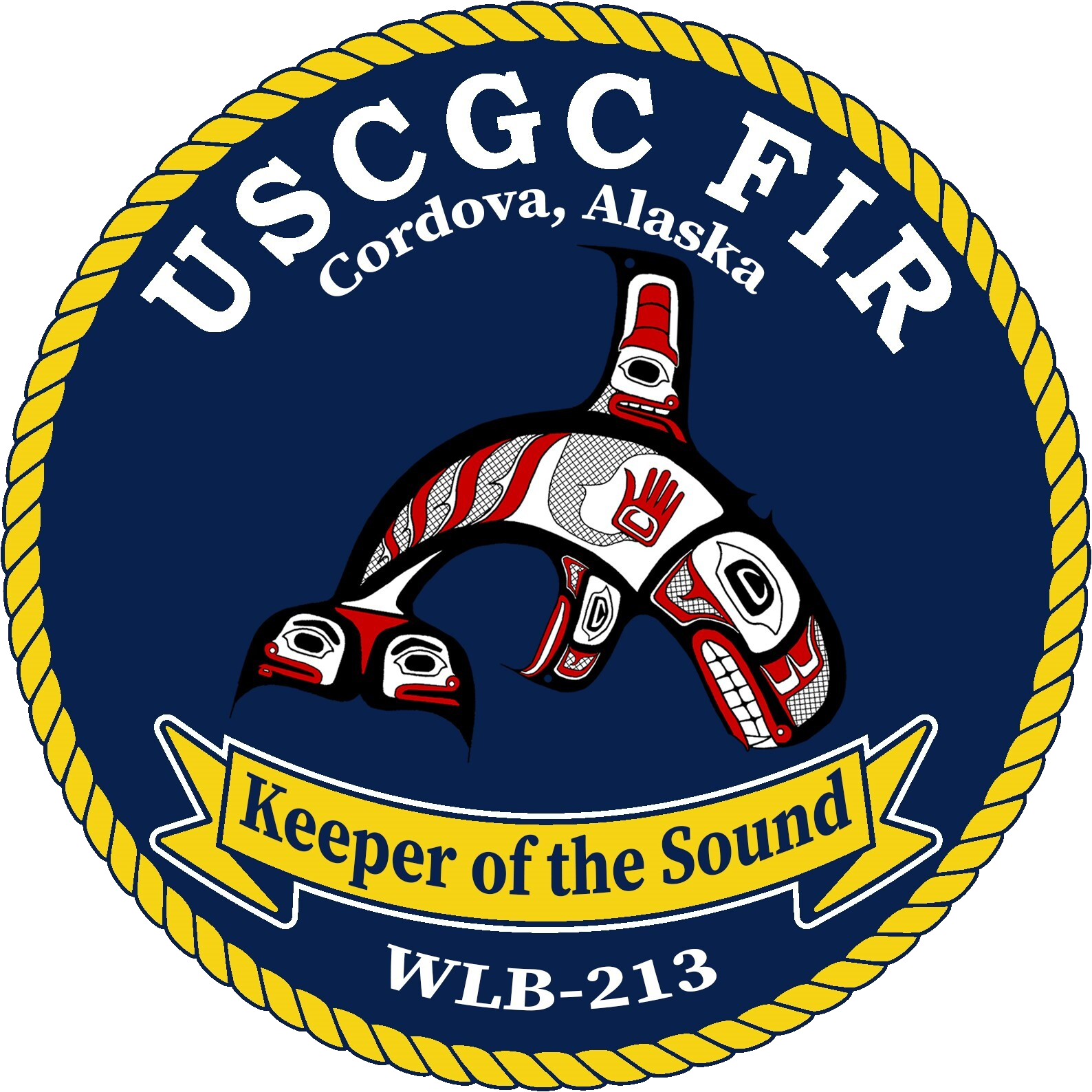
- Badge

General characteristics
- Class & type: Juniper-class seagoing buoy tender
- Type: Buoy tender
- Displacement: 2,000 long tons (2,000 t) full load
- Length: 225 ft (69 m)
- Beam: 46 ft (14 m)
- Draft: 13 ft (4.0 m)
- Propulsion: 2 × Caterpillar 3608 diesel; marine engines; 3,100 shp (2,300 kW); 10 ft (3.0 m) controllable-pitch propeller
- Speed: 15 kn (28 km/h; 17 mph) at full load displacement; (80% rated power)
- Range: 6,000 nmi (11,000 km; 6,900 mi) at 12 kn (22 km/h; 14 mph)
- Boats & landing craft carried: 1 UTL & 1 RHI
- Complement: 7 officers, 41 enlisted
- Armament: 2 x .50 caliber heavy machine guns

USCGC Fir (WLB-213) is a Juniper-class cutter of the United States Coast Guard. USCGC Fir is under the Operational Control (OPCON) of the Commander of the Seventeenth Coast Guard District and is homeported in Cordova, Alaska. Fir's primary mission is to service and maintain 132 aids to navigation around the Gulf of Alaska. The buoys USCGC Fir maintains are essential to commercial vessel traffic in major shipping ports of the Prince William Sound such as Valdez, Cordova, as well as across the Gulf of Alaska in Yakutat. USCGC Fir conducts heavy lift aids to navigation operations, law enforcement and other missions as directed.

== Construction and characteristics ==
USCGC Fir was built by the Marinette Marine Corporation in Wisconsin, launched on 18 August 2003 and commissioned on 8 November 2003. She has a length of 225 ft (69 m), a beam of 46 ft (14 m), and a draft of 13 ft (4.0 m). Fir is propelled by two Caterpillar diesel engines rated at 3,100 horsepower, and has a top speed of 16 knots. She has a single controllable-pitch propeller, which along with bow and stern thrusters, allow the ship to be maneuvered to set buoys close offshore and in restricted waters. A dynamic global positioning system coupled with machinery plant controls and a chart display and information system allow station-keeping of the ship with an accuracy of within five meters of the planned position without human intervention. Fir is also equipped with an oil-skimming system known as the Spilled Oil Recovery System (SORS), which is used in her mission of maritime environmental protection. The cutter has a 2,875 square foot buoy deck area with a crane that is used for servicing large ocean buoys.

Fir is equipped with a dynamic positioning system that utilizes a bow thruster, stern thruster and the ship's controllable pitch propeller to hold the ship's position and heading at the push of a button. The dynamic positioning system relies on inputs from the Differential Global Positioning System. In dynamic positioning mode the ship can be driven with a joystick from several locations on the bridge, and from a mobile ship control console.

The ship recently converted all of its lighted aids to navigation from incandescent to LED lights. Fir is the first unit in the U.S. Coast Guard to do so.

As a heavy lift platform Fir has a 20-ton hydraulic crane, a chain in-haul system and 4 heavy cross-deck winches. Fir carries two small boats; a cutter boat large (CB-L), specifically designed for law enforcement, and a C.G. Standard Utility Boat (UTL).

Fir is armed with several .50 caliber heavy machine guns, M240 light machine guns, and other small arms for law enforcement and defense operations. In accordance with United States and international law, Fir is considered an American warship.

== Missions ==
Several times per year, the USCGC Fir deploys jointly with members of the National Data Buoy Center (NDBC) branch of the National Oceanic and Atmospheric Administration (NOAA) to deploy and service weather buoys in the Pacific Ocean. Coastal weather buoys are critical for accurate weather forecasting, and greatly benefit both the commercial shipping and fishing industries along the Northwest coast.

Like all Coast Guard cutters, the USCGC Fir does more than just one mission. The USCGC Fir spends approximately one month per year engaged in fisheries law enforcement off Gulf of Alaska and Bering Sea.

== History ==
Fir is named after one of the original lighthouse tenders built for the Lighthouse Service to resupply lighthouses and lightships, and to service buoys. The original USCGC Fir (WLM-212) was built by the Moore Drydock Company in Oakland, California in 1939. After serving as a truly multi-mission platform, adapting to the changing missions of the Coast Guard for over 50 years, Fir was decommissioned in 1991.

In May 2009, Fir was on scene commander for a plane crash in the Columbia River. An experimental plane flying from Astoria to Seattle suffered engine failure and ditched in the Columbia River in the vicinity of the 17th Street Pier where Fir and USCGC Steadfast were moored. Working with a local salvage crew, Fir recovered the airplane. Both passengers were rescued by the Columbia River Bar Pilots.

From June to October 2010, Fir was deployed to the Gulf of Mexico for Operation Deepwater Horizon. In total, eight of the Coast Guard's sixteen Juniper-class buoy tenders were deployed to the Gulf of Mexico for the nation's largest ever oil spill to conduct oil skimming operations, command and control and public relations. Coast Guard cutters Aspen, Elm, Oak, Walnut, Juniper, Sycamore, Cypress and Fir were involved in skimming and other contingency operations.

== Awards and honors ==
US Coast Guard E Ribbon for the period of 7 February to 4 March 2005, at Fleet Training Group (FTG) San Diego California.

US Coast Guard E Ribbon for the period of 29 October to 16 November 2007, at Fleet Training Group (FTG) San Diego California.

US Coast Guard E Ribbon for the period of 4 February 2012 to 19 November 2014, at Afloat Training Organization (ATO) Everett, Washington.

== See also ==
- USCG seagoing buoy tender

== Notes ==
Citations

References used

- "225-foot Seagoing Buoy Tender (WLB)". Cutters, Craft & U.S. Coast Guard-Manned Army & Navy Vessels. U.S. Coast Guard Historian's Office.
- "Characteristics". CGC Fir (WLB-213). U.S. Coast Guard.
- "History". CGC Fir (WLB-213). U.S. Coast Guard.
- "Marinette Marine Corp., Marinette WI". Index to U.S. Shipbuilders and Boatbuilders. shipbuildinghistory.com website. Archived from the original on 7 December 2011.
