= USS Welles (DD-628) =

Gleaves-class destroyer

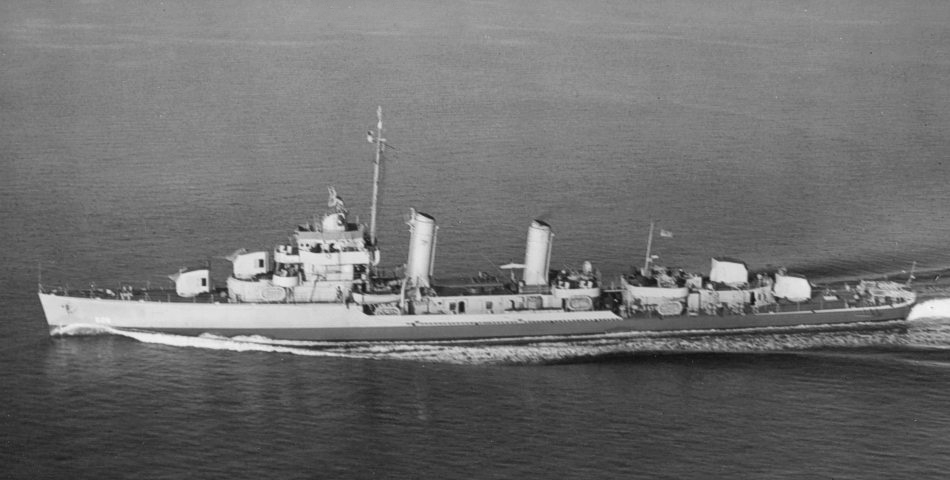
- USS Welles (DD-628) underway off Port Townsend, Washington, on 10 November 1943.

History

United States
- Name: Welles
- Namesake: Gideon Welles
- Builder: Seattle-Tacoma Shipbuilding Corporation
- Laid down: 27 September 1941
- Launched: 7 September 1942
- Commissioned: 16 August 1943
- Decommissioned: 4 February 1946
- Stricken: 10 February 1968
- Fate: Sold for scrapping, 18 July 1969

General characteristics
- Class & type: Gleaves-class destroyer
- Displacement: 1,630 tons
- Length: 348 ft 3 in (106.15 m)
- Beam: 36 ft 1 in (11.00 m)
- Draft: 11 ft 10 in (3.61 m)
- Propulsion: 50,000 shp (37,000 kW); 4 boilers; 2 propellers
- Speed: 37.4 knots (69 km/h)
- Range: 6,500 nmi (12,000 km; 7,500 mi) at 12 kn (22 km/h; 14 mph)
- Complement: 16 officers, 260 enlisted
- Armament: 4 × 5 in (127 mm)/38 caliber DP guns; 4 × 40 mm (1.6 in) AA guns; 7 × 20 mm (0.79 in) AA guns, 5 × 21 in (533 mm) torpedo tubes (5 Mark 15 torpedoes); 6 × depth charge projectors, 2 × depth charge tracks

USS Welles (DD-628), a Gleaves-class destroyer, was the second ship of the United States Navy to be named for Gideon Welles.

Welles was laid down on 27 September 1941 at Seattle, Washington, by the Seattle-Tacoma Shipbuilding Corp. and launched on 7 September 1942; sponsored by Mrs. Suzanne Dudley Welles Brainard. The ship was commissioned on 16 August 1943.

== Service history ==
Following shakedown training along the west coast of the United States, Welles returned to Puget Sound on 26 October. After post-shakedown availability there, she got underway on 15 November in company with two British escort carriers which she escorted as far as San Diego, California. Continuing on her way, the destroyer transited the Panama Canal on 28 November and set a course for New York. She stopped along the way at Norfolk and, upon her arrival at New York on 4 December, joined Destroyer Division 38 (DesDiv 38). Ordered farther north, the warship departed New York on 26 December and arrived in Boston harbor the following day. On the 28th, she and her division mates got underway for the western Pacific in the screen of the battleship New Jersey. The task unit stopped briefly at Norfolk where New Jersey's sister battleship, Iowa, joined it for the voyage to the Pacific. The unit transited the Panama Canal during the first week in January 1944 and continued its voyage west on 8 January.

=== Southwest Pacific Area ===
Welles and her traveling companions arrived at Funafuti in the Ellice Islands on 21 January and remained there for a week before getting underway for New Guinea. The destroyer arrived at Milne Bay on 5 February and joined the U.S. 7th Fleet. Later in the month, she escorted a convoy of LSTs to Cape Gloucester on the island of New Britain. On 29 February, Welles provided gunfire support for elements of the Army's 1st Cavalry Division then landing on Los Negros Island in the Admiralties. During that operation, the destroyer came under fire from enemy automatic weapons and at least one field gun but sustained no damage. After completing her portion of the mission, she moved out to the transport area to provide antisubmarine defense. Periodically, she returned close to shore to provide all fire for American troops fighting ashore.

In March, she returned south to the area around Buna to prepare for operations to capture the remainder of the northern coast of New Guinea. During the Hollandia assault, the first of five leap frog steps to the Vogelkop, Welles was assigned to Task Group 77.2 (TG 77.2), the Central Attack Group which mounted its assault at Humboldt Bay on 22 April. About a month later, on 18 May, she supported the landings at Wakde Island and at Sarmi on the New Guinea mainland. From there, the warship continued with General Douglas MacArthur's amphibious jump to Biak Island where she provided gunfire support during the landings and consolidation operations from 27 May to 2 June. During that time, she destroyed several Japanese barges, harassed enemy ground forces, silenced a shore battery or two and helped to repel several air attacks.

Leaving Biak on 2 June, the warship screened logistics convoys along the New Guinea coast for about a month before arriving off Noemfoor Island, located just west of Biak, to support the capture of that island. At the end of July, she participated in the last amphibious operation in New Guinea when troops went ashore at Cape Sansapor on the Vogelkop.

She returned to Aitape early in August and then moved from there down the coast to Finschhafen whence she departed on 23 August, bound for the Solomon Islands. Welles arrived at Florida Island on 6 August and became a unit of the U.S. 3rd Fleet. She immediately plunged into preparations for the impending Palau attack. For the assault on Peleliu and Angaur, the destroyer initially screened the carriers providing air support. After the mid-September landings on the two islands, she was detached from the carriers and moved into the transport area to provide antisubmarine defense and to guard against any attempts to reinforce the two islands. At the conclusion of her participation in the Palau operation, she joined TG 77.2 and began preparations for the invasion of the Philippines at Leyte.

=== Western Pacific ===
She moved into Leyte Gulf on 18 October, two days before the actual landings, to cover preinvasion minesweeping and underwater demolition team operations. Her 5-inch (127 mm) shells also contributed to the preinvasion bombardment of the objective. After the 20 October landings, the warship delivered call fire in support of the troops advancing ashore and defended the invasion fleet against the heavy enemy air attacks launched against it. In the latter role, she claimed one unassisted kill. When the Japanese launched their three-pronged surface attack to break up the Leyte assault, Welles joined the screen of Vice Admiral Jesse B. Oldendorf's line of old battleships which virtually annihilated the enemy force which attempted to push through the Surigao Strait south of Leyte on the night of 24/25 October. Soon thereafter, she concluded her part in the Philippine operation and retired to Ulithi Atoll where she joined the screen of the Fast Carrier Task Force.

For the remainder of her participation in the war Welles cruised with either the fast carriers or with their logistics unit as the flattops launched air strikes on Japan's inner defenses and supported from a distance the invasions at Luzon, Iwo Jima, and Okinawa.

In June 1945, she retired to Leyte for rest and upkeep. On the 21st of that month, she received orders to return to the United States for a major overhaul. Steaming via Eniwetok and Oahu, the destroyer arrived in Bremerton, Washington on 16 July. She remained there through the end of hostilities in August and until late September.

On 29 September, she got underway for the east coast. After a stop at San Pedro Harbor, she transited the Panama Canal on 14 October and headed for New York where she arrived on 20 October. In November, the ship moved south to Charleston, South Carolina, where she was placed out of commission on 4 February 1946. Welles was berthed with the Charleston Group, Atlantic Reserve Fleet, until 10 February 1968 at which time her name was struck from the Navy list. On 18 July 1969, she was sold to the Union Minerals and Alloy Co. for scrapping.

Welles earned eight battle stars during World War II.
