= USS Tinian =

Commencement Bay-class escort carrier of the US Navy

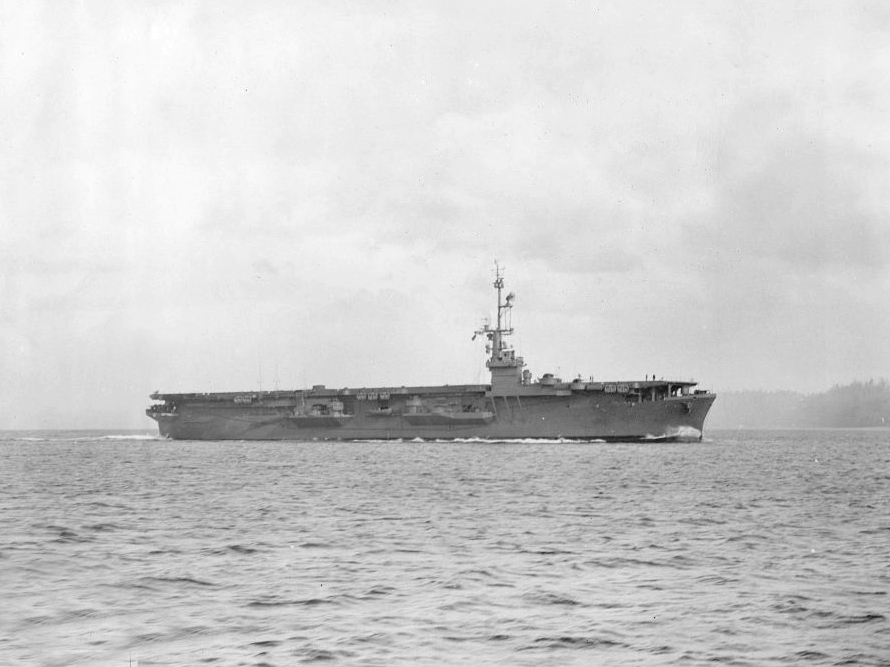
- USS Tinian steaming to join the reserve fleet on 21 February 1946

History

United States
- Name: USS Tinian
- Namesake: Battle of Tinian
- Builder: Todd Pacific Shipyards
- Laid down: 20 March 1945
- Launched: 5 September 1945
- Acquired: 30 July 1946
- Stricken: 1 June 1970
- Fate: Sold for scrapping, 15 December 1971

General characteristics
- Class & type: Commencement Bay-class escort carrier
- Displacement: 21,397 long tons (21,740 t)
- Length: 557 ft 1 in (169.80 m) loa
- Beam: 75 ft (23 m)
- Draft: 32 ft (9.8 m)
- Installed power: 16,000 shp (12,000 kW); 4 × boilers
- Propulsion: 2 × Steam turbines; 2 × screw propellers
- Speed: 19 knots (35 km/h; 22 mph)
- Complement: 1,066
- Armament: 2 × 5 in (127 mm) dual-purpose guns; 36 × 40 mm (1.6 in) Bofors AA guns; 20 × 20 mm (0.8 in) Oerlikon AA guns
- Aircraft carried: 33
- Aviation facilities: 2 × aircraft catapults

USS Tinian was a Commencement Bay-class escort carrier of the United States Navy. The Commencement Bay class were built during World War II, and were an improvement over the earlier Sangamon class, which were converted from oil tankers. They were capable of carrying an air group of 33 planes and were armed with an anti-aircraft battery of 5 in (127 mm), 40 mm (1.6 in), and 20 mm (0.8 in) guns. The ships were capable of a top speed of 19 knots (35 km/h; 22 mph), and due to their origin as tankers, had extensive fuel storage.

Ordered and constructed during World War II, Tinian never entered active service and was assigned to the Pacific Reserve Fleet, Tacoma after being completed. In June 1955, the ship was reclassified a helicopter carrier and in May 1959, a cargo ship and aircraft ferry. The ship remained in reserve for her entire career and was struck from the Naval Vessel Register on 1 June 1970 and sold for scrap.

== Design ==
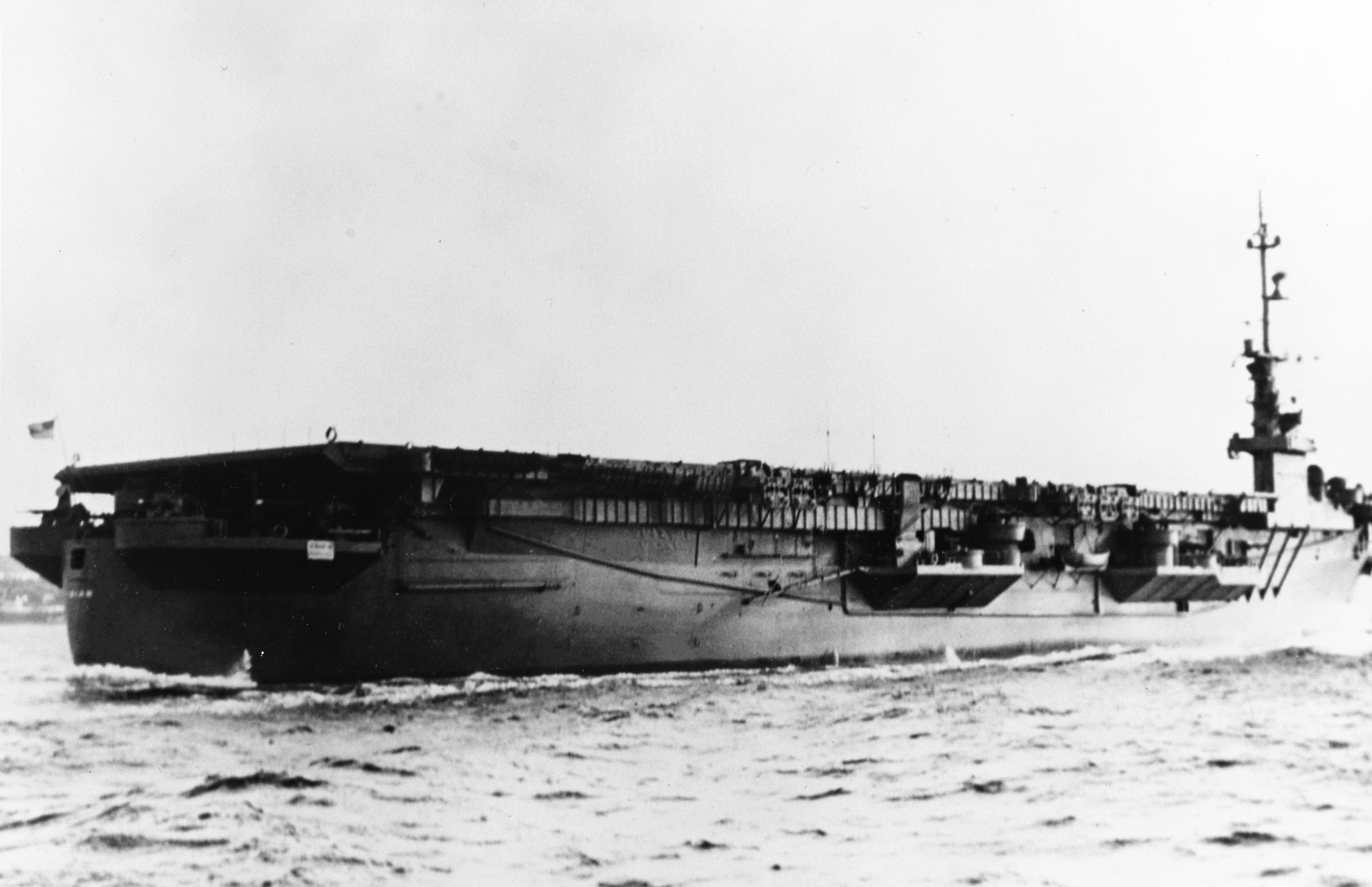
Tinian during sea trials in 1946

In 1941, as United States participation in World War II became increasingly likely, the US Navy embarked on a construction program for escort carriers, which were converted from transport ships of various types. Many of the escort carrier types were converted from C3-type transports, but the Sangamon-class escort carriers were instead rebuilt oil tankers. These proved to be very successful ships, and the Commencement Bay class, authorized for Fiscal Year 1944, were an improved version of the Sangamon design. The new ships were faster, had improved aviation facilities, and had better internal compartmentation. They proved to be the most successful of the escort carriers, and the only class to be retained in active service after the war, since they were large enough to operate newer aircraft.

Tinian was 557 ft 1 in (169.80 m) long overall, with a beam of 75 ft (23 m) at the waterline, which extended to 105 ft 2 in (32.05 m) at maximum. She displaced 21,397 long tons (21,740 t) at full load, of which 12,876 long tons (13,083 t) could be fuel oil (though some of her storage tanks were converted to permanently store seawater for ballast), and at full load she had a draft of 27 ft 11 in (8.51 m). The ship's superstructure consisted of a small island. She had a complement of 1,066 officers and enlisted men.

The ship was powered by two Allis-Chalmers geared steam turbines, each driving one screw propeller, using steam provided by four Combustion Engineering-manufactured water-tube boilers. The propulsion system was rated to produce a total of 16,000 shp (12,000 kW) for a top speed of 19 knots (35 km/h; 22 mph). Given the very large storage capacity for oil, the ships of the Commencement Bay class could steam for some 23,900 nautical miles (44,300 km; 27,500 mi) at a speed of 15 knots (28 km/h; 17 mph).

Her defensive anti-aircraft armament consisted of two 5 in (127 mm) dual-purpose guns in single mounts, thirty-six 40 mm (2 in) Bofors guns, and twenty 20 mm (1 in) Oerlikon light AA cannons. The Bofors guns were placed in three quadruple and twelve twin mounts, while the Oerlikon guns were all mounted individually. She carried 33 planes, which could be launched from two aircraft catapults. Two elevators transferred aircraft from the hangar to the flight deck.

== Service history ==
The first fifteen ships of the Commencement Bay class were ordered on 23 January 1943, allocated to Fiscal Year 1944. Tinian, named for the eponymous island captured by US forces in July 1944, was built by the Todd-Pacific Shipyards in Tacoma, Washington. Her keel was laid down on 20 March 1945 and her completed hull was launched on 5 September, after the end of World War II. She was completed in mid-1946 and was accepted by the US Navy on 30 July. The ship was not commissioned, and was instead assigned to the Pacific Reserve Fleet, based in Tacoma. Ten of the Commencement Bay-class ships saw significant service postwar as anti-submarine warfare (ASW) carriers, but they were small and had difficulty operating the new Grumman AF Guardian patrol planes, so the rest of the class remained laid up, and they were soon replaced in the ASW role by much larger Essex-class aircraft carriers.

She was reclassified as an escort helicopter carrier on 12 June 1955, with the hull number CVHE-123. In early June 1958 Tinian was taken in tow at Tacoma, Washington, by the US Navy MSTS tugboat USNS Yuma, destined for San Diego, California. While very near the Swiftsure Bank lightship, Neah Bay, Washington; at the entrance of the Strait of Juan de Fuca, Yuma developed engine troubles. Yuma's distress call brought USCGC Fir to her rescue. The crew of the Swiftsure lightship went to general quarters, ready to assist. Fir then escorted Yuma and Tinian to safety. Tinian arrived at the South Tee Pier in San Diego on 9 June.

The ship was reclassified again in May 1959, now as a cargo ship and aircraft ferry with the hull number AKV-23. She remained in the Navy's inventory, part of the San Diego Group of the Reserve Fleet, until she was struck from the naval register on 1 June 1970. She was eventually sold for scrap to the Levin Metals Company of San Jose, California on 15 December 1971.
