= USS Seaman =

U.S. Navy Gearing-class destroyer

History

United States
- Name: Seaman
- Namesake: Allen L. Seaman
- Builder: Seattle-Tacoma Shipbuilding Corporation, Seattle, Washington
- Laid down: 10 July 1945
- Launched: 29 May 1946
- Commissioned: Not commissioned
- Stricken: 1 March 1961
- Fate: Sold for scrap, 12 September 1961

General characteristics
- Class & type: Gearing-class destroyer
- Displacement: 3,460 long tons (3,516 t) full
- Length: 390 ft 6 in (119.02 m)
- Beam: 40 ft 10 in (12.45 m)
- Draft: 14 ft 4 in (4.37 m)
- Propulsion: Geared turbines, 2 shafts, 60,000 shp (45 MW)
- Speed: 35 knots (65 km/h; 40 mph)
- Range: 4,500 nmi (8,300 km) at 20 kn (37 km/h; 23 mph)
- Complement: 336
- Armament: 6 × 5"/38 caliber guns; 12 × 40 mm AA guns; 11 × 20 mm AA guns; 10 × 21 inch (533 mm) torpedo tubes; 6 × depth charge projectors; 2 × depth charge tracks

Seaman (DD-791) was a Gearing-class destroyer of the United States Navy, named for Lieutenant Commander Allen L. Seaman (1916–1944), a naval aviator who was awarded two Navy Crosses for service in the Pacific War.

Seaman was laid down on 10 July 1945 by the Seattle-Tacoma Shipbuilding Corporation, Seattle, Washington; launched on 29 May 1946; sponsored by Mrs. Barbara K. Seaman, widow of Lt. Comdr. Seaman; and delivered, partially complete, on 25 June 1946 to the officer-in-charge of demobilized shipping for the 13th Naval District.

Never commissioned, the destroyer was subsequently placed in the Bremerton Group of the Pacific Reserve Fleet, where she remained until struck from the Navy list on 1 March 1961. Her hulk was sold to the First Steel and Ship Corp., New York City, on 12 September 1961, and was delivered to the Learner Co., Alameda, California, on 22 September 1961 for scrapping.
