= USS Frederick Funston =

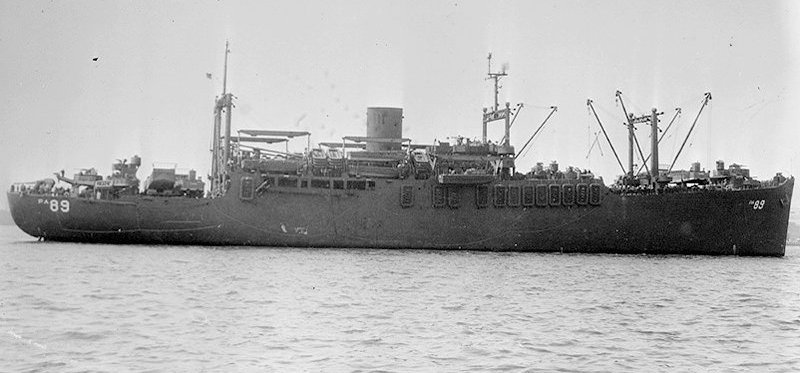
- USS Frederick Funston (APA-89)

History

United States
- Name: USS Frederick Funston (APA-89)
- Namesake: General Frederick Funston
- Builder: Seattle-Tacoma Shipbuilding
- Launched: 27 September 1941
- Sponsored by: Miss Barbara E. Funston
- Acquired: (by the Navy) 8 April 1943
- Commissioned: 24 April 1943
- Decommissioned: N/A
- Reclassified: To T-AP-178 (date unknown)
- Stricken: N/A
- Honours and awards: Six battle stars for World War II service, one for the Korean War
- Fate: Scrapped, 1969

General characteristics
- Class & type: Frederick Funston-class attack transport
- Displacement: 7,000 tons (lt)
- Length: 492 ft
- Beam: 69 ft 6 in
- Draft: 26 ft 6 in
- Propulsion: Geared Turbine Drive, 2 × Babcock & Wilcox header-type boilers, single propeller, designed shaft horsepower 8,000
- Speed: 16 knots
- Capacity: Troops: 2,200
- Complement: 576
- Armament: 1 × 5"/38-caliber dual-purpose gun mount, 2 × 3"/50 cal. dual-purpose gun mounts, eight 1.1"/75-caliber guns, replaced by 16 × 20 mm gun mounts
- Notes: MCV Hull No. ?, hull type C3-S-A1

USS Frederick Funston (APA-89) was a Frederick Funston-class attack transport that served with the US Navy during World War II. Before serving as a Navy APA, she had been the US Army transport USAT Frederick Funston. After World War II, she was returned to the Army and operated as USAT Frederick Funston. Funston was among the seventy-two ships transferred to the Navy's Military Sea Transportation Service (MSTS) in the 1 March 1950 group and placed in service as USNS Frederick Funston (T-AP-178).

Named after US Army General Frederick Funston a Medal of Honor recipient, the ship was launched 27 September 1941 by Seattle-Tacoma Shipbuilding Corporation at Tacoma, Washington, and acquired by the US Army as a transport ship. She was acquired from the Army by the US Navy on 8 April 1943, reclassified an APA (Auxiliary Personnel Attack, i.e. attack transport), and commissioned 24 April 1943.

== Operational history ==
=== World War II ===
From -TROOPSHIPS OF WORLD WAR II BY ROLAND W. CHARLES -NAVAL ARCHITECT – APRIL 1947

The USAT Frederick Funston (AP-48), the first of the two Funston Class army transport ships, was built under a Maritime Commission contract for the War Department. The ship's construction was based on a special design prepared by the firm of Gibbs and Cox to meet requirements of the War Department and the U.S. Army. The ship, named in honor of the late Major General Frederick Funston, was christened at the Seattle Tacoma Shipyards, by his daughter Miss Barbara Funston, on 27 September 1941 and was delivered to the Army at Seattle on 28 October 1942.

The Funston went from Seattle to San Francisco, from where she sailed in mid-December, via Honolulu, for Guadalcanal. She also visited Espiritu Santo before returning home. From San Francisco again in February 1943, she went to Brisbane, Australia. From Brisbane the ship sailed, via the Panama Canal, to New York arriving there in early April.

At New York, following major renovations, the Funston was transferred to and commissioned by the U.S. Navy on 8 April 1943 as "Attack Transport" Frederick Funston (APA-89). She went to Norfolk for training and was in operation in the Atlantic (with trips to Oran, Naples, Belfast, the Clyde, etc.) until she returned to New York on 30 December 1943. (see Mediterranean Theater below)

In February she sailed, via Davisville, Rhode Island, where she loaded men of the Naval Construction Battalions to Norfolk, Virginia and then to Panama, thence to Pearl Harbor, arriving at Honolulu 16 March 1944. From then until the end of the war, she was locally operated by the Navy. (see Pacific Theatre below)

The Funston left Honolulu on 9 July 1945 and went to Eniwetok and Guam before returning to San Francisco. She sailed from the latter port for Manila in September and returned to Los Angeles on 31 October and then made a trip to Manus Island and returned to San Francisco in December. Her next voyage took her to Guam, the Marianna's and Saipan. The Frederick Funston returned to Los Angeles, and from there went to San Francisco, where she was redelivered to the Army in Early April 1946. In June 1946 crew quarters on the vessel were altered for accommodating War Department peacetime civilian crew and guns and Attack Transport equipment (Welin Davits) removed. (see After Hostilities below)

==== Mediterranean Theatre ====
===== Invasion of Sicily =====
Frederick Funston sailed from Norfolk, Virginia 8 June 1943 for rehearsal landings on the coast of Algeria, and on 10 July arrived off the assault beaches of Sicily to land the Third Battalion of the 180th Infantry Regiment successfully through heavy surf. Three days later she sailed to train at Oran for the assault on Salerno, off which she lay from 8 to 10 September landing soldiers.

===== Invasion of Salerno =====
The transport returned to North Africa to load reinforcements whom she landed at Salerno on 22 and 23 September, then made three voyages from Oran to Naples carrying Army service troops, engineers, and rangers. On 30 November, she cleared Oran for Northern Ireland with paratroopers on board, and after disembarking them, sailed on to New York, arriving 31 December 1943.

==== Pacific Theatre ====
===== Invasion of Saipan =====
After loading men of naval construction battalions at Davisville, Rhode Island, Frederick Funston sailed for the Pacific, arriving at Honolulu 16 March 1944. Here she landed the Seabees and embarked Marines for the invasion of Saipan, landing them in the initial assault 15 June. After a week off the beaches offloading cargo and taking casualties on board, she returned to Honolulu. Here the casualties were transferred to hospitals, and soldiers taken on board with whom she reinforced Guam on 24 July.

===== Invasion of Leyte =====
During August, the transport joined in training operations in the Hawaiian Islands, then crossed to Manus, from which she sailed 14 October for the invasion of Leyte. She landed her troops and cargo on 21 October, the day after the initial assault, and the following day cleared for Aitape, New Guinea, to embark reinforcements. These were put ashore at Leyte 14 November.

===== Invasion of Luzon =====
Training off New Guinea and in Huon Gulf prepared Frederick Funston for the initial landings on Luzon of 9 January 1945. That night a watchful lookout spotted and shot a suicide swimmer only 50 yards from the ship.

===== Invasion of Iwo Jima =====
Completing her unloading the next day, Frederick Funston sailed by way of Leyte and Ulithi to Guam to embark Marines for the assault on Iwo Jima. With her troops held in reserve, she did not land them until 27 February, although she lay off the island throughout the assault. She returned to Guam with casualties 8 March, then replaced her landing craft at Guadalcanal and exercised at Nouméa through April. She returned to the west coast for overhaul in May 1945

===== After hostilities =====
Frederick Funston reached the Philippines 3 October for inter-island transport duty until 8 December when she returned to San Francisco. Another voyage was made to carry occupation troops to the Marianas and return veterans to the United States between 22 December and 7 February 1946.

She was decommissioned and returned to the Army 4 April 1946.

=== Second Navy commission ===
After serving with the Army Transportation Corps Fleet out of Seattle, Frederick Funston returned to naval custody when the Military Sea Transportation Service was formed in 1950, and was placed in noncommissioned status for operations with a Civil Service crew, after which she saw some service in the Korean War.

The ship was scrapped in 1969.

=== Awards ===
Frederick Funston received six battle stars for World War II. service and one for the Korean War.
