= USS Yuma (AT-94) =

Cherokee-class fleet tug

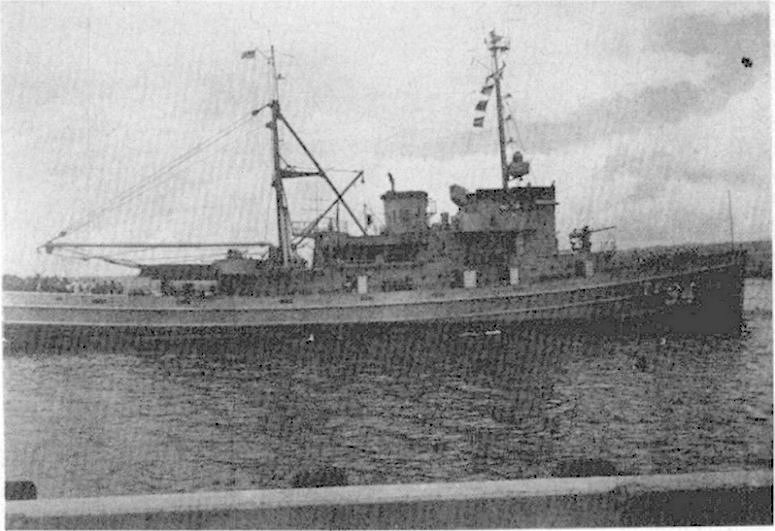
- Yuma underway in the Aleutian Islands

History

United States
- Name: USS Yuma
- Namesake: the Yuma Native American tribe
- Builder: Commercial Iron Works; Portland, Oregon
- Laid down: 13 February 1943
- Launched: 17 July 1943
- Commissioned: AT-94, 31 August 1943
- Out of service: 11 March 1959
- Reclassified: (ATF-94), 15 May 1944; USNS Yuma (T-ATF-94), 17 January 1958
- Stricken: 25 March 1959
- Honors and awards: Battle stars; World War II (2); Korean War (2)
- Fate: Transferred to Pakistan, 25 March 1959

Pakistan
- Name: PNS Madadgar
- Acquired: 25 March 1959
- Decommissioned: 1993
- Identification: A-234
- Fate: Unknown

General characteristics
- Class & type: Navajo-class fleet tug
- Displacement: 1,235 long tons (1,255 t)
- Length: 205 ft (62.5 m)
- Beam: 38 ft 6 in (11.7 m)
- Draft: 15 ft 4 in (4.7 m)
- Propulsion: Diesel-electric, four General Motors 12-278A diesel main engines driving four General Electric generators and three General Motors 3-268A auxiliary services engines, single screw, 3,600 shp (2,685 kW)
- Speed: 16 knots (30 km/h)
- Complement: 85
- Armament: 1 × single 3 in (76 mm) dual purpose gun mount; 2 × twin 40 mm AA gun mounts; 2 × single 20 mm guns AA gun mounts

USS Yuma (AT-94/ATF-94/T-ATF-94) was a Navajo-class fleet tugboat constructed for the United States Navy during World War II. She was the second U.S. Navy ship named for the Yuma tribe of Arizona.

Yuma was laid down in February 1943, launched in July 1943, and commissioned in August 1943. She was 205 feet (62.5 m) in length, 38 feet 6 inches (11.7 m) abeam, and displaced 1,235 long tons (1,255 t). She was armed with a single 3-inch (76 mm) gun and four anti-aircraft guns of smaller calibers.

Yuma served in the Pacific Ocean during World War II and earned two battle stars. After the war she remained in service in the Far East through 1949. After a one-year stint on the West Coast, Yuma returned to the Pacific and served in the combat zone of the Korean War in 1951 and 1952, earning two battle stars for her service. She alternated between operating out of Pearl Harbor, Guam, Japan, and the Aleutians over the next three years. After her 1955 return to the west coast, Yuma was decommissioned.

In 1958, Yuma was transferred to the Military Sea Transportation Service and placed in service as USNS Yuma (T-ATF-94). After a short period of west coast operations, Yuma steamed to Karachi, Pakistan, where she was taken out of service. She was stricken from the Naval Vessel Register in March 1959, she was turned over to Pakistan on loan for operation as the Pakistan Navy ship PNS Madadgar (A-234). Her ultimate fate is unknown.

== World War II ==
Yuma was laid down on 13 February 1943 at Portland, Oregon, by the Commercial Iron Works; launched on 17 July 1943; sponsored by Mrs W. J. Jones; and commissioned on 31 August 1943, LT W. R. J. Hayes, USN, Commanding. She underwent shakedown in September 1943 and about 10 weeks of operations along the west coast. The tugboat then departed San Francisco, California on 12 December 1943, bound for the southwestern Pacific.

She arrived at Melbourne, Australia, on 1 February 1944 and operated in Australian waters for the next three months; visiting the ports of Sydney, Fremantle, and Brisbane as a unit of the U.S. 7th Fleet. At the end of April 1944, the ship was reassigned to the U.S. 3rd Fleet and moved to Nouméa, New Caledonia. On 4 June 1944, she returned to the 7th Fleet at Milne Bay, New Guinea, to prepare for the landings on Noemfoor Island and at Cape Sansapor, both of which she supported in July 1944. In August 1944, she was underway to the South Pacific for duty in the Solomon and New Hebrides Islands. That assignment lasted until February 1945 when she headed for the Marianas and service in support of the U.S. 5th Fleet.

She arrived at Saipan on 11 February 1945 and remained there until sailing for the invasion of the Ryūkyūs assigned to the Western Islands Attack Group, Task Group (TG) 51.1, during the third week in March 1945. Attached to the force to conquer Kerama Retto for use as a forward base, she moved into that anchorage almost a week before the initial assault on Okinawa on 1 April 1945 and remained there until mid-May, supporting the forces afloat around the island. She towed several battle-damaged and kamikaze-crashed ships to safety. One of these vessels, USS Hinsdale, was crashed into by a kamikaze on 1 April 1945 during a feigned landing operation along the island's southern coast.

At mid-May 1945, the fleet tugboat concluded her six-week tour of duty at the Okinawa inferno and set course, via Guam, for Ulithi where she arrived on 24 May 1945. On 7 June 1945, she stood out of Ulithi for a month of duty at Leyte which ended on 18 July 1945 and departed for the Marshalls. She arrived at Eniwetok on 24 July 1945 and remained until the beginning of the second week in September 1934. She then sailed to the Philippines for occupation duty in Japan.

== Post-war operations ==
Arriving in Tokyo Bay on 18 September 1945, she provided support services for American forces in Japan until the first week in April 1946. On 5 April 1946, the tug left Japan, bound for Hawaii. She arrived at Oahu on 18 April 1945 and remained there until 26 August 1946, when she headed back to the Far East. She arrived in Yokosuka, Japan, on 10 September 1946 and resumed duty with American occupation forces in Asia. Over the next six months, she provided towing services in Japan, Korea, the Philippines, China, and the Ryūkyūs.

Yuma left the Far East again in May 1947, departing from Samar in the Philippines. She stopped at Pearl Harbor briefly in June 1947 and continued on to San Francisco, California, where she arrived on 10 June 1947. In July 1947, the tug voyaged to Pearl Harbor before returning to the west coast at Puget Sound on 28 July 1947. From that time until February 1948, she operated along the western coast of the United States, visiting ports in Washington, Oregon, and California.

Late in February 1948, she sailed to Pearl Harbor and thence proceeded to the Aleutian Islands where she operated until late August 1948. In September 1948, she steamed to Qingdao, China, making one round-trip run between Qingdao and Yokosuka before departing the former port, bound for Oahu on 29 November 1948. The tug entered port at Pearl Harbor on 27 December 1948 and remained there until 7 January 1949 at which time she got underway to return to the west coast. She spent February and March 1949 engaged in normal west coast operations and in April 1949 returned to the Aleutians where she served until late August 1949. The tug resumed duty along the California coast upon her arrival in San Francisco on 27 August 1949. In December, she made a round-trip voyage to Pearl Harbor and back to the west coast.

On 9 February 1950, Yuma departed San Diego, California, for Oahu and arrived in Pearl Harbor ten days later. After almost two months of duty at Pearl Harbor, the tugboat got underway on 10 April 1950 for a mission in the Pacific Trust Territories. Based at Guam, she performed duty at Taongi Atoll and Kusaie Island in the Carolines, at Koror in the Palaus, and at Saipan. On 9 July 1950, she departed Guam and, four days later, arrived in Yokosuka, Japan.

== Korean War operations ==
That move, however, did not presage her early participation in the war which had broken out in Korea just two weeks earlier for, after visits to Sasebo in Japan and to Subic Bay in the Philippines, she returned to Guam on 2 August 1950 and resumed duty in the Pacific Trust Territories for another year. During that 12-month period, she visited Japanese ports and, no doubt, performed missions in distant support for the United Nations forces fighting in Korea. She also made several voyages to Pearl Harbor and operated at various islands—notably Kwajalein, Eniwetok, and Guam in the Trust Territories. In September 1951, she returned to Japan, arriving at Sasebo on 17 September 1951. With that arrival, Yuma began her seven months of duty in the combat zone. She made numerous voyages between Japanese ports and Wonsan, Korea, in support of the troops and ships fighting in and around Korea. On 10 October 1951, with USS Reclaimer, she towed the British Royal Navy hospital ship RFA Maine which had lost a propeller, on a westward passage through the crowded and narrow Shimonoseki Straits. This was the only hospital ship supporting UN Forces at that time.

She concluded her brief interlude with the Korean War on 22 April 1952 when she departed Sasebo, bound for Pearl Harbor. She arrived in Oahu on 5 May 1952 and, for most of the year, made voyages from Pearl Harbor to Eniwetok and Kwajalein in the Marshall Islands in support of Operation Ivy in progress there. She completed that service in November 1952, returning to Pearl Harbor on 21 November 1952. In January and February 1954, she operated at Midway Island with USS Current during the salvage of a grounded civilian ship, SS Quartette. Following overhaul at Pearl Harbor during early to mid-1954, she returned to the Aleutians once more for duty and, for the next 18 months, alternated between Alaskan and Hawaiian waters.

== Later career ==
In February 1955, the tugboat returned to the west coast where she operated until decommissioned on 11 November 1955. Yuma was berthed at Astoria, Oregon, until 17 January 1958 at which time she was placed in service as USNS Yuma (T-ATF-94) and assigned to the Military Sea Transportation Service (MSTS). She cruised the coasts of Washington, Oregon, and California for most of the year. In early June 1958 the escort carrier USS Tinian was taken in tow at Tacoma, Washington, by Yuma; destined for San Diego, California. While very near the Swiftsure Bank lightship, Neah Bay, Washington; at the entrance of the Strait of Juan de Fuca, Yuma developed engine troubles. Yuma's distress call brought USCGC Fir to her rescue. The crew of the Swiftsure lightship went to general quarters, ready to assist. USCGC Fir then escorted Yuma and Tinian to safety. On 9 June 1958 Yuma arrived in San Diego, California with Tinian. On 3 December 1959, she departed Astoria, Oregon and headed—via Pearl Harbor and Midway Island for the Far East. She arrived at Yokosuka Japan, on 16 January 1959, at Hong Kong on 3 February 1959, Singapore on 20 February 1959, Ceylon on 27 February 1959, Bombay on 7 March 1959, and finally at Karachi, Pakistan, on 11 March 1959.

There, she was placed out of service and turned over to Pakistan on loan. She was struck from the Naval Vessel Register, 25 March 1959. On that day, she was transferred to Pakistan and renamed PNS Madadgar (A-234), where she served until decommissioned in 1993.
