= USCGC Fir (WLM-212) =

Lighthouse tender

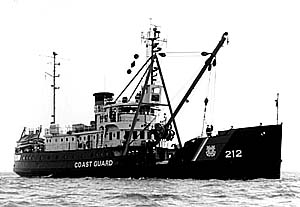

History

United States
- Namesake: Fir
- Operator: United States Lighthouse Service; United States Coast Guard
- Builder: Moore Dry Dock Company, Oakland, California
- Cost: US$389,746
- Yard number: Hull number 194
- Laid down: 7 January 1939
- Launched: 18 May 1939
- Sponsored by: Miss Harriet Birta Mason
- Christened: 18 May 1939
- Commissioned: 1 October 1940 (USCG)
- Decommissioned: 1 October 1991
- Maiden voyage: 18 August 1939 to Portland, Oregon
- Reclassified: WLM (1965)
- Home port: Seattle, Washington
- Identification: Hull number: WAGL-212; MMSI number: 369289000; Callsign: WDJ6681
- Nickname(s): Mother Fir, Building 212
- Honors and awards: Queen of the Fleet 30 May 1988
- Fate: Scrapped at Alang India
- Notes: Call sign NRYR

General characteristics
- Class & type: Hollyhock class, type A
- Type: Coast Guard, Auxiliary, General, Lighthouse tender WAGL; Coastal Buoy tender, WLM
- Displacement: 885 tons.
- Length: 174 ft 8 1/2 in (53.251 m)
- Beam: 32 ft (9.8 m)
- Draft: 11 ft 3 in (3.43 m)
- Ice class: Reinforced bow and stern. Ice-belt at water-line, notched forefoot.
- Installed power: Original: 2 triple-expansion steam, horizontal engines; 2 oil-fired Babcock & Wilcox watertube boilers; Diesel conversion: (1951); 2 four-cylinder Fairbanks-Morse 38D 8-1/8; 2 Detroit Diesel 100kW generators
- Propulsion: Twin screws; 1,000 shp (750 kW) (steam); 1,350 shp (1,010 kW) (diesel)
- Speed: 12 knots (22 km/h; 14 mph)
- Range: 2,000 mi (3,200 km)
- Complement: 4 officers, 1 warrant officer, 69 enlisted (1945)
- Crew: 74 (1945).
- Sensors & processing systems: Radar: SO-1 (1945); CS (1966). Sonar: WEA-2 (1945); UNQ-1 (1966)
- Armament: 1 × 3-inch gun; 2 × 20mm/80 single-mount cannons; M2 Browning machine gun; 2 × depth charge tracks (1945); M60 Machine guns were added in 1957
- Notes: Deck gear: boom, electrically powered, 20 ton hoisting capacity (1940); replaced in 1982 with hydraulic boom and A-frame system with a 15 ton hoisting capacity
- USCGC Fir
- U.S. National Register of Historic Places
- U.S. National Historic Landmark
- Location: As of 2017: Stockton, California.
- Built: 1939
- NRHP reference No.: 92001880

Significant dates
- Added to NRHP: 27 April 1992
- Designated NHL: 27 April 1992

The United States Coast Guard Cutter Fir (WAGL/WLM 212) was the last lighthouse tender built specifically for the United States Lighthouse Service to resupply lighthouses and lightships, and to service buoys. Fir was built by the Moore Drydock Company in Oakland, California in 1939. On 22 March 1939, the U.S. Lighthouse Tender Fir was launched. She was steam driven with twin screws, 175 feet (53 m) in length, had a beam of 32 feet (9.8 m), drew 11 feet 3 inches (3.43 m) of water, and displaced 885 tons. Fir was fitted with a reinforced bow and stern, and an ice-belt at her water-line for icebreaking. She was built with classic lines and her spaces were lavishly appointed with mahogany, teak, and brass. The crew did intricate ropework throughout the ship. The cost to build Fir was approximately US$390,000. Fir's homeport was Seattle, Washington for all but one of her fifty one years of service when she was temporarily assigned to Long Beach, California when USCGC Walnut was decommissioned on 1 July 1982.

On 1 July 1939 the United States Lighthouse Service became a part of the United States Coast Guard. On 1 October 1940 Fir was commissioned as the United States Coast Guard Cutter Fir (WAGL-212). With the onset of World War II Fir was assigned to the U.S. Department of the Navy and painted battleship grey. The following armament was installed for war service: M2 Browning machine guns, a 3-inch gun, and depth charges. Her wartime duties included picket duty, towing gunnery targets, and patrolling the Washington and Oregon coasts. In 1965, Fir was reclassified as a USCG coastal buoy tender (WLM).

On 27 May 1988, after the decommissioning of USCGC Ingham, Fir gained the distinction as the U.S. Coast Guard's oldest commissioned cutter. In accordance with a Coast Guard custom, she displayed gold hull numbers on her bow and was designated as "Queen of the Fleet" on 30 May 1988. On 1 October 1990, the 200th anniversary year of the U.S. Coast Guard, Fir was honored again with the celebration on her 50th birthday. One year later, on 1 October 1991 Fir was decommissioned, and; on 27 April 1992 was designated a National Historic Landmark by the United States Secretary of the Interior.

During her career, Fir was a multi-mission ship whose accomplishments mirrored the changing American maritime scene, and the needs of the U.S. Coast Guard for more than half a century. Fir's primary duties included resupplying coal, potable water, food, and other vital provisions; icebreaking, aids to navigation (ATON) maintenance, delivery and pick-up of U.S. Mail for lightships and lighthouses on the Washington and Oregon coasts. Fir tended the lightships at Umatilla Reef off La Push, Washington and Swiftsure Bank at the entrance of the Strait of Juan de Fuca Washington. In addition to servicing aids to navigation (ATON), Fir stood war duties during World War II, performed search and rescue missions, marine environmental protection, and law enforcement. For her last project, Fir was tasked to do what she was originally built for in 1939. In July 1991, Fir renovated and restored the Cape Flattery Lighthouse on Tatoosh Island at the entrance to the Strait of Juan de Fuca.

There is successor cutter also named Fir, USCGC Fir (WLB-213), currently in active use by the Coast Guard, which is a 225-foot (69 m) cutter. She was launched in 2003 and is based in Astoria, Oregon. She was eventually scrapped at Alang India in 2026.

== History ==
Fir was launched in the United States Lighthouse Service, but completed under the U.S. Coast Guard, making her the last United States Lighthouse Service tender constructed. Sea trials were held on San Francisco Bay on 17 August 1939. The Trial Board consisted of R. R. Tinkham, Chief Lighthouse Engineer, Portland, Oregon; W. C. Dibrell, Superintendent of Lighthouses, Ketchikan, Alaska with F. C. Hingsburg, Superintendent of Lighthouses, Portland, Oregon, acting as his alternate; and F. H. Conant, Assistant Lighthouse Engineer, San Francisco, California. On 18 August 1939, Fir departed for Portland, Oregon. On 30 December 1939, she received orders to proceed to Lake Union, Seattle, Washington. She was commissioned as the U.S. Coast Guard Cutter Fir (WAGL-212) on 1 October 1940. On 4 November 1949 Fir rescued 19 persons from MV Andalucia off Neah Bay, Washington. In 1954 Fir assisted the distressed SS Beloit Victory near Destruction Island, Washington.

In early June 1958 USS Tinian was taken in tow at Tacoma, Washington, by the U.S. Navy Military Sea Transportation Service's tugboat USNS Yuma, destined for San Diego. California. While very near the Swiftsure Bank lightship at the entrance of the Strait of Juan de Fuca, Yuma developed engine troubles. Yuma's distress call brought Fir to her rescue. The crew of the Swiftsure lightship went to general quarters, ready to assist. Fir then escorted Yuma and Tinian to safety. On 9 June 1958, Yuma and Tinian arrived at San Diego, California.

On 10 August 1958 Bill Muncey crashed his boat Miss Thriftway at the Seattle Seafair unlimited hydroplane races on Lake Washington. Muncey lost rudder control and collided with a USCG 40 foot patrol boat CG-40575. Both boats sunk within minutes, however all personnel involved were rescued and survived with relatively minor injuries. Assisting in the immediate rescue were: CG-40378, USCG Auxiliary Plumb Crazy and a Coast Guard Sikorsky HO4S-2G (or -3G) HH-19G helicopter. On 11 August 1958 Fir recovered both boats. CG-40575 was a total loss.

In 1959 Fir was engaged in a major search operation for a downed U.S. Navy plane in her operations area. Brief video footage of Fir can be seen in a 1961 season episode of Sea Hunt titled "Skipper". The tender is raising what appears to be a damaged Coast Guard patrol boat. In 1962 Fir salvaged a submerged U.S. Coast Guard HO4S helicopter which had crashed in her operations area. In 1968 Fir assisted in firefighting operations at Todd Shipyards in Seattle, Washington.

On 5 July 1990 Fir extinguished a rapidly burning fire in a personal craft at Shilshole Bay, Washington. An entrapped mariner was rescued and his boat was saved.

Before decommissioning in 1991, Fir was responsible for 138 lighted and unlighted buoys in the Strait of Juan de Fuca and the Puget Sound areas.

Fir was decommissioned on 1 October 1991, one year after her 50th birthday. Over 600 attendees were on hand to honor the last surviving lighthouse tender in US Coast Guard service. The oldest commissioned cutter award was presented to CDR Philip E. Sherer, USCG, commanding officer of the USCGC Storis, by Fir's commanding officer LCDR Nutting, USCG.

After decommissioning, Fir remained in Seattle, Washington for many years while efforts were made to turn her into a floating museum. When these efforts failed, she was transferred to the United States Maritime Administration (MARAD) facility, Suisun Bay, California, in 1997. Her shafts and rudder locked, she was towed 930 miles by USCGC Mariposa to San Francisco's Golden Gate where she was met by a commercial tug that towed her the rest of the way to Suisun Bay. Significant objects were removed from the vessel and stored at a U.S. Coast Guard facility in Forestville, Maryland.

On 27 April 1992 Fir was placed on the U.S. National Register of Historic Places and designated a US National Historic Landmark. She was transferred to the Liberty Maritime Museum, Sacramento, California on 30 September 2002.

In 2002, she was transferred to the Liberty Maritime Museum, and towed to the Port of Sacramento.

In 2003, Fir was towed to Rio Vista, California, where she was moored on the Sacramento River on the eastern or Sacramento County side of the river across from Rio Vista.

In November 2007, Fir was put up for sale at an asking price $95,000. The mailing address for the museum is in Sacramento, but the ship was physically located across the river from Rio Vista at 38.1498°N 121.6832°W. In May 2008, the webpage reports "Fir is sold!".

In June 2010, Fir was moored at Pier 38, San Francisco.

In 2012, Fir was owned by Curt Lind and was undergoing restoration by Thomas Young.

As of 26 May 2014, Fir is listed for sale at US$360,000.

The Fir was moved again due to a dispute at Pier 38. The Fir was listed for sale in 2016, with its location is simply listed as the "San Francisco Bay Delta, CA". That location has been confirmed to be on the Little Potato Slough at the end of Eight Mile Road near Stockton, CA.

Fir was purchased by The Lighthouse Project LLC, a Virginia group dedicated to the restoration and repurposing of aids to navigation, in spring 2017. Restoration has commenced. In 2026, the vessel was sold for scrap after its owner died and was sent to Alang India to be dismantled. Her demolition was completed in the same year.

== Awards and honors ==
- US Coast Guard Unit Commendation with Operational Distinguishing Device for the period of 21 December 1985 to 21 January 1986.
- US Coast Guard Meritorious Unit Commendation with Operational Distinguishing Device for the period of 1 January 1984 to 31 May 1987.
- American Defense Service Medal
- American Campaign Medal
- World War II Victory Medal
- National Defense Service Medal with two stars

== U.S. National Historic Landmark ==
Fir was declared a National Historic Landmark in 1992. At that time, she was to be moored in Staten Island, New York. She has been listed by the landmark program as being located in California and New York.

== Gallery ==
USCGC Fir (WLM-212)

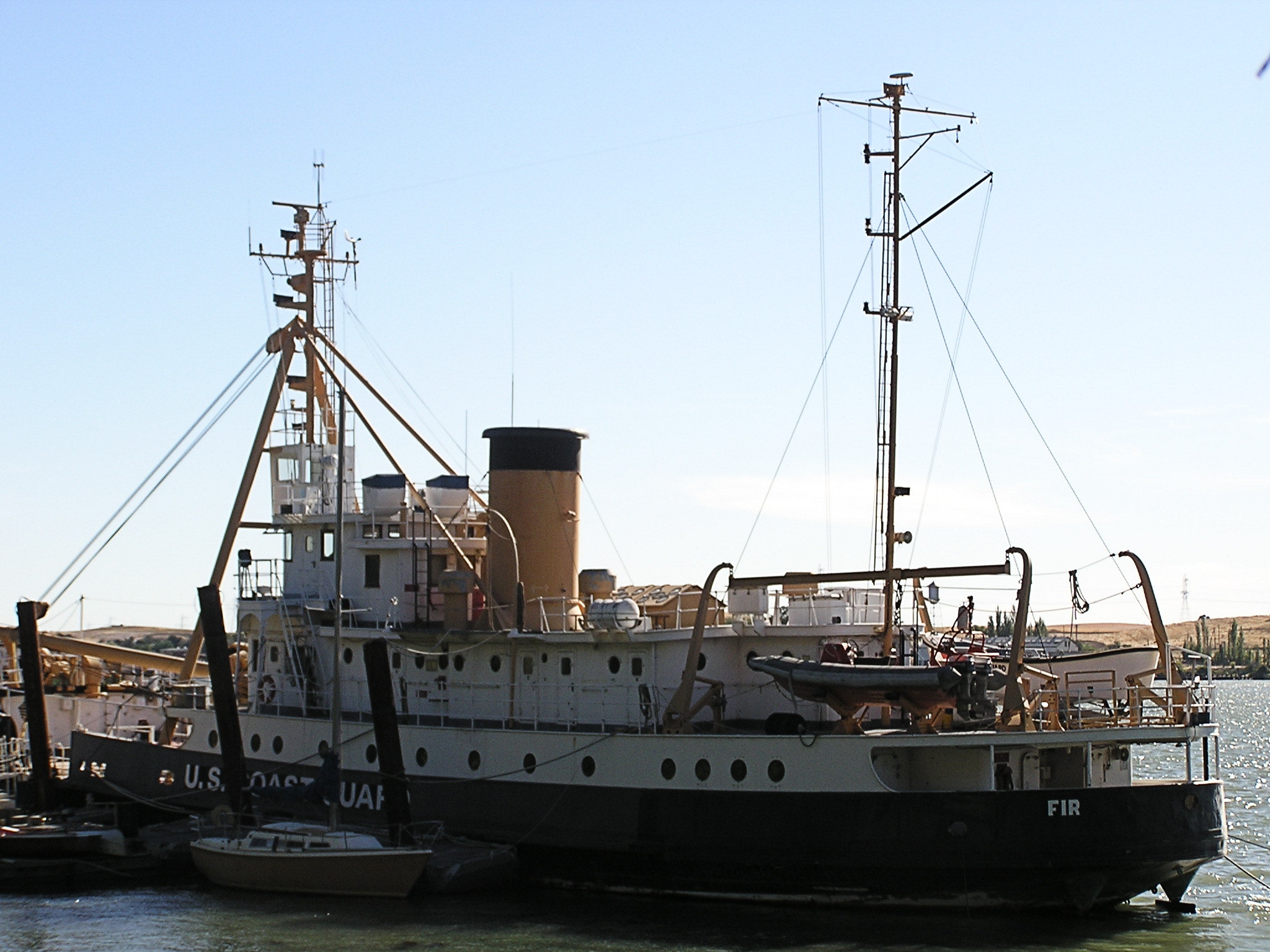
The USCGC Fir while moored in Rio Vista.

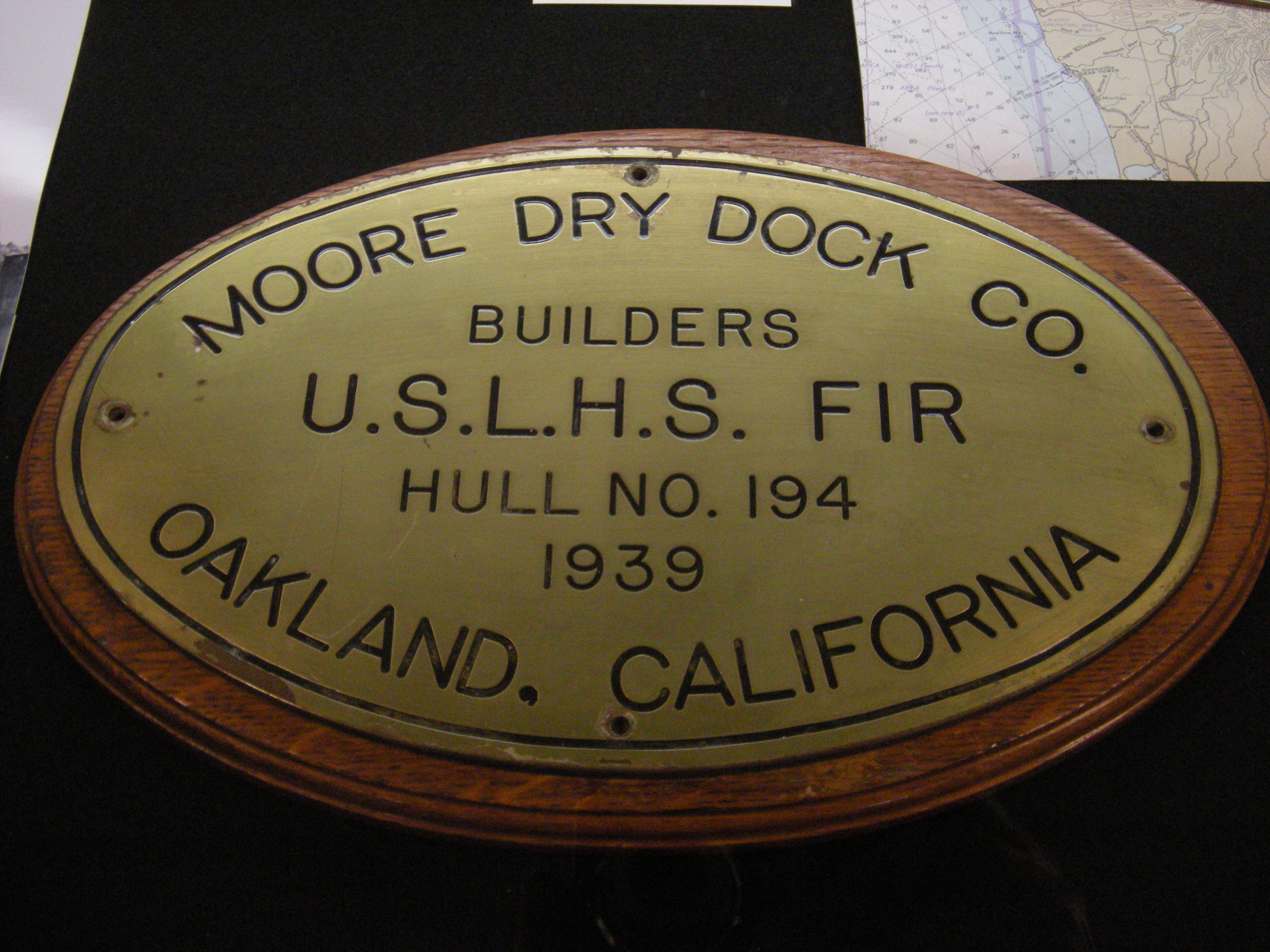
Builder's plaque

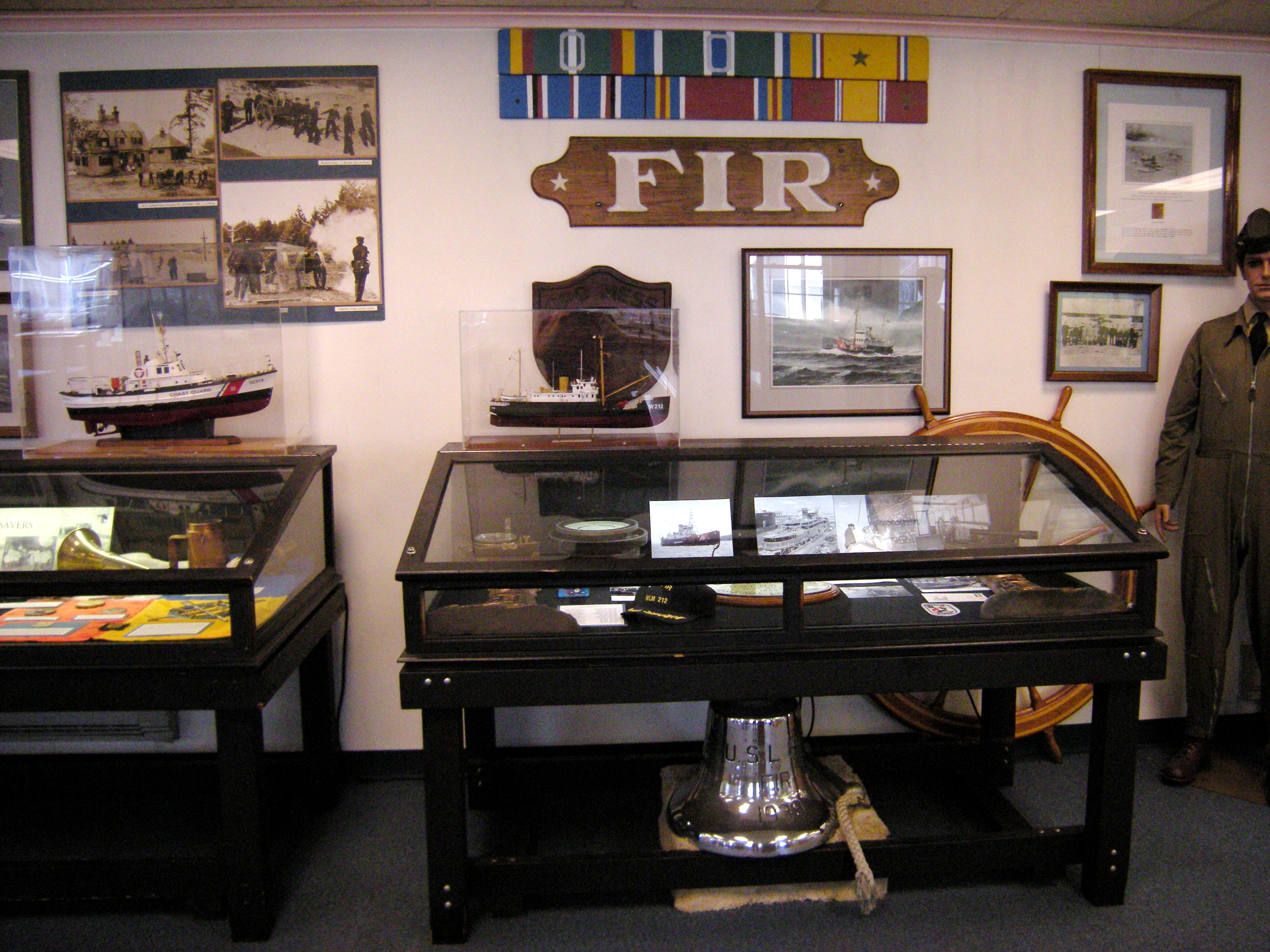
Fir exhibit at Coast Guard Museum Northwest

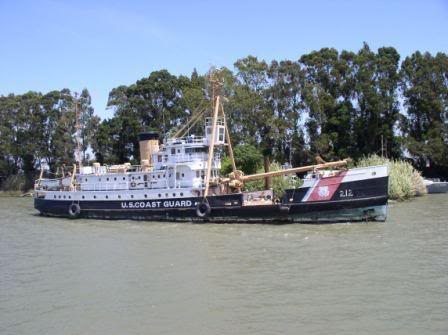
Fir after decommissioning

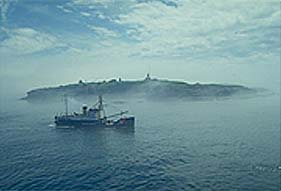
Fir at sea; Cape Flattery Light in the background.

Preceded by USCGC Ingham (WHEC-35)	United States Coast Guard "Queen of the Fleet"; 1988-1991	Succeeded by USCGC Storis (WMEC-38)
