= USLHT Elm =

History

United States Lighthouse Service
- Name: USLHT Elm
- Operator: U.S. Lighthouse Service
- Ordered: January 13, 1917
- Builder: Rice Brothers, East Boothbay, Maine
- Cost: $93,638
- Launched: July 23, 1918
- Commissioned: July 18, 1919
- Identification: Signal letters GVLJ
- Fate: Sold August 14, 1934

General characteristics
- Tonnage: 318 gross tons
- Length: 101 ft (31 m)
- Beam: 30 ft (9.1 m)
- Draft: 6.75 ft (2.06 m)
- Installed power: 150 HP 3-cylinder kerosine engine
- Propulsion: propeller
- Complement: 2 officers, 4 enlisted

USLHT Elm was a motorized derrick barge which was used to build and maintain aids to navigation. She was classed as a lighthouse tender and operated by the United States Lighthouse Service. Elm was launched in 1918 and sold in 1934.

== Construction ==
The contract for the hull was awarded to Rice Brothers Corporation in East Boothbay, Maine on January 13, 1917. The contract price was $29,400. On July 10, 1917 a fire broke out in the shipyard which destroyed all but four hull frames. Despite the setback, Elm was launched on July 23, 1918. She was placed in commission on July 19, 1919. Her total cost was $93,638.

Elm's wooden hull was 101 feet (31 m) long with a beam of 30 feet (9.1 m), and a draft of 6.75 feet (2.06 m). Her displacement at that draft was 318 tons. Elm had a single wooden deck. The ship had a single derrick mast with two booms. These were 68 feet (21 m) and 40 feet (12 m) long. The mast was located forward on deck, with the booms swinging aft. A small steam engine was used to power the crane hoists.

Propulsion was provided by a 150-horsepower kerosine-fueled internal combustion engine. This was a 2-cycle, 3-cylinder engine. The cylinders were 14 inches (36 cm) in diameter with a stroke of 18.5 inches (47 cm). This engine drove a right-handed, four-blade cast iron propeller 5.5 feet (1.7 m) in diameter.

She had accommodations for a complement of two officers and four men. There was also a spare stateroom, mess, and galley in a deck house aft on the ship. A cargo hold under the deck had a capacity of 70 tons.

== Operational history ==
Elm's first home port was Tompkinsville, on Staten Island, New York. She was assigned to the Third Lighthouse District which had its main depot at Tompkinsville. In July 1919 Elm began work improving aids to navigation in the Hudson River.

On November 9, 1922, Elm was at Block Island, Rhode Island where she damaged a dock.

In 1930 she was transferred to the Eleventh Lighthouse District and her homeport was changed to Detroit, Michigan. On August 1, 1934 the superintendent of lighthouses in Detroit took sealed bids for Elm. She was sold on August 14, 1934. Her ultimate fate is unknown.
