= SS Jacona (1918) =

First floating electric power plant

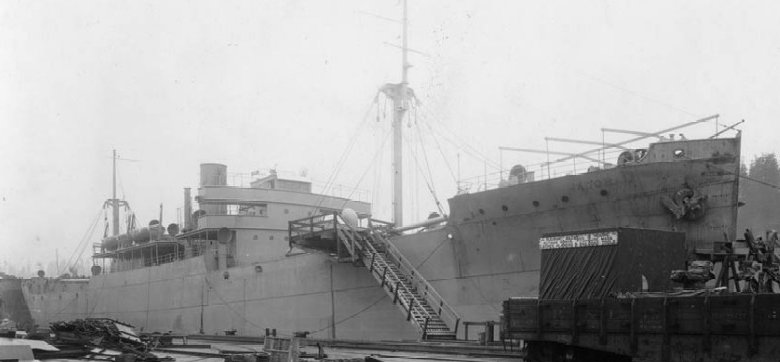
- SS Jacona in January 1919

History
- Owner: United States Shipping Board (1919 – 1930); New England Public Service Company (1930–1945); USMC/MARAD/Navy (1945–1971)
- Builder: Todd Dry Dock and Construction Company Tacoma, Washington; 1930 Conversion: Newport News Shipbuilding and Dry Dock Company, Newport News, Virginia
- Launched: November 30, 1918
- Completed: 1919
- Identification: U.S. Official Number: 217597; Signal: LPWF
- Notes: Engines removed, converted to non-self propelled floating power barge Jacona, 1930.

General characteristics
- Type: EFC Design 1014 ship
- Tonnage: 5,238 GRT, 4,024 NRT, 7,500 DWT; 4,843 GRT, 3,006 NRT (1932)
- Length: 396 ft (120.7 m) (LOA); 379 ft 4 in (115.6 m) (Navy, measurement unstated); 378.8 ft (115.5 m) (Registry)
- Beam: 53.1 ft (16.2 m)
- Draft: 23 ft 8 in (7.2 m)
- Depth: 27.0 ft (8.2 m)
- Installed power: Steam
- Propulsion: 1 x triple expansion steam engine (removed 1930)

SS Jacona was an Emergency Fleet Corporation Design 1014 cargo ship launched in 1919 for the United States Shipping Board (USSB). In the glut of shipping after World War I, the ship was laid up until selected to be converted into the first specifically designed powership.

In 1930, the ship was gutted of all existing propulsion and deck machinery and converted to a non-self-propelled barge electric generator plant with new boilers and generating sets with 20,000 kilowatt capacity to supplement generation at permanent shore generating plants. The plant was used for civilian power service in Maine and New Hampshire until March 1945 and then delivered to the War Shipping Administration.

The plant was then towed to Hawaii and used by the United States Army and Navy after World War II, supplying electric power at Hawaii, South Korea and Okinawa. In 1971, the plant was sold to buyers in the Philippines.

== Description ==
=== As built ===
Jacona was a United States Shipping Board Emergency Fleet Corporation Design 1014 ship constructed by the Todd Dry Dock and Construction Company of Tacoma, Washington. The ship was launched on November 30, 1918, and completed in April 1919. The ship is recorded with two yard hull numbers: hull 26 under the Todd Tacoma system and 112 under the Todd Seattle system. The USSB hull number for the ship was 111, similar to the Seattle yard number by coincidence.

The Design 1014 ships, including Jacona, were 7,500 DWT cargo ships driven by a triple expansion steam engine with steam from oil-fired boilers. The ship was registered with U.S. Official Number 217597, signal LPWF, at 5,238 GRT, 4,024 NRT, 378.8 ft (115.5 m) registry length, 53.1 ft (16.2 m) beam and 27.0 ft (8.2 m) depth at Seattle, Washington. Navy gives length overall as 379 ft 4 in (115.6 m) with a draft of 23 ft 8 in (7.2 m). The 1929 U.S. register shows the ship's owner as the United States Shipping Board.

The USSB-owned ship was laid up in the James River, among the many in the postwar glut of shipping, when it was selected for conversion into a mobile power plant and towed to the shipyard downriver.

=== 1930 conversion, non-self-propelled power barge ===
The novel idea for a floating mobile power plant in the form of an oceangoing ship was conceived by the president of the New England Public Service company of Augusta, Maine, Walter S. Wyman. The design engineering was done by Nepsco Services. Jacona was the world's first seagoing electric generator powership.

On April 4, 1930, the USSB entered into a contract of sale with the New England Public Service Company for the sale of Jacona for $25,000. Terms required the new owner to convert the vessel on or before April 2, 1931, into a floating power plant removing all propelling machinery, not to use in any way for transport and spending not less than $1,000,000 for the conversion. The ship was rebuilt in 1930 at the Newport News Shipbuilding and Dry Dock Company in Newport News, Virginia, where the original boilers and all propelling machinery, including shafts and stern bearing, were removed.

Two separate 10,000-kilowatt turbines were installed for a power plant that could produce up to 20,000 kilowatts of electrical power at once. A double bottom for fuel oil and water for the four new boilers was fitted. The ship's crew quarters were left to house personnel operating the plant. The shore connection was by three heavy cables passed from a movable tower over a barrel crossarm to shore. The power plant boilers were designed so that they could be converted to use powdered coal instead of fuel oil. As of December 31, 1930, the company had invested $1,473,322.83 in the plant with $660,000 being paid to Newport News Shipbuilding and Dry Dock Company. The actual cost of operation was less than projected.

The vessel remained in registry for 1932 with tonnage shown as 4843 GRT, 3006 NRT with the USSB mistakenly shown as owner. By 1934, the vessel was out of registry as a ship and listed as "abandoned" under "Vessels Abandoned, Reduced Below 5 Tons, or Removed for Other Causes".

== History as floating power plant ==
After conversion, permanent berthing facilities were provided at Bucksport, Maine, and Portsmouth, New Hampshire, so that Jacona could produce power at either location. The plant was towed by a tug to Bucksport to be put into service on November 15, 1930. There it supplied the Maine Seaboard Paper Company mill with 24,121,000 kilowatt-hours of electricity from November 1930 to March 1931. The mill otherwise could not obtain enough energy from other sources. It was placed as an interim power source until the Bingham Hydro Plant was completed and came online. (Note: The mill also obtained electrical power from the Central Maine Power Company generated at Wyman Dam.)

When Jacona was no longer used at Maine, the New England Public Service Company anchored the ship at Portsmouth, New Hampshire, and leased the electrical power it generated. It later bought the vessel outright from the United States Shipping Board. The electricity generated was connected to its city power transmission lines. It produced and supplemented about 15% of the total electrical power needed for Portsmouth and about 30% of its total steam power requirements. The steam was super-heated to 250 °F (121 °C) and was at 400 pounds per square inch (2,800 kPa) of pressure.

A 1941 review of a decade of operation noted the plant had provided 564,000,000 kilowatt-hours to the utility on a schedule closely coordinated with the shore based plants. The plant's availability had been 90% with one unit and 85% with both generating sets. Operation was linked with the water conditions in the rivers so that under ideal hydroelectric conditions the plant would be shut down but could go up to 22,000 kilowatts under low water conditions. The hull was inspected by divers annually and the vessel had been put into dry dock at Portsmouth after tow by three tugs in 1934 and 1939 for about five days each time. The plant was out of service about three weeks each of those years.

On March 17, 1945, Jacona was delivered to the War Shipping Administration (WSA) at Portsmouth by the Public Service Company of Manchester, New Hampshire, and placed under bareboat charter to the U.S. Army. The first duty after shakedown for the Navy tug Nipmuc, commissioned July 8, 1945, was to tow Jacoma from the Atlantic to Pearl Harbor, Hawaii.

To compensate for Portsmouth's loss, work was then rushed to complete the J. Brodie Smith Hydro Plant on the Androscoggin River at Errol, New Hampshire, to produce Portsmouth's electrical needs. Work was also expedited on a 40,000 kilowatt transmission line that connected the electrical lines at Nashua of the Public Service Company of New Hampshire to the New England Power Company at Tewksbury, Massachusetts.

In 1947, the floating power plant Jacona was transferred from charter to the Army to the U.S. Navy and designated YFP-1. From March 1946 to December 1947 the barge was leased by the Hawaiian Electric Company, Inc. to supplement its grid when post war building material shortages delayed completion of its Waiau Power Plant Unit 3.

== Korea service ==
The tug Takelma departed Hawaii on January 6, 1948, towing Jacona to Pusan, Korea. The Russians shut off hydroelectric power to the South Korean Peninsula in May 1948. The floating generator power plant then furnished electricity into the general Korean power grid. On one day in 1950, a rat got into the generator mechanism and short circuited it. Another electrical generator on board the ship automatically came online to compensate for the loss of electricity that was produced by the first generator. This extra load caused the second generator to overheat and it eventually burned itself out. Korea had to restrict their use of electricity, since Jacona's generators were no longer furnishing power at that time.

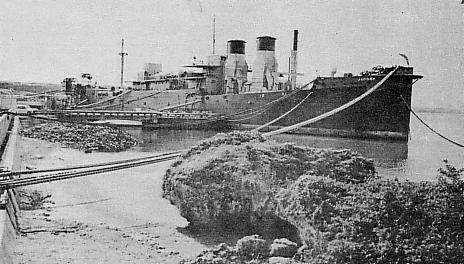
Ryukyu Electric Power Corporation Power Plant Ship Jacona

The U.S. government flew in spare parts to make the necessary repairs to the generators and later the power was restored from the ship. The U.S. Economic Cooperation Administration helped build a permanent 22,000 kilowatt hydroelectric power plant and a 60,000 kilowatt steam-powered electric generator for facilities in Korea when the Jacona was removed from their power supply grid.

== Later service ==
Jacona provided power at Okinawa while operated by Ryukyu Electric Power Corporation around 1969. She was sold to buyers in the Philippines in October 1971.
