= Seattle–Tacoma Shipbuilding Corporation =

American shipbuilding company (1939–1946)

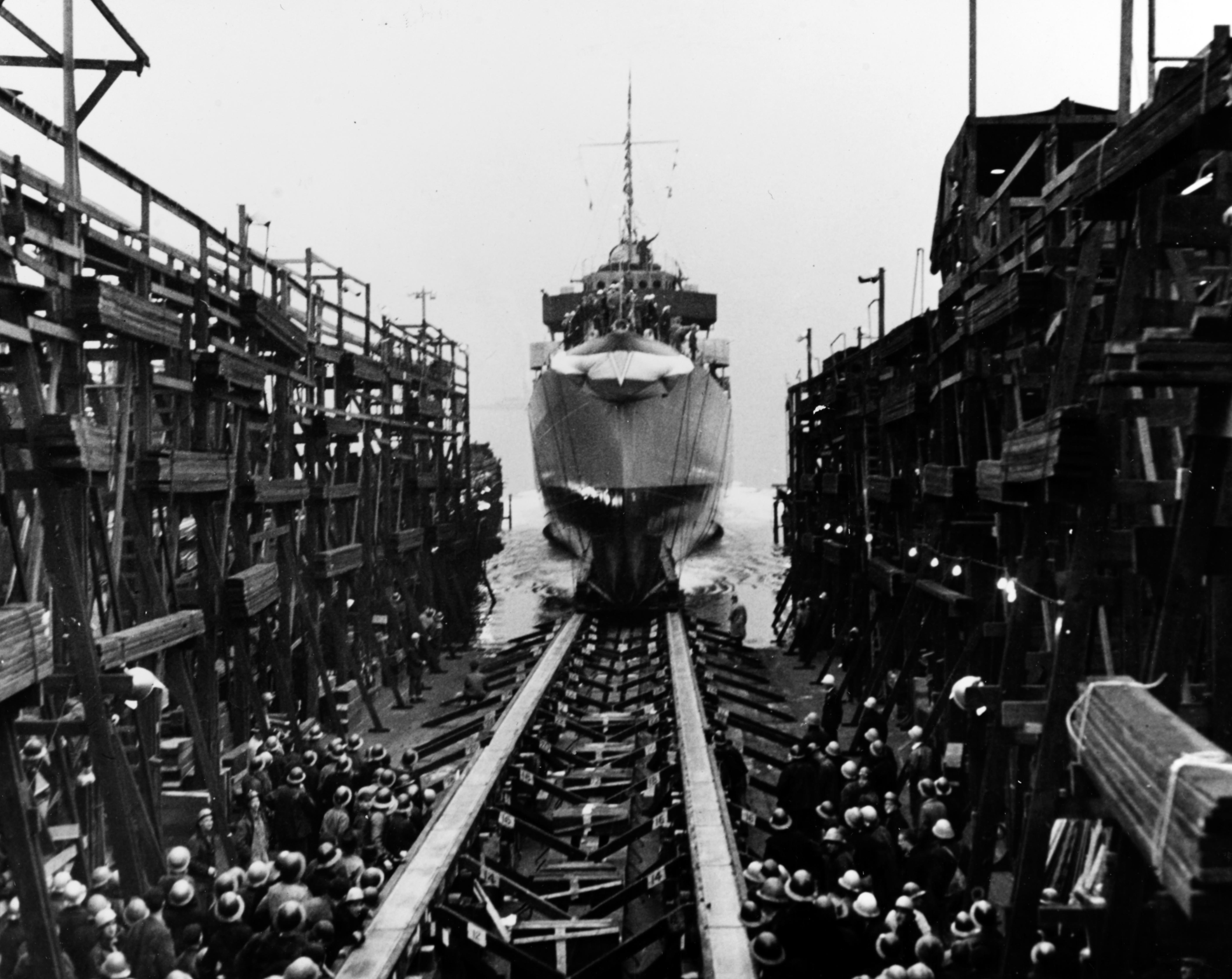
- Launch of USS Johnston (DD-557), 1943
- Industry: Shipbuilding
- Founded: 1939
- Defunct: 1946
- Headquarters: Tacoma, Washington United States
- Parent: Todd Shipyards Corporation; Kaiser Shipbuilding

The Seattle–Tacoma Shipbuilding Corporation (later renamed Todd Pacific Shipyards, Inc.) was an American shipbuilding company which built escort carriers, destroyers, cargo ships and auxiliaries for the United States Navy and merchant marine during World War II. It consisted of two yards, one in Seattle and one in Tacoma, along the Puget Sound of Washington. It was the largest producer of destroyers (45) on the West Coast and the largest producer of escort carriers of various classes (56) of any United States shipyard active during World War II.

== History ==
=== Predecessor shipyards ===
The William H. Todd Corporation, just having established itself in New York, acquired the Seattle Construction and Drydock Company (formerly the Moran Brothers shipyard) in the Seattle Harbor during World War I in 1916. The yard was acquired in 1918 by Skinner & Eddy, which had quickly risen to become a major force in Northwest Pacific shipbuilding. Todd moved his Seattle operation to nearby Harbor Island where a repair facility was constructed. In 1917 the company also set foot in Tacoma, where the first work on facilities of an entirely new yard was underway in January 1917 and the first ship, the Tacoma, was launched on March 28, 1918.

3 of 10 Omaha-class light cruisers and 23 cargo ships of 7,500dwt were built in the Tacoma yard (including Jacona, which survived till at least 1971), the Caldwell-class destroyer USS Gwin (DD-71) and the N-class submarines N-1, N-2 and N-3 as well as 14 cargo ships of mostly 7,500dwt also were built in Seattle.

In addition to the government contracts, the Tacoma yard built 2 cargo ships (named Red Hook and Hoboken after 2 of Todd's New York Harbor locations), 1 diesel freighter, 2 passenger ships and 6 barges. The Red Hook found its way into Imperial Japanese Army service as Naruo Maru and was sunk in 1944.

Shipbuilding ceased in the Seattle yard in 1920 and in the Tacoma yard in 1924.

=== Seattle–Tacoma Shipbuilding Corporation ===
In 1939, the old Tacoma shipyard in Commencement Bay was revived (from scratch) by the Todd Shipyards Corporation and Kaiser Shipbuilding, initially with two slipways. With the aid of some $15 million in capital provided by the U.S. Government, this was eventually increased to eight.

Todd Affiliates to build C-1's at Tacoma Yard

TODD Shipyards Corporation announces the award of five C- 1 Type B Diesel propelled vessels to the Seattle-Tacoma Shipbuilding Corporation, of Seattle, Washington, at a price of $2,127,000 each. Associated with them is the General Construction Co. of Seattle and its affiliates. R. J. Lamont, president of the Todd Seattle Dry Docks Inc., of Seattle, is also president of this company; J. A. McEachern, of the General Construction Co., being vice-president.

This marks the culmination of negotiations with the Maritime Commission to bring a restoration of the shipbuilding industry to the Pacific Northwest. The cooperation of Seattle and Tacoma labor was an important factor in securing the award. The plan involves the rehabilitation of the Todd Tacoma plant for the construction of the hulls, the completion and outfitting of the vessels to be performed at the plant of the Todd Seattle Dry Docks Inc., in Seattle.

Following the enactment of the Two-Ocean Navy Act, Seattle-Tacoma was awarded contracts to build 25 destroyers. The government invested $9 million in a new destroyer construction facility on Harbor Island which was then built starting October 15, 1940 next to the existing repair dock founded in 1918.

In February 1942, Todd bought out Kaiser's holding and sold the company's own interests in Permanente Metals.

=== Todd Pacific Shipyards ===
In June 1944, the Seattle-Tacoma Shipbuilding Corporation was renamed Todd Pacific Shipyards, Inc., which existed as a legal entity until November 1946. Todd sold the Tacoma shipyard to the Navy after the war ended, which in turn sold the site to the Port of Tacoma in 1959. The Seattle division at Harbor Island resumed building new vessels in 1952.

The "Plant A" destroyer facility produced a single civilian ship, the luxury ferry Chinook, launched in 1947, but by 1952 oil terminals had been established in the spot.

The original repair yard continued to be part of the Todd Corporation, now building new civilian and military ships and it remains active to this day as a facility of Vigor Marine Group.

== Ships built ==
=== Tacoma yard ===
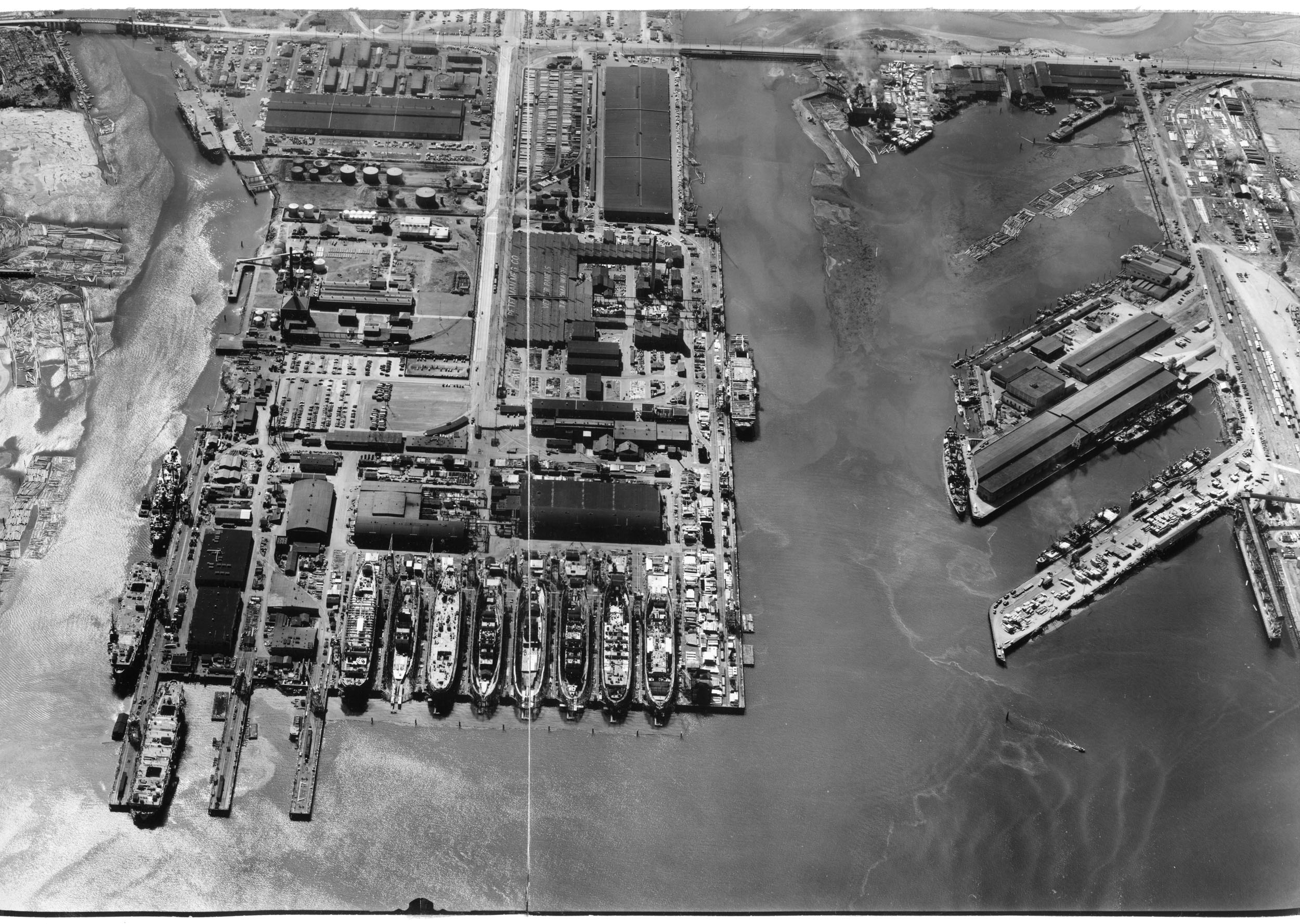
Tacoma yard in 1945

In Commencement Bay (47.27949°N 122.40705°W)

Escort carriers (56)

- 37 of 45 Bogue-class escort carriers (C3-S-A1)
  - several were completed / fitted out at Willamette Iron and Steel Works, Portland, Oregon
- 19 of 19 Commencement Bay-class escort carriers
  - Commencement Bay (CVE-105) ... Tinian (CVE-123)
  - 3 completed at Commercial Iron Works in Portland, Oregon (CVE-110, CVE-126, CVE-121)
  - 1 completed at Willamette Iron and Steel Works in Portland, Oregon (CVE-108)

Auxiliaries (14)

- 2 of 2 Frederick Funston-class attack transports (C3-S1-A3)
  - Frederick Funston (APA-89), James O'Hara (APA-90)
  - ordered October 23, 1940
- 4 of 4 Kenneth Whiting-class seaplane tenders (C3 Mod.)
  - Kenneth Whiting (AV-14) ... Cumberland Sound (AV-17)
- 5 of 23 Patapsco-class gasoline tankers (T1-MT-M1)
  - Patapsco (AOG-1) ... Susquehanna (AOG-5)
- 3 of 6 Shenandoah-class destroyer tenders
  - Shenandoah (AD-26), Yellowstone (AD-27), Grand Canyon (AD-28)

Cargo (5)

- 5 of 95 C1-B (5 of 10 diesel variant C1-B)
  - ordered: 10 September 1939
  - first keel laying on 5 March 1940
  - Cape Alava (MC-119) launched August 1, 1940, delivered to American Mail Lines April 3, 1941
  - Cape Flattery (MC-120) launched September 28, 1940, delivered to American Mail lines May 29, 1941
  - Cape Cleare (MC-121) launched November 29, 1940, renamed Oregon, delivered to Pacific-Atlantic Steamship Corporation, sunk 1941
  - Cape Fairweather (MC-122) launched April 11, 1941
  - Cape Douglas (MC-123) launched June 10, 1941, renamed Idaho delivered to Pacific-Atlantic Steamship Corporation
  - 2 Hooven-Owens-Rentschler 6-cylinder diesel engines with magnetic coupling and single reduction gears (2.55:1)
  - 2 Washington Iron Works auxiliary diesels

Ships of World War II produced before 1924 (incomplete)

  - Empire Antelope – torpedoed November 1942 on Atlantic convoy duty (SC 107)
  - Empire Wagtail – torpedoed December 1942 on Atlantic convoy duty (ON 154)
  - Berury – torpedoed September 1941 on Atlantic convoy duty (SC 42)
  - Otho – torpedoed off the coast of Virginia April 1942
  - Caterina – sunk by aerial torpedo as part of an Italian convoy
  - El Coston
  - Empire Mallard
  - Empire Tiger
  - Empire Elk – survived
  - Willimantic (built in Seattle)
  - Empire Gazelle – survived

Description of the plant as of January 1940:
Photograph of the plant in the initial 2-ways stage (launch of the Cape Alava):

=== Seattle yard ===
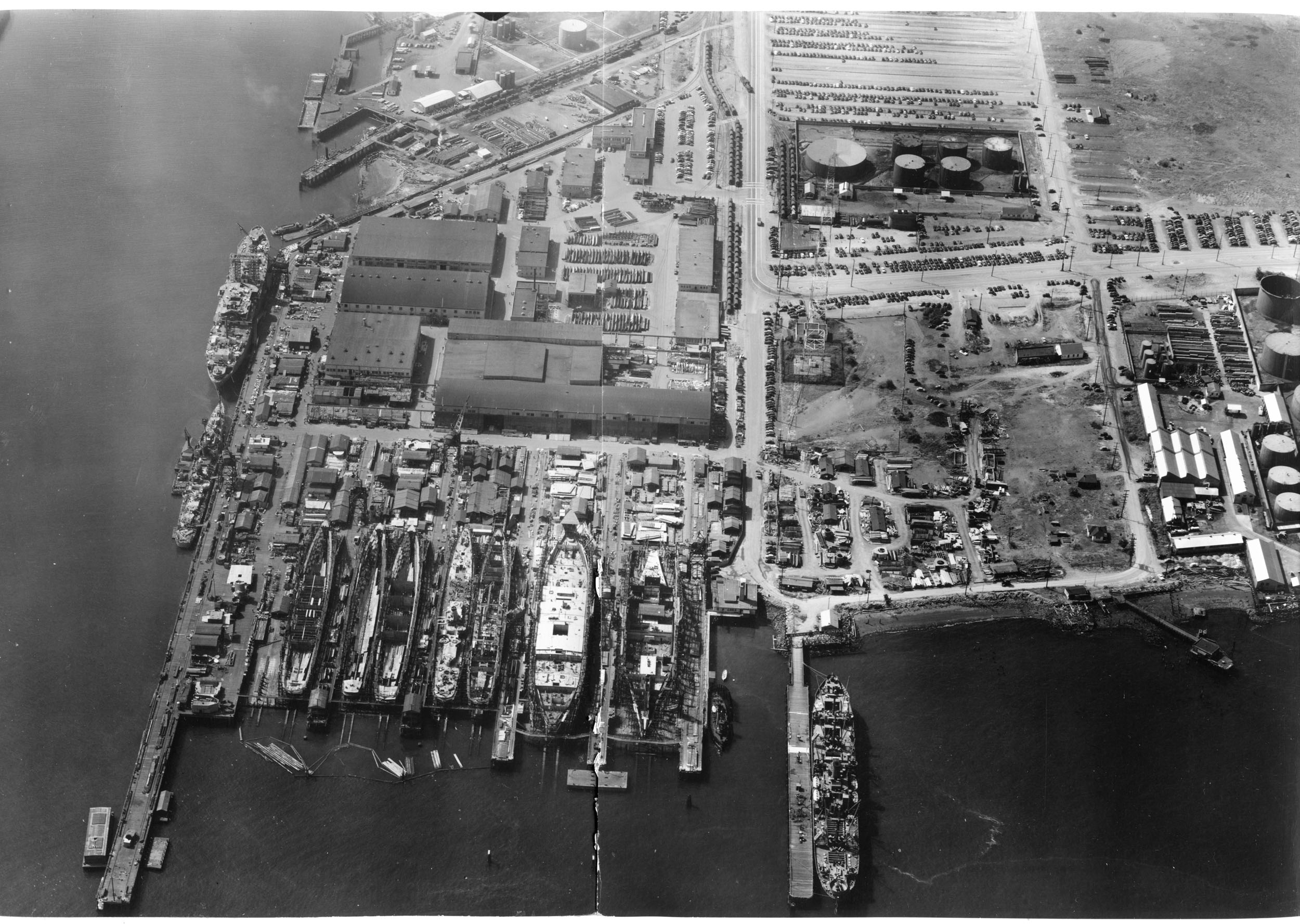
Seattle yard in 1945

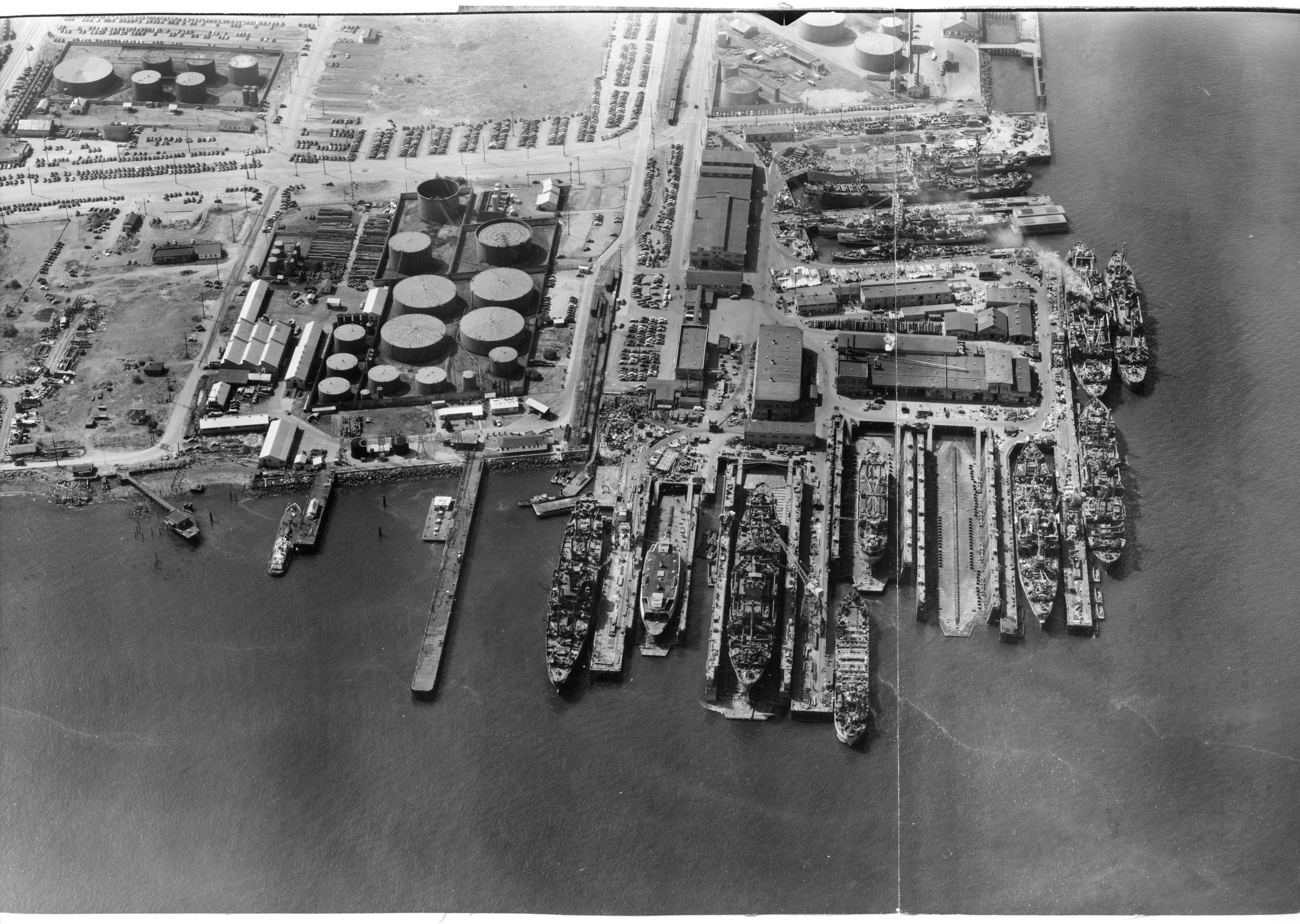
The repair yard in 1945

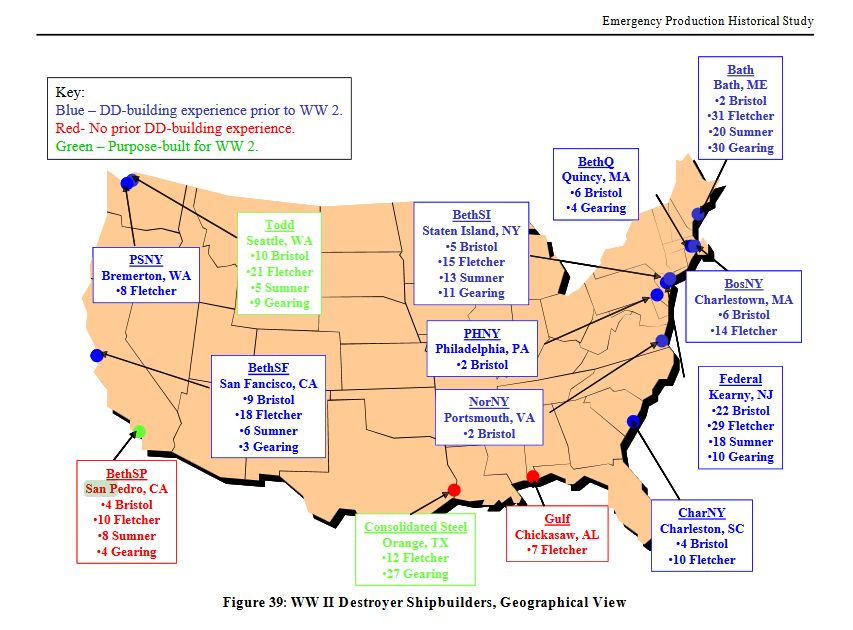
World War II Destroyer Shipbuilders map from Department of Defense (DoD)

on Harbor Island (47.58903°N 122.3481°W) in 2 separate facilities at the north end of the island. In 1918 Todd moved out of the seattle waterfront and opened a repair facility on the northwestern corner. In 1940 additional slipways were added on the northeastern end. The expansion had all 5 building ways upon initial completion (2 destroyers each). In June 1945, 5 destroyers were building, the unfinished Seaman (DD-791) was about to be laid down and 2 destroyer tenders (Isle Royale (AD-29) and Great Lakes (AD-30) - eventually aborted) were using up 1 full slipway each.

Although the Seattle yard produced the largest number of destroyers on the West Coast, Union Iron Works was slightly more productive overall with 4 Atlantas, 9 Bensons, 18 Fletchers, 6 Sumners, 3 Gearings and 12 Buckleys.

Contracts awarded

- NOD1502 7/40 destroyers $29,406,000 (= 5 Gleaves)
- NOD1511 9/40 destroyers $109,726,000 (= 15 Fletcher)
- NOD1502S 12/40 destroyers $29,406,000 (= 5 Gleaves)
- NOD1760 3/41 gasoline tankers aog $10,700,000 (= 5 Patapsco, built in Tacoma)
- OBS315 8/42 destroyers $40,799,000 (= 6 Fletcher)
- OBS329 8/42 destroyers $107,535,000 (= 15 Sumner)
- OBS10215 8/44 ship repairs $2,081,000
- total: $329,653,000

45 of 415 destroyers

- 10 of 66 Gleaves-class
  - (May 1, 1941 - September 7, 1942)
  - Carmick (DD-493) ... USS Frankford (DD-497)
  - Baldwin (DD-624) ... USS Welles (DD-628)
- 21 of 175 Fletcher-class
  - (March 8, 1942 - June 6, 1944)
  - Franks (DD-554) ... Wren (DD-568)
  - Jarvis (DD-799) ... Rooks (DD-804)
- 5 of 58 Allen M. Sumner-class (as Todd Pacific according to some sources)
  - USS Zellars (DD-777) ... Robert K. Huntington (DD-781)
- 9 of 98 Gearing-class (as Todd Pacific according to some sources)
  - Rowan (DD-782) ... USS Shelton (DD-790)
  - 1 additional, USS Seaman (DD-791), was launched incomplete and never commissioned

1 of 6 Shenandoah-class destroyer tenders

- Isle Royale (AD-29)
- Great Lakes (AD-30) - canceled incomplete

== Pacific Reserve Fleet, Tacoma ==
After the war the United States Navy took over the Seattle-Tacoma Shipbuilding shipyard and for use as part of the United States Navy reserve fleets, also called a mothball fleet. The Pacific Reserve Fleet, Tacoma was used to store the now many surplus ships after World War II. Some ships in the Commencement Bay Reserve Fleet were reactivated for the Korean War. The Navy sold the shipyard to the Port of Tacoma in 1959. The ships stored at Pacific Reserve Fleet, Tacoma were either scrapped or moved to other reserve fleets.

Example ships:

- USS Lunga Point was placed in the Pacific Reserve Fleet, Tacoma in 1946 and removed in June 1955 and recommissioned as CVU-94.
- USS Kwajalein was placed in the Pacific Reserve Fleet, Tacoma in 1946 and removed in June 1955 and recommissioned as CVU-98 a utility aircraft carrier.
- USS Tinian (CVE-123), a Commencement Bay-class escort carrier, was stored at Reserve Fleet, Tacoma, being completed in 1946, too late for World War II. On June 12, 1955, the ship was reclassified as an escort helicopter aircraft carrier and re-designated CVHE-123.

== See also ==
- Boeing Plant 2 – located a few miles upstream the Duwamish River
- Pacific Reserve Fleet, Bremerton
