= Design 1014 ship =

World War I steel-hulled cargo ship design

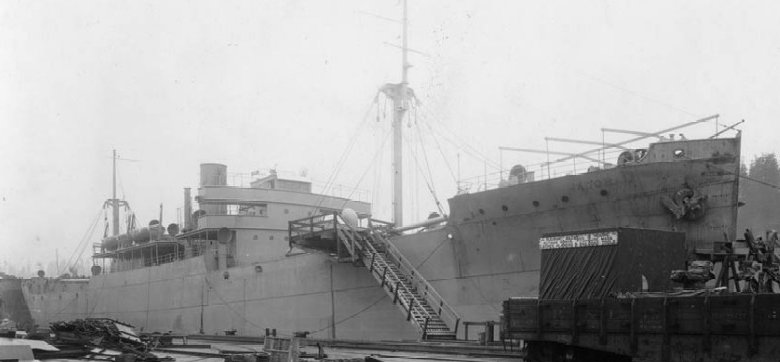
- SS Jacona, a Design 1014 ship

Class overview
- Name: EFC Design 1014
- Builders: Todd Shipyards
- Built: 1919–20 (USSB)
- Planned: 34
- Completed: 22 (20 USSB, 2 private)
- Canceled: 12

General characteristics
- Type: Cargo ship
- Tonnage: 7,500 dwt
- Length: 380 ft 0 in (115.82 m)
- Beam: 53 ft 0 in (16.15 m)
- Draft: 27 ft 0 in (8.23 m)
- Propulsion: Triple expansion engine, oil fuel

The Design 1014 ship (full name Emergency Fleet Corporation Design 1014) was a steel-hulled cargo ship design approved for production by the United States Shipping Board's Emergency Fleet Corporation (EFC) in World War I. They were referred to as the "Cascade"-type. They were all built by Todd Drydock and Construction Company, at their Tacoma, Washington shipyard. 20 ships were completed for the USSB in 1919 and 1920; and additional 2 were completed in 1920 for private companies. 12 ships were cancelled.

== Bibliography ==
- McKellar, Norman L. "Steel Shipbuilding under the U. S. Shipping Board, 1917-1921, Part I, Contract Steel Ships" (PDF). Steel Shipbuilding under the U. S. Shipping Board, 1917-1921. ShipScribe.
