= USCGC Elm (WAGL-260) =

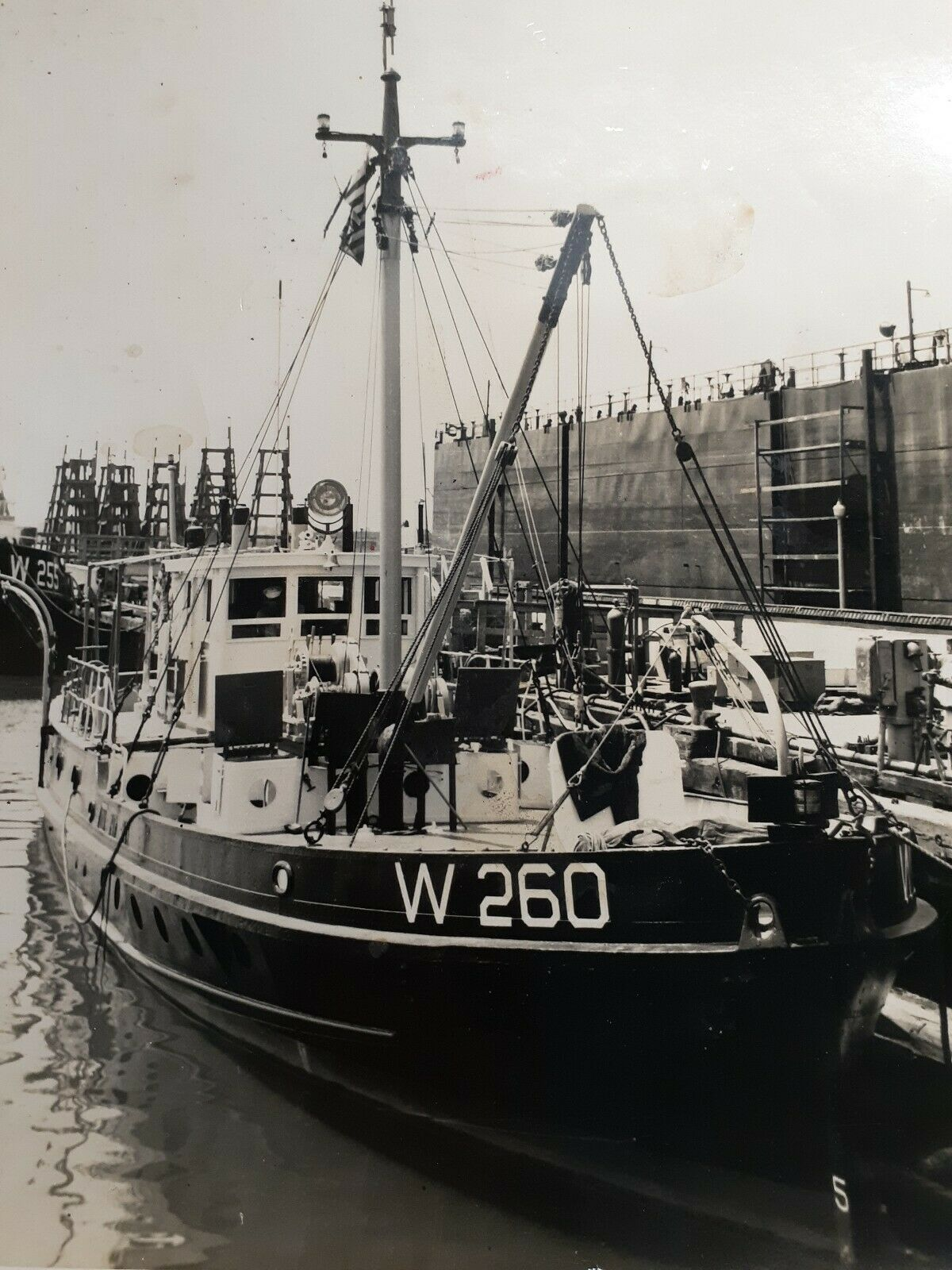
- USCGC Elm

History

United States
- Name: USCGC Elm
- Operator: U. S. Lighthouse Service (1938 - 1939); U.S. Coast Guard (1939 - 1969)
- Builder: Defoe Boat and Motor Works
- Commissioned: April 1, 1938
- Decommissioned: July 30, 1969
- Stricken: June 19, 1972
- Home port: Atlantic City, New Jersey
- Identification: Call sign NRWM
- Fate: Decommissioned 1969

General characteristics
- Displacement: 77 tons at full load
- Length: 72.33 ft (22.05 m)
- Beam: 17.5 ft (5.3 m)
- Draft: 5 ft (1.5 m)
- Installed power: 2 x 150 hp Diesel engines
- Propulsion: 2 propellers
- Speed: 9 knots
- Range: 900 miles at 8 knots
- Complement: 9 enlisted

USCGC Elm (WAGL-260/WLI-72260) was an inland buoy tender used maintain aids to navigation by the United States Coast Guard.

== Construction ==
Elm was designed for maintaining aids to navigation in the shallow waters of New Jersey rivers. She was meant to replace the wooden USLHT Pine. She was built by Defoe Boat and Motor Works of Bay City, Michigan. The contract price was $77,177. Elm was 72.33 feet (22.05 m) long, with a beam of 17.5 feet (5.3 m), and a draft of 5 feet (1.5 m). At full load, her displacement was 77 tons. Her hull was built of steel plates. Her derrick had a working capacity of 2,000 pounds (910 kg).

Elm had two propellers which were driven by two 150 hp Diesel engines.

Sea trials for the new ship were held on November 17, 1937, off Bay City.

== Operational history ==
After launch and sea trials, Elm left Bay City on November 19, 1937. She sailed down through the New York Barge Canal and Hudson River to reach her new homeport of Atlantic City, New Jersey.

The ship was ordered, launched. and commissioned by the United States Lighthouse Service. On July 1, 1939, the US Lighthouse Service, including Elm, was merged into the United States Coast Guard. Elm changed her moorage in Atlantic City as a result of this reorganizational. She moved from a municipal dock to the new Coast Guard base in 1940.

While her primary mission was maintaining aids to navigation, she also supported the Coast Guard's other missions. She was involved in search and rescue operations throughout her career.

As part of the Coast Guard, Elm was designated WAGL, classifying her as an auxiliary vessel, buoy tender. In 1966 the ship designation scheme was changed and the ship was redesignated WLI, buoy tender, inland.

Elm was decommissioned at Governor's Island, New York on July 30, 1969. After a brief ceremony she was towed to the Coast Guard Yard in Baltimore for storage. The ship was replaced by USCGC Brier, which was moved from Brunswick, Georgia to Atlantic City. Elm was struck on June 19, 1972.
