= Cogswell =

Cogswell may refer to:

== People ==
- Cogswell (surname), a list of people
- Cogswell K. Green (1809–1889), American lawyer and politician
- Cogswell Thomas, pen name of Theodore L. Thomas (1920–2005), American short story writer

== Places ==
- Cogswell, North Dakota, United States, a city
- Cogswell Dam, Los Angeles County, California, United States
- Cogswell Tower, Nova Scotia, Canada

== Schools in the United States ==
- University of Silicon Valley, San Jose, California, originally named Cogswell Technical School and later Cogswell Polytechnical College
- Henry Cogswell College, Everett, Washington

== Military ==
- Cogswell's Regiment of Militia, a Massachusetts militia from 1775 to 1777
- USS Cogswell, a US Navy destroyer

== Fictional characters ==
- Cosmo Cogswell, a character in the American animated series The Jetsons
