= VMF-514 =

Marine Fighting Squadron 514
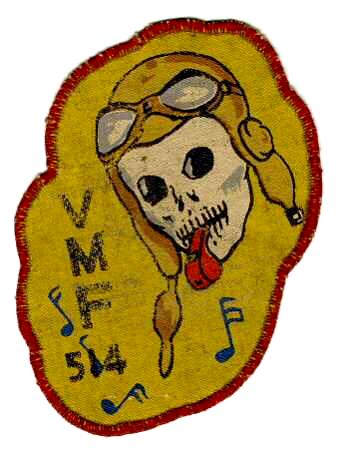
- VMF-514 Insignia
- Active: 20 February 1944 – 9 December 1945
- Country: United States
- Allegiance: United States of America
- Branch: United States Marine Corps
- Type: Fighter squadron
- Role: Air interdiction Close air support
- Part of: Inactive

Aircraft flown
- Fighter: Vought F4U Corsair; Grumman F6F Hellcat

Marine Fighting Squadron 514 (VMF-514) was a short-lived fighter squadron of the United States Marine Corps during World War II. Flying the Vought F4U Corsair, the squadron was originally commissioned to be part of the ill-fated Project Danny, a plan for carrier based Marine Corps aircraft to interdict German V-1 flying bomb launch sites. The squadron did not participate in combat action during the war and was decommissioned on 9 December 1945. No other Marine Corps squadron has carried VMF-514's lineage and honors since that time.

== History ==
Marine Fighting Squadron 471 (VMF-514) was commissioned on 20 February 1944, at Marine Corps Air Station Cherry Point, North Carolina by authority of Bureau of Aeronautics Directive 30-KV-43. The squadron originally fell under the command of Marine Aircraft Group 51.

In June 1944, Navy planners devised a plan for Marine F4U Corsair squadrons of MAG-51 (including VMF-511, VMF-512, and VMF-513) to attack V-1 flying bomb launch sites from escort carriers in the North Sea with Tiny Tim rockets. Project Danny was ultimately disapproved, a victim of the intense interservice rivalry that existed in the US armed forces during World War II; Army Chief of Staff General George Marshall stood up and walked out of the briefing: "That's the end of this briefing. As long as I'm in charge there'll never be a Marine in Europe."

In June 1945, VMF-514 embarked on the USS Salerno Bay along with VMSB-144 as part of Marine Carrier Air Group 5 (MCVG-5) to train off southern California. Two days after Japan's mid-August capitulation, the group sailed west conducting further training operations, including night qualification of her Marine air group, in Hawaiian waters.

The squadron returned to Marine Corps Air Depot Miramar, California and was decommissioned on 9 December 1945.

== Accidents ==
- 8 April 1944 – An F4U-1A from VMF-514 crashed near Morehead City, North Carolina. The pilot, 2ndLt Olin Dilworth Cooksey, was killed in the crash.

== Commanding Officers ==
The following naval aviators served as commanding officers of VMF-514 during its existence:

- Maj James W. Merritt – 20 February 1944 – 1 April 1945
- Maj Darrell D. Irwin – 2 April 1945 – 27 July 1945
- Maj William V. Brooks – 28 July 1945 –

== Unit awards ==
A unit citation or commendation is an award bestowed upon an organization for the action cited. Members of the unit who participated in said actions are allowed to wear on their uniforms the awarded unit citation. VMF-514 was presented with the following awards:

Ribbon	Unit Award
	World War II Victory Medal

== See also ==
- United States Marine Corps Aviation
- List of active United States Marine Corps aircraft squadrons
- List of decommissioned United States Marine Corps aircraft squadrons
