= Air Warning Squadron 9 =

- Active: 1 Apr 1944 – 9 Dec 1945
- Country: United States
- Allegiance: United States of America
- Branch: United States Marine Corps
- Type: Aviation Command & Control
- Role: Aerial surveillance & early warning
- Size: 343

Commanders
- Current commander: N/A

Air Warning Squadron 9 (AWS-9) was a United States Marine Corps aviation command and control squadron during World War II. The squadron's primary mission was to provide aerial surveillance and early warning of approaching enemy aircraft during amphibious assaults. Formed in April 1944, the squadron did not deploy overseas until after the end of the war. It arrived in Tokyo Bay to take part in the occupation of Japan only to find out it was not required. The squadron returned to the U.S. and was decommissioned shortly after in December 1945. To date, no other Marine Corps squadron has carried the lineage and honors of AWS-9 to include the former Marine Air Control Squadron 9 (MACS-9).

== Equipment ==
- AN/TTQ-1 - transportable filter and operations center.
- 2 x SCR-270s - long range early warning radar.
- 1 x SCR-527 - medium-range early warning radar used for ground-controlled interception (GCI).
- 3 x SCR-602s - Light-weight early warning radar to be utilized during the initial stages of an amphibious assault.

== History ==
=== Organization and training ===
Air Warning Squadron 9 was commissioned on 1 April 1944, as part of Marine Air Warning Group 1 at Marine Corps Air Station Cherry Point, North Carolina. On 21 April the squadron moved to Marine Corps Outlying Field Oak Grove in Pollocksville, North Carolina. Air Warning Group 1 maintained its training equipment at the Pollocksville site and each new Air Warning Squadron commissioned rotated through for their first familiarization on the gear. While there the squadron conducted more than 250 day interception and 84 night interceptions while working with VMF-511, VMF-512, VMF-513, VMF-514, VMF-314 and VMF-324. On 27 May 1944, the squadron returned to MCAS Cherry Point in preparation for transfer to the west coast.

AWS-9 departed North Carolina via rail on 5 June 1944, arriving at Marine Corps Air Depot Miramar, California on 10 June. At Miramar, AWS-9 fell under the command of Air Warning Group 2. In early June the squadron began drawing training equipment from AWG-2 in preparation for additional training throughout Southern California. Besides MCAD Miramar, the squadron also sent training detachments to Camp Callan near La Jolla and Marine Corps Base Camp Pendleton. On 10 November 1944, the squadron's duties were changed to that of a replacement training squadron for air warning personnel. The squadron was relocated to Marine Corps Auxiliary Airfield Gillespie just south east of MCAD Miramar in January 1945.

=== Deployment to the Pacific and decommissioning ===
On 1 February 1945, the squadron was reverted to being a combat squadron and began preparing for deployment to the Pacific Theater. The squadron sent detachments to Ream Field in Imperial Beach and Camp Callan. In April the squadron began training on new radar equipment fielded to include the SK-1M, SP-1M, and AN/TPS-1B. On 15 May the squadron received a warning order to be prepared to deploy overseas. 2 officers and 29 enlisted marines departed San Diego 28 May on board the USS Algol (AKA-54) and the remaining 27 officers and 285 enlisted men departed on 30 May on board the USS Cleburne (APA-73).

AWS-9 Marine disembarked at Pearl Harbor between 4-6 Jun and moved to Marine Corps Air Station Ewa where it fell under the command of the 3rd Marine Aircraft Wing. While at MCAS Ewa the squadron went to the field for additional training on nighttime GCI. On 23 August, the squadron received a warning order which cancelled all training and order preparation for immediate embarkation on amphibious shipping. Squadron departed Pearl Harbor on 13 September onboard LST 487 & LST-564. The LSTs arrived at the fleet anchorage at Eniwetok Atoll on 23 September and remained there until 7 October. On 18 October AWS-9 arrived in Tokyo Bay off Yokosuka Naval Base. Marine Aircraft Group 31 (MAG-31) informed squadron leadership at that time that its services were not required for occupation duty.

AWS-9 was decommissioned on 8 December 1945.

== Commanding officers ==
- Capt Leon H. Connell - 1 April 1944 – 16 February 1945
- Capt William A. McCluskey - 17 February 1945 - Unknown

== Notable former members ==
- Edward S. Fris - later became a lieutenant general in the Marine Corps serving as the Deputy Commandant for Aviation.

== Unit awards ==
A unit citation or commendation is an award bestowed upon an organization for the action cited. Members of the unit who participated in said actions are allowed to wear on their uniforms the awarded unit citation. What follows is an incomplete list of the awards AWS-9 has been presented with:

Streamer	Award	Year(s)	Additional Info
	World War II Victory Streamer	1943–1945	World War II

== See also ==
- Aviation combat element
- United States Marine Corps Aviation
- List of United States Marine Corps aviation support units
