= Cogswell (surname) =

Cogswell is a surname, derived from the town of Coggeshall in Essex. Notable people with the surname include:

- A. E. Cogswell (1858–1934), British architect
- Alice Cogswell (1805–1830), deaf American, daughter of Mason Fitch Cogswell
- Bryce Cogswell, computer expert
- Charles A. Cogswell (1844–1908), American state senator
- Chris Cogswell, American politician
- Ed Cogswell (1854–1888), Major League Baseball player
- Fred Cogswell (1917–2004), Canadian poet
- Henry D. Cogswell (1820–1900), American dentist and temperance movement crusader
- Henry Hezekiah Cogswell (1776–1854), Nova Scotia lawyer, political figure and philanthropist
- Isabella Binney Cogswell (1819–1874), Canadian businessperson, daughter of Henry Hezekiah Cogswell
- James Kelsey Cogswell (1847–1908), United States Navy admiral who served in Spanish–American War
- John Cogswell (1592–1669), early colonist and landowner in colonial Massachusetts
- John B. D. Cogswell (1829–1889), American state senator
- Joseph Cogswell (1786–1871), American librarian, bibliographer and educator
- Margaret Cogswell (born 1947), American mixed-media installation artist and sculptor
- Mary V. R. Thayer (née Cogswell; 1902–1983), American socialite, journalist and author
- Mason Fitch Cogswell (1761–1830), American physician who pioneered education for the deaf
- Prescott F. Cogswell (1859–1960), American politician
- Sue Cogswell (born 1951), English squash player
- Theodore Cogswell (1918–1987), American science fiction author
- William Cogswell (disambiguation)
