= TCG İzmit =

TCG İzmit is the name of the following ships of the Turkish Navy:

- TCG İzmit (D 342), ex-USS Cogswell, a Fletcher-class destroyer acquired in 1969, scrapped in 1981
- TCG İzmit (F 517), an Istanbul-class frigate launched in 2025

== See also ==
- İzmit
