= 512 Squadron =

512 Squadron may refer to:

- No. 512 Squadron RAF
- 512th Fighter Squadron, United States Air Force
- 512th Rescue Squadron, United States Air Force
- VMF-512, United States Marine Corps
