= 1844 United States presidential election in Michigan =

- November 4, 1844

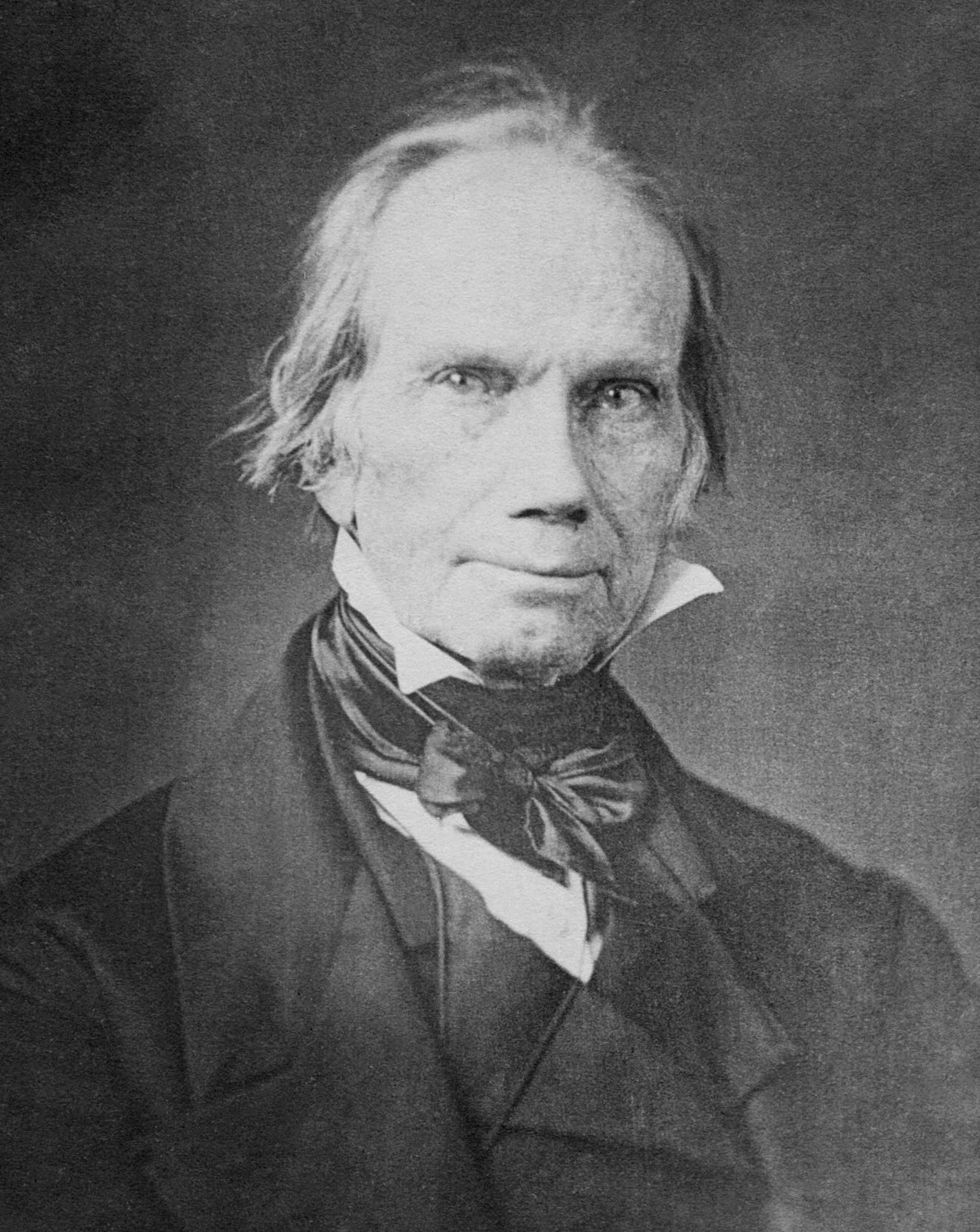

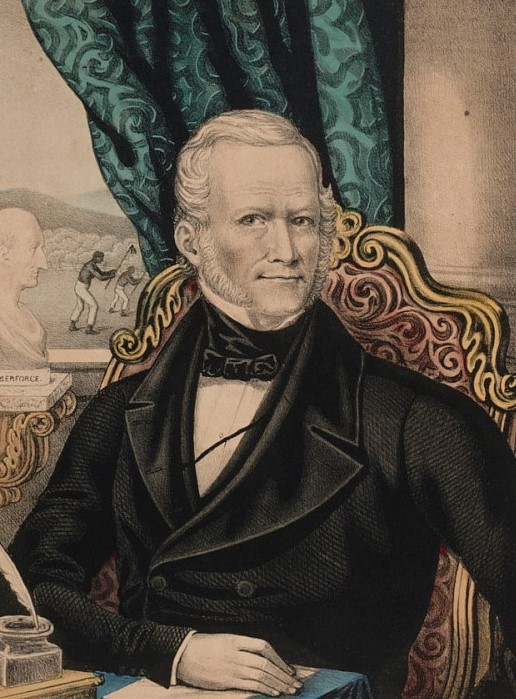
Nominee	James K. Polk	Henry Clay	James G. Birney
Party	Democratic	Whig	Liberty
Home state	Tennessee	Kentucky	Michigan
Running mate	George M. Dallas	Theodore Frelinghuysen	Thomas Morris
Electoral vote	5	0	0
Popular vote	27,737	24,375	3,639
Percentage	49.72%	43.69%	6.52%
County results
Polk
40–50%
50–60%
60–70%
Clay
40–50%
50–60%
President before election
John Tyler
Independent
Elected President
James K. Polk
Democratic

A presidential election was held in Michigan on November 4, 1844 as part of the 1844 United States presidential election. Voters chose five representatives, or electors to the Electoral College, who voted for President and Vice President.

Michigan voted for the Democratic candidate, James K. Polk, over Whig candidate Henry Clay and Liberty candidate James G. Birney. Polk won Michigan by a margin of 6.03%.

With 6.53% of the popular vote, Michigan would prove to be Jame G. Birney's fourth strongest state after New Hampshire, Massachusetts and Vermont.

== Results ==
General Election Results
Party	Pledged to	Elector	Votes
Democratic Party	James K. Polk	Parley J. Spaulding	27,737
Democratic Party	James K. Polk	George Redfield	27,728
Democratic Party	James K. Polk	Charles P. Bush	27,699
Democratic Party	James K. Polk	Louis Beaufait	27,689
Democratic Party	James K. Polk	Samuel Axford	27,686
Whig Party	Henry Clay	John Riddle	24,375
Whig Party	Henry Clay	James L. Conger	24,374
Whig Party	Henry Clay	Cogswell K. Green	24,374
Whig Party	Henry Clay	Darius C. Jackson	24,374
Whig Party	Henry Clay	Norton H. Beckwith	24,287
Liberty Party	James G. Birney	John W. King	3,639
Liberty Party	James G. Birney	Chester G. Gurney	3,637
Liberty Party	James G. Birney	Arthur L. Porter	3,637
Liberty Party	James G. Birney	Chandler Carter	3,628
Liberty Party	James G. Birney	Erastus Hussey	3,626
Write-in		Scattering	34
Votes cast (Note: Based on highest elector on each ticket)			55,785

=== Results by county ===
County	James K. Polk Democratic		Henry Clay Whig		James G. Birney Liberty		Margin		Total votes cast
County	#	%	#	%	#	%	#	%	Total votes cast
Allegan	299	47.24%	323	51.03%	11	1.74%	-24	-3.79%	633
Barry	249	50.51%	228	46.25%	16	3.25%	21	4.26%	493
Berrien	828	52.54%	713	45.24%	35	2.22%	115	7.30%	1,576
Branch	888	54.78%	644	39.73%	89	5.49%	244	15.05%	1,621
Calhoun	1,528	49.12%	1,357	43.62%	226	7.26%	171	5.50%	3,111
Cass	715	46.01%	760	48.91%	59	3.80%	-45	-2.90%	1,554 (Note: Includes 20 Scattering votes.)
Chippewa	34	41.46%	48	58.54%	0	0.00%	-14	-17.07%	82
Clinton	283	50.81%	255	45.78%	19	3.41%	28	5.03%	557
Eaton	376	44.39%	410	48.41%	61	7.20%	-34	-4.01%	847
Genesee	676	42.46%	733	46.04%	183	11.49%	-57	-3.58%	1,592
Hillsdale	1,088	47.97%	968	42.68%	212	9.35%	120	5.29%	2,268
Ingham	441	48.04%	432	47.06%	45	4.90%	9	0.98%	918
Ionia	398	45.49%	418	47.77%	59	6.74%	-20	-2.29%	875
Jackson	1,389	43.87%	1,302	41.12%	475	15.00%	87	2.75%	3,166
Kalamazoo	828	40.65%	932	45.75%	277	13.60%	-104	-5.11%	2,037
Kent	564	52.56%	476	44.36%	33	3.08%	88	8.20%	1,073
Lapeer	502	50.76%	399	40.34%	88	8.90%	103	10.41%	989
Lenawee	2,272	48.57%	2,178	46.56%	228	4.87%	94	2.01%	4,678
Livingston	1,087	57.76%	687	36.50%	108	5.74%	400	21.25%	1,882
Mackinac	100	69.93%	43	30.07%	0	0.00%	57	39.86%	143
Macomb	1,359	55.11%	963	39.05%	140	5.68%	396	16.06%	2,466 (Note: Includes 4 Scattering votes.)
Monroe	1,282	58.22%	870	39.51%	48	2.18%	412	18.71%	2,202 (Note: Includes 2 Scattering votes.)
Oakland	2,833	52.12%	2,225	40.93%	377	6.94%	608	11.18%	5,436 (Note: Includes 1 Scattering vote.)
Ottawa	116	66.29%	42	24.00%	17	9.71%	74	42.29%	175
Saginaw	104	48.83%	107	50.23%	2	0.94%	-3	-1.41%	213
Shiawassee	269	40.45%	300	45.11%	96	14.44%	-31	-4.66%	665
St. Clair	617	50.37%	569	46.45%	27	2.20%	48	3.92%	1,225 (Note: Includes 12 Scattering votes.)
St. Joseph	976	48.92%	935	46.87%	84	4.21%	41	2.06%	1,995
Van Buren	350	52.24%	273	40.75%	46	6.87%	77	11.49%	670
Washtenaw	2,550	48.25%	2,349	44.45%	386	7.30%	201	3.80%	5,285
Wayne	2,736	51.85%	2,346	44.46%	192	3.64%	390	7.39%	5,277 (Note: Includes 3 Scattering votes.)
Total	27,737	49.72%	24,375 (Note: The county results add up to 24,285.)	43.69%	3,639	6.52%	3,362	6.03%	55,785

==== Counties that flipped from Whig to Democratic ====
- Barry
- Clinton
- Hillsdale
- Ingham
- Jackson
- Lapeer
- Lenawee
- Mackinac
- Oakland
- St. Clair
- St. Joseph
- Washtenaw
- Wayne

==== Counties that flipped from Democratic to Whig ====
- Saginaw

== See also ==
- United States presidential elections in Michigan
