= VMA-143 =

Marine Attack Squadron 143
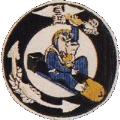
- VMTB-143 Insignia
- Active: 7 September 1942 – 10 March 1946
- Country: United States
- Allegiance: United States of America
- Branch: United States Marine Corps
- Type: Fighter squadron
- Role: Air interdiction close air support
- Part of: Inactive
- Nickname(s): Rocket Raiders
- Engagements: World War II: New Georgia campaign; Battle of Bougainville; Battle of Okinawa; Battle of Balikpapan (1945)

Marine Attack Squadron 143 (VMA-143), nicknamed the Rocket Raiders, was a reserve attack squadron in the United States Marine Corps. Originally commissioned during World War II, the squadron fought at the Guadalcanal, New Georgia, the Battle of Bougainville, Battle of Okinawa, and the Battle of Balikpapan.

== History ==
Marine Scout Bombing Squadron 143 (VMSB-143) was commissioned on 7 September 1942 at Naval Air Station San Diego, California. The squadron departed San Diego on 28 December 1942 arriving at Efate on 16 January 1943. The squadron's flight echelon arrived at Guadalcanal on 15 February 1943. During this time they took part in mine laying operations of Kahili Harbor on Bougainville on 21 March 1943 and supported ground troops during the New Georgia campaign.

On 19 May 1943 planes from VMSB-143 and the Navy's Torpedo Squadron 11 (VT-11) strafed and bombed the Japanese cargo ship Hōun Maru causing it to run aground in Buin Harbor. The squadron was re-designated as Marine Torpedo Bombing Squadron 143 (VMTB-143) on 31 May 1943. On 1 October 1943 the flight echelon of the squadron was divided into three parts in order to support the Bougainville Campaign. These echelons were based at Guadalcanal, Espiritu Santo, and Munda Airfield. In January 1944 the squadron moved to Bougainville and from there participated in airstrikes against the Japanese garrison at Rabaul.

Returning to the United States in June 1944, the squadron was based at Marine Corps Air Station Santa Barbara. The squadron was re-designated again as VMTB (CVS)-143 and was assigned to USS Gilbert Islands (CVE-107). The squadron departed MCAS Santa Barbara on 12 April 1945. During this final phase of the war, the squadron provided close air support during the Battle of Okinawa from May to July 1945. After that is also supported the Australian 7th Division during the Battle of Balikpapan in Borneo. Following the war the squadron returned to Marine Corps Air Station El Toro, California and was deactivated on 10 March 1946 as part of the post war drawdown of forces.

In August 1945, famed comic strip artist Alex Raymond was made an honorary member of the unit while serving alongside them in the Pacific War. He designed a new squadron patch inspired by his work creating Flash Gordon, leading to the squadron nickname of "The Rocket Raiders".

== See also ==
- United States Marine Corps Aviation
- List of decommissioned United States Marine Corps aircraft squadrons
