= Henry Post =

United States Army officer (1885–1914)

Henry Burnet Post
- Born: 15 June 1885
- Died: 9 February 1914 (aged 28); San Diego, California, U.S.
- Burial place: Arlington National Cemetery
- Military career
- Allegiance: United States
- Branch: Aviation Section, Signal Corps
- Rank: 1st Lt.
- Unit: 1st Aero Squadron

Henry Burnet Post (June 15, 1885 – February 9, 1914) was a first lieutenant in the US Army and a pioneer aviator who was killed in a crash. He set the altitude record of 12,120 feet (3,690 m).

He was the son of Colonel Henry Albertson Van Zo Post and Caroline Burnet McLean. On January 25, 1907, he married Grace Woodman Phillips (1887–1971). After his death, she married Francis Cogswell in 1916.

He served in the 25th infantry, and the 1st Aero Squadron. He died in San Diego, California in an air crash. He was buried in Section 3 of Arlington National Cemetery, near other early aviators and also near a number of American astronauts. Henry Post Army Airfield, the airfield at Fort Sill, Oklahoma, is named for him.

== See also ==
- Aeronautical Division, U.S. Signal Corps
- Aviation Section, U.S. Signal Corps
