= USS Gilbert Islands =

Commencement Bay-class escort carrier of the US Navy

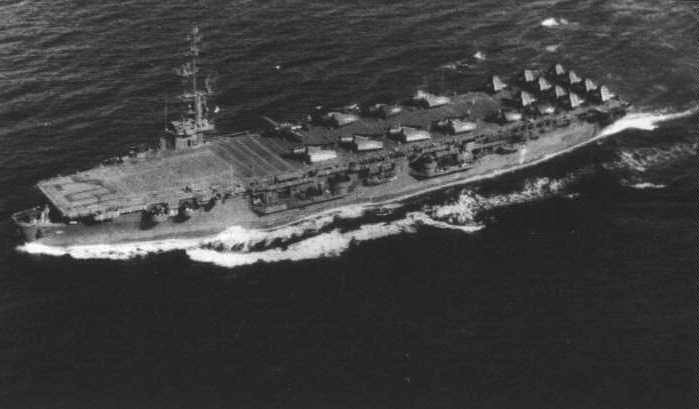
- USS Gilbert Islands in 1945

History

United States
- Name: Gilbert Islands
- Namesake: Gilbert Islands campaign
- Builder: Todd Pacific Shipyards
- Laid down: 29 November 1943
- Launched: 20 July 1944
- Commissioned: 5 February 1945
- Decommissioned: 15 January 1955
- Stricken: June 1961
- Recommissioned: 7 March 1964
- Renamed: USS Annapolis, 22 June 1963
- Stricken: 15 October 1976
- Fate: Sold for scrapping 1 November 1979

General characteristics
- Class & type: Commencement Bay-class escort carrier
- Displacement: 21,397 long tons (21,740 t)
- Length: 557 ft 1 in (169.80 m) loa
- Beam: 75 ft (23 m)
- Draft: 32 ft (9.8 m)
- Installed power: 16,000 shp (12,000 kW); 4 × boilers
- Propulsion: 2 × Steam turbines; 2 × screw propellers
- Speed: 19 knots (35 km/h; 22 mph)
- Complement: 1,066
- Armament: 2 × 5 in (127 mm) dual-purpose guns; 36 × 40 mm (1.6 in) Bofors AA guns; 20 × 20 mm (0.8 in) Oerlikon AA guns
- Aircraft carried: 33
- Aviation facilities: 2 × aircraft catapults

USS Gilbert Islands (ex-St. Andrews Bay) was a Commencement Bay-class escort carrier of the United States Navy. The Commencement Bay class were built during World War II, and were an improvement over the earlier Sangamon class, which were converted from oil tankers. They were capable of carrying an air group of 33 planes and were armed with an anti-aircraft battery of 5 in (127 mm), 40 mm (1.6 in), and 20 mm (0.8 in) guns. The ships were capable of a top speed of 19 knots (35 km/h; 22 mph), and due to their origin as tankers, had extensive fuel storage.

She was launched on 20 July 1944 by the Todd-Pacific Shipyards in Tacoma, Washington. She was sponsored by Mrs. Edwin D. McMorries, wife of Captain Edwin D. McMorries, Surgeon at the Naval Hospital at Puget Sound Naval Yard, and commissioned on 5 February 1945.

She was reclassified as AGMR-1 on 1 June 1963, renamed Annapolis on 22 June 1963 and finally recommissioned on 7 March 1964.

== Design ==
In 1941, as United States participation in World War II became increasingly likely, the US Navy embarked on a construction program for escort carriers, which were converted from transport ships of various types. Many of the escort carrier types were converted from C3-type transports, but the Sangamon-class escort carriers were instead rebuilt oil tankers. These proved to be very successful ships, and the Commencement Bay class, authorized for Fiscal Year 1944, were an improved version of the Sangamon design. The new ships were faster, had improved aviation facilities, and had better internal compartmentation. They proved to be the most successful of the escort carriers, and the only class to be retained in active service after the war, since they were large enough to operate newer aircraft.

Gilbert Islands was 557 ft 1 in (169.80 m) long overall, with a beam of 75 ft (23 m) at the waterline, which extended to 105 ft 2 in (32.05 m) at maximum. She displaced 21,397 long tons (21,740 t) at full load, of which 12,876 long tons (13,083 t) could be fuel oil (though some of her storage tanks were converted to permanently store seawater for ballast), and at full load she had a draft of 27 ft 11 in (8.51 m). The ship's superstructure consisted of a small island. She had a complement of 1,066 officers and enlisted men.

The ship was powered by two Allis-Chalmers geared steam turbines, each driving one screw propeller, using steam provided by four Combustion Engineering-manufactured water-tube boilers. The propulsion system was rated to produce a total of 16,000 shp (12,000 kW) for a top speed of 19 knots (35 km/h; 22 mph). Given the very large storage capacity for oil, the ships of the Commencement Bay class could steam for some 23,900 nautical miles (44,300 km; 27,500 mi) at a speed of 15 knots (28 km/h; 17 mph).

Her defensive anti-aircraft armament consisted of two 5 in (127 mm) dual-purpose guns in single mounts, thirty-six 40 mm (2 in) Bofors guns, and twenty 20 mm (1 in) Oerlikon light AA cannons. The Bofors guns were placed in three quadruple and twelve twin mounts, while the Oerlikon guns were all mounted individually. She carried 33 planes, which could be launched from two aircraft catapults. Two elevators transferred aircraft from the hangar to the flight deck.

== Service history ==
=== Construction and World War II ===
The first fifteen ships of the Commencement Bay class were ordered on 23 January 1943, allocated to Fiscal Year 1944. The ship was originally laid down under the name St. Andrews Bay at the Todd-Pacific Shipyards in Tacoma, Washington, on 29 November 1943. During construction, she was renamed Gilbert Islands after the Gilbert Islands campaign, which culminated in the bloody Battle of Tarawa the same month that work began on the ship. The ship was launched on 20 July 1944 and was commissioned on 5 February 1945. Final fitting out work was then completed, and on 20 February, she got underway for San Diego, California. While en route, a Navy blimp spotted a stray naval mine and requested that Gilbert Islands destroy it with her anti-aircraft guns; her inexperienced gunners expended nearly 850 rounds in total from her 20- and 40 mm guns before they destroyed the mine.

The ship then stopped in Alameda, California, to refuel before arriving in San Diego. There, she loaded ammunition and took on her complement of aviators from Marine Air Group 2, which comprised the fighter squadron VMF-512 and the torpedo squadron VMB-143. The former consisted of eighteen Vought F4U Corsairs and two Grumman F6F Hellcats, and the latter was equipped with twelve Grumman TBM Avengers. On 12 April, Gilbert Islands left San Diego, bound for Pearl Harbor, Hawaii, for a week of combat training exercises. On 2 May, she left Hawaii for the western Pacific, where she joined the main American fleet waging the war against Japanese forces. She arrived in Ulithi in the Caroline Islands on 14 May; her escorting destroyers—Caperton, Cogswell, and Ingersoll—repeatedly reported what proved to be likely false submarine contacts on the voyage.

==== Battle of Okinawa ====
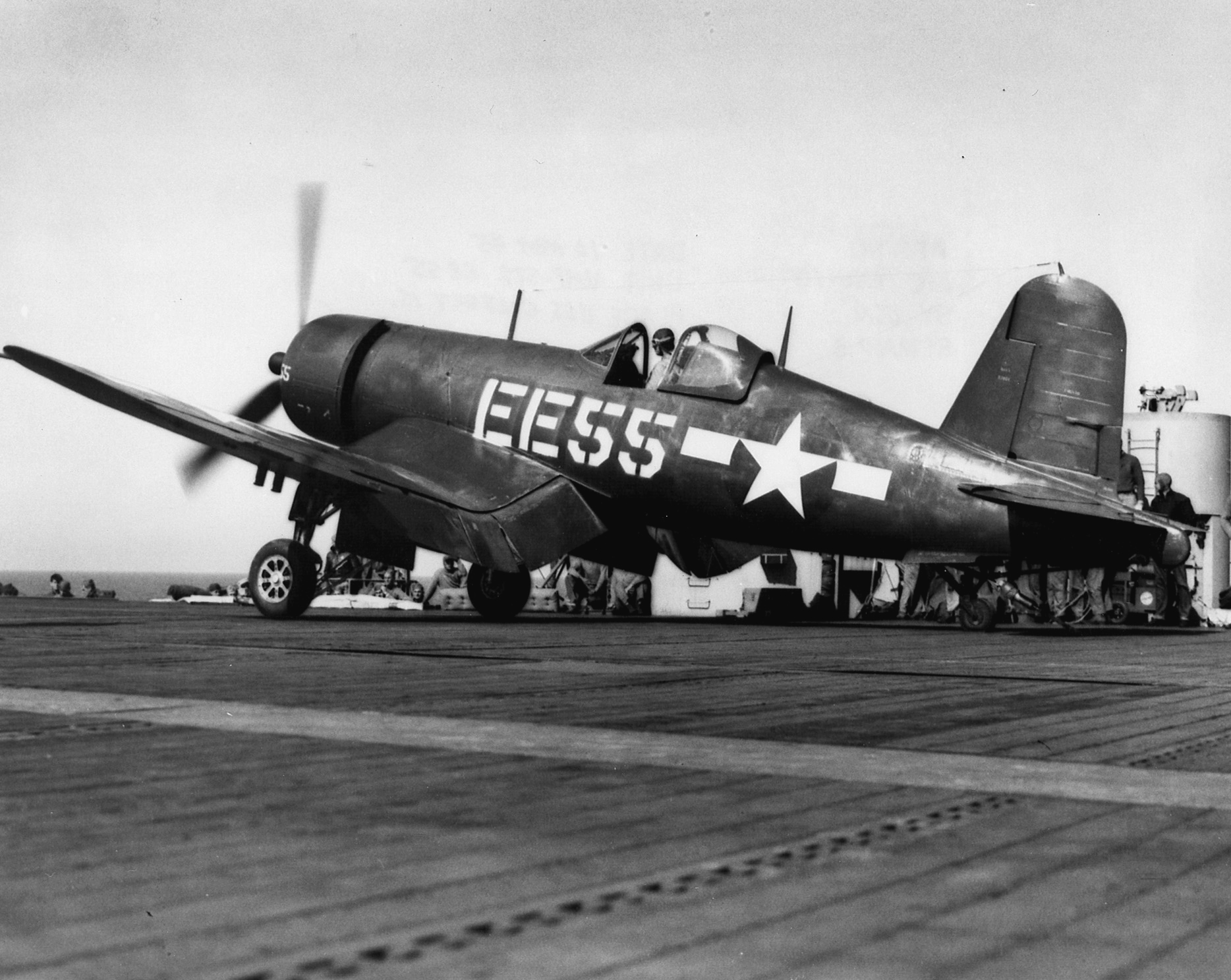
F4U-1D Corsair of VMF-512 on USS Gilbert Islands in 1945

On 17 May, the ship sortied for the Ryukyu Islands to join the fleet, then in the midst of the Battle of Okinawa. She arrived there and joined Task Unit 52.1.1. on 21 May. Gilbert Islands spent the following three days contributing her fighters to the combat air patrol, while her TBMs were employed on anti-submarine patrols. As the pilots got acclimated to combat missions, they began to be used to escort aerial attacks and performing strikes on Japanese positions on the island. Over the course of the rest of the month, her aircraft attacked numerous defensive positions, particularly around Shuri Castle in southern Okinawa, as the marines fought their way across the island. One of her aircraft shot down a Mitsubishi Ki-46 reconnaissance aircraft, which proved to be the only aerial victory any of the ship's pilots claimed during the war. During these operations, she lost only a single Corsair, which crashed after the pilot turned too low to the water.

On 1 June, Gilbert Islands was transferred to Task Unit 32.1.3, and she spent the next two weeks carrying out repeated, heavy strikes on the nearby Sakishima Islands—particularly Ishigaki Island, Irabu Island, and Miyako-jima—in an attempt to neutralize airfields there to prevent the Japanese from intervening in the fighting on Okinawa. In addition, the aviators attacked other critical infrastructure, such as radio and radar stations, harbor facilities, barracks, and villages. During these raids, two aircraft were shot down and a further two were badly damaged and forced to ditch at sea near Gilbert Islands. In total, five men were killed in the attacks.

==== Later operations ====
On 16 June, Gilbert Islands left the Okinawa area, bound for San Pedro Bay in the Philippines for a period of rest and replenishment. Over the course of the following five days, the ship's crew loaded fuel, munitions for her aircraft, other ammunition, and other supplies. They also made repairs to the ship's machinery, necessitated by heavy use in the fighting off Okinawa over the past month. On 26 June, she sortied in company with the escort carriers Suwanee and Block Island to raid Japanese positions in the occupied Dutch East Indies. Their attacks began on 30 June, and were coordinated to support the impending Australian invasion at Balikpapan. By 4 July, the Australians had secured the area, but in the course of the fighting, one of Gilbert Islands' Hellcats was shot down by Japanese anti-aircraft fire. The carriers then left for the Philippines, arriving back in San Pedro Bay on 6 July.

Gilbert Island remained in San Pedro Bay for almost the rest of the month to rest her crew. On 29 July, she got underway again to return to operations with the main fleet, which had shifted from Okinawa to the Japan campaign. Gilbert Island was assigned to cover the fleet's logistics train that kept the rest of Third Fleet in operations off the coast of Japan. From 10 to 12 August, she and several other vessels had to withdraw temporarily to avoid a typhoon that was passing through the area. On 15 August, she joined Task Group 30.8, and that morning Japan announced it would surrender, ending the fighting. The ship was detached from TG 30.8 on 2 September, the day Japan formally surrendered, and Gilbert Islands thereafter returned to Okinawa. She stayed there for about six weeks before departing for Formosa, where she covered elements of the Chinese Nationalist Army's 70th Army as they landed on the island at Keelung to retake control from the defeated Japanese. Gilbert Islands then sailed for Saipan in the Mariana Islands to embark passengers returning to the United States, before continuing on to Pearl Harbor and ultimately San Diego, arriving there on 4 December. In the course of her career during World War II, the ship received three battle stars.

=== Atlantic Fleet operations ===
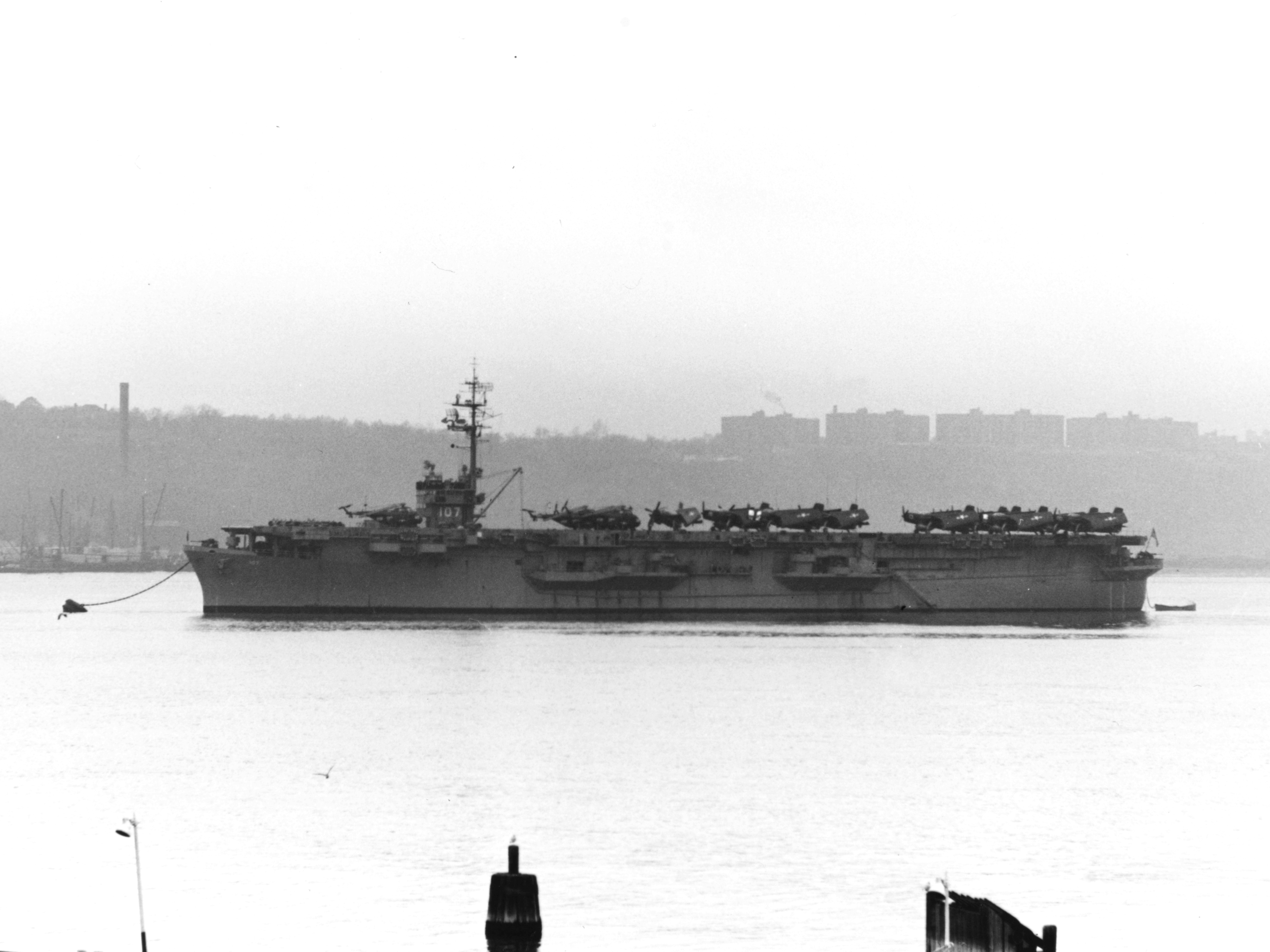
USS Gilbert Islands moored off New York City on 10 November 1953

On 21 January 1946, Gilbert Islands departed San Diego, having been ordered to move to the Atlantic Fleet. She arrived in her new home port, Norfolk, Virginia, on 7 February. She was decommissioned there on 21 May and allocated to the Atlantic Reserve Fleet. In November 1949, she was towed to the Inactive Ship Facility in Philadelphia. The ship remained out of service until the outbreak of the Korean War in June 1950 drastically increased the Navy's need for warships. Gilbert Islands was recommissioned on 7 September 1951, and moved to the Boston Naval Shipyard in November for an overhaul to prepare her for active service. On 1 August 1952, she was finally ready to join the Atlantic Fleet. Her first mission began eight days later, when she departed to ferry a group of jet aircraft to Yokohama, Japan; she arrived there on 18 September. She arrived in Quonset Point, Rhode Island, on 22 October; this was now her new home port.

On 5 January 1953, the ship sailed for a training cruise to the West Indies; she patrolled off the East Coast of the United States for much of the rest of the year. Late in 1953, she cruised in Canadian waters and visited Halifax, after which she returned to Boston for an overhaul. On 5 January 1954, she departed for a cruise across the Atlantic and into the Mediterranean Sea that lasted for two months. She arrived back in Quonset Point on 12 March, where she embarked on training exercises for reserve crews. On 9 June, she conducted the first experimental tests of operating jet aircraft, though these consisted of brief touch-and-go landings.

On 25 June, she sailed from Rhode Island, bound for Boston, where she was decommissioned again on 11 January 1955 and returned to the Atlantic Reserve Fleet. By this time, the Navy had begun replacing the Commencement Bay-class ships with much larger Essex-class aircraft carriers, since the former were too small to operate newer and more effective anti-submarine patrol planes. Proposals to radically rebuild the Commencement Bays either with an angled flight deck and various structural improvements or lengthen their hulls by 30 ft (9.1 m) and replace their propulsion machinery to increase speed came to nothing, as they were deemed to be too expensive. On 7 May 1959, she was reclassified as an aircraft ferry with the hull number AKV-39. She remained in the Navy's inventory until 1 June 1961, when she was struck from the Naval Vessel Register.

=== As Annapolis ===
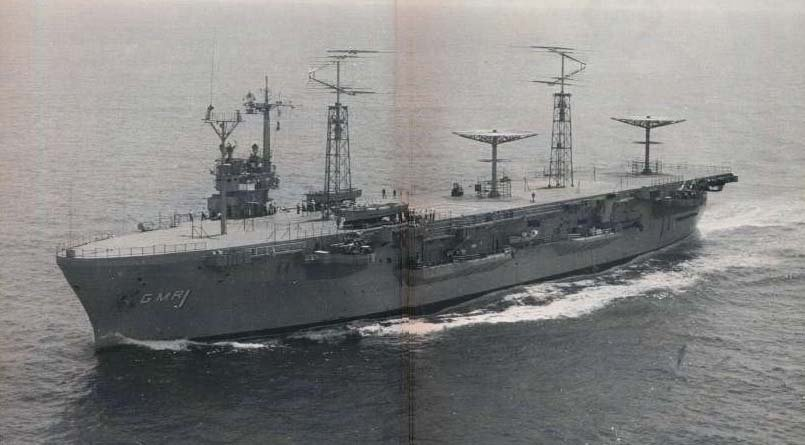
Annapolis operating during the Vietnam War

In November 1961, Gilbert Islands was instated to the Naval Vessel Register, but she remained out of service. On 1 June 1963, she was reclassified as a communications relay ship with the hull number AGMR-1. She was renamed Annapolis on 22 June and was recommissioned on 7 March 1964. The purpose of the ship was to serve as a mobile command and control station to coordinate with ground forces in regions where the Navy had no existing communications infrastructure. She was extensively reconstructed for this purpose, receiving thirty radio transmitters, five antenna towers, and teletype equipment. One of the main benefits Annapolis provided was significantly greater capacity to route radio frequencies during crises, since the volume of radio traffic frequently overwhelmed the radio frequencies that were available on normal ship-to-ship and ship-to-shore equipment. The ship underwent acceptance trials in 1964 that included trial of her new systems during Operation Steel Pike, which saw a combined Spanish and American fleet of some eighty ships operate in joint training maneuvers. She was pronounced ready for active service with the Atlantic Fleet on 16 December 1964.

Annapolis spent the first half of 1965 participating in routine training operations on the East Coast, operating out of Norfolk. On 28 June, she was transferred to the Pacific Fleet, based in Long Beach, California. By September, she was ready to deploy to Southeast Asia as part of Seventh Fleet to support the forces then fighting the Vietnam War. In addition to communications support, the ship also assisted with cryptographic work. The ship was awarded a Meritorious Unit Commendation for her service during the period from 9 January 1967 to 29 January 1968. She remained on station in the region for four years, during which time she made periodic visits to Hong Kong, Formosa, and the Philippines to provide periods of rest for her crew. She also underwent overhauls at Yokosuka. On 9 April 1969, she left East Asia to return to the United States. During her four years supporting forces in the Vietnam War, she was awarded eight battle stars.

Rather than cross the Pacific, Annapolis sailed west, passing through the Indian Ocean an stopping in Mauritius and Portuguese Angola in early May. She rounded the Cape of Good Hope and stopped in Dakar, Senegal, before crossing the equator on 19 May. She continued north to Lisbon, Portugal, and Rota, Spain, and then entered the Mediterranean to operate with Sixth Fleet for two months. She finally departed for the United States on 29 August, stopping first at Norfolk and then arriving in Philadelphia on 1 October. The ship was decommissioned there on 20 December and returned to the Atlantic Reserve Fleet. She was struck from the Naval Vessel Register a second time, on 15 October 1972, but lingered on until 19 December 1979, when she was sold to the Union Minerals & Alloys Corp. to be broken up.

== Gallery ==
USS Gilbert Islands Lifecycle

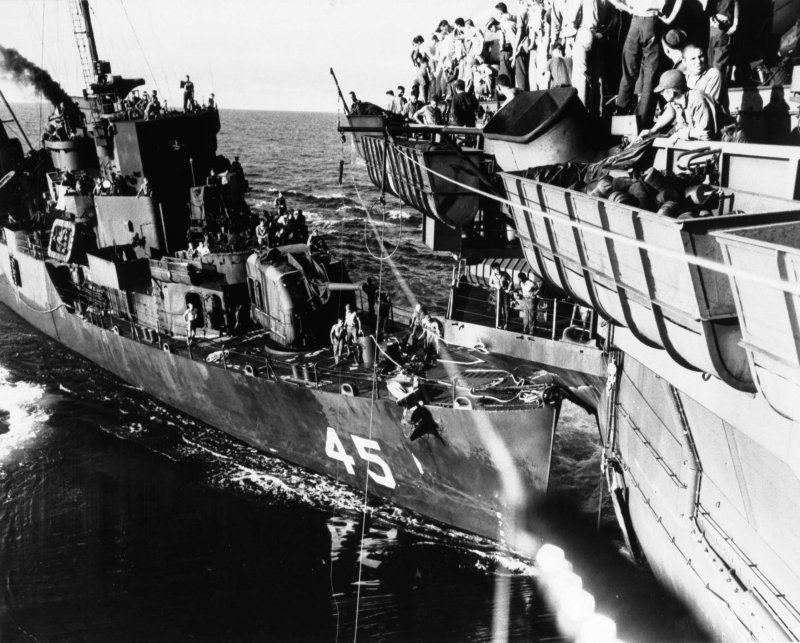
USS Lee Fox (APD-45) after colliding with USS Gilbert Islands in 1945.

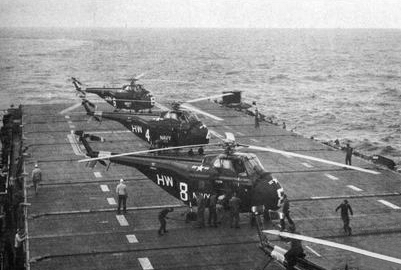
Sikorsky HO4S of HS-3 aboard USS Gilbert Islands in 1954.

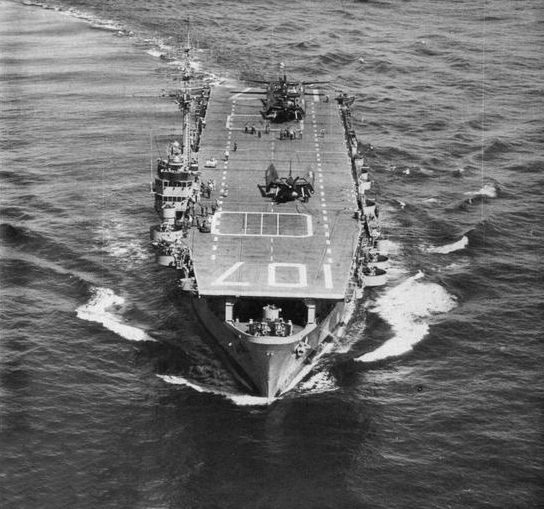
Bow view of USS Gilbert Islands in 1954.

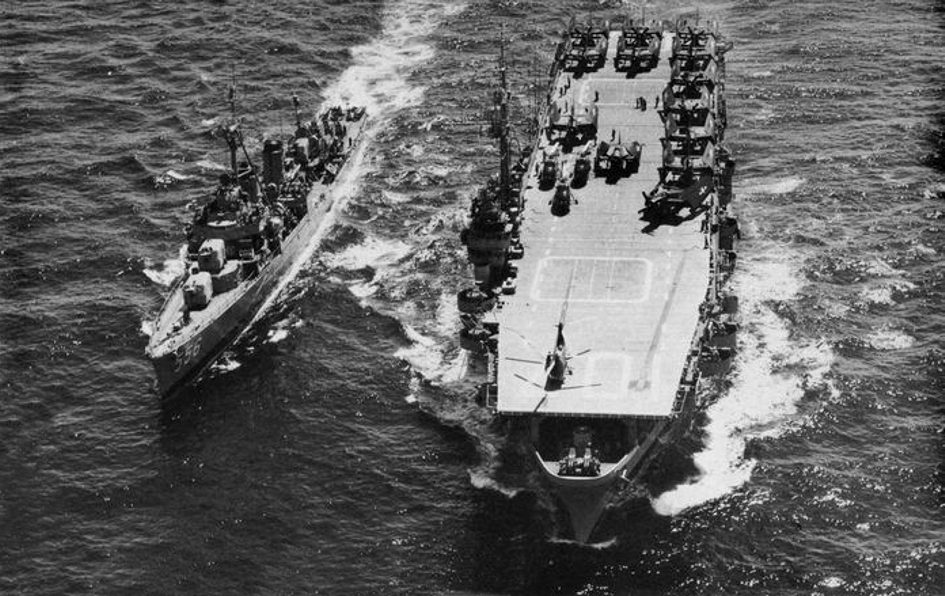
USS Gilbert Islands and USS Hailey (DD-556) underway at sea in 1954.

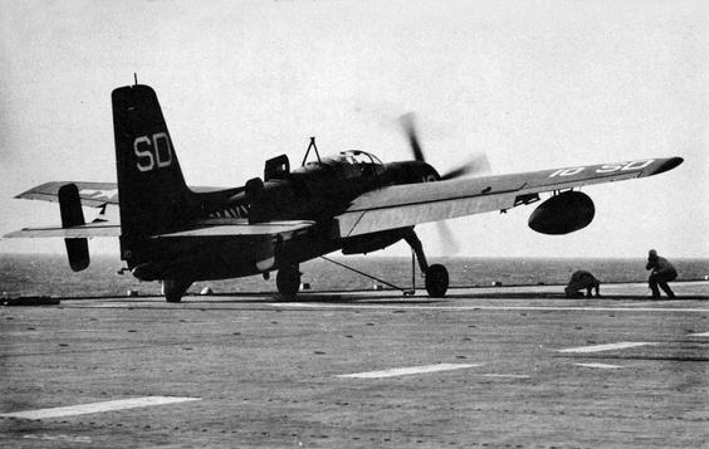
Grumman AF-2S of VS-36 is launched from USS Gilbert Islands in 1954.
