= Project Danny =

- Operational scope: Operation Crossbow
- Planned: briefed at Pentagon in July 1944
- Planned by: Naval Air Atlantic Staff
- Objective: German V-1 flying bomb launch sites in Northern France
- Executed by: never executed, planned for United States Marine Corps

Project Danny was a World War II plan for United States Marine Corps F4U Corsair fighter aircraft to attack German V-1 flying bomb launch sites in northern France. Although the squadrons had been trained at Marine Corps Air Station Cherry Point and were loading onto their escort carriers for the trip to the North Atlantic, opposition from General Marshall meant that the operation was canceled before departing for the European Theater.

== Chronology ==
Extensive land-based Combined Bomber Offensive bombings of German targets had begun in June 1943, followed by "Crossbow" operations attacking German long range weapon facilities in August 1943 and V-1 launch sites in December 1943. In July 1944 after the V-1 "Robot Blitz" had begun on 13 June, Commander Thomas Hinman Moorer of the Naval Air Atlantic Staff (NavAirLant) provided a Pentagon briefing on a June 1944 plan for F4U squadrons of Marine Air Group 51 (MAG-51) (including VMF-511, VMF-512, VMF-513 and VMF-514) to attack V-1 launch sites from escort carriers in the North Sea with Tiny Tim rockets. The Tiny Tim was a rocket-powered adaption of a 500 lb (230 kg) bomb - each aircraft carrying a single rocket. The plan was disapproved. Project Danny was a victim of the intense interservice rivalry that existed in the US armed forces during World War II; Army Chief of Staff General George Marshall stood up and walked out of the briefing: "That's the end of this briefing. As long as I'm in charge there'll never be a Marine in Europe."

Had the operation proceeded, MAG-51 would have been the second Marine Corsair squadron to deploy from aircraft carriers, the first being a photo detachment aboard the escort carrier USS Nassau in the Aleutians in 1943.

The only contribution the United States Navy did make to Crossbow operations were the Operation Anvil drone attacks on Crossbow sites in August 1944 using surplus bomber aircraft converted to radio-control bombs.

== See also ==
- United States Marine Corps Aviation
