= VMA-144 =

Marine Attack Squadron 144
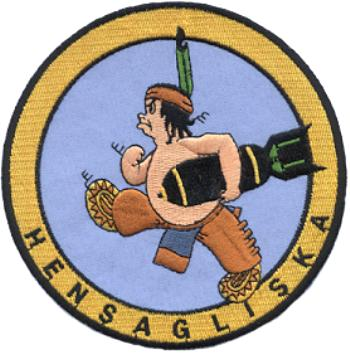
- VMSB/VMTB-144 Insignia
- Active: 7 September 1942 - 9 December 1945; Unknown - 31 Oct 1965
- Country: United States
- Branch: USMC
- Type: Fighter squadron
- Role: Close air support Air interdiction
- Part of: Inactive
- Nickname(s): Hensagliska (In Sioux this translates to "Little Warrior, Brave Warrior")
- Tail Code: 6F
- Engagements: World War II * Battle of Guadalcanal * Bougainville campaign (1943-1945)

Aircraft flown
- Attack: Douglas A-4 Skyhawk
- Bomber: Douglas SBD Dauntless; Grumman TBF Avenger

Marine Attack Squadron 144 (VMA-144) was a reserve Douglas A-4 Skyhawk attack squadron in the United States Marine Corps. Originally known as VMSB-144, the squadron saw its first combat in World War II as part of the Cactus Air Force during the Battle of Guadalcanal and also provided close air support during the Bougainville campaign (1943-1945). Following the war the squadron was deactivated but later became part of the Marine Air Reserve and was based out of Naval Air Station Jacksonville and then Naval Air Station Cecil Field, Florida.

== History ==
=== World War II ===
Marine Scout Bomber Squadron 144 (VMSB-144) was formed at Naval Air Station San Diego on 7 September 1942. They remained in California for training until early 1943 when they departed for the South Pacific, travelling through Noumea and Efate, where the ground echelon remained. The squadron's flight echelon landed at Henderson Field on Guadalcanal on 5 February 1943. They returned from their first combat tour on 12 March 1943. The entire squadron returned to Guadalcanal on 13 June 1943. The flight echelon moved to the Russell Islands for the month of July, returning to Henderson Field and then moving to Efate again. The squadron's flight echelon moved to Munda on 15 October 1943 and from 1 November to 21 November, they provided close air support to troops during the Battle of Bougainville. On 12 January 1944, the squadron boarded ship to begin their return to the United States.

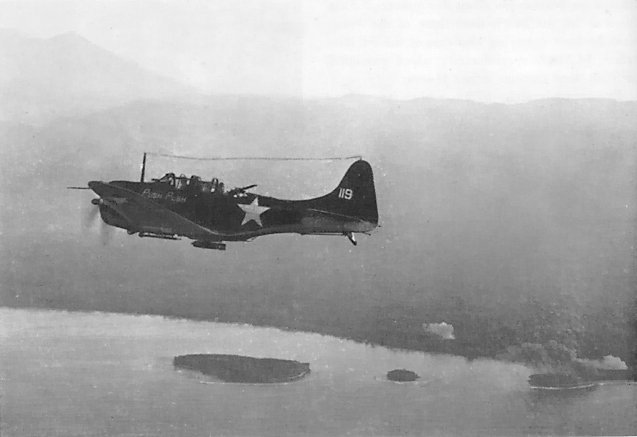
A VMSB-144 Douglas SBD Dauntless over the landing beach at Torokina.

The squadron relocated to Marine Corps Air Station El Toro, California and was redesignated as Marine Torpedo Bomber Squadron 144 (VMTB-144) on 14 October 1944. A month later, on 5 November, they were again redesignated as VMTB-144(CVS) as they trained to operate from the Navy's escort carriers. In December 1944, the squadron moved to Marine Corps Air Station Mojave, California to continue training. During this time their designation was also reverted to VMTB-144. In June 1945, VMTB-144 moved to Marine Corps Air Station Santa Barbara, California where they stayed until 12 August 1945 when they reported aboard the USS Salerno Bay. Following the end of the war, the squadron returned to Marine Corps Air Station Miramar and was deactivated on 9 December 1945

=== Reserve years ===
Sometime after the war, the squadron was reactivated as Marine Attack Squadron 144 (VMA-144) and were part of the Marine Air Reserve and based out of Naval Air Station Jacksonville and then Naval Air Station Cecil Field, Florida. The squadron was decommissioned on 31 October 1965.

== See also ==
- United States Marine Corps Aviation
- List of active United States Marine Corps aircraft squadrons
- List of decommissioned United States Marine Corps aircraft squadrons
