= Francis Cogswell =

United States Navy officer (1887–1939)

- Born: August 19, 1887; Portsmouth, New Hampshire, US
- Died: September 22, 1939 (aged 52); Bremerton, Washington, US
- Burial place: Arlington National Cemetery
- Relatives: Rear Admiral James Kelsey Cogswell (father)
- Military career
- Allegiance: United States
- Branch: United States Navy
- Service years: 1903–1939
- Rank: Captain
- Commands: USS Fanning; USS McDougal; USS Oglala
- Conflicts: World War I
- Awards: Navy Cross

Francis Cogswell (19 August 1887 – 22 September 1939) was a captain in the United States Navy who served in World War I and was a Navy Cross recipient.

== Early life ==
Cogswell was born on 19 August 1887 in Portsmouth, New Hampshire, the son of Rear Admiral James Kelsey Cogswell, who served during the Spanish–American War in 1898.

== U.S. Navy career ==
Cogswell was appointed to the United States Naval Academy in 1903 and graduated in 1908. He was awarded the Navy Cross for service during World War I, when he commanded the destroyers USS Fanning and USS McDougal. Cogswell's Navy Cross citation reads:

The Navy Cross is awarded to Lieutenant Commander Francis Cogswell, U.S. Navy, for distinguished service in the line of his profession as commanding officer of the U.S.S. Fanning and the U.S.S. McDougal, engaged in the important, exacting and hazardous duty of patrolling the waters infested with enemy submarines and mines, in escorting and protecting vitally important convoys of troops and supplies through these waters, and in offensive and defensive action, vigorously and unremittingly prosecuted against all forms of enemy naval activity.

In 1935, Cogswell commanded the minelayer USS Oglala, the flagship of a flotilla of minesweepers assisting the United States Coast and Geodetic Survey in charting the Aleutian Islands.

Cogswell was naval attaché in Paris, France, in the late 1930s.

Cogswell died at Puget Sound Naval Hospital in Bremerton, Washington, on 22 September 1939.

== Personal life ==
Cogswell married Grace Woodman Phillips (1887–1971) of New York City. She had previously been married to pioneer aviator Henry Post, who died in an air crash in 1914 after establishing a new altitude record. She worked for the United States Foreign Service and later for the Central Intelligence Agency until her retirement in 1954. They had no children.

== USS Cogswell ==
USS Cogswell (DD-651), a United States Navy Fletcher-class destroyer that served in World War II, the Korean War, and the Vietnam War, was named in honor of both Cogswell and his father.
