= James Kelsey Cogswell =

- Born: September 27, 1847; Milwaukee, Wisconsin, US
- Died: August 12, 1908 (aged 60); Jacksonville, Florida, US
- Relatives: Captain Francis Cogswell (son)
- Military career
- Allegiance: United States
- Branch: United States Navy
- Service years: 1868–1908
- Rank: Rear Admiral
- Conflicts: Spanish–American War

James Kelsey Cogswell (September 27, 1847 – August 12, 1908) was an admiral in the United States Navy who served in Spanish–American War.

== Early life ==
Cogswell was born in Milwaukee, Wisconsin, on September 27, 1847, the son of George Cogswell and Celestia A. Stone.

== Naval career ==
He graduated from the Naval Academy in 1868.

Cogswell was executive officer of the battleship Oregon during the Spanish–American War. He was aboard the Oregon during the historic dash around Cape Horn to join the North Atlantic Squadron in time to contribute to the destruction of the Spanish Fleet at the Battle of Santiago de Cuba in 1898. For eminent and conspicuous conduct in that decisive battle he was promoted to Commander.

Rear Admiral Cogswell died at South Jacksonville, Florida, on August 12, 1908.

== Personal life ==
Cogswell's son Captain Francis Cogswell was also a US Navy officer. Cogswell's sister Bianca Cogswell was married to Senator John L. Mitchell, the father of General Billy Mitchel John Lendrum Mitchel was the son of Alexander Mitchell. James Kelsey Cogswell also had a sister names Catherine Celeste Cogswell whom was born when James K Cogswell went to war. Catherine Celeste Cogswell became a star and performed in many high class stage shows. George Cogswell's obituary mentions her. George Cogswell passed away before James K. Cogswell made it out of war. James K Cogswell sent a letter to the newspaper to tell his parents he had made it out alive (it was published in the newspaper in the hometown he was from) his father died a few days prior before the letter was published to see he was okay. He never found out his son made it out alive. [Obituary of Catherine Celeste Cogswell Thorne] [Obituary of George Cogswell] [obituary of Alexander Mitchell]

== USS Cogswell ==
The USS Cogswell (DD-651) was a Fletcher-class destroyer in the United States Navy, serving in World War II, the Korean War, and the Vietnam War. The ship is named in honour of Rear Admiral James Kelsey Cogswell, and his son, Captain Francis Cogswell.
