= USS Salerno Bay =

Commencement Bay-class escort carrier of the US Navy

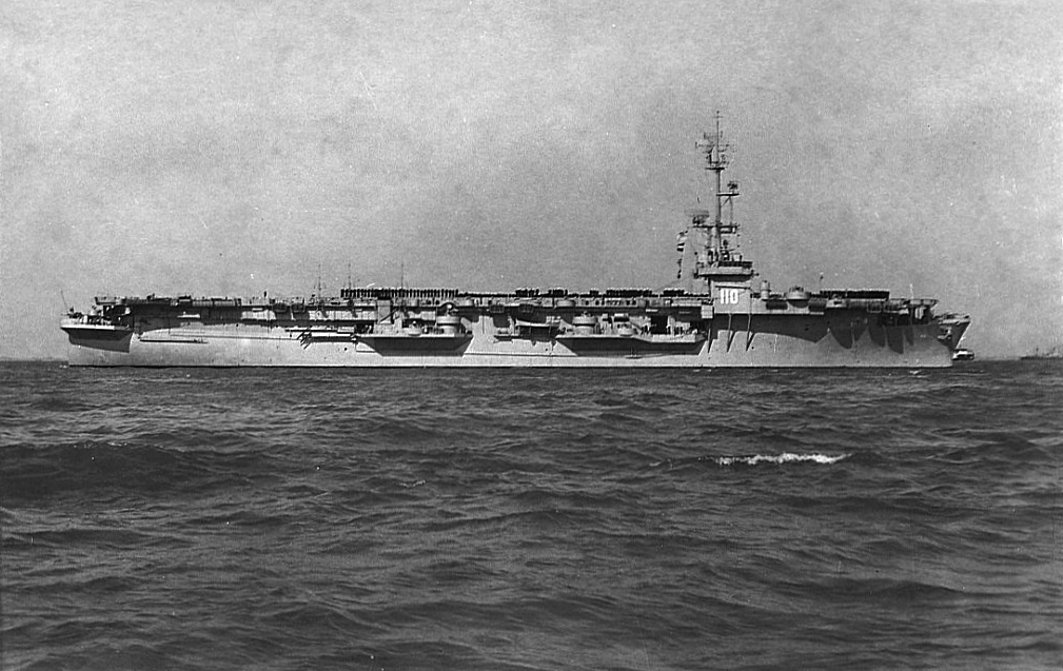
- USS Salerno Bay in the early 1950s

History

United States
- Name: USS Salerno Bay
- Namesake: Landings at Salerno, Italy
- Builder: Seattle-Tacoma Shipbuilding Corporation
- Laid down: 7 February 1944
- Launched: 26 September 1944
- Commissioned: 19 May 1945
- Decommissioned: 16 February 1954
- Stricken: 1 June 1961
- Fate: Scrapped, 1962

General characteristics
- Class & type: Commencement Bay-class escort carrier
- Displacement: 21,397 long tons (21,740 t)
- Length: 557 ft 1 in (169.80 m) loa
- Beam: 75 ft (23 m)
- Draft: 32 ft (9.8 m)
- Installed power: 16,000 shp (12,000 kW); 4 × boilers
- Propulsion: 2 × Steam turbines; 2 × screw propellers
- Speed: 19 knots (35 km/h; 22 mph)
- Complement: 1,066
- Armament: 2 × 5 in (127 mm) dual-purpose guns; 36 × 40 mm (1.6 in) Bofors AA guns; 20 × 20 mm (0.8 in) Oerlikon AA guns
- Aircraft carried: 33
- Aviation facilities: 2 × aircraft catapults

USS Salerno Bay (ex-Winjah Bay) was a Commencement Bay-class escort carrier built by Seattle-Tacoma Shipbuilding Corporation for the United States Navy during World War II. The Commencement Bay class were built during World War II, and were an improvement over the earlier Sangamon class, which were converted from oil tankers. They were capable of carrying an air group of 33 planes and were armed with an anti-aircraft battery of 5 in (127 mm), 40 mm (1.6 in), and 20 mm (0.8 in) guns. The ships were capable of a top speed of 19 knots (35 km/h; 22 mph), and due to their origin as tankers, had extensive fuel storage.

== Design ==
In 1941, as United States participation in World War II became increasingly likely, the US Navy embarked on a construction program for escort carriers, which were converted from transport ships of various types. Many of the escort carrier types were converted from C3-type transports, but the Sangamon-class escort carriers were instead rebuilt oil tankers. These proved to be very successful ships, and the Commencement Bay class, authorized for Fiscal Year 1944, were an improved version of the Sangamon design. The new ships were faster, had improved aviation facilities, and had better internal compartmentation. They proved to be the most successful of the escort carriers, and the only class to be retained in active service after the war, since they were large enough to operate newer aircraft.

Salerno Bay was 557 ft 1 in (169.80 m) long overall, with a beam of 75 ft (23 m) at the waterline, which extended to 105 ft 2 in (32.05 m) at maximum. She displaced 21,397 long tons (21,740 t) at full load, of which 12,876 long tons (13,083 t) could be fuel oil (though some of her storage tanks were converted to permanently store seawater for ballast), and at full load she had a draft of 27 ft 11 in (8.51 m). The ship's superstructure consisted of a small island. She had a complement of 1,066 officers and enlisted men.

The ship was powered by two Allis-Chalmers geared steam turbines, each driving one screw propeller, using steam provided by four Combustion Engineering-manufactured water-tube boilers. The propulsion system was rated to produce a total of 16,000 shp (12,000 kW) for a top speed of 19 knots (35 km/h; 22 mph). Given the very large storage capacity for oil, the ships of the Commencement Bay class could steam for some 23,900 nautical miles (44,300 km; 27,500 mi) at a speed of 15 knots (28 km/h; 17 mph).

Her defensive anti-aircraft armament consisted of two 5 in (127 mm) dual-purpose guns in single mounts, thirty-six 40 mm (2 in) Bofors guns, and twenty 20 mm (1 in) Oerlikon light AA cannons. The Bofors guns were placed in three quadruple and twelve twin mounts, while the Oerlikon guns were all mounted individually. She carried 33 planes, which could be launched from two aircraft catapults. Two elevators transferred aircraft from the hangar to the flight deck.

== Service history ==
=== World War II ===
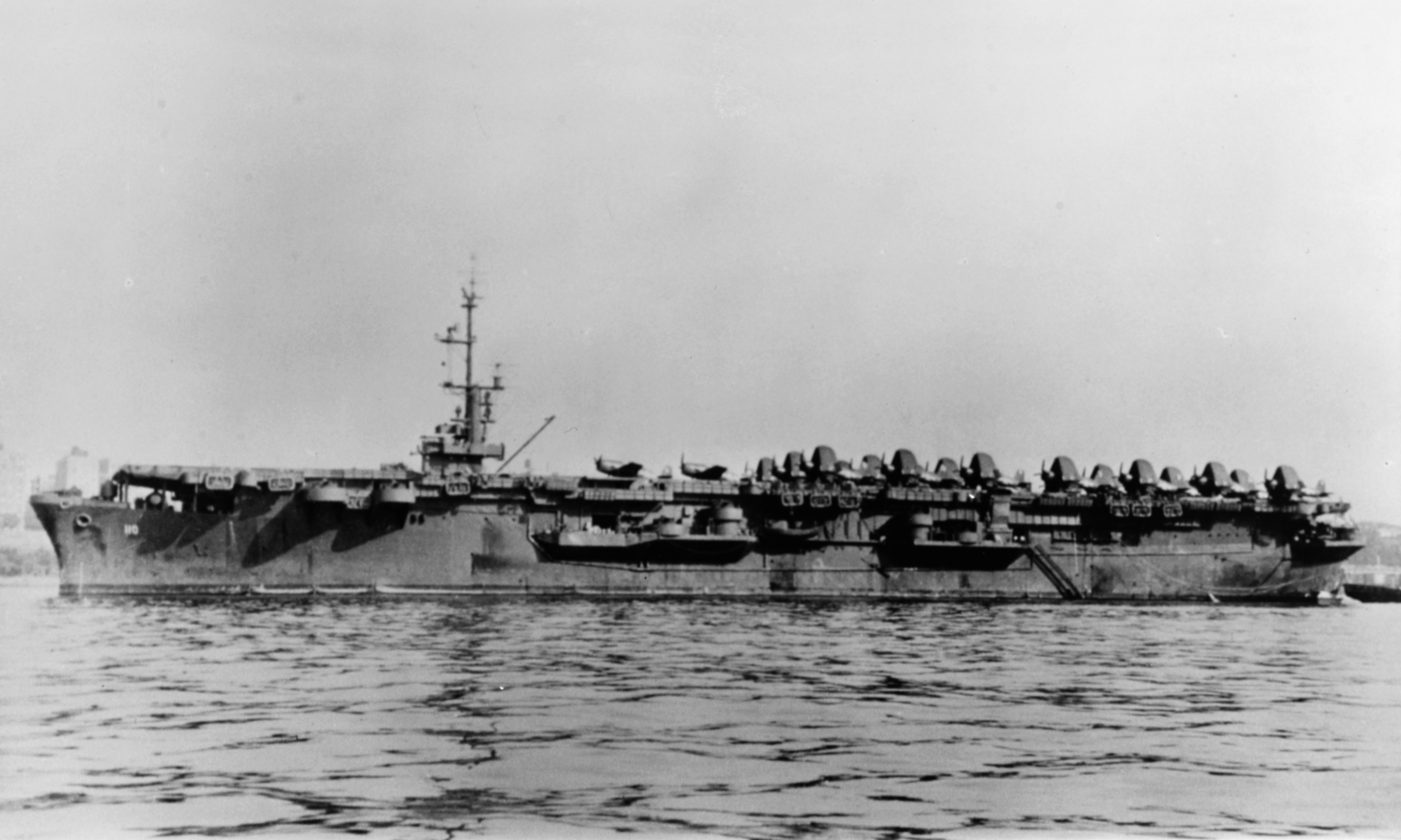
Salerno off New York City in May 1946

The first fifteen ships of the Commencement Bay class were ordered on 23 January 1943, allocated to Fiscal Year 1944. The ship, originally named Winjah Bay, was built at the Todd-Pacific Shipyards in Tacoma, Washington. She was laid down on 7 February 1944, and during construction, she was renamed Salerno Bay, after the invasion of Salerno in Sicily the previous year. Salerno Bay was launched on 26 September and three days later, was moved to the Commercial Iron Works of Portland, Oregon, to complete fitting out. The ship was commissioned into active service on 19 May 1945. Toward the end of June, Salerno Bay embarked Marine Carrier Group 5, which consisted of fighter squadron VMF-514 and torpedo bomber squadron VTMB-144. She then cruised off southern California for training exercises before deploying to combat theaters in the western Pacific.

On 17 August, two days after Japan announced it would surrender, Salerno Bay left California. Since the war was now over, she embarked the composite squadron VC-68 to transport it overseas. She stopped in Hawaii on the way, where she conducted training exercises for her marine aviators. She eventually arrived in Buckner Bay, Okinawa, on 21 September, and later moved to Hagushi. In early October, an approaching typhoon forced her to go to sea to avoid bring driven ashore by the strong winds. She arrived back in Hagushi on 12 October, but departed two days later as part of the fleet covering the Chinese Nationalist force that moved to Formosa to take control of the island from the defeated Japanese. Salerno Bay then departed the western Pacific, bound for Saipan in the Mariana Islands, where she stayed for three weeks. She then moved to nearby Guam and embarked American service members to take them back to the United States. She sailed back to San Diego, by way of Pearl Harbor, arriving in early December.

=== Atlantic Fleet service ===
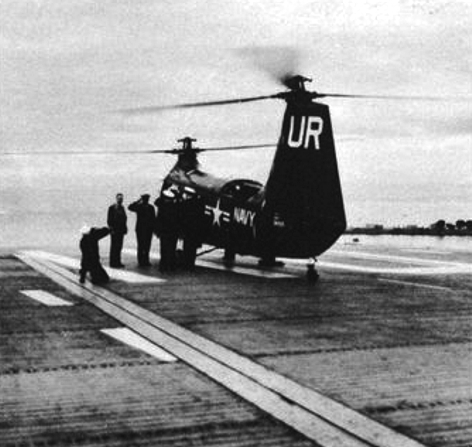
A Piasecki HUP Retriever aboard Salerno Bay in 1952

In mid-December, Salerno Bay was assigned to the Atlantic Fleet; she departed for the East Coast of the United States soon thereafter, passed through the Panama Canal, and arrived in her new home port at Norfolk, Virginia, on 23 December. In her new assignment, she was tasked with training new carrier pilots and qualifying them for carrier operations. She spent 1946 and into 1947 cruising off the East Coast, as far south as the Caribbean Sea, performing her training duties. In early 1947, the Navy ordered Salerno Bay to be laid up in reserve; in June, she moved from Norfolk to Boston, where the work to preserve the ship for a lengthy period out of service was done. She was decommissioned on 4 October and allocated to the Atlantic Reserve Fleet, where she remained until 20 June 1951, when she was recommissioned.

After returning to active service, she conducted a shakedown cruise before joining Carrier Division 18 in October. She participated in training exercises with the rest of the division off the Virginia Capes and the Caribbean in November and December. She returned to Norfolk on 18 December for three weeks, before getting underway again on 7 January 1952 for another training period in the Caribbean. In early February, she returned to Norfolk, but her stay there was brief. By March, she had returned to the Caribbean and was patrolling off Puerto Rico. Another training period off the Virginia Capes followed from April to July. Salerno Bay departed the East Coast on 26 August for a voyage to Europe. She joined the ships of Task Force 173 on the way, and the squadron took part in joint training maneuvers off Norway with other vessels from NATO fleets in September. Salerno Bay sailed south to Gibraltar in early October and then cruised in the Mediterranean Sea with the Sixth Fleet for the next month. In late November, she passed back through the Strait of Gibraltar, arriving back in Norfolk on 7 December. She then resumed her normal routine of training exercises off the East Coast and in the Caribbean, which lasted into 1953.

In early 1953, the Navy decided to return Salerno Bay to the reserve fleet. She returned to Boston on 8 June to be prepared for inactivation. She was decommissioned there again on 16 February 1954. By this time, the Navy had begun replacing the Commencement Bay-class ships with much larger Essex-class aircraft carriers, since the former were too small to operate newer and more effective anti-submarine patrol planes. Proposals to radically rebuild the Commencement Bays either with an angled flight deck and various structural improvements or lengthen their hulls by 30 ft (9.1 m) and replace their propulsion machinery to increase speed came to nothing, as they were deemed to be too expensive. In 1959, she was reclassified with the hull number AKV-10, but she remained out of service. She was struck from the Naval Vessel Register on 1 June 1961 and sold to the ship breaking firm Revalorizacion de Materiales, S.A., and handed over to be scrapped on 14 December. Salerno Bay was broken up the following year in Bilbao, Spain.
