= Margaret Cogswell =

American artist (born 1947)

- Born: 1947; Memphis, Tennessee, US
- Education: Rutgers University, Rhodes College
- Known for: Installation art, sculpture, drawing
- Notable work: River Fugues
- Awards: Guggenheim Fellowship, New York Foundation for the Arts, Pollock-Krasner Foundation
- Website: Margaret Cogswell

Margaret Cogswell, Mississippi River Fugues, installation, 2008, Art Museum of the University of Memphis.

Margaret Cogswell (born 1947) is a mixed-media installation artist and sculptor based in New York. She emerged in late 1980s as a sculptor, gaining attention for abstract constructions exploring tensions between natural and human-made materials, roughness and sophistication. Since 2003, Cogswell's work has focused on a series of site-specific installations called "River Fugues": individually unique, multimedia projects involving detailed geographical, historical and social research that explore the intertwining of rivers, industry, people's lives, and the increasingly politicized role of water. The series' title invokes the contrapuntal musical form of the fugue to indicate the weaving of disparate voices, layers and media (video, audio, sculptural elements, works on paper) into a harmonious, composite whole. Critic Lilly Wei described the "River Fugues" as a hybrid form based on musical composition that "expresses the complex beauty of rivers … and sounds an alarm over the sweeping environmental changes that have endangered our natural resources."

Cogswell has exhibited at institutions including the Centre for Fine Arts, Brussels (BOZAR), Zendai Zhujiajiao Art Museum (Shanghai), Mid-Manhattan Library, Hallwalls, Wave Hill, and the Field Museum of Natural History (Chicago). She has received a Guggenheim Fellowship and awards from the New York Foundation for the Arts and Pollock-Krasner Foundation, among others. After being based in New York City since her early career, Cogswell lives and works upstate in the Catskill Park area.

== Early life and career ==
Cogswell was born in Memphis, Tennessee) in 1947, and at age eighteen months moved with her Presbyterian missionary parents to Japan, where they lived for the next twelve years. After returning to the U.S., she missed conversing in Japanese and eventually turned to the visual arts, in part to overcome the expressive limitations of language. She majored in English literature at Rhodes College, receiving a BA degree in 1969. From 1974 to 1976, she studied sculpture at University of Hawaiʻi at Mānoa, before enrolling at the Mason Gross School of the Arts at Rutgers University, where she earned an MFA in sculpture in 1982.

Cogswell's earliest sculpture had an architectural emphasis, as in Flying Buttresses (1979), a vertical work of stacked sheets of green plate glass and black metal that recalled Gothic cathedrals; she also created site-specific installations for the dance performance, Floored (1981), by Lisa Fox at The Kitchen. In the late 1980s and early 1990s, Cogswell began receiving wider attention for abstract constructions exhibited in group shows at the World Trade Center, Korean Cultural Center, Katonah Museum of Art, and Newhouse Center for Contemporary Art, as well as for solo exhibitions in Japan and at 101 Wooster. During that time, she also began teaching studio art at State University of New York at Purchase, Parsons School of Design, and Rhode Island School of Design, among other schools.

== Work ==
Margaret Cogswell, Inside Yoknapatapha, installation, wood, steel, concrete, bluestone, beeswax and tar, 30' h x 28' x 22', 1992.

Cogswell's wide-ranging influences include modernist and postminimalist sculpture, literature and Japanese culture. She has long been interested in the relationship of images to language and poetry; her earlier work employed arrangement and juxtaposition of materials to give form to interior moments and spaces, and often provided clues to meaning through evocative titles. Her later "River Fugues" rely more on a polyphonic mix of different media rather than materials to create what writers have described as visual and aural "tone poems" investigating the changing circumstances and life of various rivers.

=== Earlier sculpture and installations ===
Cogswell's early sculpture centered on abstract constructions using basic natural and human-made materials—most often rough-hewn wood (sometimes marked with expressive chainsaw kerfs), steel plates and rods, and tension wire. This work explored the intrinsic beauty of these materials in compositions that alluded to rhythms of nature, social systems, structures and the tenuousness of life, or served as concrete expressions of emotional states (e.g., Inexplicable Longings, 1989).

Writers such as The New York Times's Michael Kimmelman commented on formal and conceptual tensions within the work: hard versus soft, smooth versus rough, light versus dark, brute versus meditative, and primitive versus sophisticated. For example, the large assemblage Weighted Planes Rise Toward a New Desire (1988) consisted of a slender, lyrical metal arch that connected a heap of metal sheets topped by an unfinished wood block with another in which the materials were reversed. ARTnews critic Eleanor Heartney suggested that Cogswell's approach to form, material and arrangement bore the influence of her time in Japan, yielding eloquent, sometimes playful works with an "uneasy tension [and] precariously maintained balance … heightened by our awareness of the very different properties of wood and steel." She described the sculpture Silenced: No Space (1990), as a "dramatic interaction" that reversed expectations by placing lengths of steel girder within the vise-like grip of two pieces of rough wood, their extremities shooting out.

Margaret Cogswell, Memento Mori, installation, straw, hair, rope, tar, plaster, steel mesh, beeswax and salt, 14' h x 20' x 26', 1993, Utatsuyama Temple, Kanazawa, Japan.

In subsequent installations, Cogswell delved into new materials and linear tensions, often created through enclosures or frames made of steel or wood. Inside Yoknapatapha (Middlebury College, 1992) was inspired by the novels of William Faulkner, and consisted of a visceral environment of five separate elements composed of wood, steel, concrete, bluestone, beeswax and tar that evoked the volatility of nature and the layerings and conflicts of societies. In works such as Memento Mori (Newhouse Center, 1995) and "The Parthenon and Other Mythologies" (Parthenon Museum, 1995), Cogswell created mysterious, shrine-like environments that incorporated hanging lengths of tarred straw rope, sheets of wire mesh covered with newspaper or prints embedded in plaster and/or wax, calligraphic knotted and unknotted ropes, and materials used in rituals, such as straw and salt. Memento Mori was recreated at the Newhouse Center after first being installed in an abandoned temple in Kanazawa, Japan. Parthenon was a collaboration with her brother, painter Jim Cogswell, that was based on the original Greek structure (and its Nashville replica) and used suspended books and records and hanging prints to represent, respectively, plumb bobs and columns. Reviews described these installations of the 1990s as poignant and raw evocations of memory, ritual and connection to the historical and mythical past.

=== "River Fugues" and water-related works ===
Cogswell first engaged the subject of water (as well as the use of sound and video) in the site-specific installations, Thirst (1999) and Thirst (Elegy for Esther) (Islip Art Museum, 2001), which respectively examined physical properties and rituals related to water. Those projects prompted her work during a 2003 SPACES World Artist Program residency in Cleveland, in which she traveled the length of the local Cuyahoga River, exploring its nature, recreational use, steel mills and other industries. Her site-specific response to that research became Cuyahoga Fugues (2003), a weaving of generations of celebratory and elegiac river stories—gathered from steel workers, environmentalists, fishermen, city planners, an historian and children—told through a deceptively simple duct work installation, video projections and captured local sounds.

The project served as a model for future River Fugues, which melded video interviews with inhabitants, imagery of each locale, and collected data and observations that Cogswell turned into darkened, "stage set"-like environments employing giant pipes and wheels, water towers and mechanical fixtures softened by the glow of video. These subsequent projects examined the lives of other rivers and their relation to society’s collective longing for prosperity, which has often involved harnessing river power for commerce and uncomfortably linking idyllic landscapes with urban industry and technology. These initial works included Hudson Weather Fugues (Wave Hill, 2005), Buffalo River Fugues (Hallwalls, 2006), and Mississippi River Fugues (Art Museum of the University of Memphis, 2008).

Margaret Cogswell, Views from a Puddle #02, watercolor and colored pencil on paper, 40" x 30", 2019.

Mississippi River Fugues juxtaposed handcrafted copper-and-tin hurricane lanterns, a large ductwork dredger sculpture, oscillating buoys throwing video and light across the walls of the museum space, and river sounds and imagery (nature, cotton harvesting, cattle). The installation was dominated by a structure based on an illustration (of men in squirrel-wheel cages powering an 18th-century river dredger) and two massive paddle-wheel forms, onto which Cogswell projected videos of men trudging on a treadmill, seemingly turning the wheels in Sisyphean labor—an allusion to the relentless drive of profit and power and technology's capacity to enhance or destroy life. Wyoming River Fugues University of Wyoming Art Museum, 2012) similarly examined relationships between the river, irrigation, farming, mining and recreation.

In later water-related projects, Cogswell's emphasis shifted toward sound, video and works on paper. "Water Soundings: Zhujiajiao River Poems," (Zhujiajiao Art Museum, 2014) combined loose, abstract drawings in watercolor, ink, pencil and collage with local sounds and musical instruments and circular or rectangular video projections: a red lantern swaying in close-up, rainwater dripping off the eaves of an old house, a man harvesting snails with a rake at sunrise, a tai chi master practicing in the early morning. "Red Hook Harbor Soundings" (Kentler International Drawing Space, 2015) incorporated audio, video, watercolor and pencil works mixing abstraction and representation that examined the vestiges of tidal flows and the beauty of disintegration found in a rotting pier, ship remnants and other detritus.

In her three "Moving The Water(s)" projects, Cogswell examined New York City's water supply, 90% of which is supplied by the Ashokan Reservoir, located at the eastern end of the Catskill Park. Ashokan Fugues (CUE Art Foundation, 2014; Kleinert/James Center for the Arts, 2016) incorporated atmospheric watercolors, sculptural components (metallic facsimiles of city water towers with translucent tanks and oversized umbrellas), and audio and video recordings of interviews with New York and Catskill residents; it served as an elegy to the unsung sacrifice of those in the Catskills who lost their homes due to the reservoir system construction. The exhibitions featured a recurrent motif of green balls that Cogswell used to animate the movement of water in videos rear-projected in the tanks and amid sculptural elements. Croton Fugues (2017), celebrated the centennial anniversary of the city's aqueduct system, employing similar motifs along with archival material in an exhibition located across the street from the original Croton Reservoir at the Mid-Manhattan Library.

== Awards ==
Cogswell has received fellowships from the ArtLab of Mt. Lake Biological Station (University of Virginia, 2019), John Simon Guggenheim Memorial Foundation (2009) and New York Foundation for the Arts (2007, 1993), and awards from the Pollock-Krasner Foundation Grants (2017, 1991, 1987), Foundation for Contemporary Arts (2014, emergency grant), Artists Space (1988–90) and Art Matters (1988). She has been awarded artist residencies from the Montello Foundation, Santa Fe Art Institute and Ucross Foundation, among others.
