= Tiny Tim (rocket) =

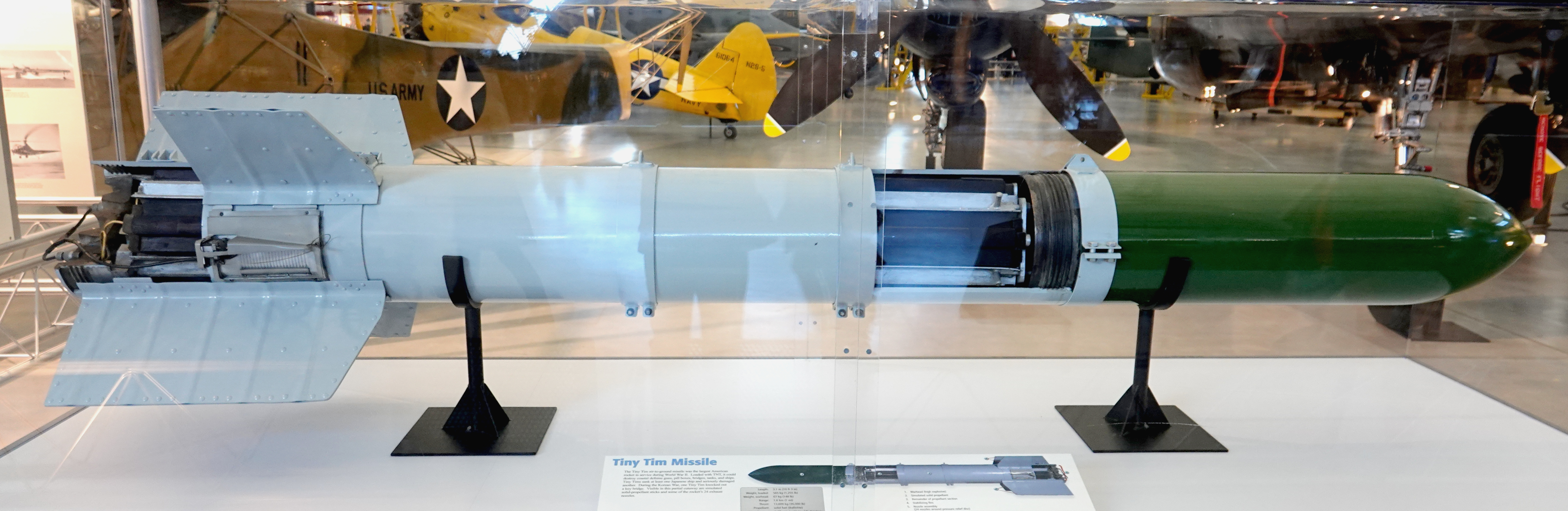
- Tiny Tim Rocket
- Type: Air-to-surface anti-ship Rocket
- Place of origin: United States

Service history
- In service: 1944-1951
- Used by: United States Navy
- Wars: World War II, Korean War

Production history
- Designer: Caltech, NOTS
- Designed: 1944

Specifications
- Mass: 1,255 lb (569 kg)
- Length: 10.25 ft (312 cm)
- Width: 36 in (91 cm) (across fins)
- Diameter: 11.75 in (29.8 cm)
- Maximum firing range: 1,600 yd (1,500 m)
- Warhead: TNT
- Warhead weight: 148.5 lb (67.4 kg)
- Engine: Solid-propellant rocket 30,000 lbf (130 kN) for 1 sec
- Maximum speed: 550 mph (245.8 m/s)

The Tiny Tim was an American air-to-ground rocket used near the end of the Second World War and during the Korean War. The Tiny Tim was also instrumental for further research in civilian and military rocketry.

== Development ==
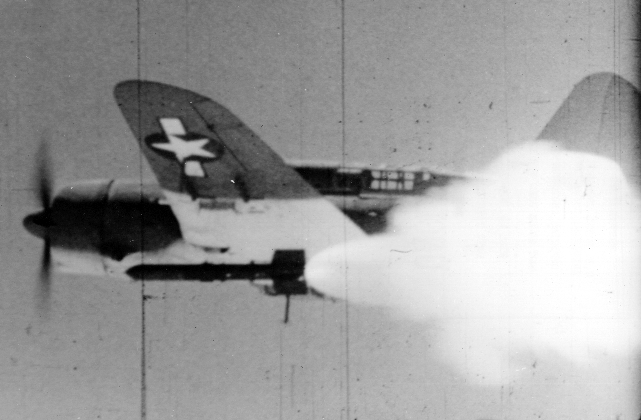
Curtiss SB2C Helldiver firing a Tiny Tim rocket

The Tiny Tim was built in response to a United States Navy requirement for an anti-ship rocket capable of hitting ships from outside of their anti-aircraft range, with a payload capable of sinking heavy shipping. The Tiny Tim was manufactured using 11.75-inch (298 mm) pipe, which was chosen because it was already being manufactured for oil well casings. This also allowed using four modified Holy Moses propellant charges, and payload adapted from 12-inch naval gun shells.

According to the China Lake Weapons Digest, the Tiny Tim was

... designed by the Caltech-China Lake team as a bunker-buster, Tim was the first large aircraft rocket, and, although it saw only limited service in WWII, it helped form the foundations of many postwar developments in rocketry.

The "Tiny Tim" name came from the fact that the drawings of the rocket, which were made without official approval, were presented to the supervisor of the design team in late December as a Christmas present.

The Tiny Tim's diameter of 11.75 in (29.8 cm) was the first Allied aerial rocket to have a larger calibre than the Luftwaffe-deployed bomber destroyer aerial rocket ordnance, the Nebelwerfer-based BR 21 of 21 cm (8-1/4 in) calibre. The Tiny Tim's large diameter allowed a sizable 148.5 lb (67.4 kg) semi-armor-piercing high-explosive warhead, some 60 lbs (27 kg) heavier than the BR 21's 40.8 kg (90 lb) warhead. The Tiny Tim had a maximum range of 1,500 meters (1,640 yards), some 100 meters greater than the BR 21's time-fuze limited 1.4 km maximum detonation range from launch.

During testing, issues with shock waves emitted by the rocket igniter were attributed to a fatal crash of a Curtiss SB2C Helldiver piloted by Lt. John M. Armitage. (Armitage Field was later named in his honor.) The issue was resolved by reducing the rocket igniter charge and releasing the Tiny Tim from the aircraft with a lanyard attached to the rocket that would snap, causing the rocket to ignite only after it had achieved sufficient separation from the aircraft. Common targets included coastal defense guns, bridges, pillboxes, tanks, and shipping. An ambitious operation to use the Tiny Tim against German V-1 sites as part of Operation Crossbow, code-named Project Danny, was planned but cancelled before the squadrons assigned could be deployed to Europe.

Common Tiny Tim delivery aircraft during World War II included the PBJ-1 Mitchell, F4U Corsair, F6F Hellcat, TBM Avenger, and the SB2C Helldiver.

After World War II, the United States Navy's rocket laboratory at Inyokern, California developed an even larger version of the Tiny Tim, called "Big Richard", which was 14 inches in diameter and one of the largest air-to-surface unguided rocket ever developed for the US military. While tested, it was never placed in production. The United States Navy also experimented with a two-stage version of the Tiny Tim, which mounted another Tiny Tim rocket motor behind a complete Tiny Tim. Like with the larger Big Richard, this "pusher" assembly was used primarily for testing, where the rocket motor would accelerate a test device to airplane-like speeds.

== Operational history ==
Tiny Tim rockets were used by the United States Navy and United States Marine Corps near the end of the war during the Battle of Okinawa, and during the Korean War.

During World War II, Tiny Tim rockets were credited with sinking one Japanese ship and severely damaging another. In the prelude to the Battle of Okinawa, Tiny Tim rockets were aboard the USS Franklin (CV-13) when it was bombed by a Japanese aircraft. The attack ignited several Tiny Tim rockets, some attached to Corsairs on the deck waiting to take off and others still in the hangar. Rockets in the hangar reportedly

... ricocheted about in the confined space and did considerable damage. One Tiny Tim warhead was not recovered from where it lodged on the third deck below the forward elevator well until the ship arrived in Ulithi. It is estimated that 13 to 16 tons of high explosives detonated progressively on the flight deck.

During the Korean war, a Tiny Tim rocket destroyed a key bridge over the Han River (Korea) near Chungju.

During the second half of the 1940s Tiny Tim also had a short civilian life, when it was modified to be used as a booster for the first U.S. sounding rocket, the WAC Corporal.

== Gallery ==
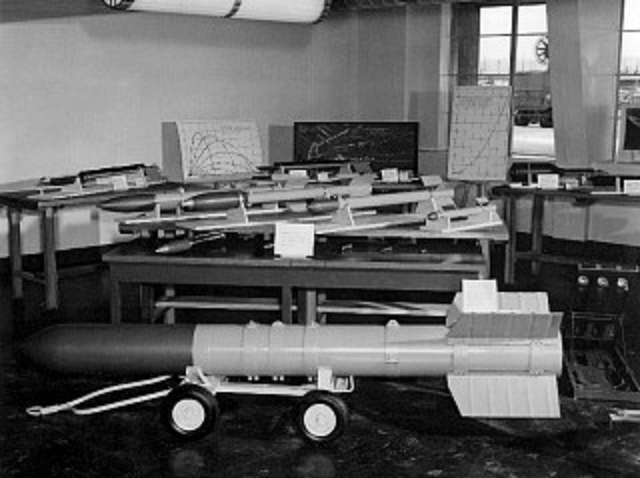
U.S. Navy rockets on display at Michelson Laboratory, NOTS China Lake

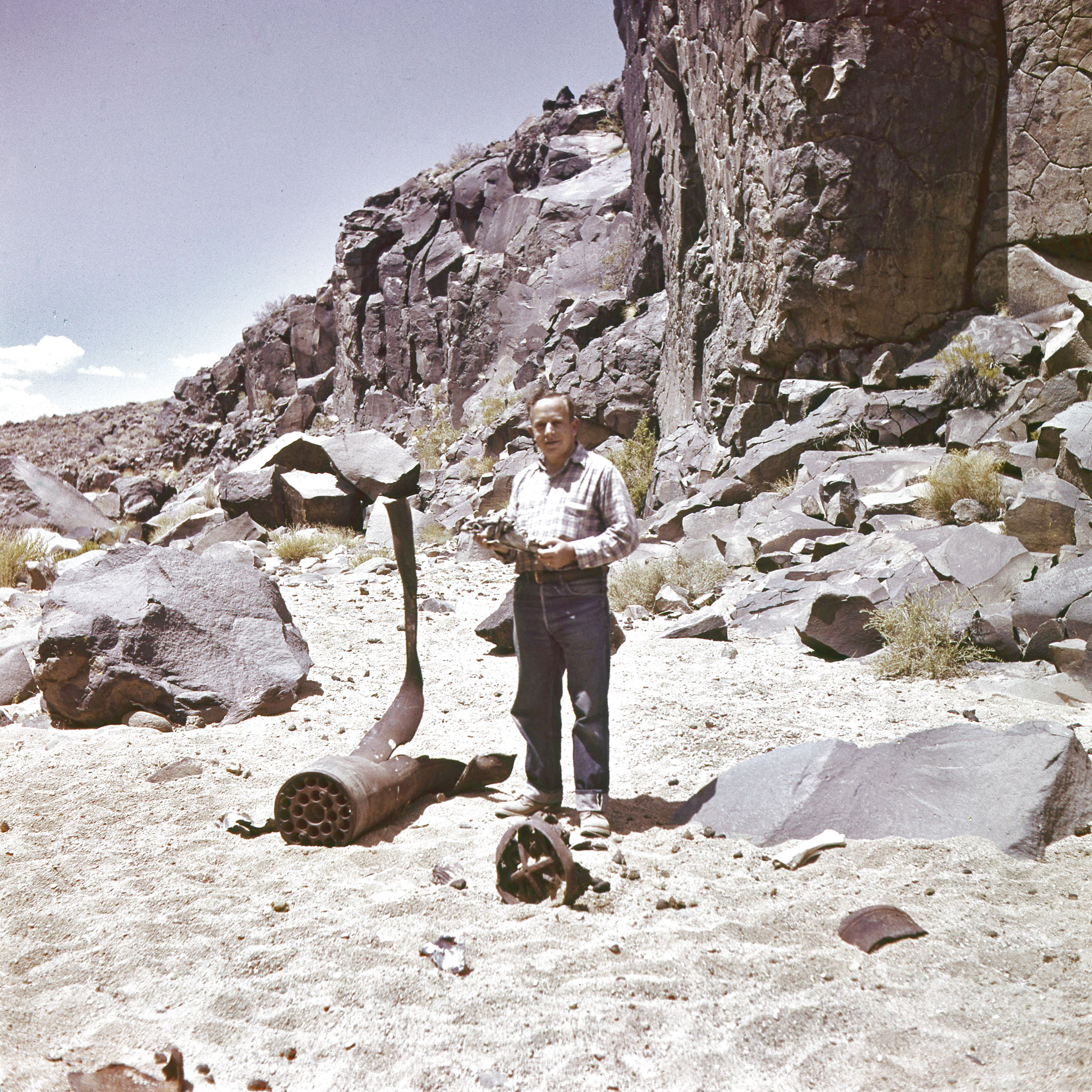
Alexis B. Dember with Tiny Tim rocket casing, Naval Air Weapons Station China Lake, 1953. Notice the 24 smaller exhaust nozzles arranged in two concentric circular patterns around the larger center exhaust nozzle.

== See also ==
- Anti-ship missile
- Rocket
- Wurfrahmen 40
- Red Angel
