= William Cogswell (disambiguation) =

William Cogswell (1838–1895) was a U.S. representative from Massachusetts and a colonel in the Union Army during the American Civil War.

William Cogswell may also refer to:

- William Cogswell (New Hampshire physician) (1760–1831), surgeon's mate in the American Revolutionary War, physician, grandfather of the American politician and colonel William Cogswell
- William F. Cogswell (1819–1903), American portrait painter
- William Henry Cogswell (1798–1876), American physician and state senator
- William S. Cogswell Jr. (born 1975), member of the South Carolina House of Representatives
