= VMF-512 =

Marine Fighting Squadron 512
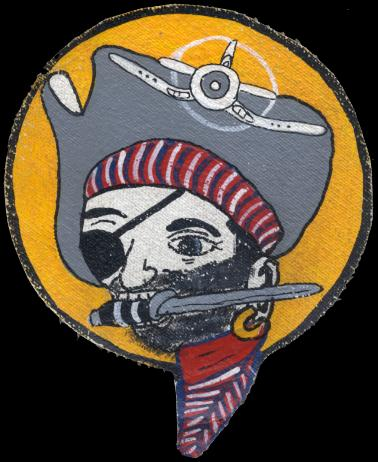
- VMF-512 Insignia
- Active: 15 Feb 1944 – 10 Mar 1946
- Country: United States
- Allegiance: United States of America
- Branch: United States Marine Corps
- Type: Fighter squadron
- Role: Air interdiction close air support
- Part of: Inactive
- Engagements: World War II * Battle of Okinawa * Battle of Balikpapan (1945)

Marine Fighting Squadron 512 (VMF-512) was a fighter squadron of the United States Marine Corps during World War II. The squadron was aircraft carrier based during the last year of the war and supported combat operations during the Battle of Okinawa and the Battle of Balikpapan (1945). Following the end of World War II they were deactivated on 10 March 1946 and remain in an inactive status today.

== History ==
=== World War II ===
VMF-512 was commissioned 15 February 1944 at Marine Corps Auxiliary Air Field Oak Grove, North Carolina. During its first few months the squadron was a part of Project Danny which was a plan for Marine Corps F4U Corsair fighter aircraft to attack German V-1 flying bomb launch sites in northern France. The operation was canceled before departing for the European Theatre of World War II. Shortly thereafter the squadron was transferred along with the rest of Marine Aircraft Group 51 (MAG-51) to Marine Corps Air Station Mojave, California on 5 September 1944.

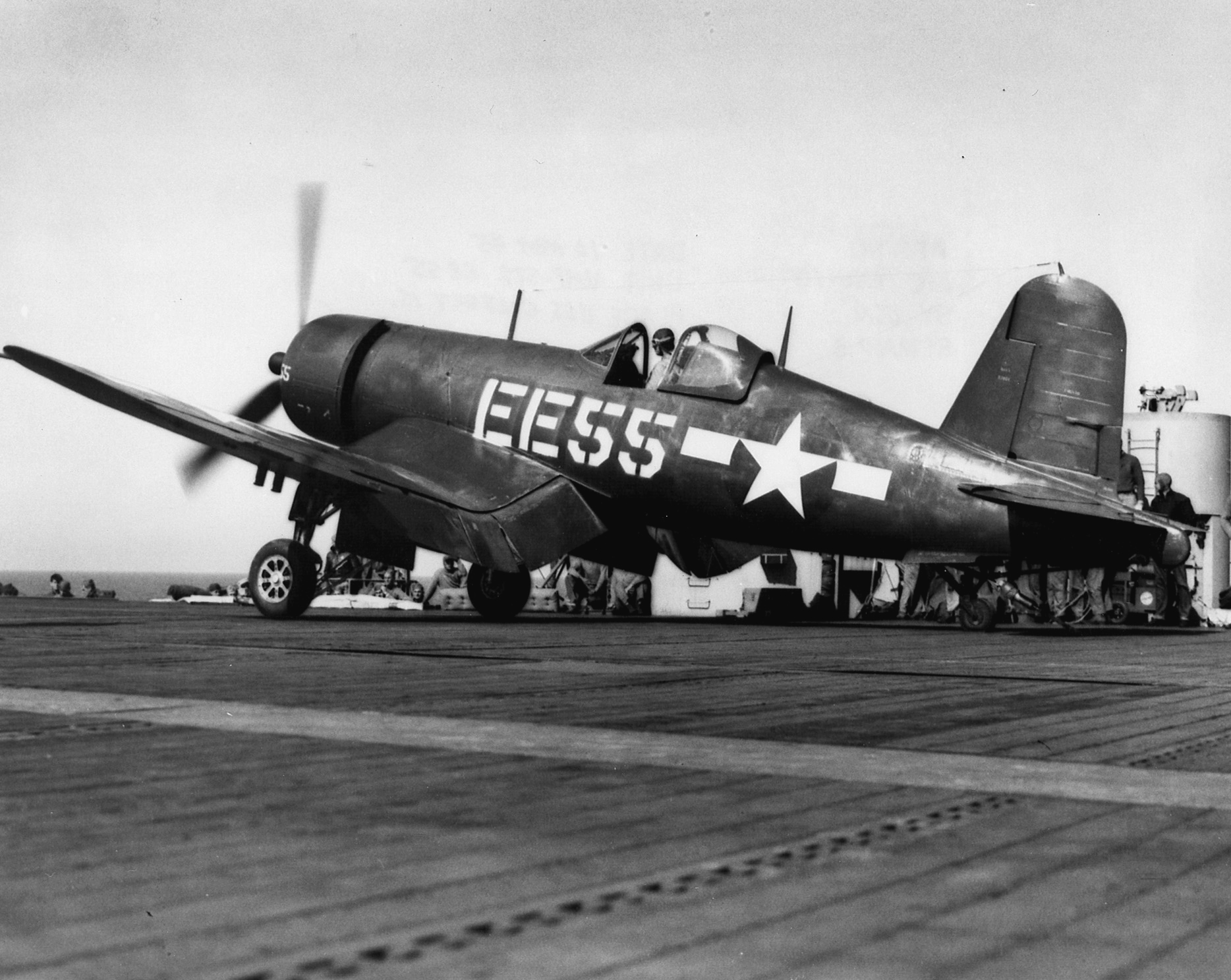
A Vought F4U-1D Corsair of VMF-512 ready to launch from USS Gilbert Islands (CVE-107) during the ship's shakedown cruise, 6 March 1945.

Training quickly resumed at MCAS Mojave and on 5 November 1944 the squadron was re-designated as Marine Fighting Squadron (Carrier Squadron) (VMF(CVS)-512) denoting that the squadron was now Aircraft carrier based. On 8 December 1944, VMF-512 was transferred to Marine Air Support Group 48 (MASG-48) at Marine Corps Air Station Santa Barbara, California where it continued training until it went aboard the USS Gilbert Islands (CVE-107) in March 1945 for a shakedown cruise and carrier-landing practice. For their initial cruise VMF-512 was paired with VMTB-143 to form Marine Carrier Group 2 (MCVG-2). After their training cruise the squadron departed San Diego on 12 April 1945 for exercises in Hawaiian waters.

The USS Gilbert Islands arrived off the coast of Okinawa, Japan on 21 May. During the Battle of Okinawa VMF-512 aircraft blasted and strafed concrete dugouts, troop concentrations, ammunition and fuel dumps on Okinawa from 24 to 31 May. In the following days they helped neutralize outlying Japanese airfields and installations, including the Sakishima Islands with repeated bomb and rocket attacks. Later in June, the USS Gilbert Islands departed for Leyte, in the Philippines. Soon thereafter they sailed to support operations in Borneo.

During the Battle of Balikpapan VMF-512 provided close air support for the Australian 7th Division. The squadron remained carrier based and at the end of World War II was operating at sea near Tokyo. As part of the post-war drawdown of forces, VMF-512 was decommissioned on 10 March 1946.

== See also ==
- United States Marine Corps Aviation
- List of active United States Marine Corps aircraft squadrons
- List of inactive United States Marine Corps aircraft squadrons

== Citations ==
=== Sources ===
- Condon, John P (1998), Corsairs and Flattops – Marine Carrier Air Warfare, 1944-45, Annapolis, Maryland: Naval Institute Press, ISBN 1-55750-127-0
- Crowder, Michael J., United States Marine Corps Aviation Squadron Lineage, Insignia & History – Volume One – The Fighter Squadrons, Turner Publishing Company, ISBN 978-1-56311-926-2
- Rottman, Gordon (2002), U.S. Marine Corps World War II Order of Battle – Ground and Air Units in the Pacific War, 1939 – 1945, Greenwood Press, ISBN 0-313-31906-5
- Sherrod, Robert, History of Marine Corps Aviation in World War II, Combat Forces Press, ISBN 978-0-933852-58-7
