= Cogswell K. Green =

American politician

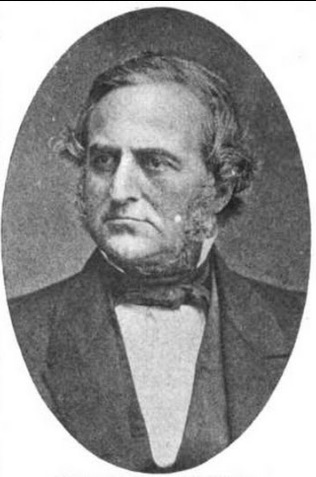

Member of the Michigan House of Representatives from the Berrien County district
- In office November 2, 1835 – January 1, 1837
- Preceded by: Legislature established
- Succeeded by: Robert E. Ward

Personal details
- Born: July 29, 1809 Putney, Vermont
- Died: December 3, 1889 (aged 80) Exeter, New Hampshire

Cogswell Kidder Green (July 29, 1809 – December 3, 1889) was an American lawyer and politician. He served as a member of the Michigan House of Representatives during its first term from 1835 to 1837.

== Biography ==
Cogswell Green was born in Putney, Vermont, on July 29, 1809, to Captain Thomas Kidder Green and Betsey Cogswell. He attended the Chesterfield Academy and another school in Amherst, Massachusetts, then enrolled at Norwich University in 1823 and graduated in 1826. He studied law under John C. Wright in Steubenville, Ohio, beginning in 1828, and was admitted to the bar on August 30, 1830. He was later admitted to the bar of the United States Supreme Court, on January 6, 1846.

He moved to Niles, Michigan in August 1830, and began practicing law there, and was appointed by Lewis Cass as a colonel in the Michigan Territory troops during the Black Hawk War. He served as a probate judge beginning December 27, 1831, until March 20, 1833.

On April 2, 1832, Green was elected township clerk of Niles Township, which at that time encompassed all of Berrien County, and served until 1837. He served as postmaster for Niles from 1835 to 1836, and as president of the village from 1844 to 1845. He was elected as the representative from Berrien County for the first term of the newly created Michigan House of Representatives.

In 1854, Green moved to Washington, D.C., and continued his practice until 1869. After retiring, he moved to Exeter, New Hampshire. He died in Exeter on December 3, 1889.

=== Family ===
Green married Nancy Aurora Howard, daughter of Colonel Joshua Howard, of Dearborn, Michigan, on May 28, 1835. They had three daughters; Katherine, born in 1837, died in childhood in 1841, while the others, Emily, born in 1839, and Nancy, born in 1843, lived to adulthood. Nancy died on February 19, 1843, and Green later remarried, to Sarah Lawrence of Exeter, on November 23, 1854. Sarah lived until about 1880.
