= USS Cogswell =

Fletcher-class destroyer

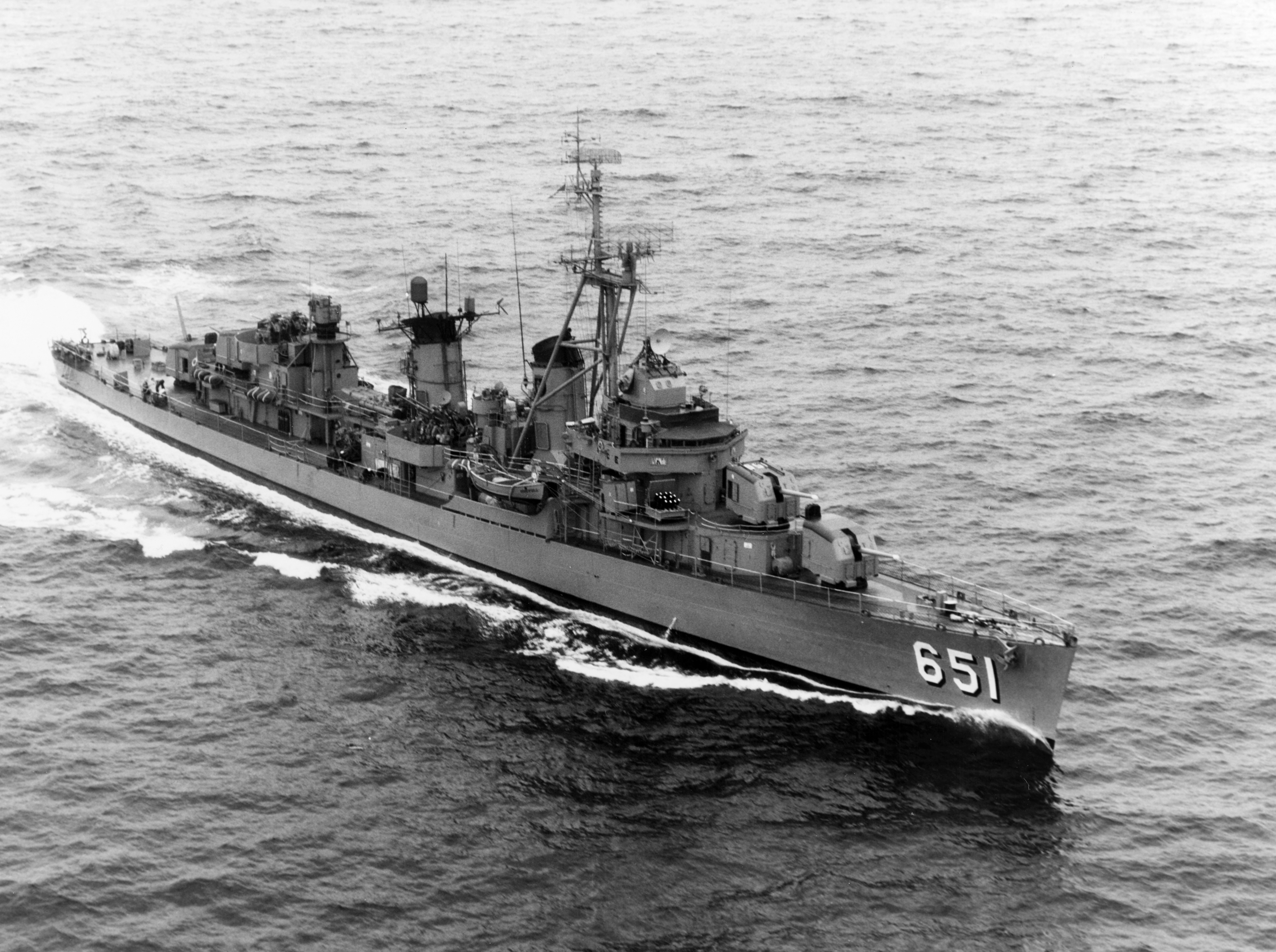
- USS Cogswell in January 1963

History

United States
- Builder: Bath Iron Works, Bath, ME
- Laid down: 1 February 1943
- Launched: 5 June 1943
- Commissioned: 17 August 1943
- Decommissioned: 1 October 1969
- Stricken: 1 October 1969
- Fate: Transferred to the Turkish Navy, 1 October 1969

Turkey
- Name: Izmit
- Acquired: 1 October 1969
- Fate: Scrapped 1981

General characteristics
- Class & type: Fletcher-class destroyer
- Displacement: 2,050 tons
- Length: 376 ft 6 in (114.7 m)
- Beam: 39 ft 8 in (12.1 m)
- Draft: 17 ft 9 in (5.4 m)
- Propulsion: 60,000 shp (45 MW); 2 propellers
- Speed: 35 knots (65 km/h; 40 mph)
- Range: 6500 nm at 15 kn (12,000 km at 28 km/h)
- Complement: 319
- Armament: 5 × 5-inch 38 caliber guns, 4 × 40 mm AA guns, 4 × 20 mm AA guns, 10 × 21 inch (533 mm) torpedo tubes, 6 × depth charge projectors, 2 × depth charge tracks

USS Cogswell (DD-651) was a Fletcher-class destroyer in the United States Navy, serving in World War II, Korean War, and Vietnam War. The ship was named in honor of Rear Admiral James Kelsey Cogswell, who served during the Spanish–American War, and Captain Francis Cogswell, who served during World War I.

== Construction and commissioning ==
Cogswell was launched on 5 June 1943 by Bath Iron Works at Bath, Maine, cosponsored by Mrs. D. C. Bingham, daughter of Rear Admiral Cogswell, and Mrs. Francis Cogswell, widow of Captain Cogswell. Cogswell was commissioned on 17 August 1943.

== Service history ==
=== United States Navy ===
==== World War II ====
Cogswell arrived at Pearl Harbor on 9 December 1943 for training, and there joined the screen of mighty carrier Task Force 58 for the Marshall Islands operation. At sea on this duty from 16 January to 12 February 1944, when she put into Majuro, Cogswell also bombarded Gugewe Island. She continued her screening as the carriers launched raids on Truk on 16–17 February and on bases in the Marianas Islands on 21–22 February, then sailed from Majuro to Espiritu Santo to screen carriers providing air cover for the seizure of Emirau Island from 20 to 25 March, and raiding the Palaus, Yap, and Woleai from 30 March to 1 April.

The destroyer returned to Majuro on 6 April 1944, and a week later joined the sortie for the Hollandia landings of 21–24 April, and air raids on Truk, Satawan, and Ponape at the close of the month. Replenishment at Majuro from 4 May to 6 June preceded Cogswell's assignment to screen carriers during the landings in the Marianas. On 16 June, Cogswell was temporarily detached to join in the bombardment of Guam, rejoining her force to guard it during the momentous air Battle of the Philippine Sea on 19–20 June. She continued her screening in the raids on Palau, Ulithi, Yap, Iwo Jima, and Chichi Jima from 25 July to 5 August, during the last of which she joined in the surface gunfire which sank several ships of a Japanese convoy earlier badly mauled by carrier aircraft. From 11 to 30 August, she replenished at Eniwetok.

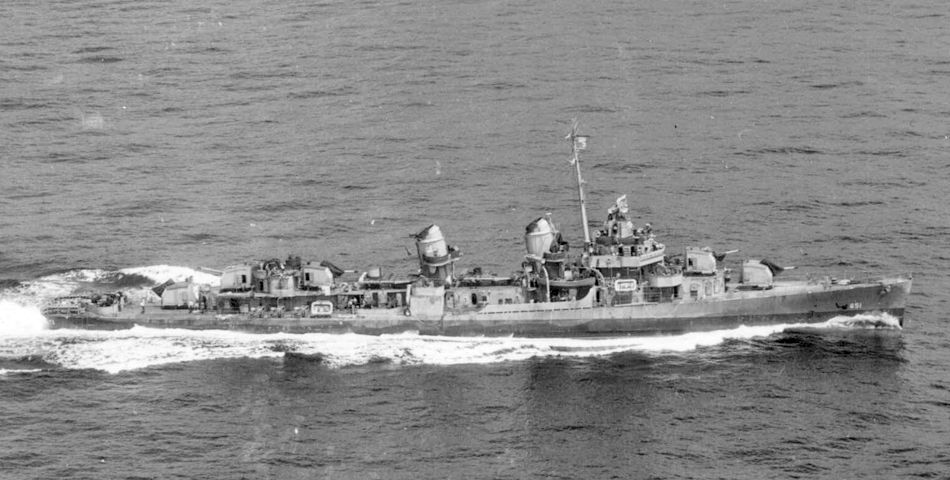
Cogswell in 1945.

Next at sea from 30 August to 27 September 1944, Cogswell sailed in the carrier screen as strikes were hurled at targets in the Palaus and Philippines during the invasion of Peleliu. On 6 October, she sailed from Ulithi for the air strikes on Okinawa and Formosa in preparation for the Leyte landings. On 9 October she depth-charged a submarine that submerged to a depth of 250 feet (76 m) as Cogswell approached and did not respond to Cogswell's sonar recognition signals. Cogswell set her depth charges to explode at 150 feet (46 m) and halted her attack after the submarine responded to the recognition signals. The submarine, USS Flying Fish (SS-229), suffered no damage nor any casualties. Cogswell fired protective antiaircraft cover for her force during the Formosa air battle of 12–14 October. After guarding the retirement toward safety of the heavy cruiser Canberra and light cruiser Houston, she rejoined her force for air strikes on Luzon and the Visayans, and screened them during the Battle of Surigao Strait, one phase of the decisive Battle of Leyte Gulf. She returned to Ulithi on 30 October, where future astronaut Alan Shepard joined the ship as a gunnery officer, but was put to sea 2 days later to return to the Philippines. After the light cruiser Reno was damaged by a submarine's torpedo, Cogswell guarded her passage to the safety of Ulithi, then returned to screen air strikes on Luzon, the landings on Mindoro, and the air attacks on Formosa and the China coast which neutralized Japanese bases in preparation for and during the Lingayen Gulf invasion. Cogswell screened the aircraft carrier Ticonderoga, hit during an air attack, into Ulithi 24 January 1945, then steamed on to the United States West Coast for overhaul.

After completing overhaul and steaming across the Pacific guarding convoys, Cogswell arrived off Okinawa on 27 May 1945 for dangerous and demanding duty as radar picket until 26 June. Three days later she rejoined the carrier Task Force 38 for the final series of raids against the Japanese home islands until the close of the war. Arriving in Sagami Wan on 27 August, Cogswell pushed on into Tokyo Bay on 2 September for the surrender ceremonies. Cogswell was given the honor of being the first USN ship to enter Tokyo Bay before the surrender. She supported the occupation in the Far East through operations in Japanese waters and escort duty to Korean ports until 5 December, when she sailed from Yokosuka for San Diego, Boston, and Charleston, South Carolina, where she was decommissioned and placed in reserve 30 April 1946.

==== Post-World War II ====
Recommissioned on 7 January 1951, Cogswell served with the Atlantic Fleet with Newport, Rhode Island, as her home port. Between 26 August 1952 and February 1953, she cruised to ports of northern Europe while taking part in NATO operations, sailing on for duty with the 6th Fleet in the Mediterranean. She again cleared Newport on 10 August 1953, bound for the Panama Canal and duty off Korea and patrolling in the Taiwan Straits. Continuing westward, she sailed through the Suez Canal, and completed her cruise around the world on 10 March 1954.

On 15 December 1954, Cogswell arrived in San Diego to join the Pacific Fleet. From that time through 1963, she has alternated tours of duty with the 7th Fleet in the Far East with coastwise operations. On her 1955 cruise, she took part in the evacuation of the Tachen Islands. She returned to the Far East in 1956 and each succeeding year through 1960. In 1957, Cogswell visited Australia and the Fiji Islands, and in 1958, she took part in nuclear weapons tests at Johnston Island, and patrolled in the Taiwan Straits when Chinese Communists resumed shelling of the offshore islands and threatened their assault.

=== Turkish Navy ===
Cogswell made four deployments to Southeast Asia during the war in Vietnam. Following her last deployment, Cogswell was decommissioned on 1 October 1969. Cogswell then was given to the Turkish Navy, where she served as TCG Ismit (D 342) until 1981. She was scrapped after her service in the Turkish Navy.

== Honors and awards ==
Cogswell received nine battle stars for World War II service.
