= Robert Claude Maze =

American military officer

Robert Claude Maze Sr.
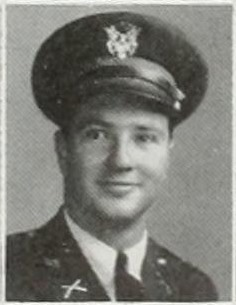
- Born: 25 May 1918; San Francisco, California, US
- Died: 27 May 1945 (aged 27); Okinawa, Japan
- Burial place: At sea
- Alma mater: University of California, Los Angeles
- Spouse: Rosemarie Price
- Children: Robert Maze Jr.
- Relatives: Earl Winfield Spencer Jr. (stepfather), Arthur W. Radford (stepfather)
- Military career
- Allegiance: United States
- Branch: U.S. Marine Corps Aviation
- Service years: 1940—1945
- Rank: Major
- Nickname: "Bob"
- Unit: USS Block Island (CVE-106)
- Commands: VMF-511
- Conflicts: World War II: Pacific War; Battle of Okinawa
- Awards: Distinguished Flying Cross; Purple Heart; World War II Victory Medal

Robert Claude Maze (25 May 1918 – 27 May 1945) was an American military officer and aviator. He was killed in action during the Battle of Okinawa and was posthumously awarded the Distinguished Flying Cross.

== Biography ==
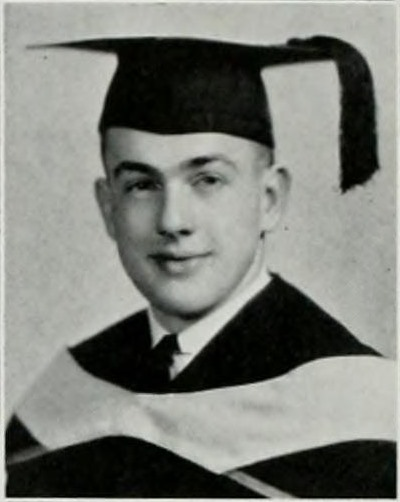
Maze as a graduate

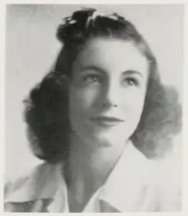
Rosemarie Price

Robert Claude Maze was born on 25 May 1918, in San Francisco, California. His parents were Albert Cressey Maze (1891–1943) and Miriam Jeannette Ham (1895–1997). Miriam married twice after her divorce from Albert Maze: first to Earl Winfield Spencer Jr., a pioneering United States Naval Aviator and the first husband of Wallis Simpson, and then to Arthur W. Radford, another U.S. Naval Aviator and the future Chairman of the Joint Chiefs of Staff.

In 1936, Maze enrolled at the University of California, Los Angeles. He was a member of the rowing team, participated in university diving competitions, and was a member of the Sigma Nu fraternity. He was also a member of Scabbard and Blade and the Pershing Rifles and a cadet in the Reserve Officers' Training Corps. He graduated in 1940 with a Bachelor of Arts degree in Economics. He lived in Oakland, California.

On 19 June 1940, he was promoted to the rank of second lieutenant in the U.S. Marine Corps. Among his comrades, he was known simply as "Bob". He later received the rank of major. In 1943, Robert Maze married Rosemarie Price at Naval Air Station Jacksonville in Florida. Originally from Honolulu, Hawaii, she graduated from Punahou School in 1941 and later attended Stanford University, where she became a member of the Delta Gamma sorority.

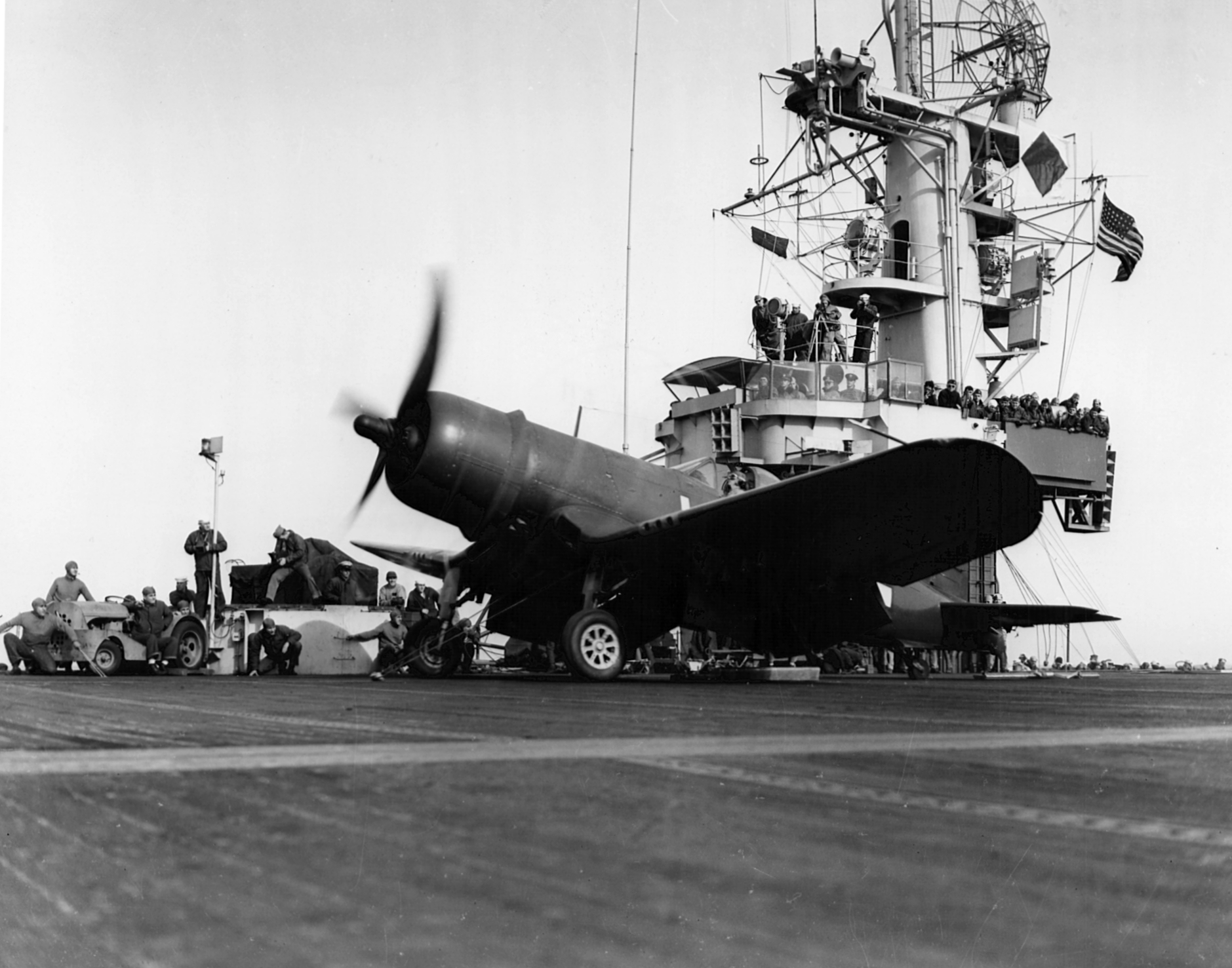
F4U Corsair aboard USS Block Island, Okinawa, 1945

On 10 January 1944, Maze became commander of Marine Fighting Squadron 511 (VMF-511), based at Marine Corps Outlying Field Oak Grove, North Carolina and established on 1 January of that year. After training at Simmons-Nott Airport, North Carolina, Boca Chica, Florida, Naval Air Station Quonset Point, Rhode Island, and Naval Auxiliary Air Station Manteo, North Carolina, the squadron, equipped with F4U Corsair fighters, was transferred to Mojave, California, in September 1944. Assigned to the Pacific Ocean, the squadron departed for Pearl Harbor, Hawaii, on 20 March 1945, aboard USS Block Island (CVE-106). The ship was then sent to the shores of Japan, where in May and June 1945 the squadron made a number of sorties in support of military operations on Okinawa. At that time, the squadron consisted of eight F4U Corsairs and ten F6F Hellcats.

On 27 May 1945, Major Maze, together with a wingman, attacked several small Japanese ships off Ishigaki Island. Maze's plane was struck by anti-aircraft fire, while his wingman was able to break away. The burning plane crashed into shallow water in the East China Sea, killing Maze. He was 27 years old. Captain James L. Secrest assumed command of the squadron the same day and remained in that post until the end of the war. Neither Maze's body nor the wreckage of the plane was recovered. However, his name was inscribed on the Honolulu Memorial.

For his actions in the Pacific War, Maze was posthumously awarded the Distinguished Flying Cross, the Purple Heart and the World War II Victory Medal. Secrest was also awarded the Distinguished Flying Cross. The Distinguished Flying Cross was presented to Maze's widow, Rosemarie. They had a son, Robert Maze Jr., who was less than a year old at the time of his father's death.

== Awards and decorations ==

Distinguished Flying Cross	Purple Heart	World War II Victory Medal

=== Distinguished Flying Cross citation ===
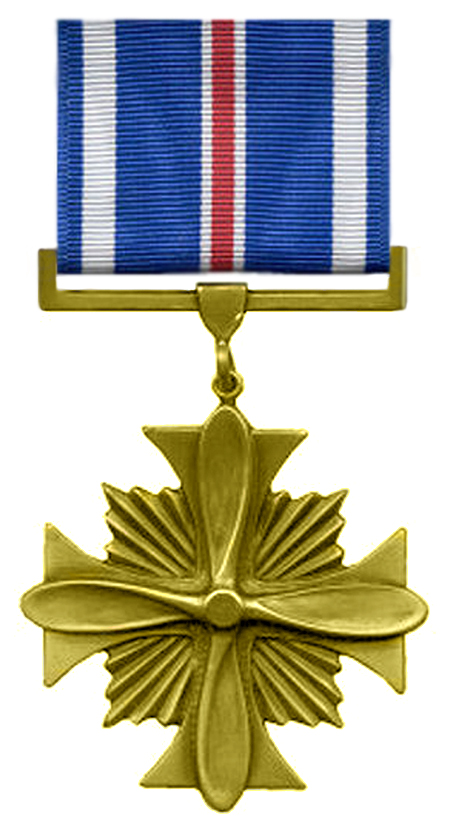

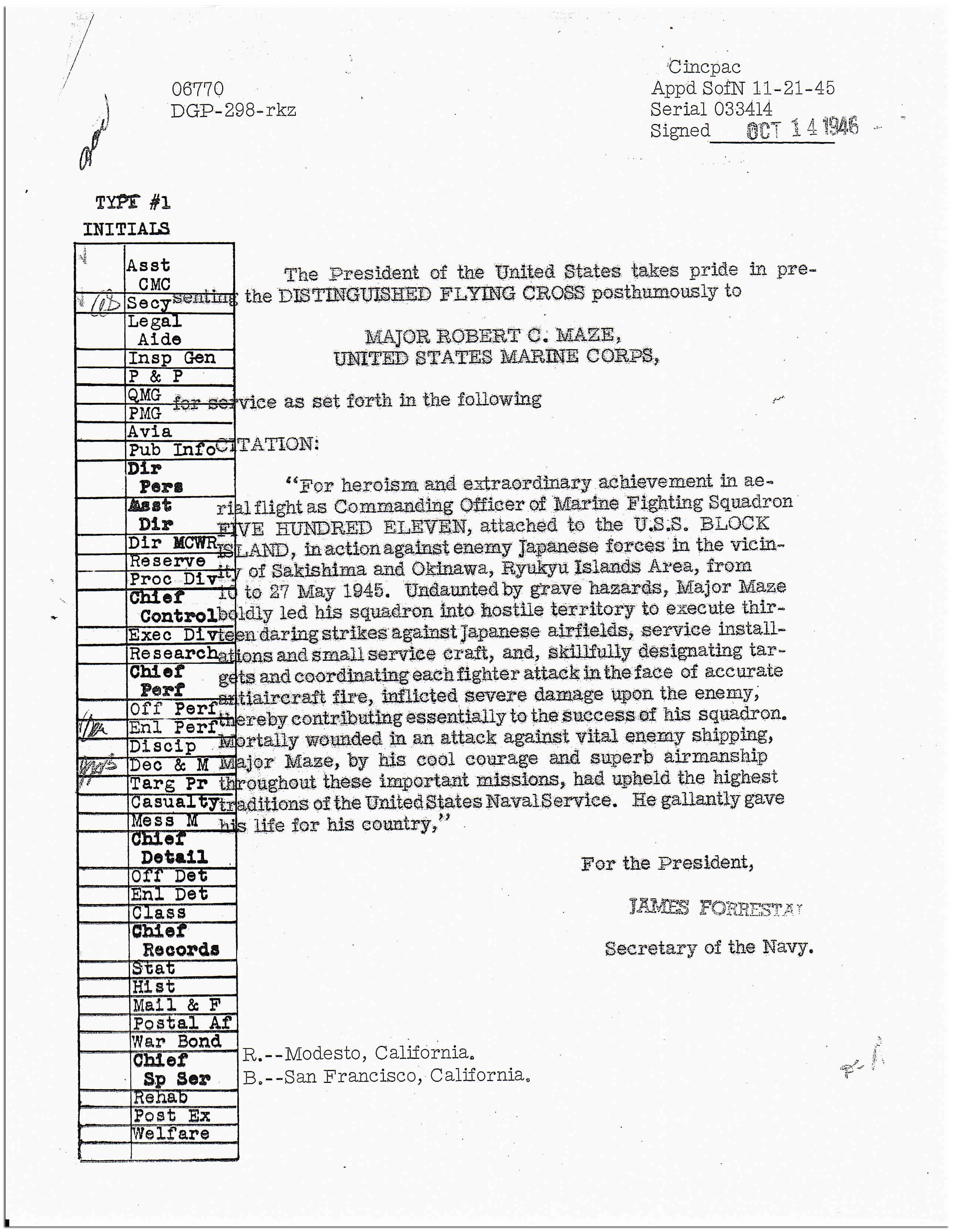

The President of the United States takes pride in presenting the DISTINGUISHED FLYING CROSS posthumously to

MAJOR ROBERT C. MAZE,
UNITED STATES MARINE CORPS,

for service as set forth in the following CITATION:

For heroism and extraordinary achievement in aerial flight as Commanding Officer of Marine Fighting Squadron FIVE HUNDRED ELEVEN, attached to the U.S.S. BLOCK ISLAND, in action against enemy Japanese forces in the vicinity of Sakashima and Okinawa, Ryukyu Islands Area, from 10 to 27 May 1945. Undaunted by grave hazards, Major Maze boldly led his squadron into hostile territory to execute thirteen daring strikes against Japanese airfields, service installations and small service craft, and, skillfully designating targets and coordinating each fighter attack in the face of accurate antiaircraft fire, inflicted severe damage upon the enemy, thereby contributing essentially to the success of his squadron. Mortally wounded in an attack against vital enemy shipping, Major Maze, by his cool courage and superb airmanship throughout these important missions, had upheld the highest traditions of the United States Naval Service. He gallantly gave his life for his country.
