= 233 Squadron =

233 Squadron or 233rd Squadron may refer to:

- No. 233 Squadron RAF, a unit of the United Kingdom Royal Air Force
- VMA-233, a unit of the United States Marine Corps
