= VMF-511 =

Marine Fighting Squadron 511
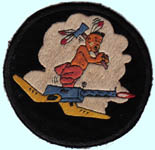
- VMF-511's WWII insignia
- Active: 1 Jan 1944 – 11 Mar 1946; 15 Apr 1958 – 31 Aug 1972
- Country: United States
- Branch: USMC
- Type: Fighter squadron
- Role: Air interdiction Close air support
- Part of: Decommissioned
- Engagements: World War II: Battle of Okinawa; Battle of Balikpapan (1945)

Aircraft flown
- Fighter: F4U-1D Corsair; F6F-5N/5P Hellcats; F-8 Crusader

Marine Fighting Squadron 511 (VMF-511) was a fighter squadron of the Marine Corps and Marine Forces Reserve during World War II and the Cold War which flew aircraft types such as the F6F Hellcat, F4U Corsair, and the F-8 Crusader. They were originally activated during World War II and fought during the Battle of Okinawa and the Battle of Balikpapan (1945). They specialized in close air support and during the course of the war were credited with only one plane shot down.

Following the surrender of Japan, the squadron was deactivated on 11 March 1946. They were reactivated in the Marine Forces Reserve and were based out of Naval Air Station Willow Grove, Pennsylvania. The squadron's tailcode was originally 7W, then in 1970 it became 5W, and then in 1972 it changed to MK.

== History ==
=== World War II ===
Marine Fighting Squadron 511 (VMF-511) was commissioned on 1 January 1944, at Marine Corps Auxiliary Air Field Oak Grove, North Carolina. The squadron was a part of Marine Aircraft Group 51 (MAG-51) and its original mission was to take part in Operation Crossbow (Project Danny), an ill-conceived plan to have Marine squadrons aboard escort carriers hunt down V-1 flying bomb launch sites in eastern France. After that operation was canceled, the new mission for MAG-51 and VMF-511 was to train for deployment aboard Navy carriers in the Pacific. The squadron moved to Marine Corps Air Station Mojave, California, on 10 September 1944, and began carrier qualification training. It was equipped with a mixed bag of eight F6F-5N Hellcat night fighters, two F6F-5P photo reconnaissance Hellcats and eight F4U-1D Corsairs. This mix of aircraft gave the squadron both a night fighting capability and photo reconnaissance capability on top of its ability to provide close air support. On 28 October 1944, the squadron was re-designated VMF(CVS)-511 to reflect its special training and participation in the escort carrier program. Upon completion of this training it was assigned to Marine Carrier Air Group 1 (MCVG-1) where it was partnered with VMTB-233 on USS Block Island (CVE-106). The squadron left the West Coast on 20 March 1945.

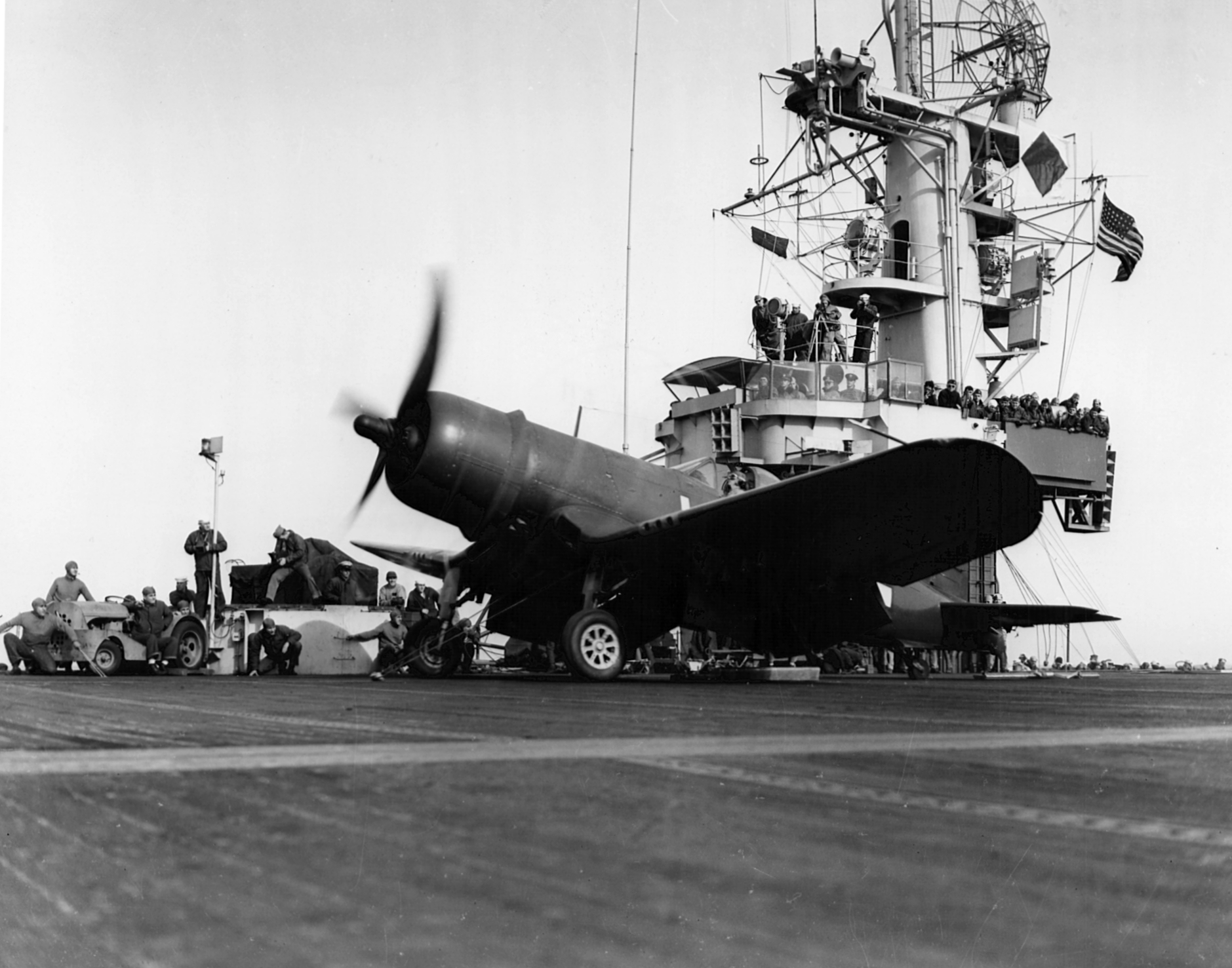
An F4U-1D of VMF-511 aboard USS Block Island (CVE-106), 1945.

On 10 May 1945, the squadron saw its first combat during the Battle of Okinawa when it attacked Japanese mortar positions. For the next month it provided close air support for Marines and soldiers on the ground during the battle. The squadron was also a part of the effort to reduce Shuri Castle and interdict small water craft. During this time the squadron lost its commanding officer, Major Robert Maze, when his F4U Corsair was hit by flak from Ishigaki Island and crashed into the East China Sea. In mid-June, the USS Block Island was relieved from duty off the coast of Okinawa and ordered to Leyte in the Philippines. From there, it supported the early stages of the Australian 7th Division's invasion of Balikpapan. 511 returned to Leyte on 4 July 1945, and did not see combat for the rest of the war. Still aboard the USS Block Island when WWII ended, VMF(CVS)-511's final missions were flown in support of the Japanese surrender of Formosa.

Following the surrender of Japan, the squadron returned to Marine Corps Air Station Santa Barbara, California and was eventually decommissioned at Marine Corps Air Station El Toro, California on 10 March 1946.

=== Reserve Years ===
On 15 April 1958, the Marine Corps reactivated the squadron as the Marine Air Reserve Training Detachment Willow Grove at Naval Air Station Willow Grove, Pennsylvania. At first, the squadron shared its F-8 Crusader aircraft with Naval Air Reserve squadrons VF-931 and VF-932. In 1970, the reserves were reorganized and VMF-511 became an independent squadron with its own aircraft. The squadron was finally deactivated on 31 August 1972, as part of the post-Vietnam draw down of forces.

== Notable former members ==
- Edward J. Wallof, recipient of the Navy Cross

== Unit awards ==
A unit citation or commendation is an award bestowed upon an organization for the action cited. Members of the unit who participated in said actions are allowed to wear the awarded unit citations on their uniforms. VMF-511 was presented with the following awards:

Ribbon	Unit Award
	Asiatic-Pacific Campaign Medal
	World War II Victory Medal
	National Defense Service Medal with one Bronze Star

== See also ==
- United States Marine Corps Aviation
- List of active United States Marine Corps aircraft squadrons
- List of decommissioned United States Marine Corps aircraft squadrons
