= Matthias B. Gardner =

United States Navy Vice admiral

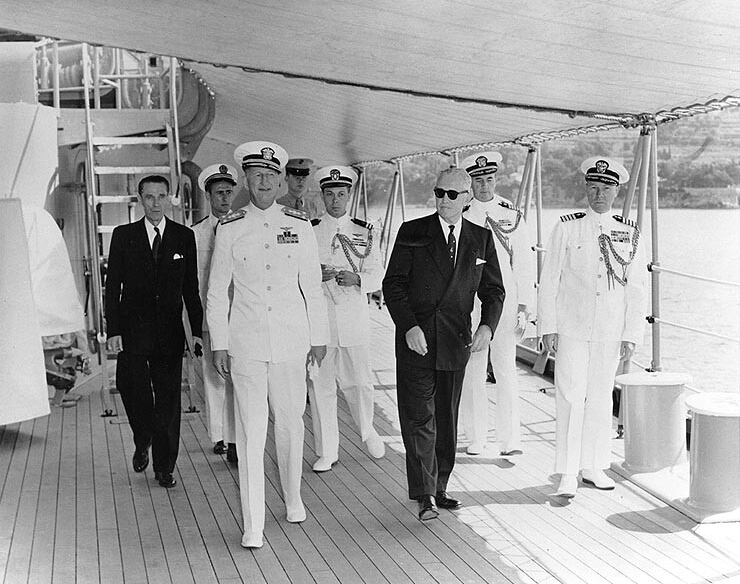
- Vice Admiral Matthias B. Gardner, (left center) c. 1951-1952
- Born: 28 November 1897; Washington, D.C., US
- Died: 23 August 1975 (aged 77); Pensacola, Florida, US
- Burial place: Barrancas National Cemetery, Pensacola, Florida
- Military career
- Allegiance: United States
- Branch: United States Navy
- Service years: 1918–1956
- Rank: Vice Admiral
- Commands: US Pacific Fleet: Carrier Division Eleven; Naval Station Pearl Harbor; Carrier Division Seven; US Second Fleet; US Sixth Fleet
- Conflicts: World War II, Gilbert and Marshall Islands campaign
- Awards: Distinguished Service Medal; Legion of Merit (2); Bronze Star Medal; Navy Unit Commendation

Matthias Bennett Gardner (28 November 1897 – 23 August 1975) was an American naval officer, rear admiral and later, vice admiral of the United States Navy. He served during the World War II at various posts and units, including assistant commander-in-chief at Pacific Fleet for Plans, and was then assigned to command the Carrier Division Eleven for USS Enterprise CV-6, USS Saratoga CV-3 and USS Ranger CV-4 respectively. He retired as Deputy Chief of Naval Operations in 1956.

In 1922, he was appointed for assigning his duty as a flight trainee at Naval Air Station Pensacola. Soon after completing his graduation, Gardner went to France with the destroyer force for convoy duty stationed at Brest, France. Before the WW2 broke out, he spent several years in various aviation assignments in navy department.

== Biography ==
Raised in State College, Pennsylvania, Gardner was appointed to the United States Naval Academy in 1915. In 1918, he graduated from the Academy and was commissioned as an ensign. The US took part in Gilbert and Marshall Islands campaign under his command. Between 1945 and 1948, he was appointed to two subsequent posts, and served as commanding officer of Naval Station Pearl Harbor and office of the Chief of Naval Operations in Washington. Later, in 1950, admiral Gardner was also appointed promoted to the commander for Carrier Division Seven. He also served commander of Second Fleet from September 1950 to 1951 as the vice admiral and Sixth Fleet from 1951 to 1952 in Mediterranean. He was also serving as the member of National Advisory Committee for Aeronautics (NACA) from 1952 to 1953. In 1956, he was promoted to four-star admiral and retired from the naval department as Deputy Chief of Naval Operations.

== Awards ==
The President of United States of that time, conferred numerous military decorations upon Gardner in recognition of his contributions. He received one Distinguished Service Medal, two Legion of Merits, one Bronze Star Medal, and a navy unit award Navy Unit Commendation.

== Death ==
On 23 August 1975, Gardner died at the Naval Medical Institute in Pensacola. His funeral was held on 27 August at U.S. navy base Naval Air Station Pensacola.
