= Carrier Division Eleven =

Division of the United States Navy

Carrier Division Eleven was a seagoing division (2-4 large ships) of the United States Navy. It was established in August 1944 at Pearl Harbor to focus on night carrier operations. Rear Admiral Matthias B. Gardner was appointed to command the division, which consisted of USS Saratoga (CV-3) and USS Ranger (CV-4).

On 21 July 1943, Admiral Arthur W. Radford was given command of Carrier Division Eleven, which consisted of the new Essex-class carrier USS Lexington as well as the light carriers USS Independence and USS Princeton. These carriers remained at Pearl Harbor through August, training and refining their operations. Radford got his first operational experience on 1 September 1943, covering a foray to Baker and Howland Islands as part of Task Force 11 under Rear Admiral Willis A. Lee. Radford commanded Princeton, USS Belleau Wood and four destroyers to act as a covering force for Lee's Marines, who built an airfield on the islands. After this successful operation, and at the direction of Admiral Chester W. Nimitz, Task Force 11 was joined by Task Force 15, with Lexington, under Rear Admiral Charles A. Pownall. The two task forces then steamed for Tarawa Atoll to strike it. On the night of 17 September, the carriers launched six strikes of fighter aircraft, dive bombers, and torpedo planes to work over the Japanese defenses.

Next, Radford and his carriers took part in an air attack and cruiser bombardment of Wake Island on 5 to 6 October 1943. He shifted his flag to Lexington for the operation, which took two days. Though the effects on Japanese positions were not known, Radford and other leaders considered the operations useful for readying troops for the many major battles to come in the Central Pacific.

The Saratoga departed San Francisco two days later and arrived in Pearl Harbor on 24 September 1944. The ship was assigned to Carrier Division 11 which was tasked to train night fighter pilots and to develop night tactics and doctrine. Rear Admiral Matthias Gardner made Saratoga his flagship on 10 October. Four days later, the ship was accidentally rammed by her plane guard destroyer Clark, gashing the port side of her hull. Operations were immediately cancelled and she returned to port for temporary repairs. Permanent repairs were made during a brief refit during the first week of November. Carrier qualification and other training continued through most of January 1945.

== Sources ==
- Fry, John (1996). USS Saratoga CV-3: An Illustrated History of the Legendary Aircraft Carrier 1927–1946. Atglen, Pennsylvania: Schiffer Publishing. ISBN 0-7643-0089-X.
- Muir, Malcolm Jr. (2001). The Human Tradition in the World War II Era. Lanham, Maryland: SR Books. ISBN 978-0-8420-2786-1.
- Polmar, Norman (2008). Aircraft Carriers: A History of Carrier Aviation and Its Influence on World Events, Volume II: 1946-2006. p. 449. ISBN 978-1574886658.
