= Earl Winfield Spencer Jr. =

United States naval officer (1888–1950)

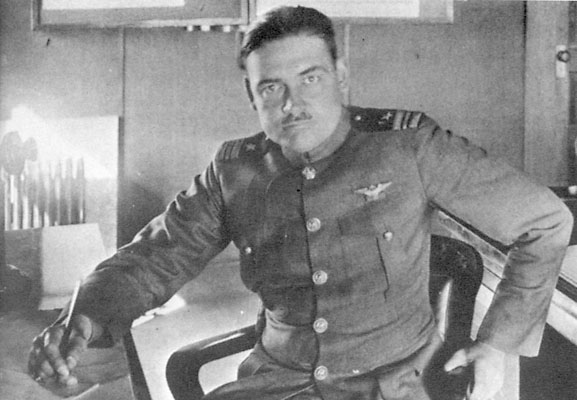
- Born: September 20, 1888; Kinsley, Kansas, U.S.
- Died: May 29, 1950 (aged 61); Coronado, California, U.S.
- Burial place: Fort Rosecrans National Cemetery
- Spouses: Bessie Wallis Warfield (m. 1916; div. 1927) Mariam J. Maze (m. 1928; div. 1936) Norma Reese Johnson (m. 1937; div. 1941) Lillian Phillips (after 1941)
- Military career
- Allegiance: United States
- Branch: United States Navy
- Service years: 1910–1939
- Rank: Commander
- Nickname: Win
- Commands: Naval Air Station San Diego

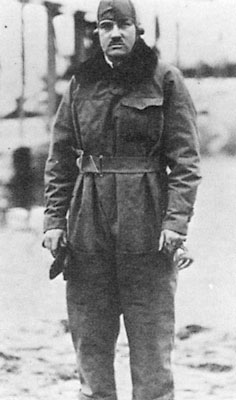
Earl Winfield Spencer Jr. (1920)

Earl Winfield Spencer Jr. (September 20, 1888 – May 29, 1950) was a U.S. Navy pilot who served as the first commanding officer of Naval Air Station San Diego. He was the first husband of Wallis Simpson, who later married Edward VIII.

== Early life and military career ==
Earl Winfield Spencer Jr. was born on September 20, 1888, in Kinsley, Kansas, son of Earl Winfield Spencer Sr., a socially prominent Chicago stockbroker, and Agnes Lucy Hughes. He graduated from the United States Naval Academy in 1910 and in 1917 was sent to San Diego with instructions to set up a permanent naval air station, which was to be used for training exercises. He became its first commanding officer.

== Personal life ==
Spencer was married four times. His wives were:

- Bessie Wallis Warfield (1896–1986): married in Baltimore on November 8, 1916. Spencer was allegedly abusive to her and was an alcoholic. After several separations, they divorced in December 1927.
- Mariam J. Maze (1895–1997): previously married to Albert Cressey Maze (1891–1943). She was the former Miriam Ham, daughter of George and Katie Anastasia (née Eagels) Ham of Portland, Oregon. They married in September 1928 and were divorced in 1936, the same year Spencer was made a Knight of the Order of the Crown of Italy by Benito Mussolini. By this marriage he had one stepson, Robert Claude Maze Sr., Major, USMC (killed in action, 1945). Mariam Spencer married, in 1939, as her third husband, Arthur William Radford, vice admiral, USN, future chairman of the Joint Chiefs of Staff.
- Norma Reese Johnson (1891–1944): widow of a Detroit manufacturer who died in 1928. Spencer and Johnson were married in Los Angeles on July 4, 1937. They married in a double wedding with another couple in February 1937 in Tijuana, Mexico. The couple separated on February 9, 1940, and divorced later that year in Santa Monica, California. Both parties alleged cruelty; The New York Times said that Spencer's "habitual intemperance" caused the divorce. Spencer replied in Time that Johnson "drank as much ... as I did".
- Lillian Phillips (1892–1981): married October 2, 1941.

== Death ==
Spencer died on May 29, 1950, in San Diego, California, at the age of 61.

== In art, screen portrayals, and literature ==
He was portrayed by actor Ryan Hayward in W.E., the 2011 British romantic drama film about the love of Wallis and King Edward VIII co-written and directed by Madonna.
