= VMA-233 =

Marine Attack Squadron 233
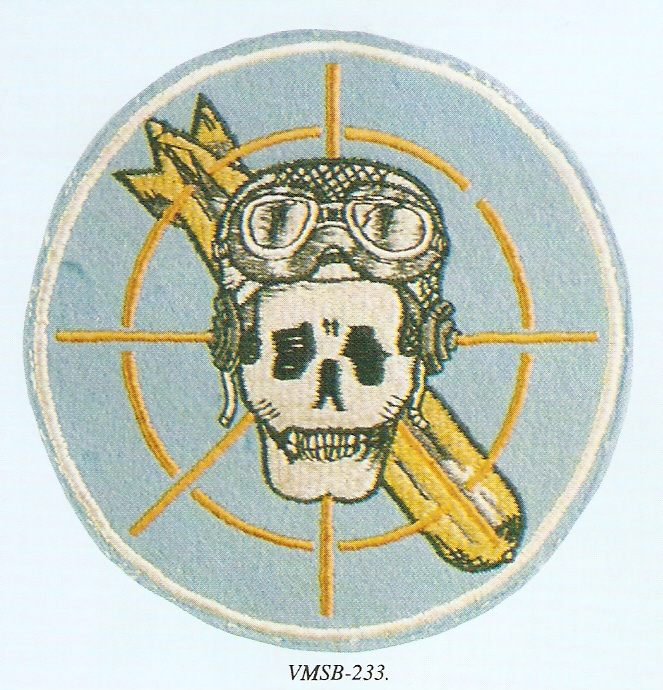
- VMSB-233's WWII insignia
- Active: 1 May 1942 – 10 Mar 1946; August 1946 - 1969
- Country: United States
- Branch: USMC
- Type: Attack Squadron
- Role: Close air support Air interdiction
- Part of: Decommissioned
- Nicknames: Flying Deadheads; Bulldogs (WWII); Rainbow (WWII)
- Tail Code: 6S
- Engagements: World War II * Battle of Guadalcanal * Battle of Okinawa * Battle of Balikpapan (1945)

Aircraft flown
- Attack: AD-5 Skyraider; A4D Skyhawk
- Bomber: SBD Dauntless; TBM-3E Avenger
- Fighter: F4U Corsair; FH1 Phantom; F9F Cougar; F2H Banshee
- Trainer: T2V SeaStar

Marine Attack Squadron 233 (VMA-233) was an A-4 Skyhawk attack squadron in the United States Marine Corps. The squadron, also known as the "Flying Deadheads", were part of the Marine Forces Reserve and were based at Naval Air Station Norfolk, Virginia until their decommissioning in 1969. Originally activated during World War II, they fought in many areas of the Pacific War including the Battle of Guadalcanal as part of the Cactus Air Force, the Battle of Okinawa and the Battle of Balikpapan (1945). They were the only Marine Corps squadron to have three commanding officers killed during the course of the war and were credited with downing 8 Japanese aircraft. Following the surrender of Japan, the squadron was decommissioned on 10 March 1946. They were reactivated as part of the Reserves but were again decommissioned in 1969.

== History ==
The squadron was originally formed on 1 May 1942, at Marine Corps Air Station Ewa, Hawaii as Marine Scout Bombing Squadron 233 (VMSB-233) flying the SBD-4 Dauntless. They deployed overseas in December 1942 on board the seaplane tender USS Wright and first debarked at Espiritu Santo. From 25 December 1942, until 8 February 1943, they operated from Henderson Field on Guadalcanal as part of the Cactus Air Force.

They were reorganized as Marine Torpedo Bombing Squadron 233 (VMTB-233) on 22 May 1943, but the official re-designation of the squadron did not take place until 13 June, when they had returned to the United States. From August until 29 October 1943, the squadron again operated from Henderson Field. Following the Battle of New Georgia the squadron was moved to Munda in New Georgia to conduct raids that would help cut off the Japanese garrison at Rabaul. While in the New Georgia area, they also operated from Piva Airfield and Torokina Airfield.

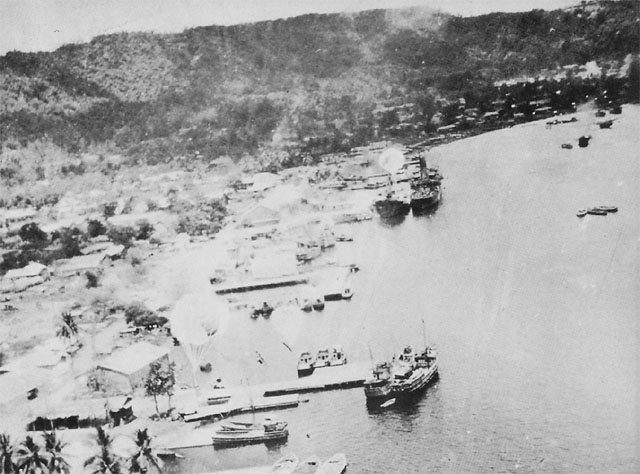
Photo of Simpson Harbor being attacked by other allied air units in November 1943

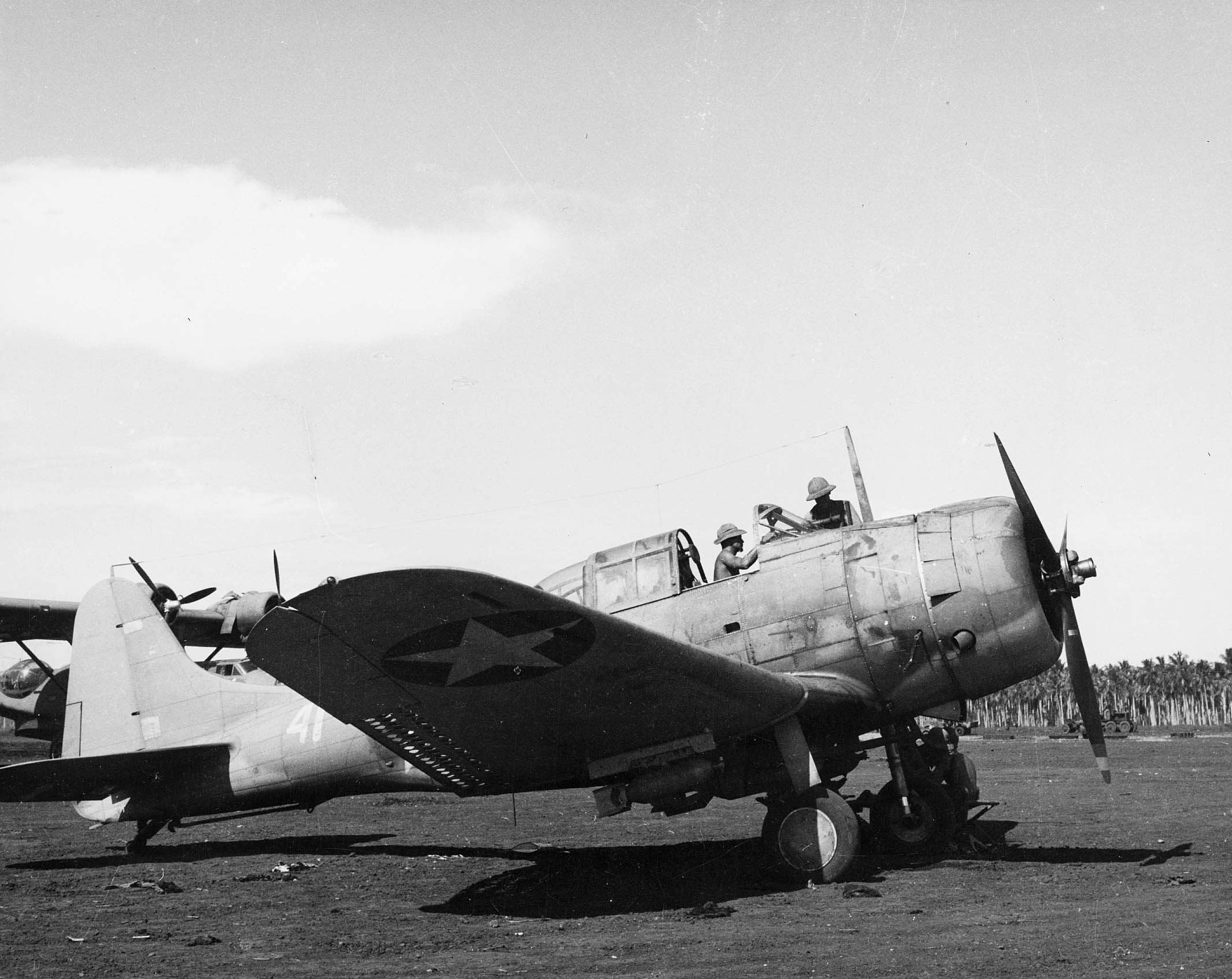
A VMSB-233 SBD-4 at Guadalcanal, 1943.

On 14 February 1944, Avengers from VMTB-233 and VMTB-232 took part in a mission to sow mines in Simpson Harbor at Rabaul. The TBMs were to fly up in three groups of eight each at the slow speed of 160 knots to drop their parachute-mines, weighing 1,600 pounds a piece. The first group lost one plane. The commanding officer tried to radio the other TBFs to warn them to turn back but he couldn't make radio contact. The second group lost two planes. The third group was immediately found by searchlight and anti-aircraft guns while flying at 800 feet over the water and had five aircraft shot down. A total of six planes and eighteen men were lost during the attack. Four of the eighteen men survived the loss of the six TBFs that evening. Of the four, none survived captivity. One was murdered at Tunnel Hill, two died of starvation / disease / medical neglect, and a fourth was murdered by the Japanese Navy sometime in April.

In April 1944, they returned to the United States and were stationed at Marine Corps Air Station Santa Barbara, California. During their time at MCAS Santa Barbara they trained as part of the Marine Corps' new escort carrier program. They were assigned to Marine Carrier Air Group 1 (MCVG-1) where they were partnered with VMF-511 on the USS Block Island. The squadron left the West Coast on 20 March 1945. During this time the squadron's commanding officer, Major Robert Vaupell, was killed in a crash in February 1945.

VMTB-233 saw its first action during the Battle of Okinawa on 5 May 1945, when it conducted rocket and bomb runs against Japanese strongpoints in the vicinity of Naha. Their mission alternated between close air support for the Marines fighting on the ground and strikes against Sakashima Gunto, a kamikaze base complex some 175 miles southwest of Okinawa on Miyako Island.

In mid-June, the Block Island was relieved from the coast of Okinawa and ordered to Leyte in the Philippines. From here they supported the early stages of the Australian 7th Division invasion of Balikpapan in July 1945. They returned to Leyte on 4 July and would not see combat for the rest of the war. Still aboard the Block Island when WWII ended, VMTB-233's final missions were flown in support of the Japanese surrender of Formosa. A USMC ace of VMA-233 was Lt William Hood who was lost while flying over Lake Michigan 4 August 1946.

Following World War II, the squadron returned to the United States, was briefly assigned to Marine Aircraft Group 46 (MAG-46) and was finally decommissioned on 1 March 1946, as part of the post war draw-down of forces.

=== Reserve years ===
The squadron was quickly reactivated later in 1946 as part of the Marine Air Reserves flying out of Naval Air Station Norfolk, Virginia. In October 1951 the unit was called to active duty for the Korean War, but it did not see action during the conflict. They were officially decommissioned in 1969.

== See also ==
- United States Marine Corps Aviation
- List of active United States Marine Corps aircraft squadrons
- List of decommissioned United States Marine Corps aircraft squadrons
