= USS Block Island (CVE-106) =

Commencement Bay-class escort carrier of the US Navy

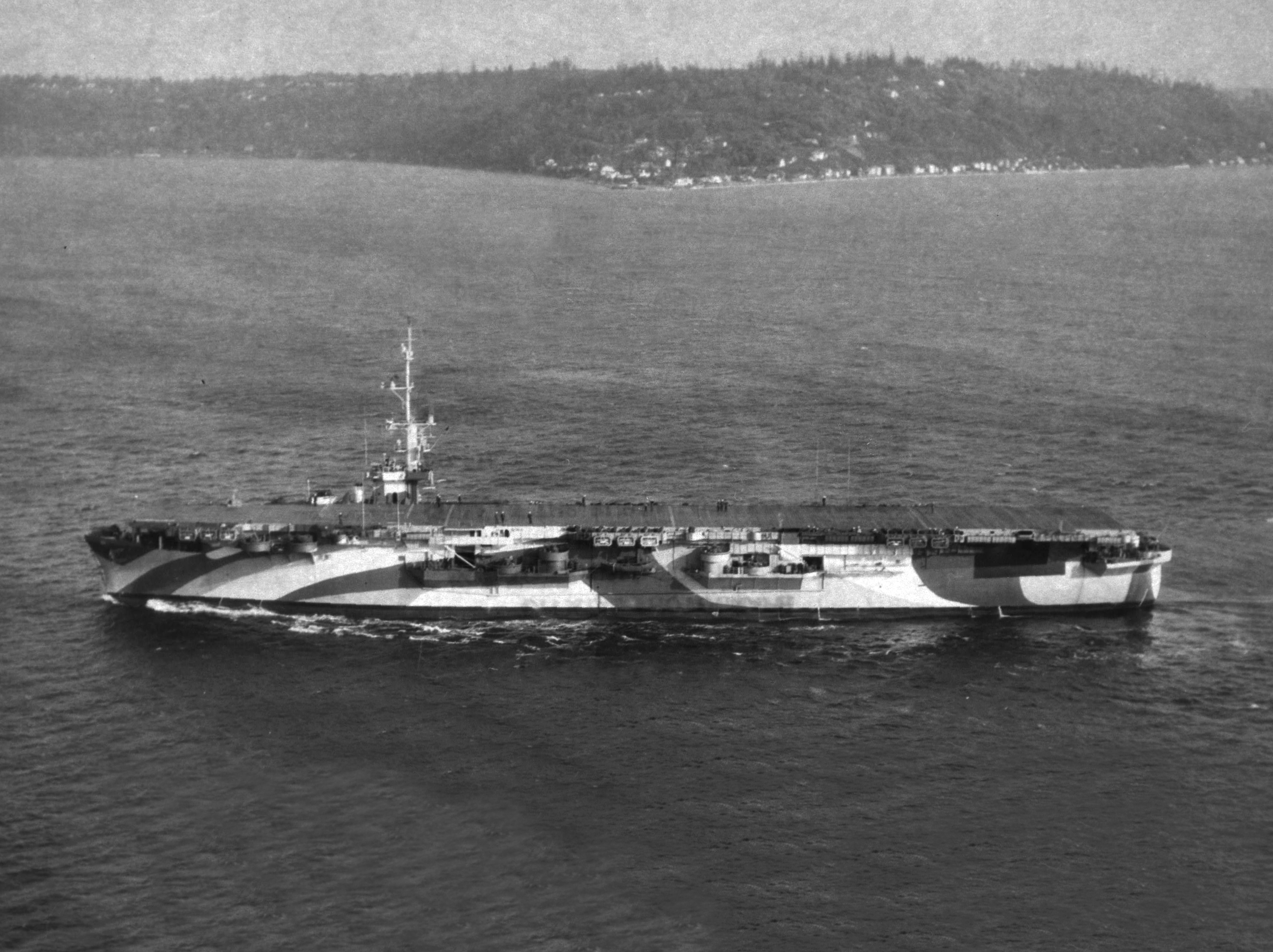
- USS Block Island on 13 January 1945

History

United States
- Name: Block Island
- Namesake: Block Island Sound
- Builder: Todd Pacific Shipyards
- Laid down: 25 October 1943
- Launched: 10 June 1944
- Commissioned: 30 December 1944
- Decommissioned: 27 August 1954
- Stricken: 1 July 1959
- Fate: Scrapped, 23 February 1960

General characteristics
- Class & type: Commencement Bay-class escort carrier
- Displacement: 21,397 long tons (21,740 t)
- Length: 557 ft 1 in (169.80 m) loa
- Beam: 75 ft (23 m)
- Draft: 32 ft (9.8 m)
- Installed power: 16,000 shp (12,000 kW); 4 × boilers
- Propulsion: 2 × Steam turbines; 2 × screw propellers
- Speed: 19 knots (35 km/h; 22 mph)
- Complement: 1,066
- Armament: 2 × 5 in (127 mm) dual-purpose guns; 36 × 40 mm (1.6 in) Bofors AA guns; 20 × 20 mm (0.8 in) Oerlikon AA guns
- Aircraft carried: 33
- Aviation facilities: 2 × aircraft catapults

USS Block Island was a Commencement Bay-class escort carrier of the United States Navy. The Commencement Bay class were built during World War II, and were an improvement over the earlier Sangamon class, which were converted from oil tankers. They were capable of carrying an air group of 33 planes and were armed with an anti-aircraft battery of 5 in (127 mm), 40 mm (1.6 in), and 20 mm (0.8 in) guns. The ships were capable of a top speed of 19 knots (35 km/h; 22 mph), and due to their origin as tankers, had extensive fuel storage.

She was launched on 10 June 1944 as Sunset Bay by Todd-Pacific Shipyards, Inc. Tacoma, Washington; sponsored by Mrs. E. J. (Grace) Hallenbeck (mother of Major Pappy Boyington, then a Prisoner of War of the Japanese), and commissioned as Block Island on 30 December 1944.

== Design ==
In 1941, as United States participation in World War II became increasingly likely, the US Navy embarked on a construction program for escort carriers, which were converted from transport ships of various types. Many of the escort carrier types were converted from C3-type transports, but the Sangamon-class escort carriers were instead rebuilt oil tankers. These proved to be very successful ships, and the Commencement Bay class, authorized for Fiscal Year 1944, were an improved version of the Sangamon design. The new ships were faster, had improved aviation facilities, and had better internal compartmentation. They proved to be the most successful of the escort carriers, and the only class to be retained in active service after the war, since they were large enough to operate newer aircraft.

Block Island was 557 ft 1 in (169.80 m) long overall, with a beam of 75 ft (23 m) at the waterline, which extended to 105 ft 2 in (32.05 m) at maximum. She displaced 21,397 long tons (21,740 t) at full load, of which 12,876 long tons (13,083 t) could be fuel oil (though some of her storage tanks were converted to permanently store seawater for ballast), and at full load she had a draft of 27 ft 11 in (8.51 m). The ship's superstructure consisted of a small island. She had a complement of 1,066 officers and enlisted men.

The ship was powered by two Allis-Chalmers geared steam turbines, each driving one screw propeller, using steam provided by four Combustion Engineering-manufactured water-tube boilers. The propulsion system was rated to produce a total of 16,000 shp (12,000 kW) for a top speed of 19 knots (35 km/h; 22 mph). Given the very large storage capacity for oil, the ships of the Commencement Bay class could steam for some 23,900 nautical miles (44,300 km; 27,500 mi) at a speed of 15 knots (28 km/h; 17 mph).

Her defensive anti-aircraft armament consisted of two 5 in (127 mm) dual-purpose guns in single mounts, thirty-six 40 mm (2 in) Bofors guns, and twenty 20 mm (1 in) Oerlikon light AA cannons. The Bofors guns were placed in three quadruple and twelve twin mounts, while the Oerlikon guns were all mounted individually. She carried 33 planes, which could be launched from two aircraft catapults. Two elevators transferred aircraft from the hangar to the flight deck.

== Service history ==
=== World War II ===
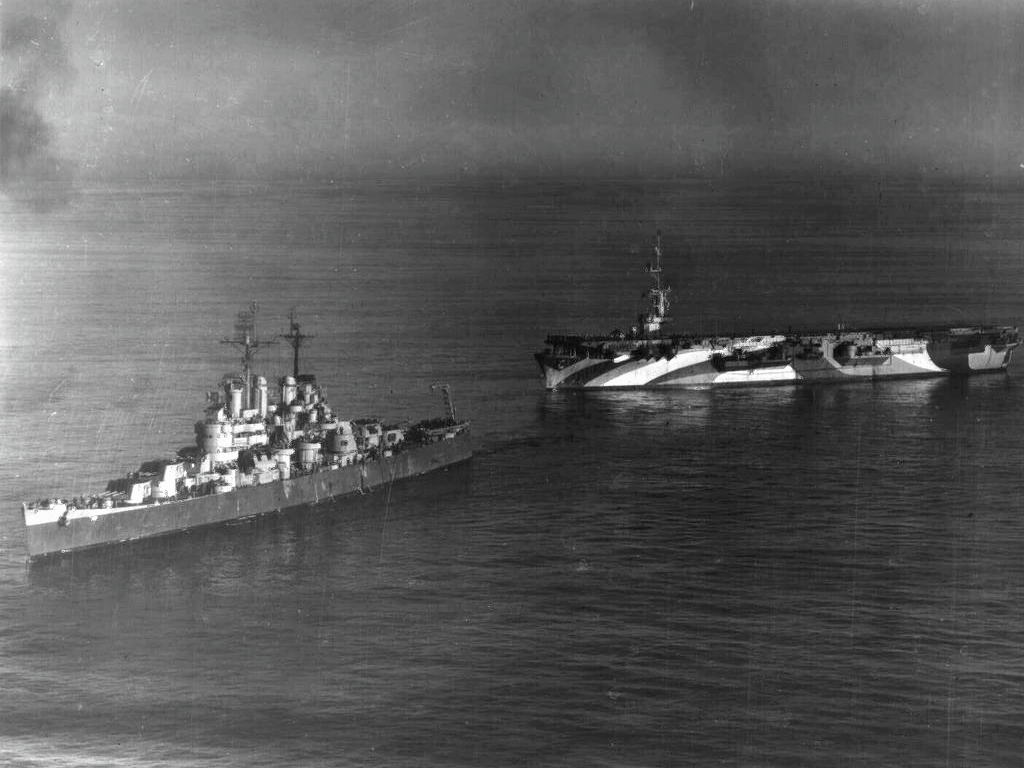
Block Island astern of the light cruiser Birmingham in January 1945

The first fifteen ships of the Commencement Bay class were ordered on 23 January 1943, allocated to Fiscal Year 1944. The ship was originally laid down as Sunset Bay at the Todd-Pacific Shipyards in Tacoma, Washington, on 25 October 1943. The ship was launched on 10 June 1944. While construction was still on-going on 5 July, she was renamed Block Island after the Block Island Sound, which lies between Block Island and the coast of Rhode Island. The ship was commissioned into active service on 30 December 1944. After completing final fitting out, the ship left Tacoma on 10 January for a short period of initial training in Puget Sound. She then stopped at the Puget Sound Navy Yard to take on ammunition and supplies, before departing for San Francisco, California, on 20 January. She arrived there two days later and loaded five picket boats and several damaged aircraft that were to be transported to San Diego, California. She left San Francisco on 24 January and arrived on the 26th, disembarked her cargo, and then began loading 5-inch High Velocity Aircraft Rockets.

Block Island's first aircraft came aboard on 3 February; these were eight Grumman F6F Hellcat fighters and eight Vought F4U Corsair fighters of squadron VMF-511, which formed part on Carrier Aircraft Service Division 1 (CASD). The next day, the ship went to sea to begin initial carrier operations training. The torpedo bomber squadron VMTB-233, which operated Grumman TBM Avengers, completed CASD 1 on 7 February. Three days later, the ship sailed in company with the destroyer Douglas H. Fox for what was to have been ten days of combat training off San Diego. These included live-fire training for the ship's aircraft. On 14 February, one of the ship's aircraft suffered a mechanical breakdown and crashed, though the pilot was recovered by the seaplane tender Childs. The weather worsened through the afternoon, and a flight of four fighters and six Avengers launched at 16:40 had to be recalled at 17:34 due to an approaching storm; only one Avenger was able to land on the carrier. The rest were redirected to the airfield on San Nicolas Island. But by the time they arrived there, the storm had reached the island. One Avenger crashed there, killing all three men aboard, as did a pair of Corairs, whose pilots also died. The flight leader attempted to land his Avenger first at San Nicolas, then at Santa Barbara, and ultimately at Bakersfield, but he also crashed before reaching the airfield, killing the three-man crew. Three other planes ditched at sea off San Nicholas, and three men were pulled from the water by Coast Guard rescue vessels. The remaining planes landed safely at San Nicolas. The incident forced the cancellation of training, as Block Island and Childs spent the next day searching for downed pilots before returning to San Diego.

Block Island thereafter resumed an intensive training schedule for the next month in preparation for deployment to the western Pacific to join the forces fighting Japan. She got underway on 20 March, bound for Pearl Harbor, carrying a load of 30 extra planes and 192 passengers in addition to her normal crew and complement of 36 planes. She arrived in Pearl Harbor on 26 March and disembarked the passengers and cargo; she then spent several weeks conducting combat training off Hawaii. Block Island departed Pearl Harbor on 17 April to join the fleet at its forward base at Ulithi in the Caroline Islands, in company with the destroyer Harry E. Hubbard. After passing through Eniwetok in the Marshall Islands on the way, the two ships arrived off Ulithi on 28 April. While approaching the atoll, they received reports of enemy aircraft approaching, and their crews observed American aircraft destroy a Nakajima B6N torpedo bomber. Block Island's anti-aircraft gunners accidentally opened fire on two American planes, but did not shoot them down before realizing they were friendly aircraft. The two ships anchored in Ulithi later that day and became part of Fifth Fleet, centered on the Fast Carrier Task Force.

==== Battle of Okinawa ====
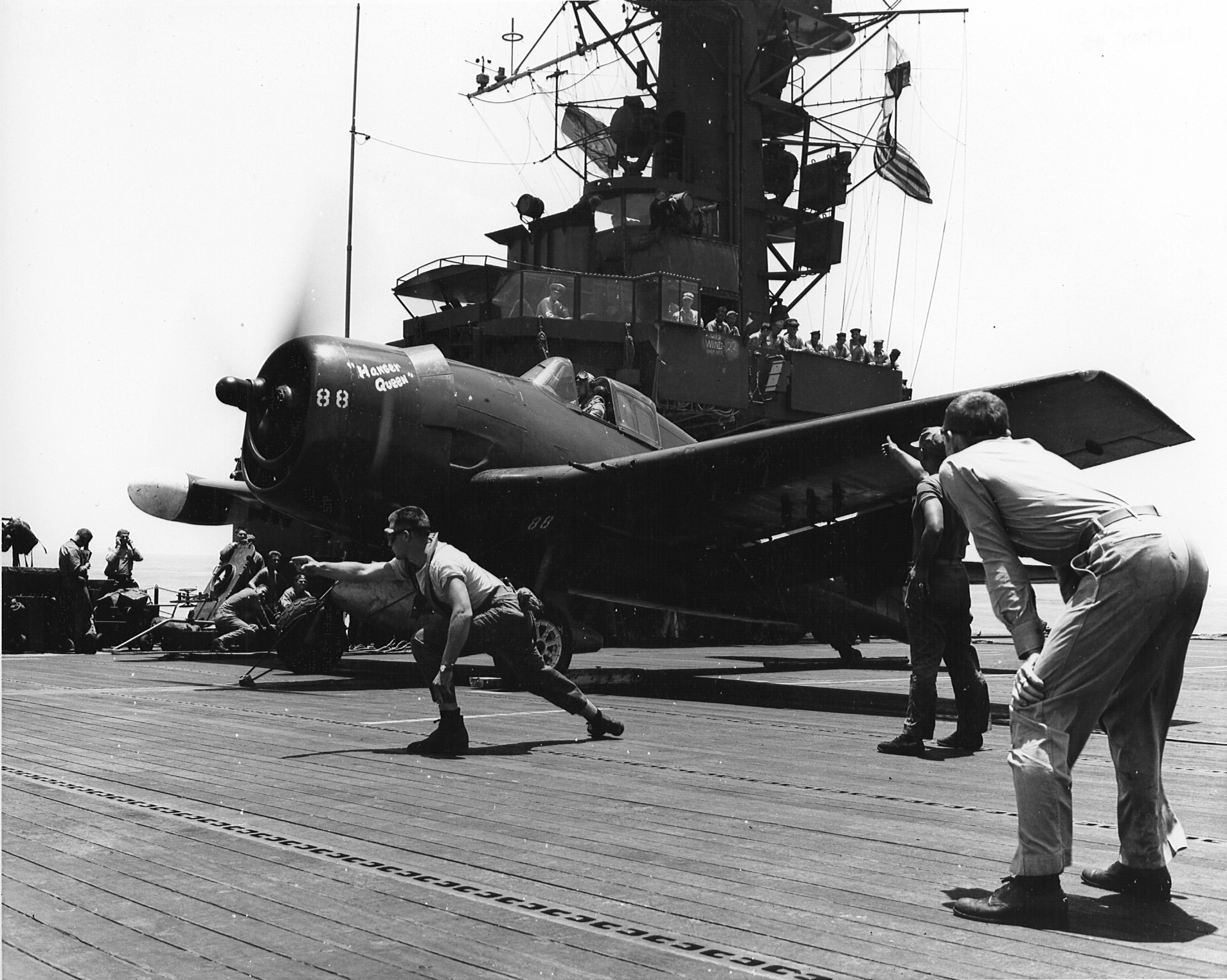
An F6F Hellcat aboard Block Island, preparing to launch for operations during the Battle of Okinawa

On 30 April, Block Island sortied with the destroyer Helm and destroyer escort Samuel S. Miles, bound for Okinawa, where US forces were engaged in a battle to seize the island. Block Island joined Task Unit 52.1.1, commanded by Rear Admiral Calvin Durgin, on 3 May some 64 nautical miles (119 km; 74 mi) southeast of Okinawa. The following day, she was transferred to Task Unit 52.1.3, commanded by Rear Admiral William Sample. There, she joined the escort carriers Suwannee, Santee, and Chenango. Over the course of the next week, Block Island contributed her aircraft to the combat air patrol to introduce them to combat operations.

The ship made her first aerial attack on Japanese positions on 10 May, first sending her TBMs to drop bombs and fire rockets at a Japanese strongpoint near the town of Naha. At around 12:00, several of her fighters were sent to strafe Japanese facilities on a nearby island. Later that afternoon, her planes were rearmed and refueled for a strike on airfields in the nearby Sakishima Islands. The strike force, which consisted of eight fighters and eight TBMs, struck airfields at Hirara and Nobara, damaging airfields and related infrastructure. Japanese defensive fire shot down two of the TBMs, though one of them managed to limp back to the carrier and ditch nearby, allowing its crew to be picked up by an escorting destroyer.

The following morning, the ship's pilots began further strikes on Japanese airfields in the Sakishima Islands, beginning with a fighter sweep over Ishigaki Island. A force of bombers and fighters then hit the airfield on Ishigaki, followed by another fighter sweep to attack any remaining opposition. Three of Block Island's planes were damaged by anti-aircraft fire, but they were able to return to the ship. A fourth plane was forced to land at Yontan on Okinawa due to damage to its hydraulic system, along with a bomb that had come loose from its hardpoint in the plane's bomb bay. Aircraft from the British Pacific Fleet then took over attacks on the Sakishima Islands on 11 May, allowing Block Island to return to direct operations on Okinawa itself.

Block Island remained in action off Okinawa for the next ten days as the fighting to secure the island persisted. On 22 May, the ship left for the nearby island of Kerama Retto to replenish ammunition and other supplies before returning to operations off Okinawa. These included strikes on 24 May on Shuri Castle, a major strong point of the Japanese defensive line in southern Okinawa. On the 27th, a sweep by four fighters over Ishigaki resulted in the death of VMF-511's commander after his aircraft failed to pull out of a dive during a rocket attack on the harbor facilities there. On 29 May, the ship's planes flew a total of 29 sorties against the airfields on Ishigaki and Miyako Island; during one raid on the former, one of the ship's TBMs was shot down by ground fire. The ship continued to operate off Okinawa for the next three weeks, and on 16 June, one of her Hellcats was shot down over Amami Ōshima. Later that day, Block Island transferred to Carrier Division 27, becoming the flagship of Rear Admiral Dixwell Ketcham. She then sailed south to the Philippines for operations elsewhere.

==== End of the war ====
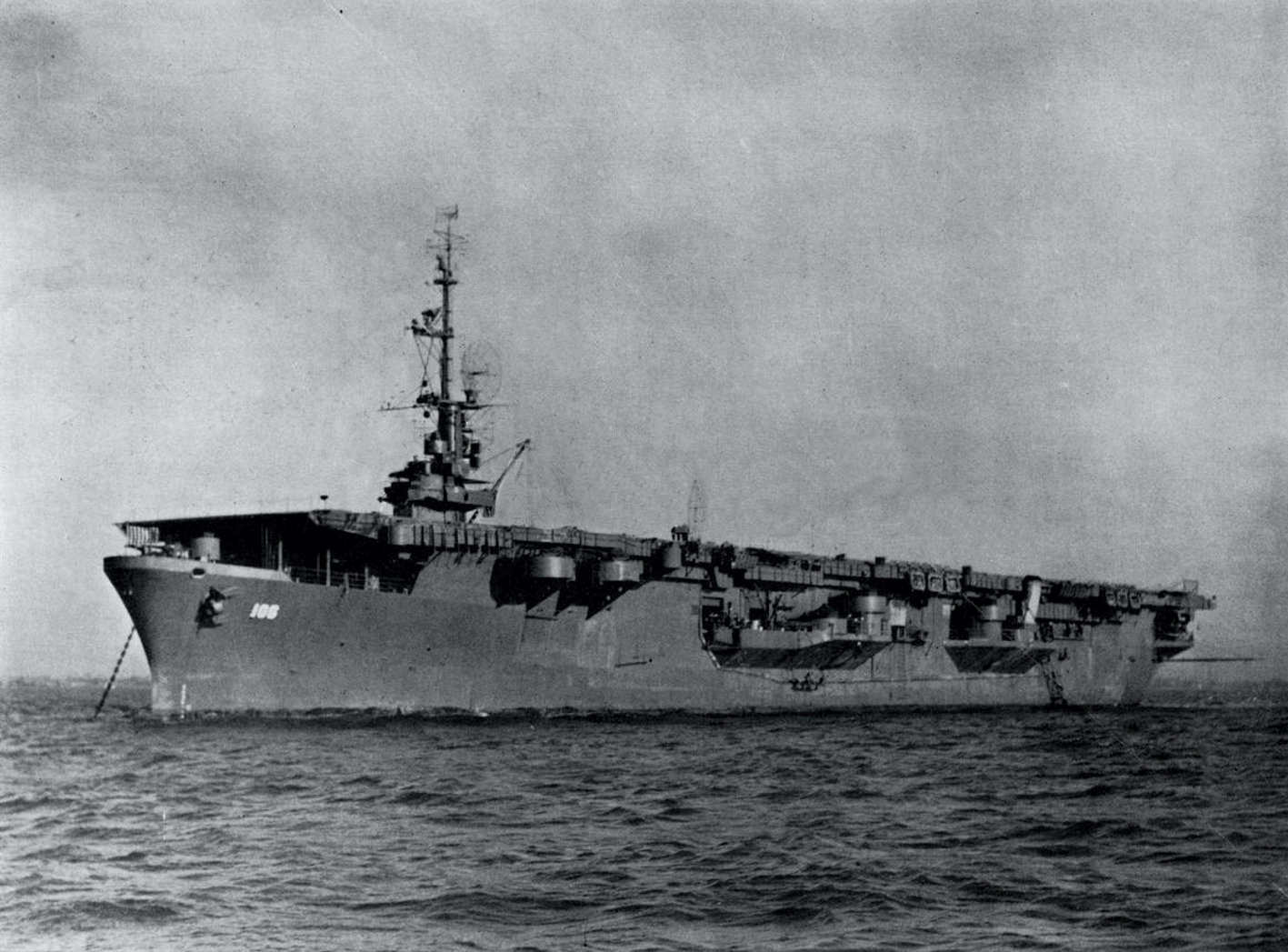
Block Island at anchor in 1945

On 19 June, Block Island arrived in Leyte Gulf in the northern Philippines for a brief period of rest before sortieing as part of the invasion fleet for what was to be the last major amphibious assault of the Pacific War. Block Island, her sister ship Gilbert Islands, and Suwannee departed with an escort of six destroyers, bound for Balikpapan on the island of Borneo. After arriving on 30 June, the carriers' planes began air strikes on Japanese positions there to cover the Australian assault on the town that began the following day. Block Island's pilots flew some 98 sorties over the following three days of combat operations. None of her aircraft were shot down during the fighting, and in the early hours of 3 July, one of her Hellcats shot down an Aichi E13A1 reconnaissance floatplane, which proved to be the only aerial victory claimed by the ship's fighters during the war. Following the end of Japanese resistance in the city, Block Island and the rest of the squadron returned north to the Philippines, though Block Island soon departed for Guam for repairs to her arresting gear.

The ship was still in Apra Harbor, Guam, during the atomic bombings of Hiroshima and Nagasaki on 6 and 9 August, respectively. She soon departed with Santee and four destroyers, bound for Leyte. The ships were still en route when their crews learned on 14 August that Japan would announce its decision to surrender the following day. At 16:30, the ships received news that the ceasefire had gone into effect. Block Island lay at Leyte from 17 to 28 August, when she departed as part of Task Group 77.1, which also included Santee and four destroyer escorts. They were to cover the minesweepers of Task Group 71.2, which were to clear mines blocking the entrance to Incheon, Korea. The ships sailed on 29 August and encountered a typhoon on the way; the storm lasted from 1 to 3 September, but the task groups avoided damage by staying to the south, near Formosa. The Allied powers learned of significant prisoner of war camps on the island during this period, and Ketcham, aboard Block Island, was ordered to send an advance team to Keelung to begin the process of liberating the camps. Block Island sent a group of 33 marines and a medical team aboard the destroyer escorts Thomas J. Gary and Kretchmer to Keelung.

Before the marines arrived, Ketcham prepared leaflets announcing the American forces that would be landing at Keelung, along with instructions for the Japanese garrison to begin preparing to evacuate the POWs. Several Corsairs were sent to drop the leaflets in Keelung and the airfield at Matsuyama on the morning of 5 September. Later that morning, Ketcham sent a TBM Avenger from Block Island to land at Matsuyama and make direct contact with the local commander. Marine Major Peter Folger ordered the commander to take him to the local camps so he could evaluate the situation and coordinate the relief effort. Aircraft carrying medicine and food were soon sent to Matsuyama, with orders conveyed between Folger and Block Island by one of her Hellcats, which orbited over the camps to relay radio messages. The planes flew in some 9,000 lb (4,100 kg) of supplies and the marine colonel who arrived with the landing party commandeered a train to carry the more than 1,000 POWs from the camps back to Keelung. There, they were taken aboard Thomas J. Gary and Kretchmer, which took the men back to the rest of the squadron. Space aboard Block Island was cleared for over 600 cots and fresh clothing and bedding was assembled. The ship's hangar deck was converted into a hospital for the former POWs who were in more serious condition. In total, more than 1,200 men were rescued from the camps; they were distributed between the ships of the group, and Block Island took 474 aboard. The ships sailed south on the morning of 6 September to take the men back to the Philippines. While en route, they met a British carrier task force that replaced them off Formosa to patrol over the camps, as there were still men who had to be left behind, as they were judged to be too sick for the voyage. Block Island arrived in Manila in the Philippines on 8 September and began transferring the men to shore.

Block Island left the Philippines on 17 September, bound for Okinawa, where she arrived three days later. She then joined a naval force sent to cover the landing of the Chinese Nationalist Army's 70th Army as they landed on the island at Keelung to retake control of Formosa from the defeated Japanese. These operations took place on 16 and 17 October. The ship then sailed for Saipan in the Mariana Islands, arriving there on 23 October. From there, she sailed to Guam, where she embarked passengers and aircraft that were no longer needed in the central Pacific, and departed for the United States. She stopped in Pearl Harbor on 2 December, before proceeding on to San Diego on 5 December. The ship reached her destination six days later, her role in the immediate postwar operations complete. For her service during the war, Block Island received two battle stars.

=== Post-War ===
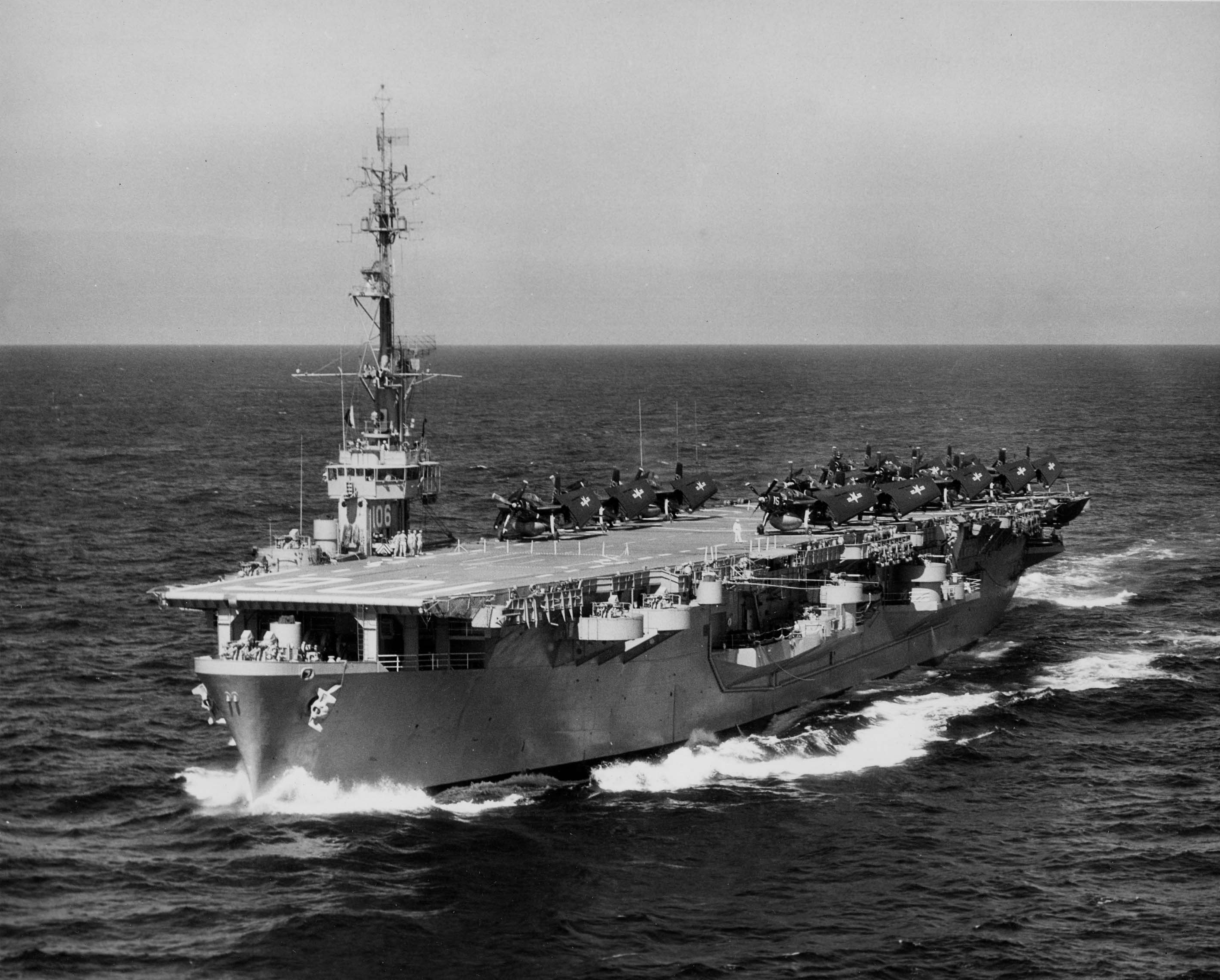
USS Block Island underway, summer 1953

On 5 January 1946, Block Island left San Diego for the last time, bound for the East Coast of the United States by way of the Panama Canal. She arrived in Norfolk, Virginia, on 20 January. For the next few months, she made cruises north to New York City and south to Guantanamo Bay, Cuba, after which she served as a training ship for naval recruits off the coast of Virginia. She was placed in reserve, but still in commission, on 28 May at Portsmouth, Virginia. She was soon moved to Norfolk, and then on 7 June sailed to Annapolis, Maryland. There, she resumed training duties, but for cadets at the United States Naval Academy.

Following the outbreak of the Korean War in mid-1950, the Navy badly needed operational warships, and so Block Island's career as a cadet training ship came to an end on 3 October 1950, when she was transferred to the Atlantic Reserve Fleet. She was placed out of commission to be overhauled at Norfolk in preparation for active service. On 25 October, she was moved to Philadelphia for further modifications. The work was completed by early 1951, and she was recommissioned on 28 April. The ship then underwent a lengthy fitting out period, and she finally went to sea on 5 January 1952 on a cruise to Guantanamo Bay. There, she took part in flight operations training that lasted until mid-March. Further training off the Virginia Capes followed, and in late April she took another cruise in the Caribbean that concluded on 27 April. She spent the rest of the year operating out of Norfolk.

On 5 January 1953, Block Island departed Hampton Roads, Virginia, bound for another training cruise to the West Indies that lasted more than a month. She then sailed north to the New York Naval Shipyard on 25 February for periodic maintenance. The ship then returned to Virginia for flight training exercises that lasted until mid-April. This was followed by a cruise to western Europe that began on 17 April. She visited several ports in the United Kingdom and then entered the Mediterranean Sea to visit Golfe-Juan, France, and Naples, Italy. She cruised in the Mediterranean before returning to Norfolk in late June. Later that year, Block Island embarked on another cruise in the Caribbean, Sikorsky HO4S helicopters assigned to the helicopter squadron HS-3. Following the cruise, the ship returned to the Philadelphia Naval Shipyard on 15 January 1954, where she was decommissioned on 27 August. By this time, the Navy had begun replacing the Commencement Bay-class ships with much larger Essex-class aircraft carriers, since the former were too small to operate newer and more effective anti-submarine patrol planes. Proposals to radically rebuild the Commencement Bays either with an angled flight deck and various structural improvements or lengthen their hulls by 30 ft (9.1 m) and replace their propulsion machinery to increase speed came to nothing, as they were deemed to be too expensive.

On 22 December 1957, she was redesignated as an amphibious assault ship with the hull number LPH-1, in anticipation of conversion under project SCB 159 to an amphibious assault ship. The program represented the culmination of Marine Corps tests through the late 1940s and 1950s using helicopters as a component of their "vertical assault" doctrine, which envisioned using helicopter-borne troops to seize strategic crossroads behind the lines while traditional amphibious forces went ashore. Work on Block Island began in January 1958, but by this time, the remaining Essex-class carriers that had not been converted to SCB-27 configuration had become available for use as amphibious assault ships. As a result, the project was cancelled before it was completed, and her designation reverted to CVE-106 in June. The ship was reclassified again on 7 May 1959, this time as a cargo ship and aircraft transport with the hull number AKV-38. She was struck from the Naval Vessel Register on 1 July, and was sold soon thereafter to the Japanese firm Kowa Koeki, based in Tokyo. The ship was towed to Japan and broken up in mid-1960.

== Awards ==
- Asiatic-Pacific Campaign Medal with two battle stars
- World War II Victory Medal
- Navy Occupation Medal with "EUROPE" and "ASIA" clasps
- China Service Medal
- National Defense Service Medal
