= Royal College =

Royal College may refer to:

== Conservatoires ==
- Royal College of Music, London, UK
- Royal College of Music, Stockholm, Sweden
- Royal College of Organists, Birmingham, UK

== Military and paramilitary ==
- Royal Police College (disambiguation)
- Royal Military College (disambiguation)
- Royal Naval College (disambiguation)
- Royal Air Force College (disambiguation)
- Royal College of Defence Studies, London, UK

== Professional bodies ==
- Any medical royal college; in the UK, some Commonwealth realms and Ireland, a professional body responsible for the development of and training in one or more medical specialties
- Royal College of Anaesthetists, UK
- Royal College of Dental Surgeons of Ontario
- Royal College of Dentists of Canada
- Royal College of General Practitioners, UK
- Royal College of Emergency Medicine, UK
- Royal College of Midwives
- Royal College of Nursing, UK
- Royal College of Obstetricians and Gynaecologists, UK
- Royal College of Paediatrics and Child Health, UK
- Royal College of Pathologists of Australasia
- Royal College of Pathologists, UK
- Royal College of Physicians, UK
- Royal College of Physicians of Edinburgh, UK
- Royal College of Physicians of Ireland
- Royal College of Physicians and Surgeons of Canada
- Royal College of Physicians and Surgeons of Glasgow, UK
- Royal College of Psychiatrists, UK
- Royal College of Radiologists, UK
- Royal College of Science for Ireland
- Royal College of Surgeons of Edinburgh, UK
- Royal College of Surgeons of England, UK
- Royal College of Surgeons in Ireland
- Royal College of Veterinary Surgeons, UK

== Schools ==
- Adolphe de Plevitz SSS, formerly Royal College Grand-Baie, Mauritius
- Panadura Royal College, Sri Lanka
- Royal Central College, Polonnaruwa, Sri Lanka
- Royal College, Colombo, Sri Lanka
- Royal College of Curepipe, Mauritius
- Royal College of St. Peter at Westminster, UK (Westminster School)
- Royal College Port-Louis (Mauritius), Mauritius

== Universities and colleges ==
- Royal College of Art, London, UK
- Royal College of Chemistry, London, UK (part of Imperial College London)
- Royal College of Engineering & Technology, Thrissur, Kerala, India
- Royal College of Mines, London, UK (now Royal School of Mines, part of Imperial College London)
- Royal College of Science, London, UK (part of Imperial College London)
- Royal College of Science, Arts and Commerce, Thane, Maharashtra, India
- Royal College of Science and Technology, Glasgow, UK (now the University of Strathclyde)

== Other uses ==
- Royal Australian College (disambiguation)
- Royal Australian and New Zealand College (disambiguation)
- Royal Canadian College (disambiguation)
- Royal College Building (disambiguation)
- Royal College Street, Camden, London, England, UK; a major thoroughfare
- Royal New Zealand College (disambiguation)

== See also ==
- Collège royal (disambiguation)
