= HNLMS Sumatra =

HNLMS Sumatra (Dutch: Hr.Ms. or Zr.Ms. Sumatra) may refer to following ships of the Royal Netherlands Navy:

- HNLMS Sumatra (1828), a Java-class frigate wrecked in 1830
- HNLMS Sumatra (1890), a small protected cruiser
- HNLMS Sumatra (1920), a Java-class cruiser
