= Java-class cruiser =

Class of light cruisers of the Royal Netherlands Navy

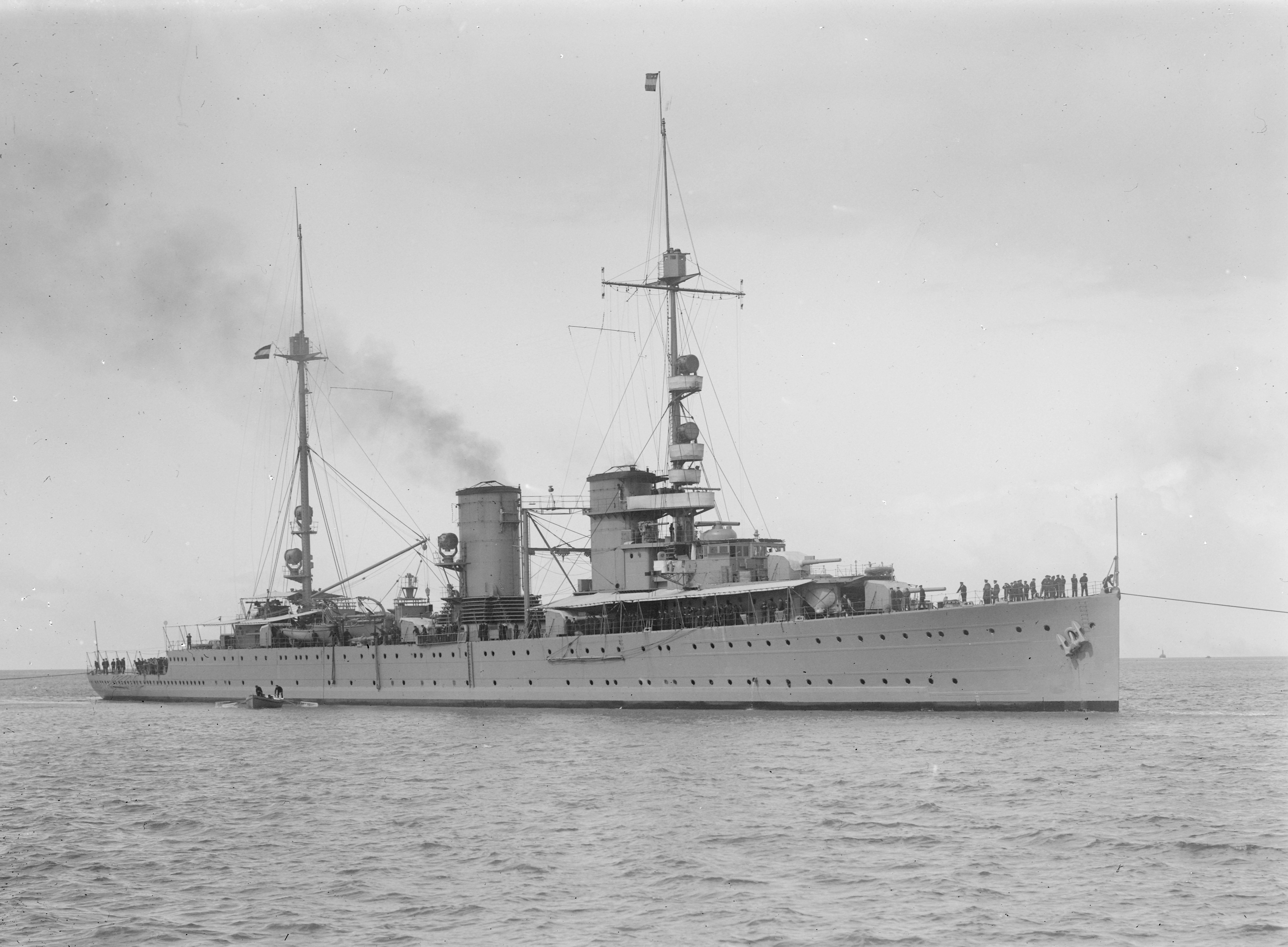
- Java soon after her commissioning, evident with her tall, slender, masts

Class overview
- Name: Java class
- Builders: Koninklijke Maatschappij de Schelde, Flushing; Nederlandsche Scheepsbouw Maatschappij, Amsterdam; Wilton-Fijenoord, Schiedam (planned)
- Operators: Royal Netherlands Navy
- Preceded by: Holland class
- Succeeded by: De Ruyter
- Built: 1916–1926
- In commission: 1925–1944
- Planned: 3
- Completed: 2
- Cancelled: 1
- Lost: 2

General characteristics as built
- Type: Light cruiser
- Displacement: 6,776 t (6,669 long tons) standard; 8,339 t (8,207 long tons) full load
- Length: 155.3 m (509 ft 6 in) oa
- Beam: 16 m (52 ft 6 in)
- Draught: 6.1 m (20 ft)
- Installed power: 8 boilers 73,000 shp (54,000 kW) (Java) 82,000 shp (61,000 kW) (Sumatra)
- Propulsion: 3 steam turbines; 3 propellers
- Speed: 31 knots (57 km/h; 36 mph)
- Range: 3,600 nmi (6,700 km; 4,100 mi) at 12 kn (22 km/h; 14 mph)
- Complement: 525
- Armament: 10 × 15.0 cm (5.9 in) guns; 8 (Java) or 6 (Sumatra) × Bofors 40 mm anti-aircraft guns; 8 × .5 in (13 mm) machine guns
- Armour: 7.5 cm (3 in) belt; 2.5 to 5 cm (0.98 to 1.97 in) deck; 12.5 cm (4.9 in) conning tower; 10 cm (3.9 in) shields
- Aircraft carried: 2 × floatplanes

The Java class was a series of light cruisers operated by the Royal Netherlands Navy during the interwar period and World War II. Designed to defend the Dutch East Indies against the Empire of Japan, the cruisers were designed in 1916 to be the best in the world. However, a series of issues due to World War I, supply chain issues, worker strikes, instability in Germany, and a change in national policy delayed the ships for more than a decade. Of the three ships planned, one was cancelled during a construction pause.

By the time the remaining two ships were launched in the mid 1920s, their design was outdated and little work was done to address the issue. Both ships saw action during World War II. HNLMS Sumatra was in the Netherlands when the country was invaded by Germany in 1940, and the cruiser fled to the United Kingdom. Under British control, she sailed around the world, was disarmed, and sunk as a breakwater off Normandy. HNLMS Java was in the East Indies when the Pacific War began in 1941, and joined Allied efforts in attempting to repulse several Japanese invasions. During the Battle of the Java Sea, she was torpedoed and promptly sunk.

== Design ==
=== Development ===
During the early 20th century, the primary purpose of the Royal Netherlands Navy was the protection of the oil-rich and economically vital Dutch East Indies. The largest threat was from the rapidly expanding Japanese Empire and its significantly larger and more powerful navy. Unable and unwilling to build a comparable force, the Netherlands focused on maintaining a small but high-quality fleet designed to delay any invasions until reinforcements from other European powers with similarly threatened colonies could arrive. In 1914, the Navy planned for a large expansion of its fleets, concerned about Japanese naval expansion and the need to maintain Dutch neutrality during World War I. One major aspect of the plan was the Java-class cruiser, intended to outperform all comparable cruisers, especially those of Japan. The new Japanese Chikuma-class scout cruiser–with 5,000 long tons (5,080 t) displacement, eight 15 cm (5.9 in) guns and a top speed of 26 knots (48 km/h; 30 mph)–was used as a template for what the new design needed to surpass.

The first two cruisers were ordered in 1915. However, Dutch naval architecture firms lacked experience with such ships. Instead, contracts for their design were offered to British and German companies. The contract was given to Germaniawerft who emphasized German technical assistance and German-made guns, turbines, and other equipment.

=== Characteristics ===
When the ships were designed in 1915, the Navy believed they were the most powerful and modern cruisers in the world. Armed with ten Bofors-built SK L/50 15 cm (5.9 in) caliber guns in single mounts–two on the bow, two on the stern, and three broadside guns on either side–the ships were the most well-armed of their kind. Anti-air weaponry consisted of two 7.5 cm (3 in) guns located below both masts, and four 12.7 mm (0.50 in) Vickers machine guns. They had an overall length of 155.3 metres (509 ft 6 in), a beam of 16 m (52 ft 6 in), a draught of 6.1 metres (20 ft), displacement of 6,776 tonnes (6,669 long tons) and were 8,339 t (8,207 long tons) at full load.

As designed, the ships were powered by three turbines supplied by eight boilers that provided 73,000 shaft horsepower (54,000 kilowatts) through three propellers for a top speed of 32 knots (59 km/h; 37 mph). Due to a bunkerage of 1,200 tons of oil, the ships had a cruising radius of 3,600 nautical miles (6,700 km; 4,100 mi) at a cruising speed of 12 knots (22 km/h; 14 mph). The waterline belt was 7.5 cm (3 in) thick for most of the ships' length, which tapered to 5.0 cm (2 in) towards the stern. The armored deck was 2.5–5.0 cm (0.98–1.97 in), funnel uptakes 5.0 cm (2 in), bulkheads 60 mm (2.4 in), and the conning tower 12.5 cm (4.9 in) thick. The main guns were protected by gun shields which were 10.0 cm (3.9 in) at the thickest.

Celebes, the third ship of the class, was intended to operate as the flagship of the East Indies Fleet and was about 3 m (9 ft 10 in) longer and 155 tonnes (153 long tons) heavier than the rest of her class. After she was canceled, Celebes' role of flagship was filled with the commissioning of De Ruyter in 1936.

== Construction ==
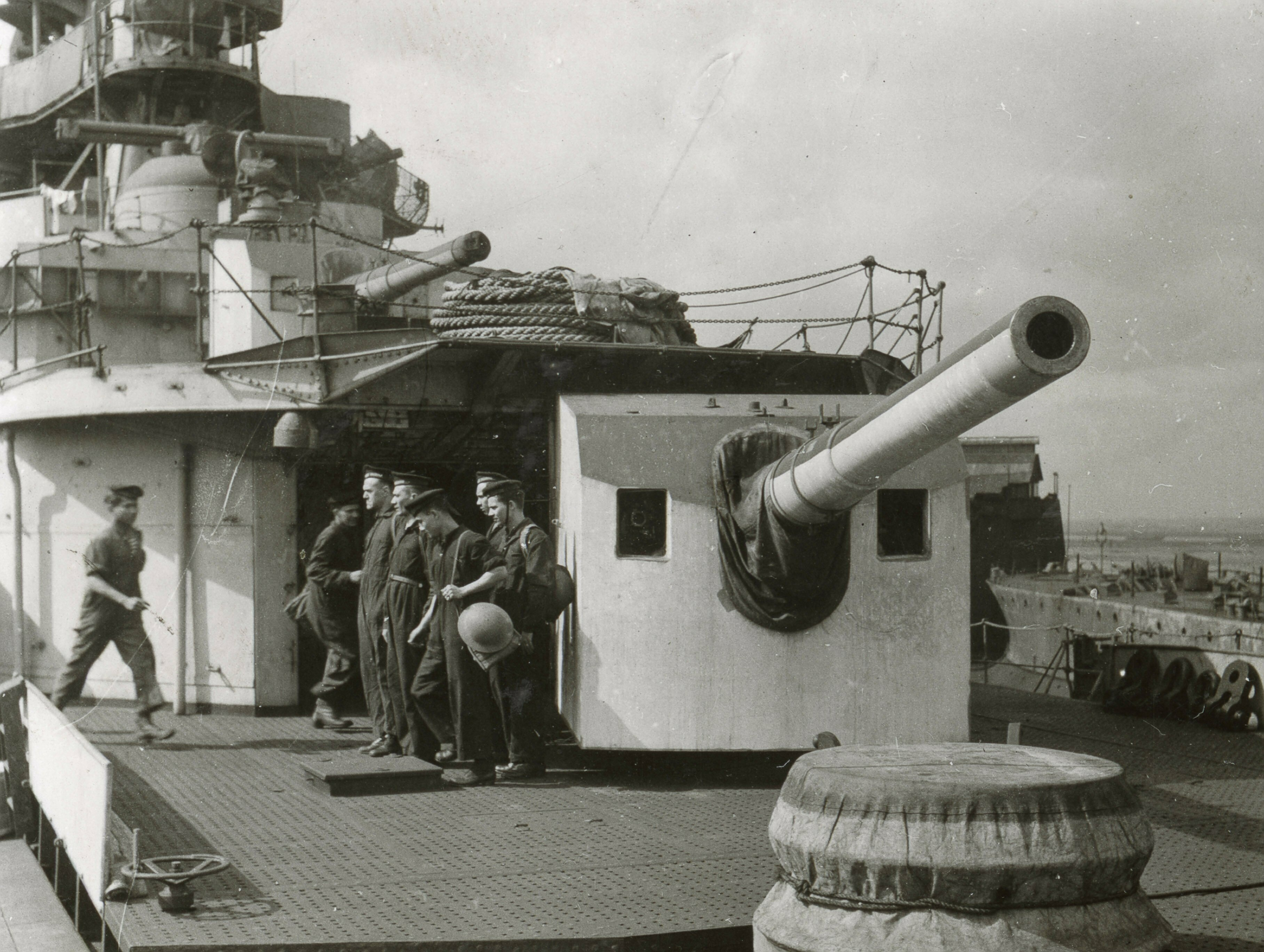
The class' delays made the ships immediately outdated, most obvious in their relatively unprotected and underwhelming armament (image from Sumatra).

Reliance on foreign expertise soon backfired as the German arms industry buckled and collapsed as a result of World War I and resulting political unrest throughout Germany. Construction stalled as materials were delayed and some parts never arrived at all. After the war, the Dutch government questioned the need to build new, expensive, warships. As a result, the newly-started Celebes was canceled and work on the other two ships was suspended. During the pause, the government explored alternative uses for the cruisers, including a proposal to convert them into English Channel ferries. Ultimately, the Navy successfully argued that completing the ships would be more cost-effective than abandoning them, and progress resumed in 1920. Both ships were launched over the next year as parts were sourced from countries such as the United Kingdom and Sweden, although eight SK L/50 15 cm (5.9 in) guns were found in a Krupp warehouse and were incorporated. Construction was further delayed by a series of strikes, the newly introduced 8-hour work day, supply issues, and a fire that destroyed turbines intended for the future Sumatra. New turbines for the cruiser were sourced, allowing her to produce 82,000 shp (61,000 kW).

The significant delays of her construction saw the ships outdated by the time she entered service, primarily regarding their armament. By 1922, the Washington Naval Treaty created a new standard of cruiser equipped with 203 mm (8 in) guns, which Japan heavily invested in. In addition, the single-barrel weapons protected only by gun-shields had already been replaced by enclosed, multi-gun turrets fed by independent magazines in other navies.

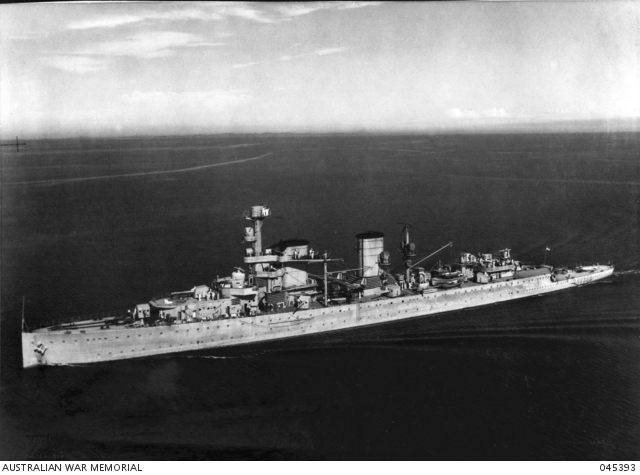
Java after her reconstruction, featuring thicker and shorter masts.

=== Modifications ===
Soon after the two ships entered service, they were fitted with two derricks and two floatplanes. Initially, the ships were equipped with the Fairey S.III, although it was fragile and replaced by the Fokker C.VII-w in 1927, itself later replaced by the Fokker C.XI-w in 1937. During the mid 1930s, the ships were refitted: the forward mast was rebuilt and shortened, and the anti-air weapons was expanded. Sumatra received three twin 4 cm (1.6 in) Bofors guns, while Java had two.

== Ships ==
Construction data
Name	Builder	Laid down	Launched	Commissioned	Fate
Java	Koninklijke Maatschappij de Schelde	31 May 1916	9 August 1921	1 May 1925	Sunk, 27 February 1942
Sumatra	Nederlandsche Scheepsbouw Maatschappij	15 July 1916	29 December 1920	26 May 1926	Scuttled, 9 June 1944
Celebes	Wilton-Fijenoord	—N/a	—N/a	—N/a	Cancelled, 1919

== Service history ==
=== Java ===
After she was commissioned, Java sailed to the East Indies and visited several cities throughout East Asia and Oceania. In 1937, she returned to Europe to escort convoys through the Strait of Gibraltar during the Spanish Civil War and underwent a refit in 1938. By 1939, she continued to escort convoys in Asia before she joined an Allied fleet and participated in several attempts to repulse Japanese invasions of the East Indies. After several failed attacks, the cruiser was torpedoed and sunk while attempting to prevent the invasion of Java during the Battle of the Java Sea. Her outdated design proved fatal as she lacked modern protections and redundancies. She was struck by a Japanese torpedo on her stern, which caused her aft magazine to detonate. The resulting explosion ripped apart the ship, and she sank in about 15 minutes with most of her crew.

=== Sumatra ===
Sumatra likewise operated with Java in the East Indies. Upon Java's return from her 1938 refit, Sumatra sailed to Europe where she also escorted convoys during the Spanish Civil War and served as a training ship. She was docked and awaited her own refit in May 1940 when Germany invaded the Netherlands. She then fled for the United Kingdom and was placed under the command of the British Royal Navy. The next month, she sailed for Canada to evacuate members of the Dutch Royal Family and later patrolled the Caribbean and mid-Atlantic for commerce raiding. Later that year, she returned to the East Indies, was retrofitted, and had her crew reassigned to other vessels. After war was declared against Japan, the cruiser fled Asia with only a portion of her crew and machinery online. She sailed around the world and arrived back to the United Kingdom. The Royal Navy viewed her as obsolete, and had her disarmed to replace worn-out weapons on other Dutch vessels and later had her sunk as a breakwater during the construction of an artificial harbor after the Invasion of Normandy.

== See also ==
- List of cruisers of the Netherlands

== Sources ==
- Cox, Jeffrey (2014). Rising Sun, Falling Skies: The Disastrous Java Sea Campaign of World War II. General Military. London: Bloomsbury Publishing. ISBN 978-1-4728-1060-1.
- Chesneau, Roger, ed. (1980). Conway's All the World's Fighting Ships 1922–1946. Greenwich: Conway Maritime Press. ISBN 0-85177-146-7.
- Noppen, Ryan K. (18 August 2020). The Royal Netherlands Navy of World War II. New Vanguard (1st ed.). Osprey Publishing. ISBN 978-1-47-284191-9.
- van Oosten, F. C. (1 January 1974). Warship Profile 40: Her Netherlands Majesty's Ship De Ruyter. Profile Publications. ISBN 978-0-85-383062-7.
- Whitley, Michael J. (January 1, 1996). Cruisers of World War Two: An International Encyclopedia (1st ed.). United States Naval Institute. ISBN 978-1-55-750141-7.
- Willigenburg, Henk van (2010). Dutch Warships of World War II. Lanasta. ISBN 978-9-08-616081-5.
