= Eugène Lacomblé =

Royal Netherlands Navy officer

Eugène Edouard Bernard Lacomblé
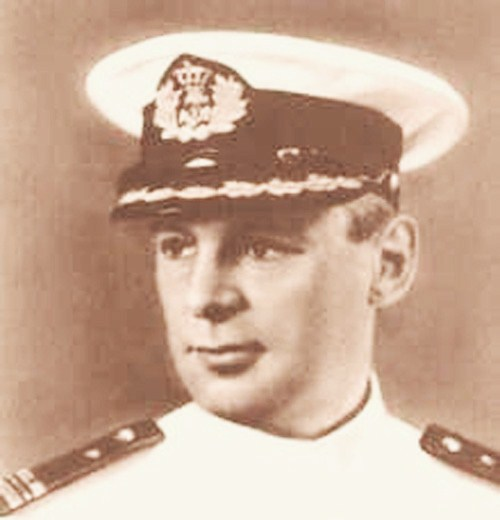
- Born: 16 October 1896; Arnhem, Netherlands
- Died: 28 February 1942 (aged 45); Java Sea
- Burial place: Java Sea
- Military career
- Allegiance: Netherlands
- Branch: Navy
- Service years: 1917–1942
- Rank: Kapitein-LtZ
- Commands: Douwe Aukes (1935–38), De Ruyter (1942)
- Conflicts: First World War; Second World War; Battle of the Java Sea
- Awards: Military William Order (knight, 4th class, posthumous)

Eugène Edouard Bernard Lacomblé (26 October 1896 – 28 February 1942) was an officer in the Royal Netherlands Navy from 1914 to 1942. He ended his career on board the ship HNLMS De Ruyter.

== Life ==
After Higher Civic School (Hogere Burger School, HBS), Lacomblé trained in navigation at the Royal Netherlands Naval College in Willemsoord in 1914. In 1917 he was promoted to lieutenant (Lieutenant ter Zee or LtZ) 3rd class and was posted to the East Indies. There he was assigned to the De Ruyter, then under the command of LtZ N. Maats. Three months later he was made lieutenant second class and posted to the torpedo service on board the torpedo training ship HNLMS Koningin Emma der Nederlanden. He then moved into submarines until the end of 1927, making some trips back to the Netherlands. In 1928, as lieutenant second class, he was made first officer on board the Brino and within a year rose to lieutenant first class.

In 1931 he went to the East Indies for the third time, this time on the mail-ship Christiaan Huygens. Upon arrival in Surabaya he was, as first officer, placed in the Naval Barracks at Goebeng. At the start of 1932 he was transferred to HNLMS De Zeven Provinciën and in the summer was made equipagemeester of the Surabaya Naval Establishment. Three years later he returned to the Netherlands and at the end of 1935 was given command of the minelayer Douwe Aukes, stationed at Ostend and Rouen. He then spent a few months on the naval staff at the Department of Defence. In 1938 Lacomblé went to the East Indies for the fourth and final time, now on board M.S. Marnix van Sint Aldegonde. After arriving there he was made first officer of the cruiser De Ruyter, then commanded by KtZ H.J. Bueninck. On 1 February 1940 Lacomblé was promoted to Kapitein-LtZ. During the Japanese invasion of the East Indies he was the commander of the De Ruyter, from which Karel Doorman commanded the 'Combined Striking Force'. On 27 February the De Ruyter was hit by a Japanese torpedo during the Battle of the Java Sea and Doorman and Lacomblé ordered the crew to abandon ship, though they went down with it themselves.

Lacomblé's widow (Leonie) and 12-year old son were evacuated from the East Indies by Catalina flying boat on the night of 2 March. Arriving in Broome, Australia, they were caught in a Japanese air raid that sank the aircraft and Leonie was killed.

== Honours ==
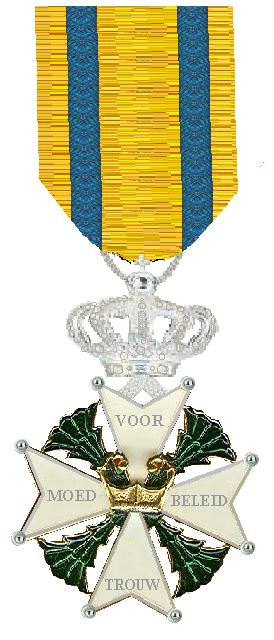
Military William Order

- He won the ereteken for long service as an officer.
- On 28 May 1949 he was made Knight, 4th class in the Military William Order
