= Royal Conservatory of Music (disambiguation) =

The Royal Conservatory of Music is a music school and performance venue in Toronto, Canada.

Royal Conservatory may also refer to:

== Belgium ==
- Royal Conservatoire of Antwerp
- Royal Conservatory of Brussels
- Royal Conservatory of Ghent
- Royal Conservatory of Liège

== United Kingdom ==
- Royal Academy of Music, London,
- Royal Birmingham Conservatoire
- Royal College of Music (RCM), London
- Royal Conservatoire of Scotland
- Royal Northern College of Music, Manchester
- Royal Welsh College of Music & Drama, Wales

== Other countries ==
- Dresden Royal Conservatory, Germany
- Madrid Royal Conservatory, Spain
- Royal College of Music, Stockholm, Sweden
- Royal Conservatory of The Hague, Netherlands
- Royal Irish Academy of Music, Dublin, Ireland

== See also ==
- Royal College (disambiguation)
