= List of cruisers of the Netherlands =

The following is a list of cruisers of the Netherlands grouped by type.

Key
Armament	The number and type of the primary armament
Armor	The thickness of the deck or belt armor
Displacement	Ship displacement at full combat load
Propulsion	Number of shafts, type of propulsion system, and top speed generated
Cost	Cost of the ship's construction
Service	The dates work began and finished on the ship and its ultimate fate
Laid down	The date the keel began to be assembled
Commissioned	The date the ship was commissioned

== Unprotected cruiser ==
- Atjeh class
  - Atjeh (1876)
  - Tromp (1877)
  - Koningin Emma der Nederlanden (ex-De Ruyter) (1879) – Captured by Germany 14 May 1940, scuttled ~1943
  - De Ruyter (1880)
  - Van Speyk (1882)
  - Johan Willem Friso (1886)

== Protected cruiser ==
=== Sumatra ===
Ship	Armament	Armor	Displacement	Propulsion	Service		
Ship	Armament	Armor	Displacement	Propulsion	Laid down	Commissioned	Fate
Sumatra	1 × 8.2 in (21 cm) gun 1 × 5.9 in (15 cm) gun 2 × 4.7 in (12 cm) guns	40 mm (2 in)	1,693 tons	2,350 ihp (1,752 kW)	26 April 1890	1 April 1891	Sold, 1907

=== Koningin Wilhelmina der Nederlanden ===
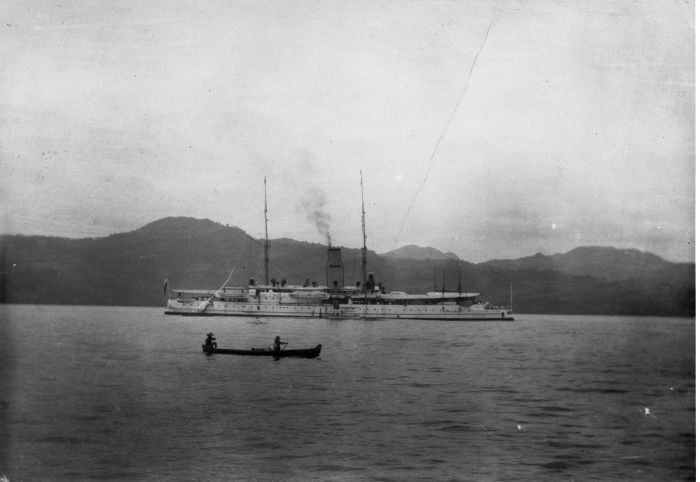
Koningin Wilhelmina der Nederlanden at Ambon.

Ship	Armament	Armor	Displacement	Propulsion	Service		
Ship	Armament	Armor	Displacement	Propulsion	Laid down	Commissioned	Fate
Koningin Wilhelmina der Nederlanden	1 × 11 in (28 cm) gun 1 × 8.2 in (21 cm) gun 2 × 6.7 in (17 cm) guns 4 × 3 in (7.6 cm) guns	50 mm (2.0 in)	4,530 tons	4,600 ihp (3,430 kW)	22 October 1892	17 April 1894	Sold, 1910

=== Holland class ===
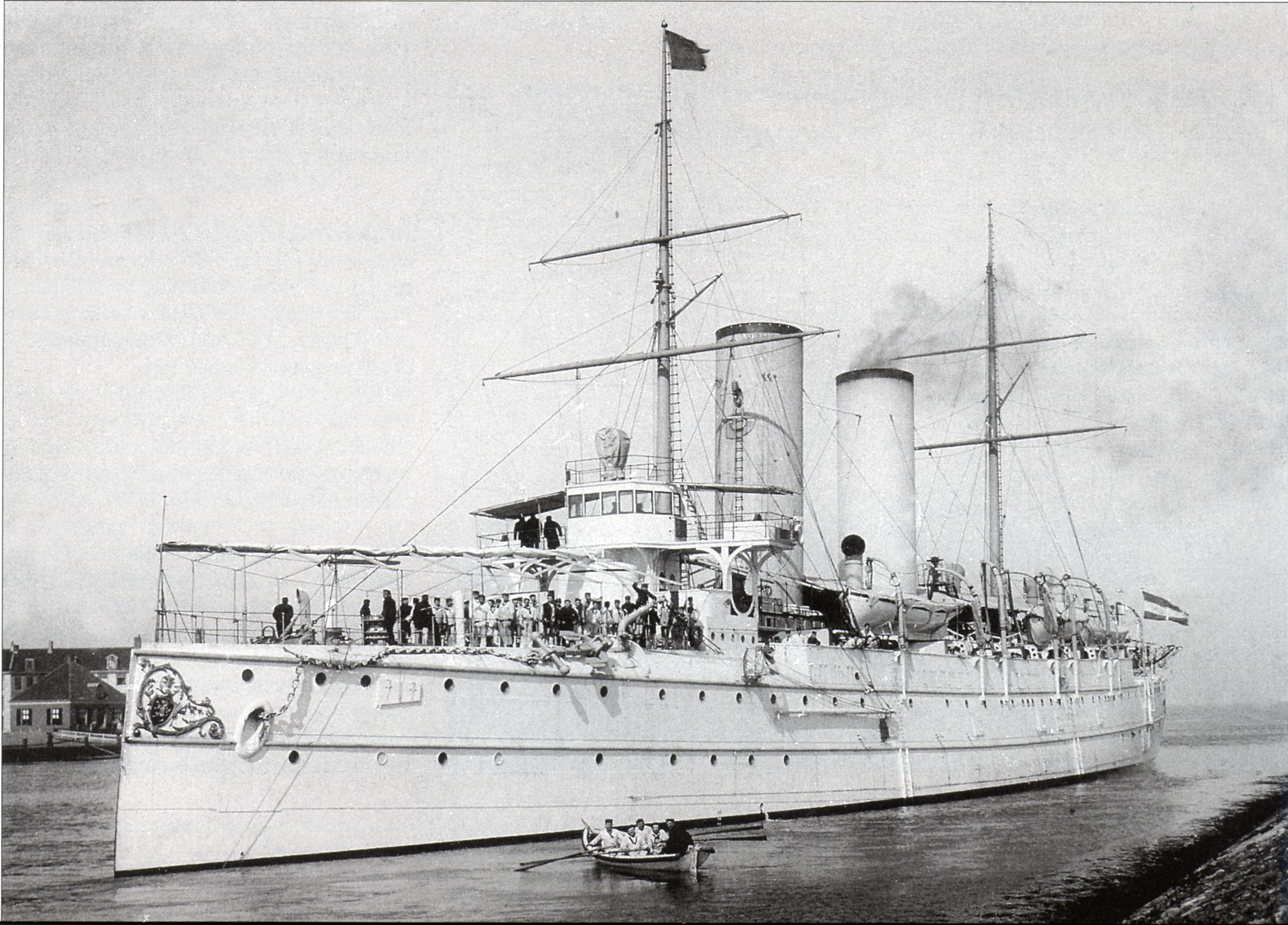
Noordbrabant

Ship	Armament	Armor	Displacement	Propulsion	Service		
Ship	Armament	Armor	Displacement	Propulsion	Laid down	Commissioned	Fate
Holland	2 × 5.9 in (15 cm) guns 6 × 4.7 in (12 cm) guns 4 × 3 in (7.6 cm) guns	50 mm (2.0 in)	3,900 tons	10,000 ihp (7,457 kW), two shafts	1895	1 July 1898	Stricken, 1920
Zeeland	2 × 5.9 in (15 cm) guns 6 × 4.7 in (12 cm) guns 4 × 3 in (7.6 cm) guns	50 mm (2.0 in)	3,900 tons	10,000 ihp (7,457 kW), two shafts	1895	1 June 1898	Stricken, 1924
Friesland	2 × 5.9 in (15 cm) guns 6 × 4.7 in (12 cm) guns 4 × 3 in (7.6 cm) guns	50 mm (2.0 in)	3,900 tons	10,000 ihp (7,457 kW), two shafts	1895	16 January 1898	Stricken, 1913
Gelderland	2 × 5.9 in (15 cm) guns 6 × 4.7 in (12 cm) guns 4 × 3 in (7.6 cm) guns	50 mm (2.0 in)	4,033 tons	10,000 ihp (7,457 kW), two shafts	1 November 1897	15 July 1900	Sunk by Russian aircraft on 16 July 1944 while in German service
Noordbrabant	2 × 5.9 in (15 cm) guns 6 × 4.7 in (12 cm) guns 4 × 3 in (7.6 cm) guns	50 mm (2.0 in)	4,033 tons	10,000 ihp (7,457 kW), two shafts	31 August 1897	1 March 1900	Scuttled on 17 May 1940
Utrecht	2 × 5.9 in (15 cm) guns 6 × 4.7 in (12 cm) guns 4 × 3 in (7.6 cm) guns	50 mm (2.0 in)	4,033 tons	10,000 ihp (7,457 kW), two shafts	1897	1 March 1901	Scrapped, 1913

== Light cruisers ==
=== Java class ===
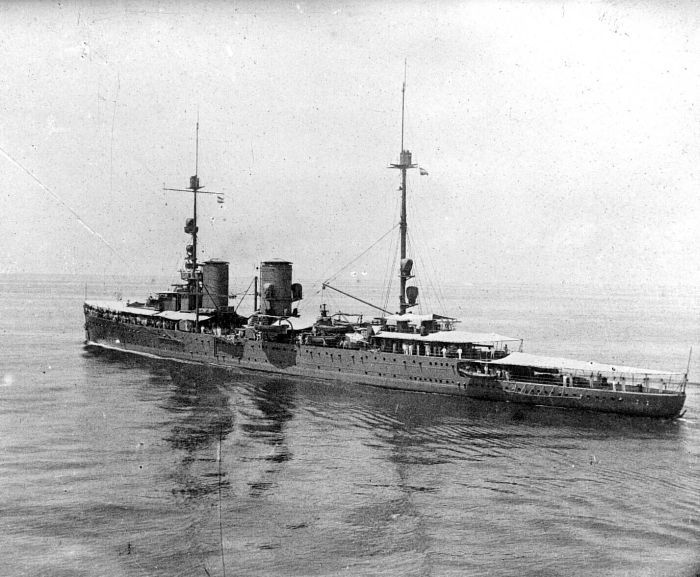
Java

Ship	Armament	Armor	Displacement	Propulsion	Service		
Ship	Armament	Armor	Displacement	Propulsion	Laid down	Commissioned	Fate
Java	10 × 15 cm (5.9 in) guns	25–50 mm (0.98–1.97 in)	6,670 tons standard 8,087 tons full load	3 shafts, 3 steam turbines, 73,000 shp (54,436 kW)	1916	1 May 1925	Sunk, Battle of Java Sea, 27 February
Sumatra	10 × 15 cm (5.9 in) guns	25–50 mm (0.98–1.97 in)	6,670 tons standard 8,087 tons full load	3 shafts, 3 steam turbines, 73,000 shp (54,436 kW)	1916	26 May 1926	Scuttled, Operation Overlord, 9 June 1944
Celebes	10 × 15 cm (5.9 in) guns	25–50 mm (0.98–1.97 in)	Slightly larger than the other two ships	3 shafts, 3 steam turbines, 73,000 shp (54,436 kW)	—	—	Canceled

=== De Ruyter ===
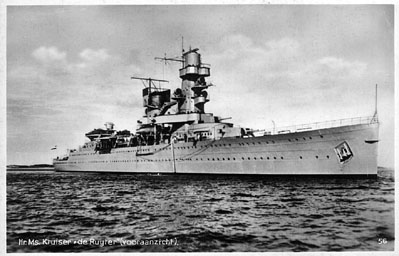
De Ruyter

Ship	Armament	Armor	Displacement	Propulsion	Service		
Ship	Armament	Armor	Displacement	Propulsion	Laid down	Commissioned	Fate
De Ruyter	7 × 15 cm (5.9 in) guns	30 mm (1.2 in)	6,442 tons standard 7,822 tons full load	2 shafts, 3 steam turbines, 66,000 shp (49,216 kW)	16 September 1933	3 October 1936	Sunk during the Battle of the Java Sea on 28 February 1942

=== Tromp class ===
- HNLMS Tromp (1937) – Decommissioned in 1955, sold for scrap in 1969
- HNLMS Jacob van Heemskerck (1939) – completed as an anti-aircraft cruiser – Decommissioned in 1969, sold for scrap in 1970

=== De Zeven Provinciën class ===
- HNLMS De Ruyter (C801) (1944) – completed as an anti-aircraft cruiser – Sold to Peru in 1973 and renamed Almirante Grau
- HNLMS De Zeven Provinciën (C802) (1950) – completed as an anti-aircraft cruiser – Sold to Peru in 1976 and renamed Aguirre

== See also ==
- List of monitors of the Netherlands
- List of battleships of the Netherlands
- List of ships of the Royal Netherlands Navy

== Sources ==
- Gray, Randal; Gardiner, Robert (1 January 1985). Conway's All the World's Fighting Ships, 1906–1921 (1st ed.). Naval Institute Press.
- Whitley, Michael J. (January 1, 1996). Cruisers of World War Two: An International Encyclopedia (1st ed.). United States Naval Institute. ISBN 978-1557501417.
