= Royal police =

Royal police may refer to:

- Royal Air Force Police (RAFP)
- Royal Australian Corps of Military Police (RACMP)
- Royal Bhutan Police (RBP)
- Royal Brunei Police Force (RBPF)
- Royal Canadian Mounted Police (RCMP)
- Royal Cayman Islands Police Service (RCIPS)
- Royal Falkland Islands Police (RFIP)
- Royal Gibraltar Police (RGP)
- Royal Grenada Police Force (RGPF)
- Royal Malaysia Police (RMP)
- Royal Marines Police (RMP)
- Royal Military Police (RMP)
- Royal Montserrat Police Service (RMPS)
- Royal Navy Police (RNP)
- Royal Oman Police (ROP)
- Royal Police Force of Antigua and Barbuda (RPFAB)
- Royal Saint Lucia Police (RSLP)
- Royal Thai Police (RTP)
- Royal Virgin Islands Police Force (RVIPF)
- Royal Police College (disambiguation)
- Royal Police Escort, Norway

== Former royal police ==
- Royal Barbados Police Force (RBPF) (1966-2021)
- Royal Fiji Police Force (RFPF) (1965-1987)
- Royal Hong Kong Police (RHKP) (1969-1997)
- Royal Irish Constabulary (RIC) (1867-1922)
- Royal Lao Police (RLP) (1950-1975)
- Royal Parks Constabulary (RPC) (1872-2004)
- Royal Ulster Constabulary (RUC) (1922-2001)
