= Karel Doorman =

Royal Netherlands Navy officer

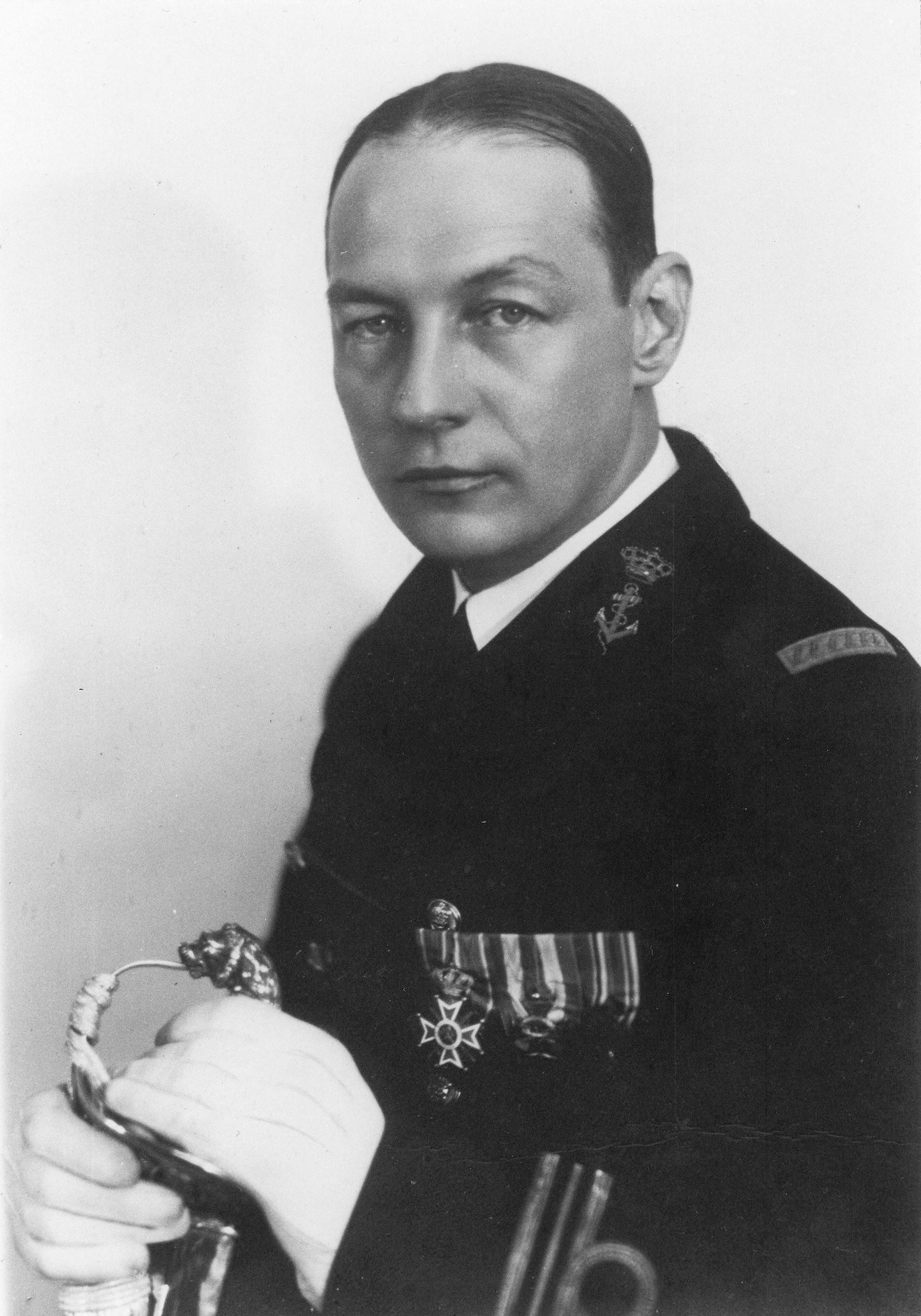
- Doorman in 1930
- Born: Karel Willem Frederik Marie Doorman; 23 April 1889; Utrecht, Netherlands
- Died: 28 February 1942 (aged 52); Java Sea
- Military career
- Allegiance: Netherlands
- Branch: Royal Netherlands Navy
- Service years: 1906–1942
- Rank: Schout-bij-nacht
- Commands: HNLMS Prins van Oranje; HNLMS Witte de With; HNLMS Evertsen; HNLMS Sumatra; HNLMS Java; Naval Aviation, East Indies; East Indies Squadron; ABDA Combined Striking Force
- Conflict: World War II; Dutch East Indies Campaign; Battle of Makassar Strait; Battle of Badung Strait; Battle of the Java Sea †
- Awards: Military Order of William; Order of the Netherlands Lion; Order of Orange-Nassau

Karel Willem Frederik Marie Doorman (23 April 1889 – 28 February 1942) was a Royal Netherlands Navy officer who during World War II commanded remnants of the short-lived American-British-Dutch-Australian Command naval strike forces in the Battle of the Java Sea. He was killed in action when his flagship HNLMS De Ruyter was torpedoed during the battle, having chosen to go down with the ship.

== Biography ==
=== Early career ===
Doorman was born 1889 in Utrecht, and raised as a Roman Catholic from a military family. In 1906, he and his brother Lou ACM Doorman were commissioned as midshipmen. In 1910, he was promoted to officer and moved to the Dutch East Indies aboard the cruiser Tromp. During his first three years of duty from January 1912 to December 1913, he was placed aboard the survey vessels HNLMS van Doorn and HNLMS Lombok and was mainly tasked with mapping the coastal waters of New Guinea. Early in 1914, he returned to the Netherlands on board the cruiser De Ruyter. In March 1914, he requested a transfer to the Aviation Service.

In April 1914, Doorman served on the Noord-Brabant during its mission to the Principality of Albania to recover the body of Major Lodewijk Thomson of the International Gendarmerie. Doorman's transfer to the Aviation Service was approved in mid-1915 and he became one of the first naval officers to be awarded his pilot wings.

=== Naval aviator ===
From 1915 to 1918, Doorman was stationed at Soesterberg with the Aviation Service under the command of Captain (later Major) of Engineers Henk Walaardt. There, he met Albert Plesman, an observer who later became a pilot. In 1915, Doorman was awarded a civilian pilot's license and in 1916 he was awarded a naval pilot's license. From 1917 to 1921, he was an instructor at Soesterberg Air Base and from October 1918 at the Naval Air Base De Kooy in Den Helder. Doorman commanded this Naval Air Base from 1919 to 1921. Because of his merits as an organizer in the nascent field of naval aviation, he was made a Knight of the Order of Orange-Nassau in 1922.

Budget cuts and an arm injury ended Doorman's active flying career but from November 1921 to November 1923, he attended the Higher Naval School in The Hague; this training, which included coursework in aircraft and naval vessel communication, laid the groundwork for his later career. After he completed this training, he was placed with the Department of the Navy at Batavia in December 1923.

=== Personal life ===
From 1919 to 1934, Doorman was married to Justine A.D. Schermer. Their son Joop Doorman was born in 1928. The marriage ended in 1934, soon after the birth of a third child. That same year, Doorman married Isabella J.J.J. Heyligers, with whom he had a fourth child.

=== Later naval career ===
In 1926, for the first time in eleven years, Doorman gained a longer appointment aboard the armored naval vessel De Zeven Provinciën. Until late 1927, he was the ship's gunnery officer and later also became its first officer. Early in 1928, Doorman returned to the Netherlands, where he ran equipment-purchasing for The Hague's Naval Aviation department. In 1932, under his command, the mine-layer HNLMS Prins van Oranje sailed three times in the same year to the Dutch East Indies. The same year, he also commanded two destroyers; Witte de With and Evertsen; the latter saw action against the rebels on HNLMS De Zeven Provinciën in February 1933.

In January 1934, Doorman returned to the Netherlands with Evertsen and spent three years as Chief of Staff of the naval commander in Den Helder. In 1936, he submitted a request to the Secretary of Defense to command a cruiser in the Dutch East Indies. Consequently, he departed as a captain in 1937 for the Dutch East Indies, commanding the cruisers Sumatra and Java. In August 1938, he was appointed Commander of Naval Aviation in the Dutch East Indies. From his headquarters at Surabaya Morokrembangan Naval Air Station, he made a number of inspection tours in the archipelago.

=== World War II ===
On 16 May 1940, Doorman was promoted to rear-admiral and on 13 June 1940, on board the light cruiser De Ruyter, he took command of the squadron previously led by Rear-Admiral GW Stöve at Surabaya. In early 1942 he led remnants of the ABDA Combined Striking Force.

On February 3, Doorman led a group of ships that went to stop a Japanese invasion force that was heading towards Makassar. While en route, his flotilla was observed by the Japanese and bombed, forcing it to turn back after several ships were damaged. This conflict was known as Battle of Makassar Strait, also called the Battle of the Flores Sea.

On 18 February, Japanese forces invaded Bali. Doorman led another force attempting to stop the invasion the next day. Due to the short notice and the challenge of consolidating his troops, three waves of counterattacks were planned. The first wave involving cruisers and destroyers was unsuccessful, culminating in the sinking of the Dutch destroyer Piet Hein. The second wave, consisting of a Dutch cruiser and several American destroyers was also unsuccessful, although they caused severe damage to a Japanese destroyer. The third wave of patrol boats encountered no Japanese forces. The failure to stop the Japanese led to the occupation of Bali. This engagement is known as the Battle of Badung Strait.

Doorman was killed in action when De Ruyter was hit by a Japanese Long Lance torpedo and sunk in the Battle of the Java Sea. Part of the crew was rescued but Doorman, following navy tradition, chose to go down with his ship. On 5 June 1942, he was posthumously made a Knight 3rd class in the Military William Order. The medal was awarded to the rear admiral's eldest son on 23 May 1947 by Lieutenant-Admiral Conrad Helfrich on board HNLMS Karel Doorman. The ceremony was attended by Prince Bernhard.

=== "I am attacking, follow me" ===
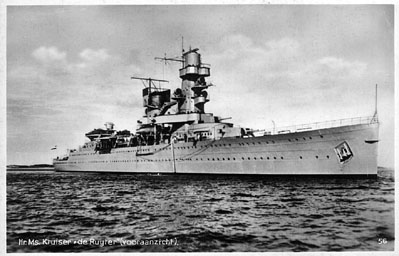
HNLMS De Ruyter

Karel Doorman is often honoured because he signaled "Ik val aan, volg mij" ("I am attacking, follow me") during the Battle of the Java Sea, which some have considered gallant. However, one source doubts that he ever uttered those words.

On 27 February 1942, at approximately 4pm, the Japanese and the allied squadrons spotted each other. Karel Doorman realised that the Dutch fleet was outnumbered but nonetheless proceeded to attack. His actions lost the fleet and he ultimately went down with his ship. The guns of the two Japanese cruisers had a greater range than the Allied guns and at about 5pm the British cruiser HMS Exeter was hit. Twenty minutes, later the Dutch destroyer HNLMS Kortenaer was torpedoed exploding and breaking into two. Confusion arose in the Allied squadron over the way forward, compounded because HMS Exeter could only sail at half power and wanted to return to port at Soerabaja (now Surabaya).

Following instructions issued by High Command, Doorman gave the order to attack at the approach of the Japanese fleet. The tactical command was "I am attacking, follow me"; he did not signal at the beginning of the battle in the Java Sea. It is a loose translation of the signal sent by him, "All ships – follow me" to remedy the confusion. The battle on 27 February 1942 which, with interruptions, lasted for over seven hours, ended with the almost complete destruction of Doorman's squadron. The squadron commander perished aboard the flagship, which sank after around 90 minutes.

== Memorials ==
Four ships in the Royal Netherlands Navy were named after him: the escort carrier Karel Doorman (QH1), the aircraft carrier Karel Doorman (R81), the frigate Karel Doorman (F827), and the multi-role support vessel Karel Doorman (A833).

Additionally in Rotterdam there is the Karel Doormanstraat (Rotterdam) named after him.

The Kloosterkerk in The Hague has a memorial plaque. Commemorations of the Battle of the Java Sea are regularly held.

== Honors and awards ==
- Knight 3rd class of the Military William Order, posthumously entered into the register on 5 June 1942
- Knight of the Order of the Netherlands Lion, 21 August 1941.
- Officer of the Order of Orange-Nassau (previously appointed a Knight)
- War Memorial Cross with two bars
- Distinguishing for Long Service as an officer, with figures XXX
- Mobilization Cross 1914–1918
- Virtuti Militari, Silver Cross (Poland)
