= Royal Canadian =

Royal Canadian may refer to:

== Military ==
- Lord Strathcona's Horse (Royal Canadians), a regiment of the Canadian army
- Royal Canadian Regiment (RCR), an infantry regiment of the Canadian army
- Royal Canadian Dragoons (RCD), an armoured regiment of the Canadian army
- Royal Canadian Engineers (RCE), a corps of the Canadian army

== Other uses ==
- The Royal Canadians, a big band formed by Guy Lombardo
- Royal Canadian Institute (RCI, RCIS), an institute for the advancement of science
- Royal Canadian Academy of Arts (RCA, RCAA)
- Royal Canadian Bank, a defunct bank
- Royal Canadian Small Batch Canadian Whiskey, from Sazerac, see List of whisky brands

== See also ==
- Canadian royalty
- Monarchy of Canada
- Canadian royal symbols
- Canadian peers and baronets
- Monarchist League of Canada (Canadian royalists)
- Royal Canadian College (disambiguation)
- Canadian (disambiguation)
- Royal (disambiguation)
