= Royal Australian and New Zealand College =

Royal Australian and New Zealand College may refer to:

- Royal Australian and New Zealand College of Obstetricians and Gynaecologists
- Royal Australian and New Zealand College of Ophthalmologists
- Royal Australian and New Zealand College of Psychiatrists
- Royal Australian and New Zealand College of Radiologists

== See also ==
- Royal Australian College (disambiguation)
- Royal New Zealand College (disambiguation)
- Royal College (disambiguation)
