= Royal Naval College =

Royal Naval College may refer to:

- Royal Naval Academy in Portsmouth (1733–1837), renamed the Royal Naval College in 1806
- Royal Naval College, Greenwich (1873–1998)
- Royal Naval College, Osborne (1903–1921)
- Royal Naval College, Dartmouth (1905–present), renamed Britannia Royal Naval College in 1953

== See also ==
- Royal Naval College of Canada (1911–1922)
- Royal Australian Naval College (1911–present)
- Royal Canadian Naval College (1942–1947)
- Royal New Zealand Naval College (1963–present)
- Royal Naval Engineering College
- Royal Naval College (Netherlands)
