= Royal Australian College (disambiguation) =

A medical royal college is a professional body in the form of a royal college responsible for the development of and training in one or more medical specialities.

Royal Australian College may also refer to:

- Royal Australian Air Force College
- Royal Australian College of Dental Surgeons
- Royal Australian College of General Practitioners

== See also ==
- Royal Australian and New Zealand College (disambiguation)
- Royal College (disambiguation)
