= Royal New Zealand College =

Royal New Zealand College may refer to:

- Royal New Zealand College of General Practitioners
- Royal New Zealand Police College
- Royal New Zealand Naval College

== See also ==
- Royal Australian and New Zealand College (disambiguation)
- Royal College (disambiguation)
