= Collège royal =

Collège royal or variation, may refer to:

- Royal colleges under French or francophone jurisdictions

== Educational ==
- Collège royal (Rabat), Morocco; educating royals
- Collège de France, Paris, France; (formerly Collège royal) a tertiary school
- Collège royal Henry-Le-Grand, La Flèche, Sarthe, France; a military lyceum and tertiary school
- Collège militaire royal de Saint-Jean, a Canadian military college

== Professional bodies ==
- Collège royal des chirurgiens dentistes du Canada (Canadian Royal College of Dental Surgeons), a professional body

== Other uses ==
- College Royal, an annual event at the Ontario Agricultural College
- College Royal, an annual event at the University of Guelph

== See also ==
- Royal (disambiguation)
- College (disambiguation)
- Royal College (disambiguation)
