= Royal Canadian College =

Royal Canadian College may refer to:

- Royal Canadian College of Organists
- Royal Canadian Naval College

== See also ==
- Royal Military College of Canada (Kingston)
- Royal Military College Saint-Jean
- Canadian Military Colleges
- Royal Canadian (disambiguation)
- Royal College (disambiguation)
