= HNLMS De Ruyter (1935) =

Dutch light cruiser (1935–1942)

Coordinates: 5°58′55″S 112°3′57″E

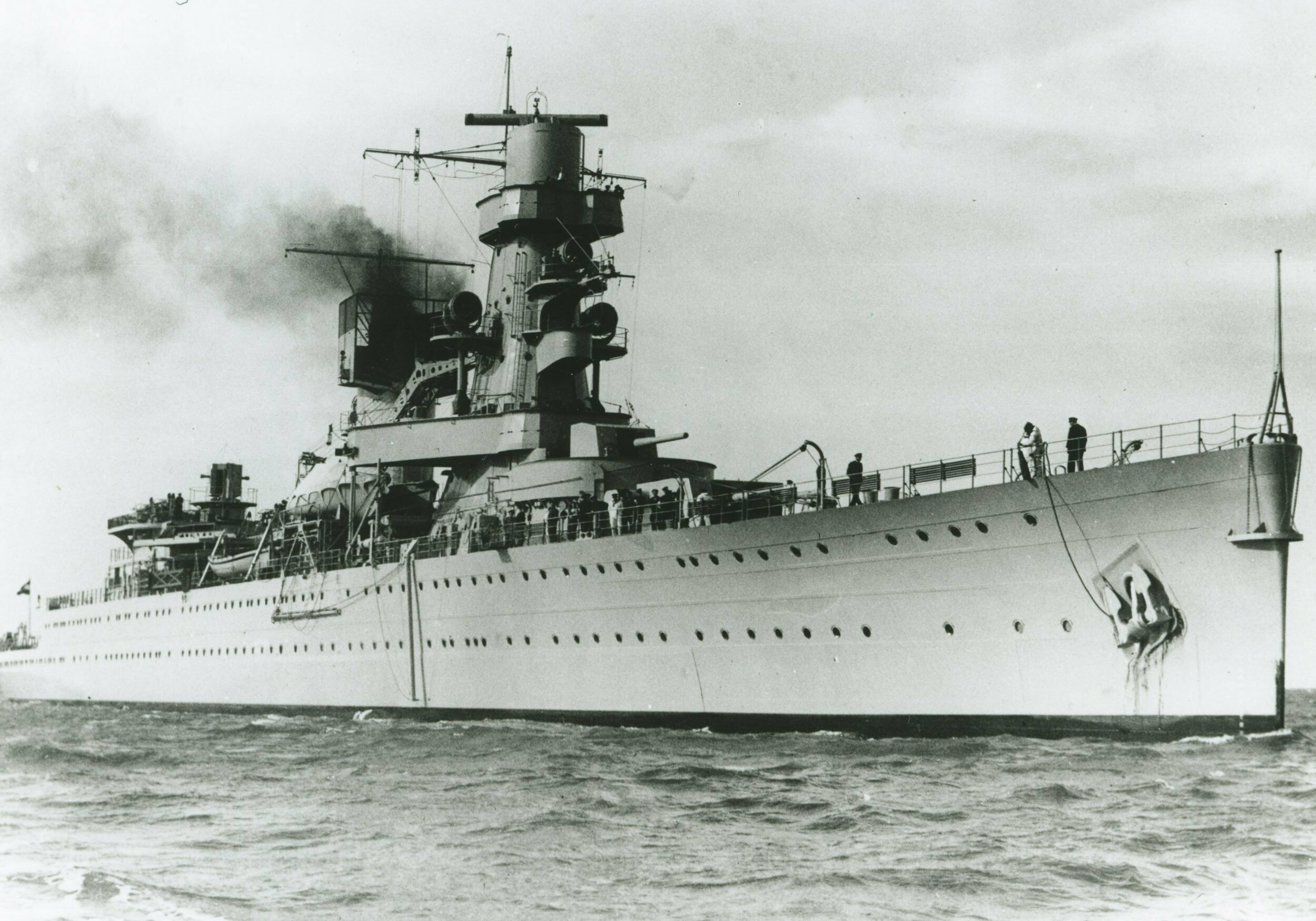
- HNLMS De Ruyter

Class overview
- Builders: Wilton-Fijenoord
- Preceded by: Java class
- Succeeded by: De Zeven Provinciën class
- Planned: 1
- Completed: 1
- Lost: 1

History

Netherlands
- Name: De Ruyter
- Namesake: Michiel de Ruyter
- Ordered: 1 August 1932
- Laid down: 16 September 1933
- Launched: 11 May 1936
- Completed: 3 October 1936
- Commissioned: 3 October 1936
- Fate: Torpedoed, Battle of Java Sea

General characteristics
- Type: Light cruiser
- Displacement: 7,822 long tons (7,948 t)
- Length: 170.8 m (560 ft 4 in)
- Beam: 15.6 m (51 ft 2 in)
- Draft: 4.9 m (16 ft 1 in)
- Installed power: 68,000 shaft horsepower (51,000 kilowatts) normal; 77,000 shaft horsepower (57,000 kilowatts) overload
- Propulsion: 6 × boilers; 3 × steam turbines; 2 × shafts
- Speed: 32–33 kn (59–61 km/h; 37–38 mph) normal load in deep ocean; 33.5 kn (62.0 km/h; 38.6 mph) maximum under normal load in deep ocean
- Range: 6,800 nmi (12,600 km; 7,800 mi) at 12 kn (22 km/h; 14 mph)
- Complement: 435
- Armament: 7 × 150 mm (5.9 in) guns; 10 × 40 mm (1.57 in) Bofors anti-aircraft guns; 8 × 12.7 mm (0.5 in) machine guns
- Armor: Belt: 30–50 mm (1–2 in); Turrets: 30–50 mm; Deck: 33 mm (1 in); Conning tower: 30 mm
- Aircraft carried: 2 × Fokker C-11W floatplanes
- Aviation facilities: 1 × catapult

HNLMS De Ruyter was a unique light cruiser of the Royal Netherlands Navy. Intended to reinforce the older Java-class cruisers in the Dutch East Indies, her design and construction were limited by the Great Depression. Laid down in 1933 and commissioned in 1936, she spent the first part of her career patrolling nearby waters prior to the Dutch declaration of war on Japan. During the Dutch East Indies campaign, she became the flagship of the American-British-Dutch-Australian Command Combined Strike Fleet. For the first several months of war, she led Allied warships in unsuccessful attempts to intercept Japanese invasions and withstood multiple air attacks. During the Battle of the Java Sea, the cruiser was ambushed by a night-time torpedo attack by Haguro and sunk with most of her crew. Her wreck was later illegally salvaged for metal in the 2010s, which destroyed most of the ship.

== Development ==
During the Interwar period, the Dutch Navy was split between defending the Netherlands and the Dutch East Indies, particularly the island of Java. While the European fleet focused around minelaying, the flotilla in Asia relied on a combination of aircraft, destroyers, and submarines to identify and destroy an invading force near the coastline. Cruisers were vital in this doctrine, as they had the capability to sail out to sea and attack enemy convoys outside the Indonesian archipelago and serve as powerful escorts for allied vessels.

By 1927, the Great Depression had sapped the budget and strength of the Dutch military. Recognizing the need for post-depression rebuilding, the Navy proposed the Vlootplan Deckers (Deckers Fleet Plan) in 1930 to expand the East Indies fleet to a satisfactory size. The plan called for a force of three cruisers. While two Java-class cruisers were already in service, regular maintenance meant both could not always be available for combat. To ensure two cruisers could be operational simultaneously, the plan called for the construction of a new cruiser to join the Java class in the East Indies. Three Java-class cruisers were initially planned, however the third, Celebes–intended as the flagship for the East Indies Fleet–was cancelled in 1919, which required a replacement.

=== Budgetary constraints ===
The Dutch economy was recovering when design work on the new cruiser began, which limited how much the Tweede Kamer was willing to budget. The ship's design was based on the earlier Java class and replicated many of its features, including similar armor protection, range, and the caliber of the main guns. However, budgetary constraints required a lighter hull than the Javas, restricting the main battery to just three twin 15 cm (5.9 in) turrets. This reduction in firepower drew considerable criticism. Some advocated for a fourth turret, the addition of torpedo tubes, or argued the funds would be better spent on aircraft or submarines.

Further objections emerged through a Navy-sponsored essay contest, in which several winning entries proposed building a treaty cruiser armed with 20 cm (8 in) guns and displacing 8,500 long tons (8,636 t). However, the proposal was rejected in 1930, as it would have nearly doubled the projected cost. Some of the criticisms were addressed through political maneuvering; by classifying the ship as a flottieljeleider (flotilla leader), the Navy justified a modest increase in displacement, which allowed for the addition of a single 15 cm gun mounted forward of the bridge.

== Design ==
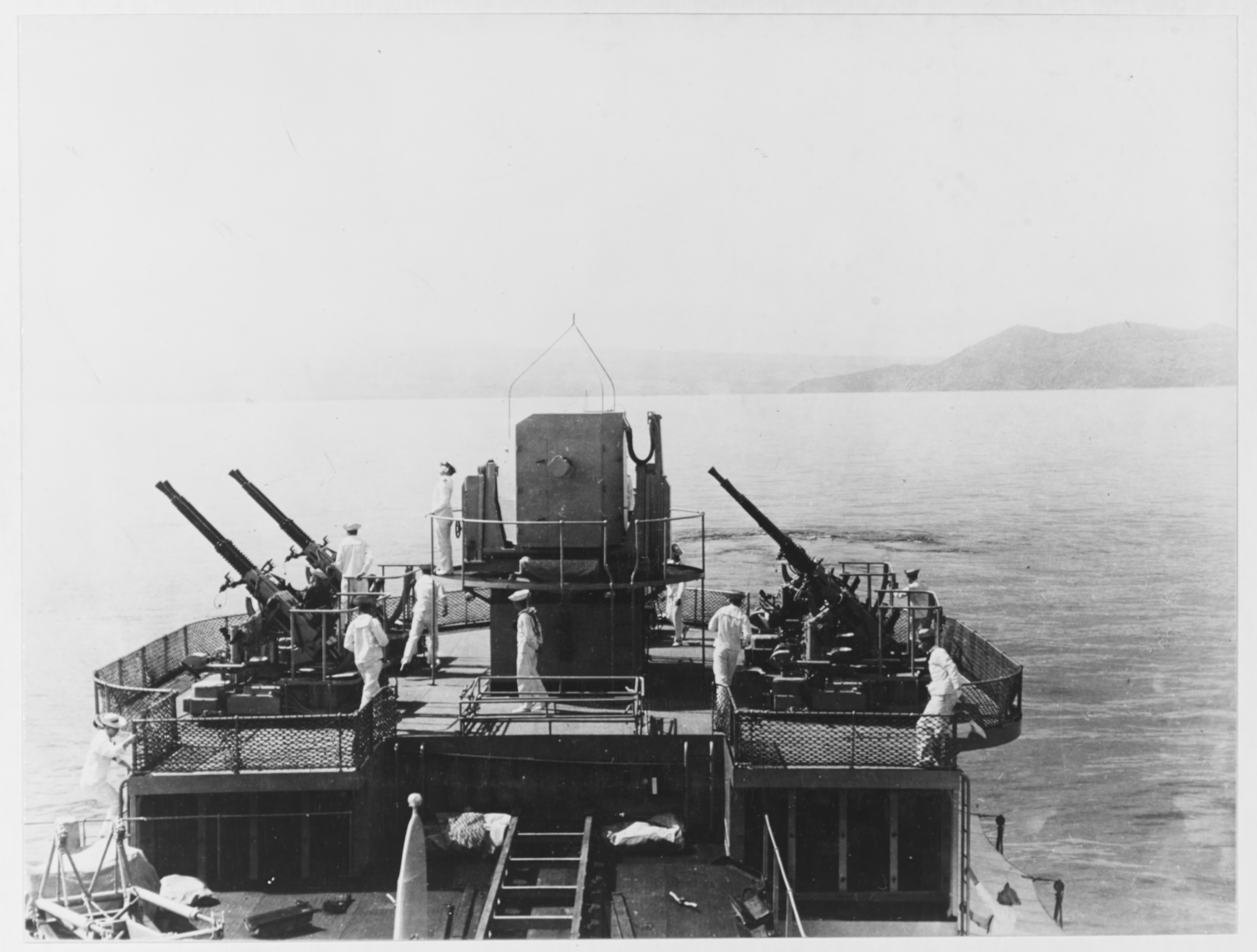
De Ruyter's antiaircraft platform consisted of five twin Bofors L/60 guns and the guns' fire control computer.

Her final design displaced 7,822 long tons (7,948 t) and measured 170.8 m (560 ft 4 in) in length, with a beam of 15.6 m (51 ft 2 in) and a draft of 4.9 m (16 ft 1 in). Her main armament consisted of three 15 cm (5.9 in) Wilton-Fijenoord Mk 9 twin turrets – two mounted aft and one forward - along with the aforementioned single 15 cm Mk 10 turret. For antiaircraft defense, she was equipped with five twin 40 mm (1.6 in) Bofors L/60 guns mounted on a platform at the stern. She was the first vessel to be outfitted with the popular L/60, and combined with her advanced antiaircraft fire control, she was a capable warship for air defense. The platform was separated from the funnel by the Navy's first catapult and an aircraft stowage area, which supported two Fokker C.XI-W floatplanes used for reconnaissance and artillery spotting. Powered by six boilers and three geared turbines, the cruiser produced 51 megawatts (68,000 shp), which drove two propellers and reached a top speed of 33.5 knots (62.0 km/h; 38.6 mph), though she would normally steam at a maximum of 33 knots (61 km/h; 38 mph). Her armor was light, consisting of an armored belt and turret protection between 30 and 50 mm (1 and 2 in) thick along with 30 mm (1 in) around the conning tower and a 33 mm (1 in) thick deck.

Her designer was N.V. Ingenieurskantoor voor Scheepsbouw (IsV), a clandestine front for several German naval companies used for Nazi rearmament and illegal submarine development. As a result, the ship reflected a strong German influence, seen in features such as the tall, bulky bridge tower, a single large funnel, and a straight bow shared with Germany's Deutschland-class cruisers and other characteristics paralleled those of the Königsberg-class light cruisers. The reliance on German experience constrained the design, as the German warships were limited by the Treaty of Versailles, thereby indirectly applying the treaty's limitations to the Dutch ship.

Due to this German influence and tight fiscal limitations, the cruiser has drawn criticism from both contemporary and modern analysts. Compared to other light cruisers built during the same decade, she lacked in armament, armor, and torpedo tubes. Her antiaircraft weapons, while formidable, were grouped together on the aft platform, which prevented them from firing forward and provided an opportunity for one hit to destroy them all. In addition, she was designed to serve as a flagship, yet lacked a flagship bridge. Her use of two propellers, instead of four, which was the norm, meant she had no redundancies in case the rudder or propeller were damaged; if this did occur, she would have been left uncontrollable. The design flaws were addressed in the Eendracht-class cruisers laid down starting in 1939, which were intended to replace the Java class. With the new cruiser as a basis for the new design, the Eendracht class had a full battery of ten 15 cm (5.9 in) guns. Due to the German Invasion and consequent recapture of the Netherlands, the class entered service as the De Zeven Provinciën class.

== History ==
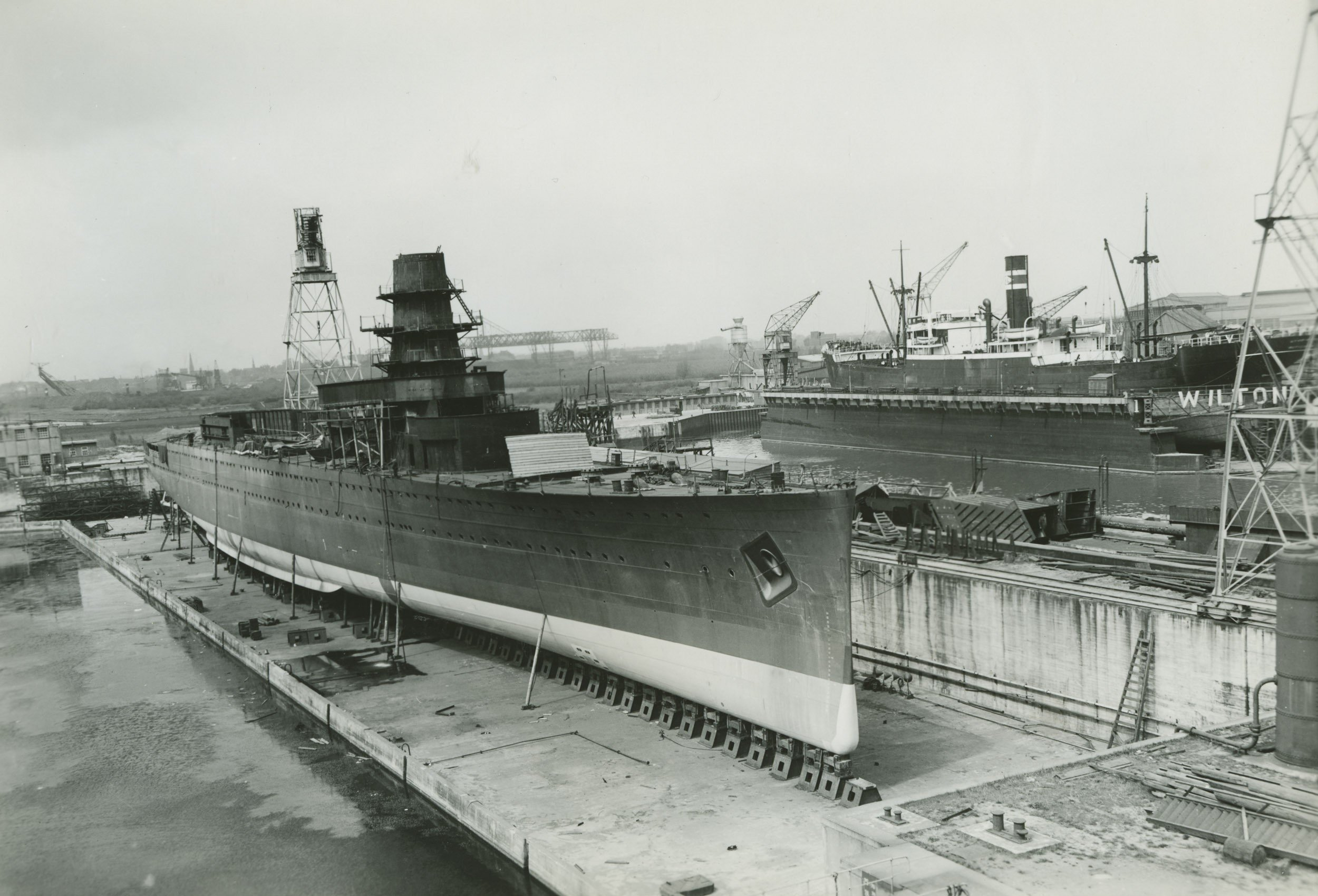
The nearly completed De Ruyter in 1935.

=== Construction ===
The cruiser was ordered on 1 August 1932, and her keel was laid on 16 September 1933 at the Wilton-Fijenoord shipyard. Despite continued financial issues, she was launched on 11 May 1936. On 3 October, she was completed and commissioned as De Ruyter, named after 17th-century admiral Michiel de Ruyter.

=== Peace time ===
For her first several months in service, De Ruyter trialed off the Netherlands before she sailed for the East Indies in January 1937. In October, she became the flagship of the Dutch East Indies squadron under the command of Admiral Karel Doorman. Over the next several years, she trained with other ships in the squadron and prepared defenses throughout the colony. Her work in Asia was uninterrupted by the invasion and capitulation of the Netherlands in 1940.

=== Dutch East Indies Campaign ===
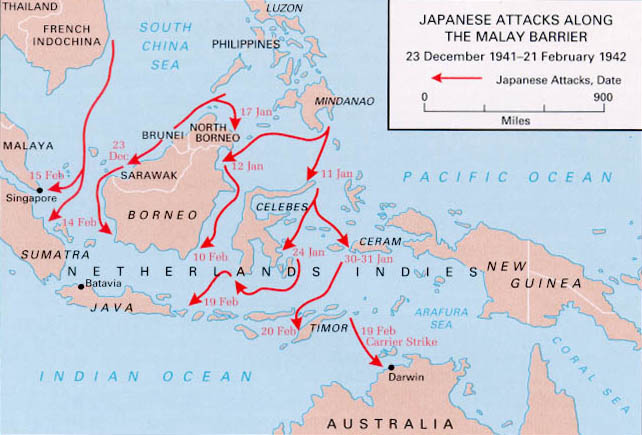
Japanese offensives throughout the East Indies: De Ruyter attempted to prevent landings in the Java Sea between Java, Sumatra, Borneo, and Celebes.

Following the bombing of Pearl Harbor and Japanese attacks on British Malaya, the Dutch government-in-exile declared war on Japan on 8 December 1941. Now in a war zone, De Ruyter patrolled nearby waters to intercept enemy merchants, contain Japanese cruisers, and escort British reinforcements to Singapore. Over the next two months, Japan's rapid advances across Southeast Asia overwhelmed the region's Allied naval forces. In an effort to coordinate resistance, elements of the Australian, British, Dutch, and American navies formed American-British-Dutch-Australian Command (ABDACOM): an ad hoc command that brought together each nation's available ships under a (nominally) unified structure. One of ABDACOM's first steps was the formation of an offensive fleet – the Combined Striking Force – that composed of a mix of American and Dutch cruisers and destroyers. After some debate, command of the fleet was given to Doorman, due to Dutch jurisdiction over the region, his leadership of the Dutch squadron, and his reputation as an uncontroversial figure.

==== Battle of Makassar Strait ====
The force's first offensive action was on 4 February 1942. Doorman aimed to intercept the invasion of Makassar City and deny the Japanese control of the Makassar Strait. Without air cover, the fleet was detected by Japanese reconnaissance aircraft. While off the Kangean Islands, more than 50 Nells and Betty bomber aircraft attacked the fleet. De Ruyter was unscathed, although the American cruiser Marblehead was crippled and another cruiser, Houston, lost a turret. The air attack forced Doorman to call off the mission.

Several days later, the fleet attempted to intercept the invasion of Sumatra. A floatplane from De Ruyter found the Japanese invasion fleet, and the Allies were likewise detected. Without air support, the fleet was molested by Japanese bombers throughout Valentine's Day; in one instance, a wave of torpedo bombers attacked De Ruyter, mistaking her for a battleship. No ships in the fleet were hit, but Doorman again ordered a retreat.

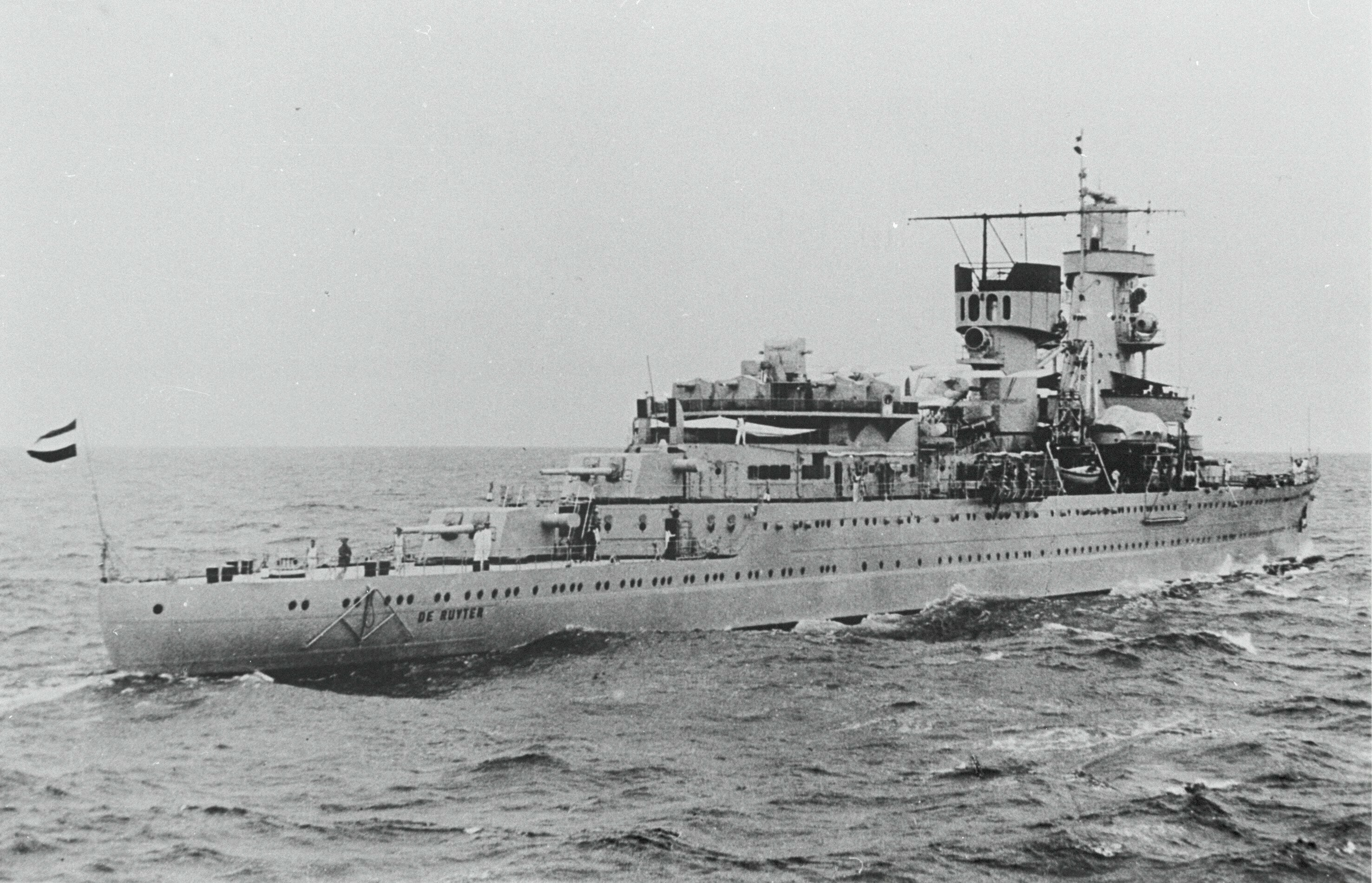
De Ruyter in 1942 as flagship of the ABDA Combined Striking Force.

==== Battle of Badung Strait ====
Japan's next target was Bali. The Allies knew the fall of Bali would directly threaten ABDACOM's bases on Java, and that an immediate response was needed. A force to counterattack was assembled, but due to time constraints, the Allies were unable to coordinate a unified strike. Instead, the operation was planned in several waves. The first wave was led by De Ruyter, along with Java and several destroyers. The plan was for the two cruisers to sail by at night and attack the invasion force's escorts and draw them away. This would leave the transports vulnerable to a follow-up attack by Allied destroyers.

On the night of 19 February, the battle began when De Ruyter found the destroyers Asashio and Ōshio escorting a transport off Bali. After catching the Japanese by surprise, De Ruyter opened fire. However, limited communication and poor visibility prevented the ships from hitting each other. After ten minutes, Doorman believed the destroyers were sufficiently damaged and took the cruisers north and hoped that he was followed. The Japanese did not take the bait. Instead, they then engaged the Allied destroyers, routing them and sinking the Dutch destroyer Piet Hein in the process.

==== Battle of the Java Sea ====
On the 26th, the Allies learned that the invasion of Java was underway. Doorman intended to use everything at his disposal to repel the assault, and was reinforced by units from the Royal Navy and Royal Australian Navy. The enlarged fleet, comprising five cruisers and nine destroyers from four nations, was led by De Ruyter as it moved to intercept the Japanese forces off Java. Contact was made in the mid-afternoon, and the two fleets engaged at long range. The distance made accurate gunnery difficult: De Ruyter's salvos all missed, though she was struck by a dud shell that caused negligible damage.

About 20 minutes into the battle, the Japanese fleet launched a large salvo of Type 93 torpedoes and hoped the Allied fleet would not expect such an attack from such an extreme range. The only hit was to the destroyer Kortenaer, which promptly sank. The gunnery duel continued: HMS Exeter was struck in her boiler room, which cut her speed to 11 knots (20 km/h; 13 mph). As Exeter turned to withdraw and avoid colliding with the ships behind her, the trailing cruisers followed suit and mistakenly believed an order had been given by De Ruyter. Doorman then desperately had his now-isolated cruiser reform the battle line and ordered several destroyers to make torpedo attacks as cover.

Once reunited with the other cruisers, he then broke off from the engagement and circled around the Japanese to intercept the transports somewhere north of him. The force was now reduced to the cruisers De Ruyter, Java, Houston, and Perth. The destroyers had either been sunk, severely damaged, tasked with escorting the crippled Exeter, or forced to break off due to lack of fuel and torpedoes.

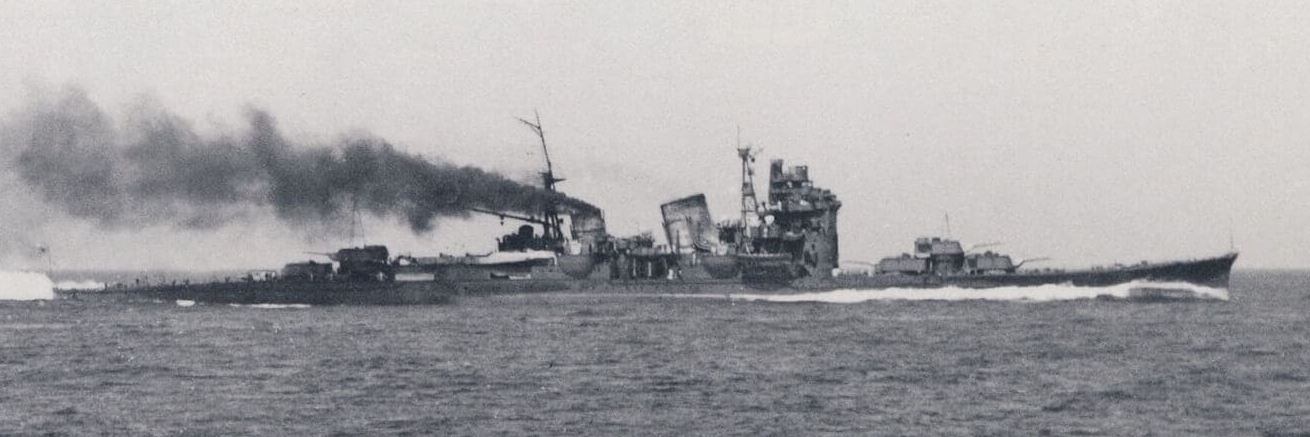
Japanese heavy cruiser Haguro depicted a year before she torpedoed and sank De Ruyter

===== Sinking =====
The cruisers were temporarily followed by Japanese floatplanes, which gave the Japanese an understanding of his route. Unaware, the Allied cruisers passed near the invasion force but were ambushed by the Japanese heavy cruisers Haguro and Nachi. Under cover of darkness, the Japanese closed to 9,000 yards (8,200 m) undetected and fired a spread of torpedoes followed by a renewed gun duel. The fleet took evasive action, but one torpedo from Nachi struck Java's magazine. The resulting explosion obliterated the old cruiser.

Doorman believed the torpedoes had all passed and resumed course, which placed De Ruyter directly in the path of another spread, this time from Haguro. A torpedo struck her stern near the reduction gears with devastating effect. Power was lost, oil spilled from a ruptured tank, and fire engulfed her aft section. As the fire spread to the antiaircraft platform, the 40 mm ammunition began to cook off, while damage-control teams struggled to respond. Without electrical power, fire hoses and pumps were inoperable, but to fight the fire, the burning dynamo generators had to be extinguished. One of the last orders from the cruiser was for the remaining two ships to flee.

The order to abandon ship was given among more secondary explosions. The wounded were prioritized and placed into the only boat that could deploy without electricity. Doorman and De Ruyter's captain, Eugène Lacomblé, were determined to go down with the ship. While their exact fate is unclear, one sailor saw the two retreat to a cabin, where they presumably killed themselves. A total of 344 crew members – roughly 80% of the ship's complement – died, many from the anti-air ammunition explosions or the floating oil fires.

== Wreck ==
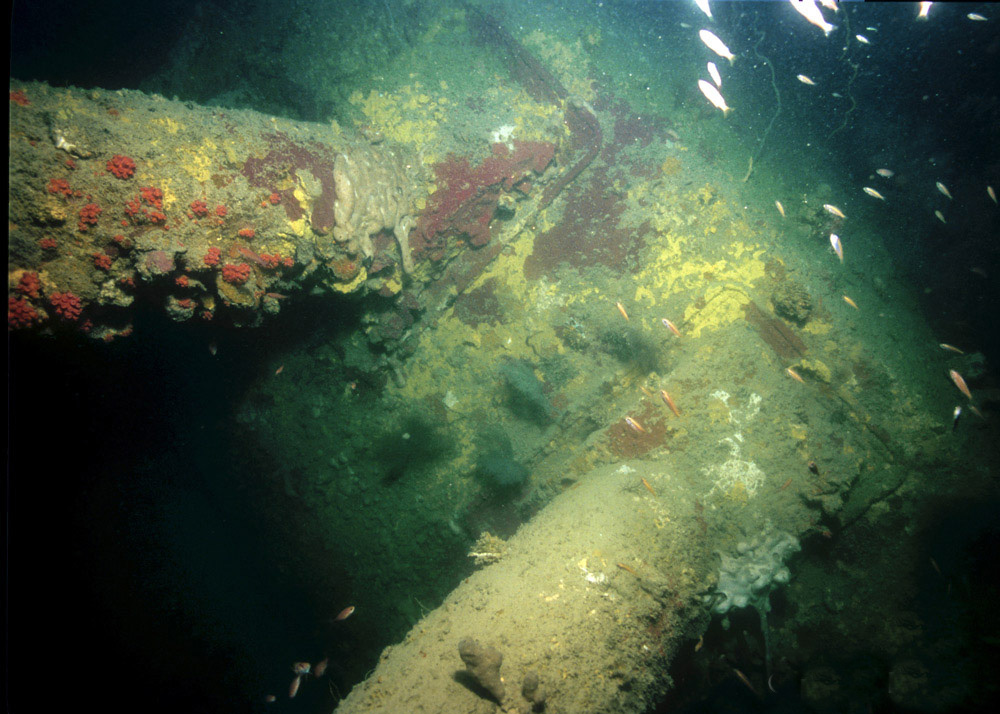
Underwater view showing one of the aft turrets on De Ruyter.

The cruiser sank upright in 69 m (226 ft) of water, and settled on her starboard side. Her wreck was discovered by a dive team in 2002, who regularly visited her and found the wrecks of other ships sunk during the last days of ABDACOM. Only during one of these expeditions was it discovered that De Ruyter's Bofors antiaircraft guns had been modified to include faceshields.

When a memorial expedition in 2016 was only able to find an imprint left in the seabed, the wreck was believed to have been intentionally dismantled. The Dutch government investigated, offended at the mass disturbance of war graves. An investigation determined the wreck's disappearance was part of a trend where shallow World War II-era shipwrecks were blown apart and salvaged by groups posing as fishermen. The vessel believed to be responsible, the Chinese dredger Chuan Hong 68, was detained by Malaysian authorities in 2024 and accused of dismantling the wrecks for either low-background steel or scrap metal. They alleged the scrapping was done regardless of the wrecks' nationality, with American, Dutch, Japanese, British, and Australian ships affected. In 2018, The Guardian reported the bones from De Ruyter and other warships were removed from their respective wrecks during scrapping in Indonesia and were dumped in several mass graves nearby. The Dutch and Indonesian governments collaborated in the investigation, exhumed suspected graves, and laid out plans to prevent further damage to the shipwrecks.

== See also ==
- List of cruisers of the Netherlands
