= Royal College Building =

Royal College Building can refer to:

- Royal College Building, Colombo, Sri Lanka is the oldest building of Royal College Colombo.
- Royal College Building, Glasgow, Scotland, UK is the oldest building of John Anderson Campus of University of Strathclyde.
- Old Royal College Building, Colombo, Sri Lanka; (1911) oldest building at the University of Colombo

== See also ==
- Royal College (disambiguation)
