= Royal Naval College (Netherlands) =

Coordinates: 52°57′44″N 4°46′30″E

Koninklijk Instituut voor de Marine Royal Naval College
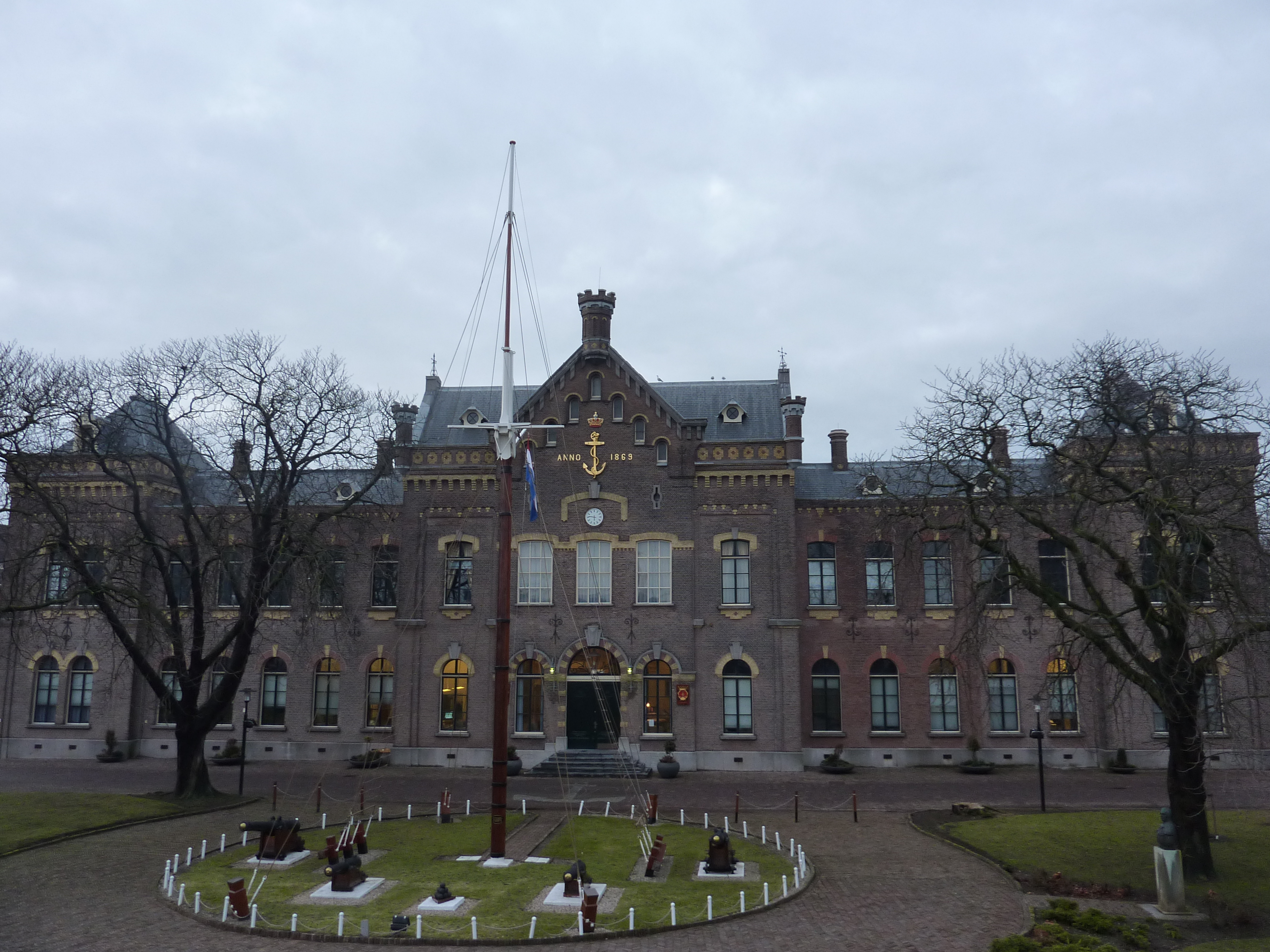
- Motto: Sumus et fore speramus
- Motto in English: We are and hope to become
- Type: National military academy
- Active: 28 August 1829–2005
- Administrative staff: 90
- Undergraduates: 150
- Location: (Netherlands) Den Helder, The Netherlands
- Campus: Naval base
- Website: www.kim.nl

The Royal Naval College was the service academy of the Royal Netherlands Navy. From 2005 it is part of the Koninklijk Instituut voor de Marine ("Royal naval institute" or KIM) as part of the Nederlandse Defensie Academie ("Netherlands defence academy") in Den Helder. It offers a program of four or five years and also a short course of 16 to 22 months. Upon the completion of the program a graduate is awarded a bachelor's degree and is commissioned in the Royal Netherlands Navy. The training of officers for the Royal Netherlands Army and Royal Netherlands Air Force is done by the Koninklijke Militaire Academie in Breda.

== History ==
The Royal Netherlands Navy was officially founded in 1815, but existed in various forms since 1488. In the early years of the Navy, officers were trained in service aboard ships. In 1785, the 'Kweekschool voor de Zeevaart' the first land-based training school for future officers, opened. This school was the predecessor of the KIM. During the time of the Batavian Republic (1795–1806), as the Dutch Navy began to become more organized, the training school was improved as well. With the forming of the Kingdom of the Netherlands on 10 January 1816, an institute for training naval officers was founded in Delft. Twelve years later, it was moved to a site near Medemblik, and many improvements were made for the move. A boarding school system was introduced, and the institute applied for officer training. On 28 August 1829, the opening of the institute was celebrated in the great church of Medemblik. That date is now observed as the anniversary of KIM's founding. In 1854, the current campus at Willemsoord in Den Helder was opened. In 2005 the academy was incorporated in the newly founded 'Nederlandse Defensie Academy' (NLDA), which was followed by the arrival of a lot of army and air force cadets in technical studies, and the transfer of midshipmen that followed non-technical studies to Breda, effectively ending its role as a 'maritime' academy.

== Alumni ==
- Piet de Jong '34, former Prime Minister of The Netherlands (1967–1971)
- Eugène Lacomblé '17, posthumous recipient of the Military William Order
- Hans Larive, escapee from Colditz, recipient of the Military William Order

== Ranks ==
NATO code	OF(D)	Student officer
NATO code	OF(D)	OR-5	OR-4	OR-3	OR-1
	5th year	4th year	3rd year	2nd year	1st year
Royal Netherlands Navy & Netherlands Marine Corps
Royal Netherlands Navy & Netherlands Marine Corps		Sergeant-Adelborst	Korporaal-Adelborst	Adelborst 2e jaar ongegradueerd	Adelborst
