= Fokker C.XI-W =

C.XI-W
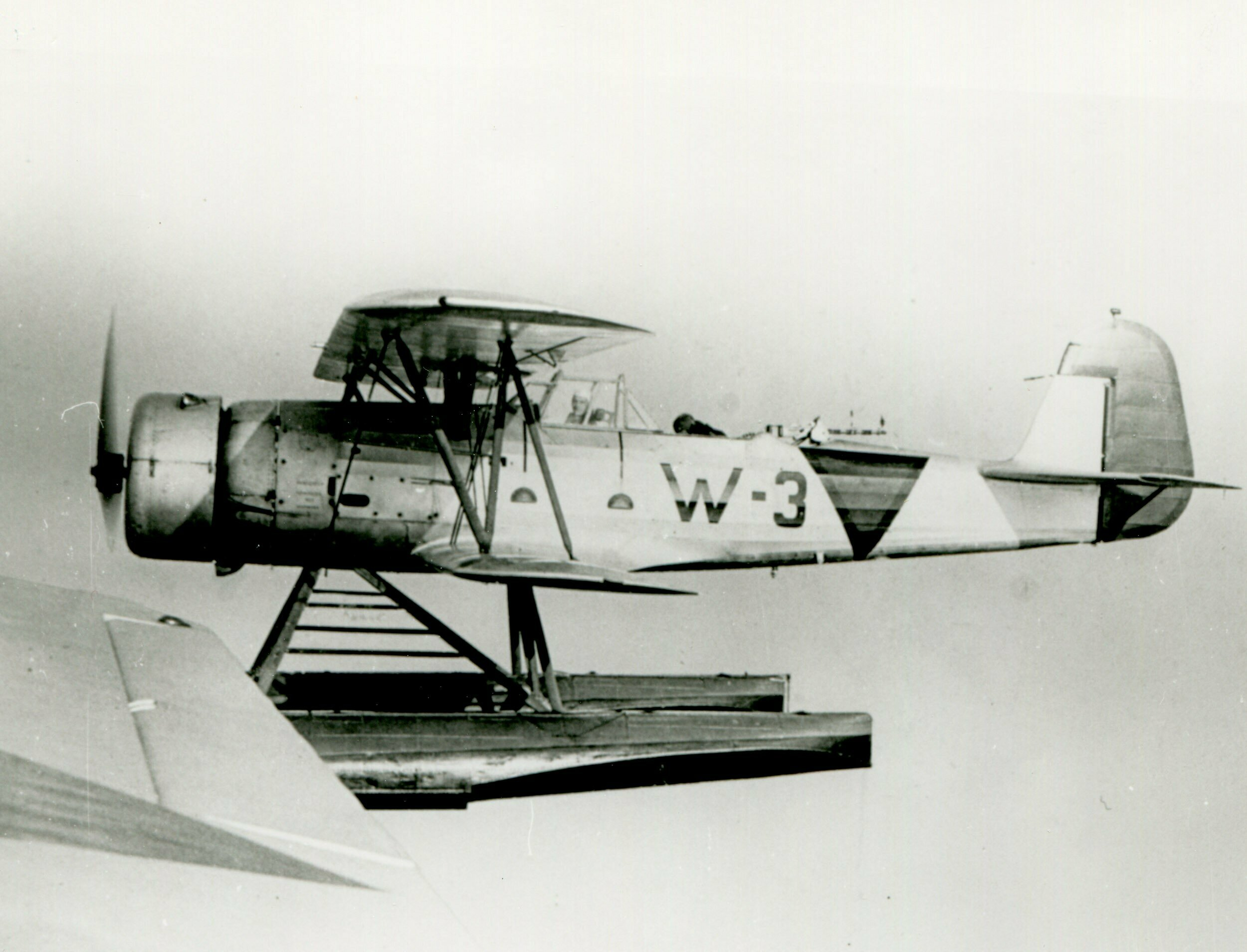

General information
- Type: Reconnaissance seaplane
- Manufacturer: Fokker
- Primary user: Royal Netherlands Navy
- Number built: 14

History
- First flight: 20 July 1935

The Fokker C.XI-W was a reconnaissance seaplane designed to operate from warships that was produced in the Netherlands in the mid-1930s. It was the result of a Royal Netherlands Navy specification of 1935 requesting such an aircraft. Fokker's response was a conventional single-bay biplane with staggered wings of unequal span braced by N-struts. The pilot and observer sat in tandem, open cockpits, and the undercarriage consisted of twin pontoons. The wings were of wooden construction with plywood and fabric covering, and the fuselage was of steel tube, also covered with fabric.

The prototype first flew on 20 July 1935. After successful catapult trials, an order for a further 13 C.XI-Ws was placed, the aircraft being used to equip the cruisers HNLMS Tromp and HNLMS De Ruyter while operating in European waters; but most were sent to the Netherlands East Indies to equip the Navy there. Following the German invasion of the Netherlands in 1940, the last surviving C.XI-W in Europe was successfully evacuated to the UK on 22 May. From there, it was also shipped to the Netherlands East Indies. None seem to have survived past March 1942.

== Specifications ==
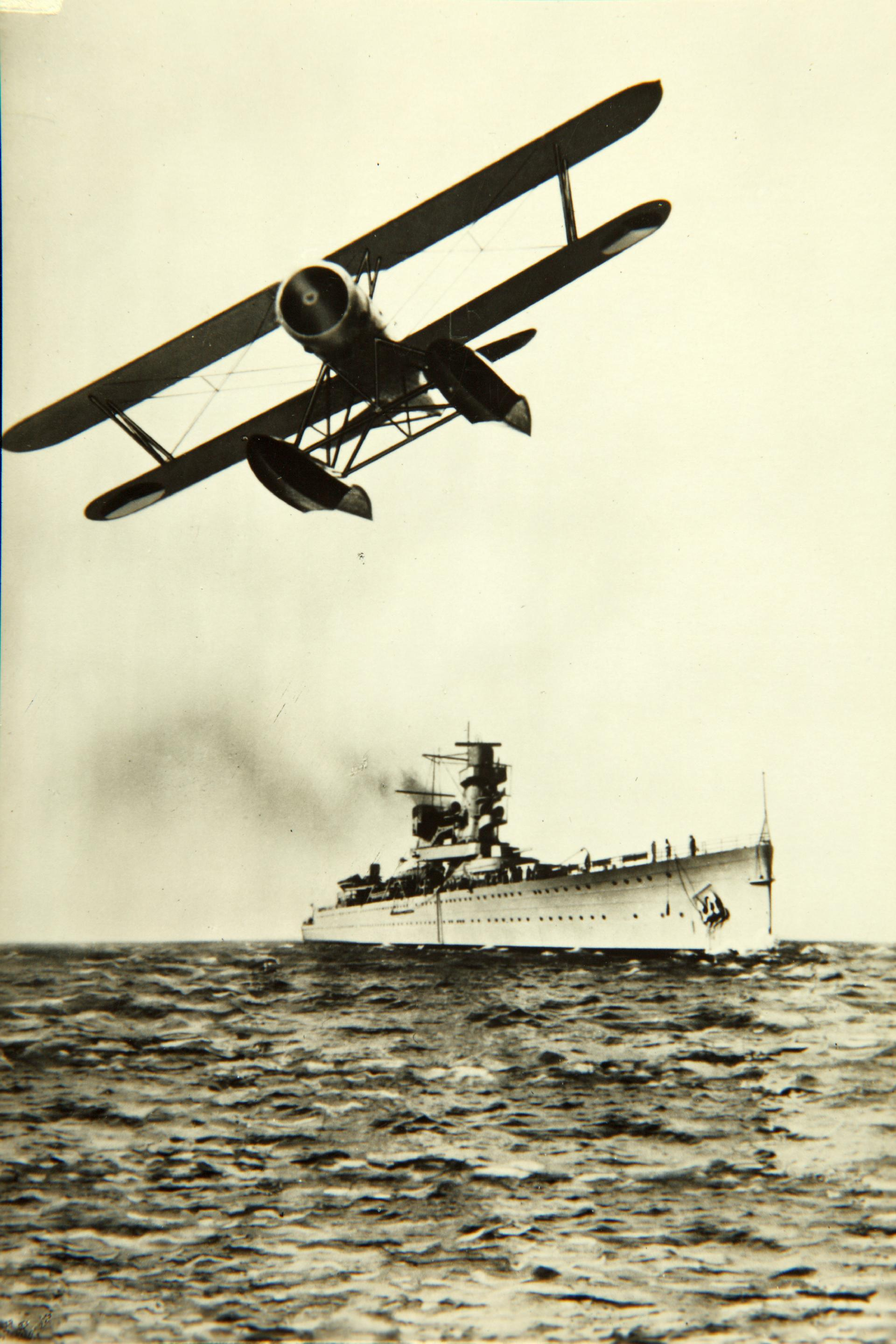
A Fokker C.XI takes off from HNLMS De Ruyter (1935)

Data from Fokker C-XIW

General characteristics

- Crew: Two, pilot and observer
- Length: 10.40 m (34 ft 1 in)
- Wingspan: 13.00 m (42 ft 8 in)
- Height: 4.50 m (14 ft 9 in)
- Wing area: 40.0 m^{2} (431 sq ft)
- Empty weight: 1,720 kg (3,792 lb)
- Gross weight: 2,550 kg (5,622 lb)
- Powerplant: 1 × Wright R-1820-F25 , 578 kW (775 hp)

Performance

- Maximum speed: 280 km/h (170 mph, 150 kn)
- Cruise speed: 240 km/h (150 mph, 130 kn)
- Range: 670 km (420 mi, 360 nmi)
- Service ceiling: 6,400 m (21,000 ft) (Absolute ceiling 6,800 m (22,300 ft)
- Time to altitude: 2.4 min to 1,000 m (3,300 ft)

Armament

- 1 × fixed, forward-firing 7.9 mm (.31 in) FN-Browning machine gun in forward fuselage
- 1 × trainable, rearward-firing 7.9 mm (.31 in) FN-Browning machine gun in observer's cockpit

== See also ==
Related lists

- List of aircraft of World War II

== Bibliography ==
- Green, William (1962). Warplanes of the Second World War: Volume Six, Floatplanes. London: Macdonald.
- Hazewinkel, Harm J. (October 1979). "Fokker C-XIW". Le fanatique de l'Aviation (in French). No. 119. pp. 26–31.
- Ledet, Michel (October 1993). "Le Fokker C-XI W (2ème partie)" [The Fokker C-XI W, Part 2]. Avions: Toute l'aéronautique et son histoire (in French) (8): 2–9. ISSN 1243-8650.
- Taylor, Michael J. H. (1989). Jane's Encyclopedia of Aviation. London: Studio Editions. p. 404.
- World Aircraft Information Files. London: Bright Star Publishing. pp. File 894 Sheet 34.
