= Royal Air Force College (disambiguation) =

Royal Air Force College may refer to:

- Royal Air Force College in Cranwell
- Royal Air Force Staff College, Andover
- Royal Air Force Staff College, Bracknell

== See also ==
- Royal Australian Air Force College
