= HNLMS Java (1921) =

Dutch Java-class light cruiser

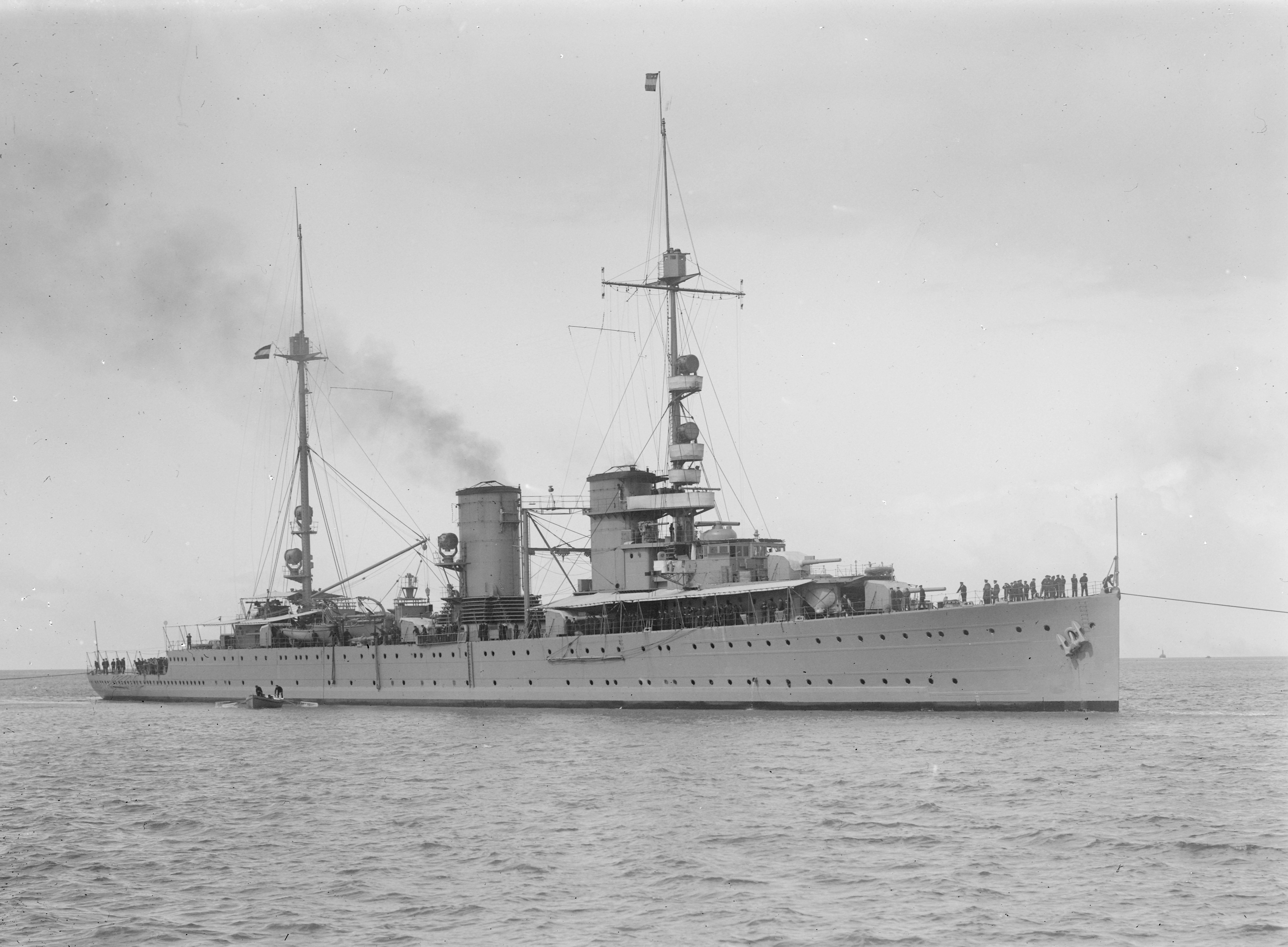
- Java in her original configuration c. 1925

History

Netherlands
- Name: Java
- Builder: Koninklijke Maatschappij de Schelde
- Laid down: 31 May 1916
- Launched: 6 August 1921
- Completed: 1 May 1925
- Fate: Torpedoed February 26, 1942, Battle of Java Sea 6°00′01″S 112°05′00″E

General characteristics
- Type: Java-class cruiser
- Displacement: 6670 tons standard; 8339 tons full load
- Length: 155.3 m (509 ft 6 in) overall; 153 m (502 ft 0 in) waterline
- Beam: 16 m (52 ft 6 in)
- Draught: 6.22 m (20 ft 5 in)
- Propulsion: 73,000 shp (54 MW), three shafts
- Speed: 31 knots
- Range: 3,600 nmi (6,700 km; 4,100 mi) at 12 kn (22 km/h; 14 mph)
- Complement: 525
- Armament: 10 × 15 cm guns; 4 × 7.5 cm (3.0 in) AA (removed 1935); 8 × 40 mm AA (added 1935); 4 × 12.7 mm (0.50 in) machine guns (added 1935); 36 × mines
- Armour: 7.5 cm (3.0 in) belt; 2.5 to 5 cm (2.0 in) deck; 12.5 cm (4.9 in) conning tower; 10 cm (3.9 in) shields
- Aircraft carried: 2 × floatplanes

HNLMS Java was the lead ship of the Java-class light cruisers operated by the Royal Netherlands Navy. She was designed to defend the Dutch East Indies and outperform all potential rivals. She was laid down in 1916, but a series of construction delays prevented her from being completed until 1925. By the time she entered service, her design was already dated. Over the next several years, she operated in the Indonesian archipelago and protected merchant ships during the Spanish Civil War.

During World War II, Java joined allied forces as part of the American-British-Dutch-Australian Striking Force, participated in several failed attempts to intercept Japanese invasions of the East Indies, and fended off several air attacks. During the Battle of the Java Sea, she was ambushed by the cruiser Nachi. A torpedo struck her magazine; the resulting explosion ripped the ship apart and she promptly sank with most of her crew. Her wreck was later illegally salvaged for metal in the 2010s, which destroyed most of the ship.

== Design ==
=== Development ===
During the early 20th century, the primary purpose of the Dutch Navy was the protection of the economically vital Dutch East Indies. In 1914, the Navy planned for a large expansion of its fleets, concerned about Japanese naval expansion and the need to maintain Dutch neutrality during World War I. One major aspect of the plan was the Java-class cruiser, intended to outperform all comparable cruisers, especially those of Japan. The new Japanese Chikuma-class scout cruiser—with 5,000 long tons (5,080 t) displacement, eight 15 cm (5.9 in) guns and a top speed of 26 knots (48 km/h; 30 mph)—was used as a template for what the new design needed to surpass.

=== Design ===
When Java and her class was designed in 1915, the Navy believed they were the most powerful and modern cruisers in the world. She had ten 15 cm (5.9 in) guns: two on the bow, two stern, and three guns on either side. The rest of her armament consisted of four 7.5 cm (3.0 in) anti-aircraft guns and 36 mines. She had a length of 155.3 m (510 ft), beam of 16 m (52 ft), draft of 5.5 m (18 ft), and a displacement of 8,278 long tons (8,411 t). Her top speed of 30 knots was achieved by three turbines powered by eight oil-fed boilers which provided 73,000 shp (54 MW) to three propellers. Her armor consisted of 125 mm (4.9 in) around the conning tower, 100 mm (3.9 in) gun shields, 75 mm (3.0 in) armored belt, and an armored deck between 25–50 mm (1–2 in) thick.

== Construction ==
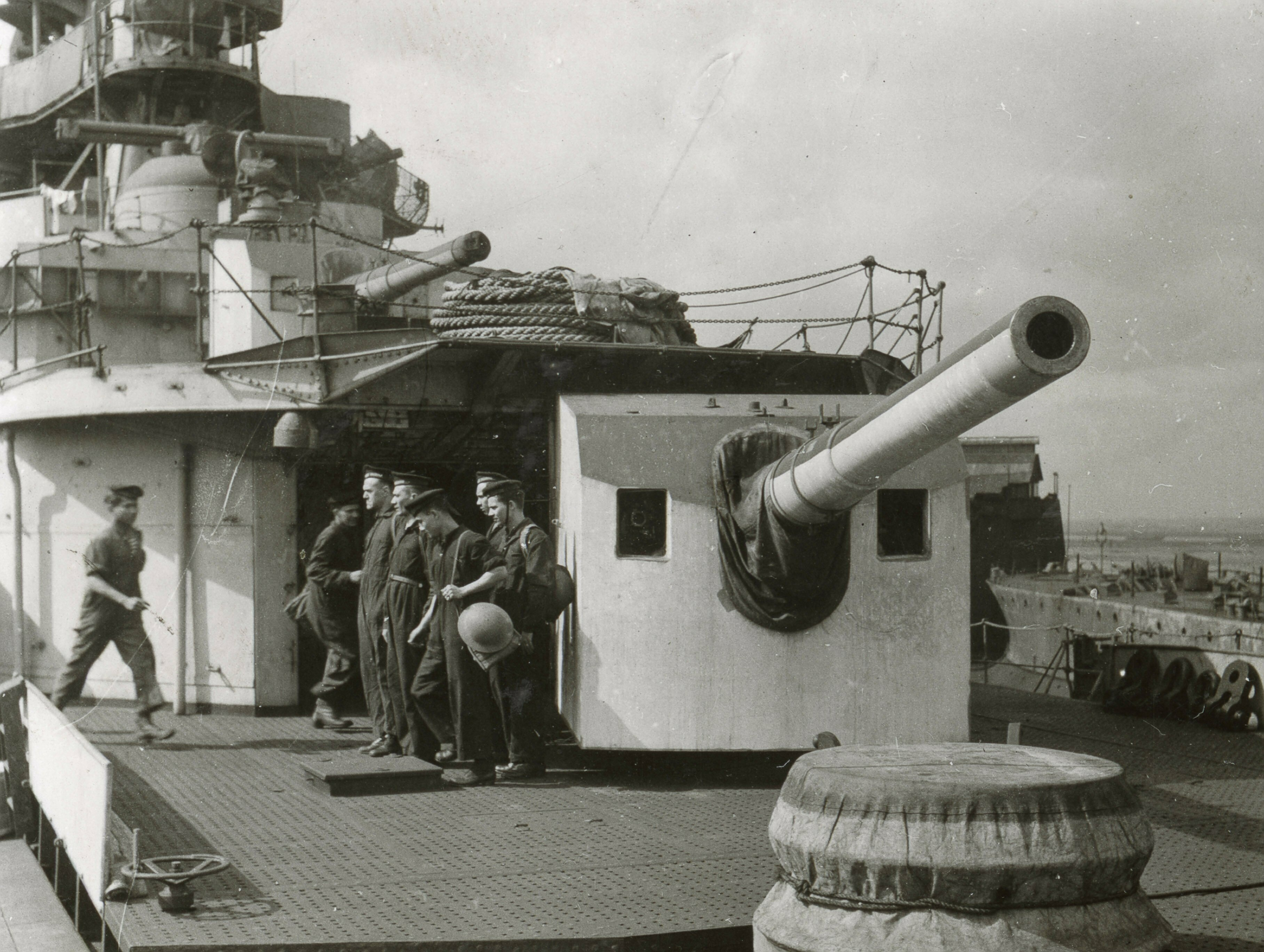
Java's single-barrel open turrets were already obsolete by the time she entered service (image from sister ship Sumatra).

Dutch naval architects had no experience with a ship such as Java, so design work and construction of various components was done by German firms such as Germaniawerft and Krupp. On 15 November 1915, she was ordered from the N.V. Koninklijke Maatschappij De Schelde shipyard in Vlissingen and laid down on 31 May 1916. The reliance on German expertise soon backfired as World War I and the Treaty of Versailles crippled the German arms industry, which led to supply shortages. In conjunction with a series of strikes and delays in building the ship's engines, construction stalled for years. Progress restarted in 1920, although the third ship of the class, Celebes, was canceled during the pause. Java was launched on 9 August 1921, and finally completed on 1 May 1925.

The significant delays of her construction saw the ship outdated by the time she entered service, primarily regarding her armament. By 1922, the Washington Naval Treaty created a new standard of cruiser equipped with 203 mm (8.0 in) guns, which Japan heavily invested in. In addition, the single-barrel turrets protected by gun shields used on Java had already been replaced by enclosed, multi-gun turrets fed by independent magazines in other navies.

== Service history ==
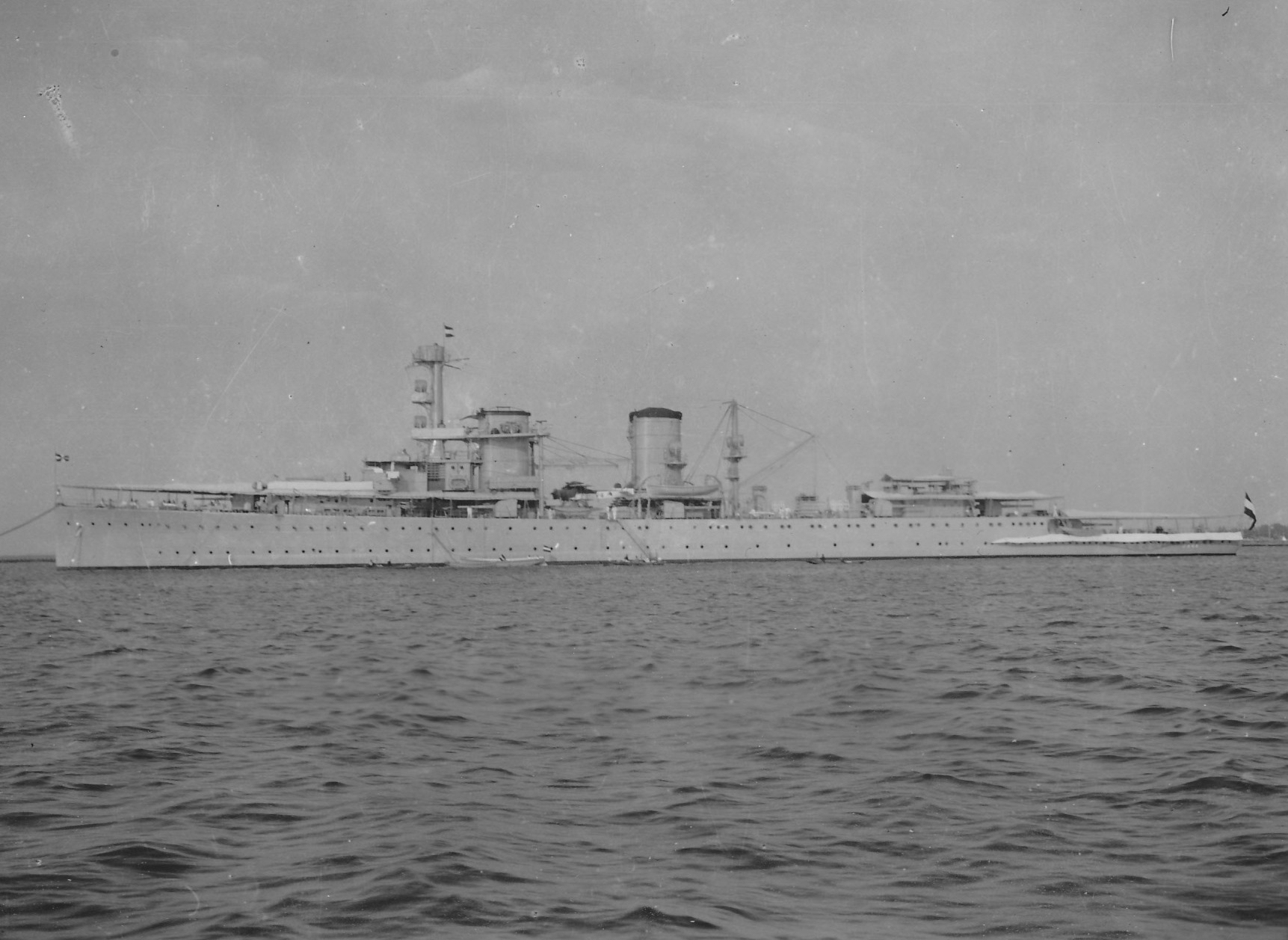
Java after her 1937 refit. Note her shorter and thicker mast.

=== Peace time ===
After she entered service, Java sailed to Sweden and Norway before she left for the Dutch East Indies. She was soon fitted with derricks to support two planes. The first aircraft she was fitted with was the Fairey IIID, although they were fragile and replaced by the Fokker C.VII-W floatplane in 1926. For the next several years, she operated in the Indonesian Archipelago and visited numerous cities throughout Asia and Oceania. In 1937, she left Asia and protected convoys traveling through the Strait of Gibraltar during the Spanish Civil War for several months in 1937. While in Europe, she participated in the 1937 Spithead Fleet Review before returning to the Netherlands for a refit. During her refit, her anti-air armament was swapped out for four twin Bofors 40 mm (1.6 in) guns, the masts were rebuilt and shortened, and four 12.7 mm (0.50 in) machine guns were added. Once work was done in January 1938, she resumed convoy escort duty in Gibraltar before she returned to the East Indies in May.

=== Dutch East Indies Campaign ===
Following the bombing of Pearl Harbor and Japanese attacks on British Malaya, the Dutch government-in-exile declared war on Japan on 8 December 1941. Now in a war zone, Java continued to escort convoys. Over the next two months, Japan's rapid advances across Southeast Asia overwhelmed the region's Allied naval forces. In an effort to coordinate resistance, elements of the Australian, British, Dutch, and American navies formed ABDACOM: an ad hoc command that brought together each nation's available ships under a (nominally) unified structure. One of ABDACOM's first steps was the formation of an offensive fleet—the Combined Striking Force—composed of a mix of American and Dutch cruisers and destroyers. After initial delay, Java was reassigned to the Striking Force that was in desperate need of ships. Command of the fleet was under Dutch Admiral Karel Doorman on his flagship De Ruyter, who was already in charge of the Dutch East Indies Fleet.

Java's first role in the Combined Striking Force was to intercept the invasion of Sumatra. A floatplane from De Ruyter found the Japanese invasion fleet, and the Allies were likewise detected. Without air support, the fleet was harassed by Japanese bombers throughout Valentine's Day. No ships in the fleet were hit. Nevertheless, Doorman ordered a retreat, concerned about the possibility of further attacks.

==== Battle of Badung Strait ====
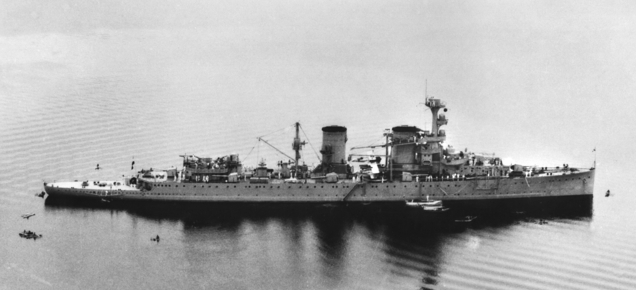
Java at anchor several weeks before she was sunk.

Japan's next target was Bali. The Allies knew the fall of Bali would directly threaten ABDACOM's bases on Java, and that an immediate response was needed. A force to counterattack was assembled, but due to time constraints, the Allies were unable to coordinate a unified strike. Instead, the operation was planned in several waves. The first wave was led by Java and De Ruyter, along with several destroyers. The plan was for the two cruisers to sail by at night and attack the invasion force's escorts and draw them away. This would leave the transports vulnerable to a follow-up attack by Allied destroyers.

On the night of 19 February, the battle began when the two cruisers found the destroyers Asashio and Ōshio escorting a transport off Bali. After catching the Japanese by surprise, the ships opened fire. However, limited communication and poor visibility prevented the ships from hitting each other. After ten minutes, Doorman believed the destroyers were sufficiently damaged and took the cruisers north, and hoped he was followed. The Japanese did not take the bait. Instead, they then engaged the Allied destroyers, routing them and sinking the Dutch destroyer Piet Hein in the process.

==== Battle of the Java Sea ====
On 26 February, the Allies learned the invasion of Java was underway. Doorman intended to use everything at his disposal to repel the assault, and was reinforced by units from the Royal Navy and Royal Australian Navy. The enlarged fleet, comprising five cruisers and nine destroyers from four nations, moved to intercept the Japanese forces off Java. Contact was made in the mid-afternoon, and the two fleets engaged at long range. The distance made accurate gunnery difficult: Java's salvos all missed and she was likewise not hit herself.

About 20 minutes into the battle, the Japanese fleet launched a large salvo of Type 93 torpedoes and hoped the Allied fleet would not expect such an attack from such an extreme range. The only hit was to the destroyer Kortenaer, which promptly sank. The gunnery duel continued: HMS Exeter was struck in her boiler room, which cut her speed to 11 knots (20 km/h; 13 mph). As Exeter turned to withdraw and avoid colliding with the ships behind her, Java and the trailing cruisers followed suit and mistakenly believed an order to do so had been given by De Ruyter. Doorman then desperately had his now-isolated cruiser reform the battle line and ordered several destroyers to make torpedo attacks as cover.

Once reunited, he then broke off from the engagement and circled around the Japanese to intercept the transports somewhere in the north. The force was now reduced to the cruisers De Ruyter, Java, Houston, and Perth. The destroyers had either been sunk, severely damaged, tasked with escorting the crippled Exeter, or forced to break off due to lack of fuel and torpedoes.

==== Sinking ====
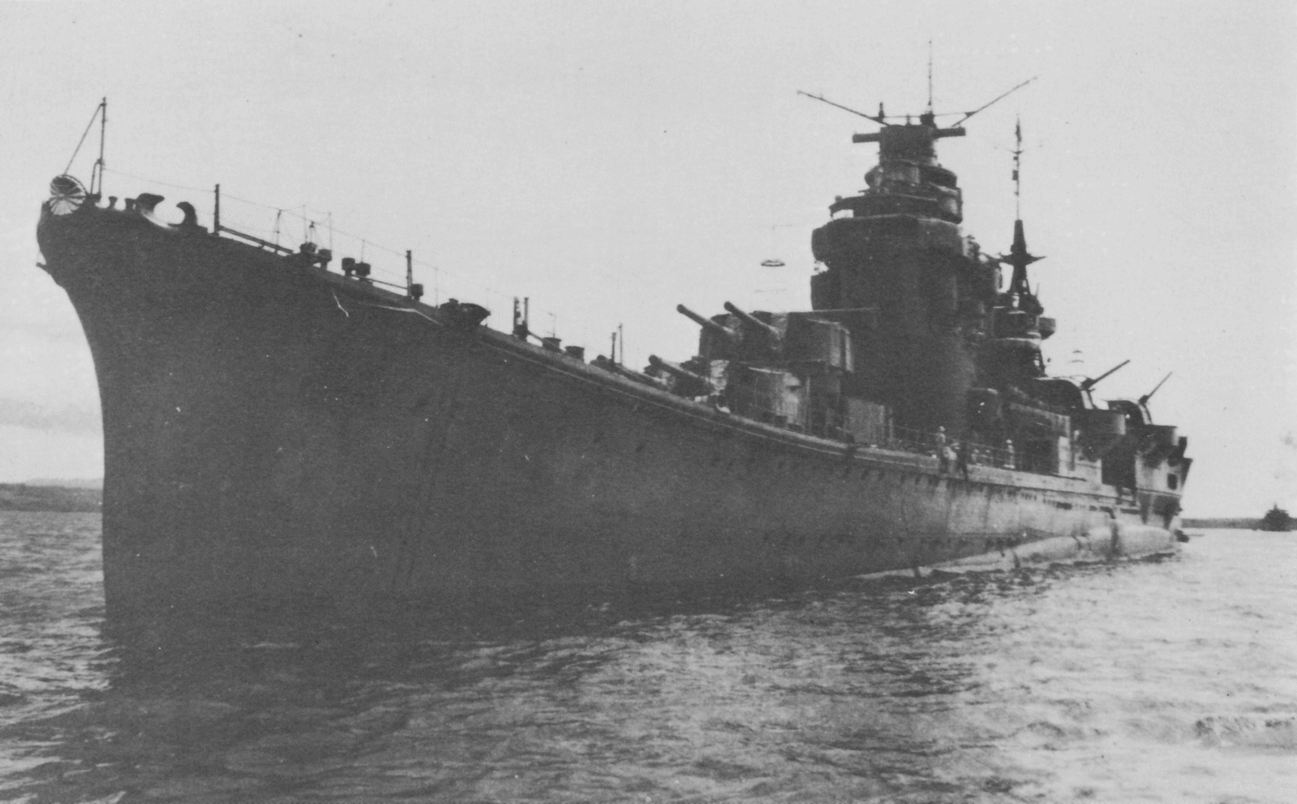
Japanese heavy cruiser Nachi days after she torpedoed Java with devastating effect.

During the night of 26 February, the cruisers were temporarily followed by Japanese floatplanes, which gave the enemy an understanding of the fleet's route. Unaware, the Allied cruisers passed near the invasion force but were ambushed by the Japanese heavy cruisers Haguro and Nachi. Under cover of darkness, the Japanese closed to 9,000 yards (8,200 m) undetected and fired a spread of torpedoes followed by a renewed gun duel. Java's crew, exhausted and low on ammunition, did not shoot back at such a long range.

When the torpedoes were detected, the fleet took evasive action. Java, at the end of the battle line, did not turn in time and was struck by a torpedo from Nachi near her magazine at 11:36 PM. The older ship, which lacked modern protections, was obliterated in the ensuing explosion. The rear-most gun and 100 feet (30 m) of her stern was blown off in an explosion so large it was felt onboard other ships in formation. Damage control was hopeless and the engine room began to flood. The order to abandon ship was given by captain Philippus van Straelen. Crews were initially calm, but they struggled to access the ship's life vests. The vests were kept locked in a compartment with one hatch, and a mob formed when sailors struggled to pass each other to reach the compartment. The ship sank in 15 minutes, which left little time to deploy lifeboats. Crew members jumped ship and clung onto anything thrown overboard. There were only 19 survivors from her complement of 525 sailors.

== Wreck ==
The cruiser sank on her starboard side and lies in 67 m (220 ft) deep water. Her wreck was discovered by an amateur diver in 2002. When an expedition in 2017 was only able to find an imprint left in the seabed, it was believed the wreck had been intentionally dismantled. The Dutch government investigated, offended at the mass disturbance of war graves. An investigation determined the wreck's disappearance was part of a trend in which shallow-water World War II-era shipwrecks were blown apart and salvaged by groups posing as fishermen. The vessel believed to be responsible, the Chinese dredger Chuan Hong 68, was detained by Malaysian authorities in 2024 and accused of dismantling the wrecks for either low-background steel or scrap metal. It was alleged that the scrapping was done regardless of the wrecks' nationality, with American, Dutch, Japanese, British, and Australian ships affected. In 2018, The Guardian reported the bones from Java and other warships were removed from their respective wrecks during scrapping in Indonesia and were dumped in several mass graves nearby. The Dutch and Indonesian governments collaborated in the investigation, exhumed suspected graves, and laid out plans to prevent further damage to the shipwrecks.
