= HNLMS Sumatra (1920) =

Java-class light cruiser

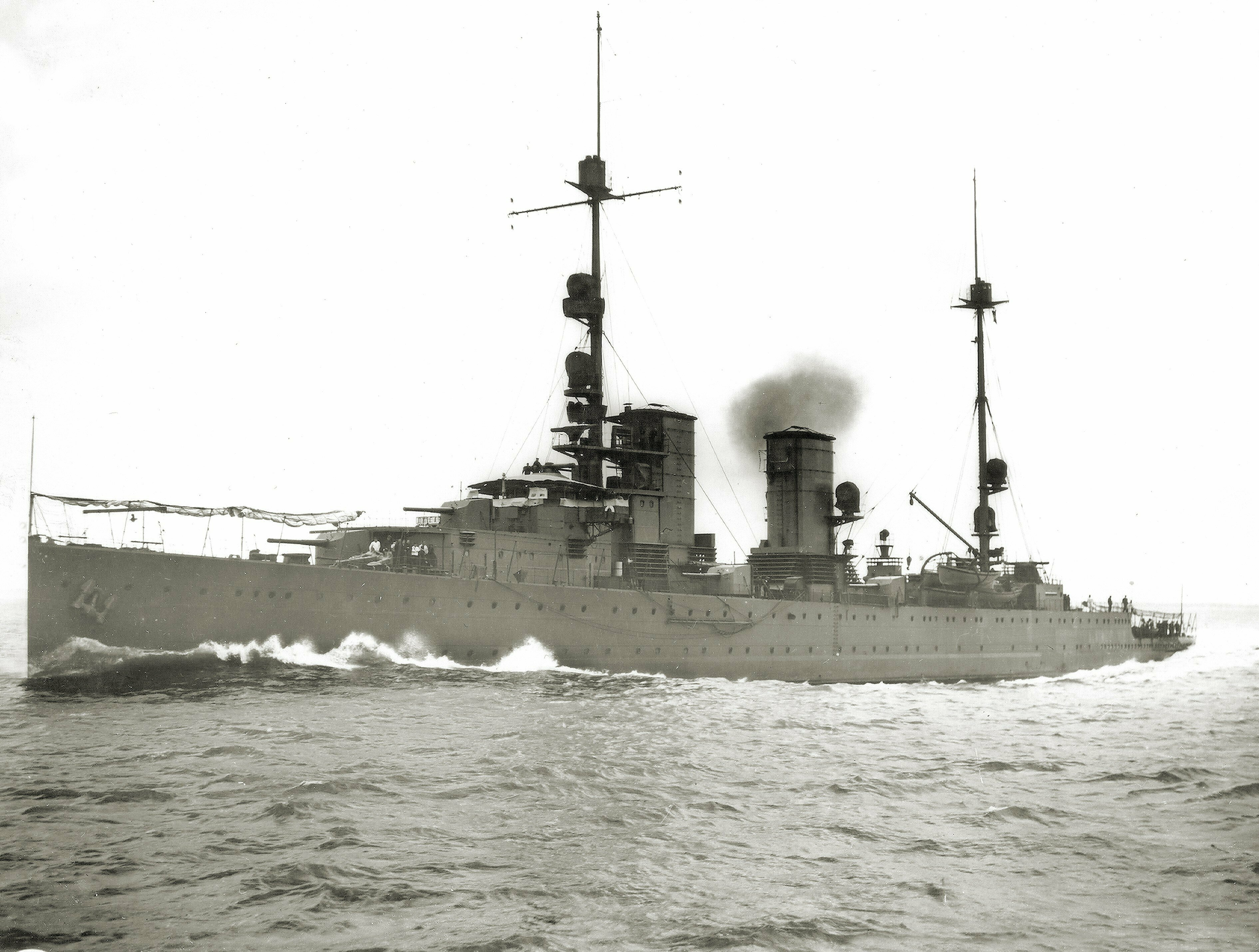
- Sumatra sometime before 1935

History

Netherlands
- Name: Sumatra
- Ordered: 15 November 1915
- Builder: Nederlandse Scheepsbouw Maatschappij
- Laid down: 15 July 1916
- Launched: 29 December 1920
- Completed: 26 May 1926
- Fate: Scuttled, 1944

General characteristics
- Type: Java-class cruiser
- Displacement: 6,670 tons standard; 8,339 tons full load
- Length: 155.3 m (509 ft 6 in)
- Beam: 16 m (52 ft 6 in)
- Draught: 6.22 m (20 ft 5 in)
- Propulsion: 82,000 shp (61,000 kW), three shafts
- Speed: 31 knots
- Range: 3,600 nmi (6,700 km; 4,100 mi) at 11 or 12 kn (22 km/h; 14 mph)
- Complement: 525
- Armament: 10 × 15 cm guns; 4 × 7.5 cm (3.0 in) AA; 4 × 12.7 mm (0.50 in) machine guns; 36 × mines
- Armour: 7.5 cm (3.0 in) belt; 2,5 to 5 cm (2.0 in) deck; 12.5 cm (4.9 in) conning tower; 10 cm (3.9 in) gun shields
- Aircraft carried: 2 × floatplanes

HNLMS Sumatra was a Java-class light cruiser operated by the Royal Netherlands Navy. She was designed to defend the Dutch East Indies and outperform all potential rivals. She was laid down in 1916, but a series of construction delays prevented her from being completed until 1926. By the time she entered service, her design was already dated. Over the next several years, she operated in the Indonesian archipelago, protected Dutch assets during the Chinese Civil War, and escorted merchant ships during the Spanish Civil War. Following the Invasion of the Netherlands in 1940, the cruiser fled to the United Kingdom and was incorporated into the Royal Navy. After a world-wide voyage to and from the East Indies, the Royal Navy had no use for the old cruiser. In 1944, she was sunk as a breakwater as part of a Mulberry harbour during the Invasion of France.

== Design ==
=== Development ===
During the early 20th century, the primary purpose of the Dutch Navy was the protection of the economically vital Dutch East Indies. In 1914, the Navy planned for a large expansion of its fleets, concerned about Japanese naval expansion and the need to maintain Dutch neutrality during World War I. One major aspect of the plan was the Java-class cruiser, intended to outperform all comparable cruisers, especially those of Japan. The new Japanese Chikuma-class scout cruiser–with 5,000 long tons (5,080 t) displacement, eight 15 cm (5.9 in) guns and a top speed of 26 knots (48 km/h; 30 mph)–was used as a template for what the new design needed to surpass.

=== Design ===
When Sumatra and her class was designed in 1915, the Navy believed they were the most powerful and modern cruisers in the world. She had ten 15 cm (5.9 in) guns: two on the bow, two stern, and three guns on either side. The rest of her armament consisted of four 7.5 cm (3.0 in) anti-aircraft guns, four 12.7 mm (0.50 in) machine guns, and 36 mines. She had a length of 155.3 m (510 ft), beam of 16 m (52 ft), draft of 5.5 m (18 ft), and a displacement of 8,278 long tons (8,411 t). Her top speed of 30 knots was achieved by three turbines powered by eight boilers which provided 82,000 shaft horsepower (61,000 kilowatts) to three propellers. Her armor consisted of 125 mm (4.9 in) around the conning tower, 100 mm (3.9 in) gun shields, 75 mm (3.0 in) armored belt, and an armored deck between 25–50 mm (1–2 in) thick.

== Construction ==
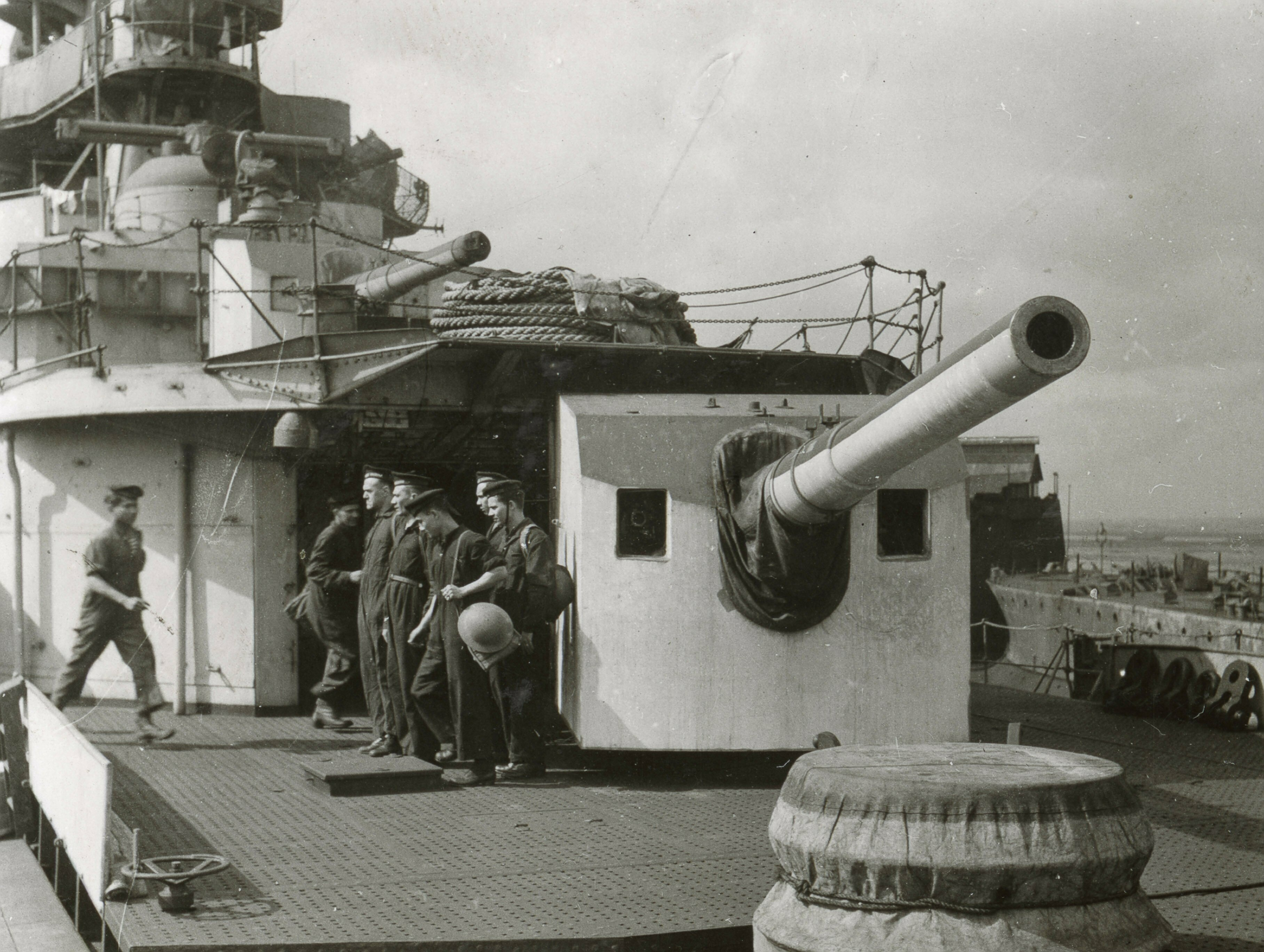
Her single-barrel open turrets were already obsolete by the time Sumatra entered service.

Dutch naval architects had no experience with a ship such as Sumatra and her sister ship Java, so design work and construction of various components was done by German firms such as Germaniawerft and Krupp. On 15 November 1915, she was ordered from the Nederlandsche Scheepsbouw-Maatschappij shipyard in Amsterdam and laid down on 15 June 1916. The reliance on German expertise soon backfired as World War I and the Treaty of Versailles crippled the German arms industry, which lead to supply shortages. In conjunction with a series of strikes and delays in building the ship's engines, construction stalled for years. Progress restarted in 1920, although it was hampered when the turbines intended for the cruiser were destroyed in a fire at the shipyard. Sumatra was launched on 29 December 1920 by Queen Wilhelmina. On 4 November 1925, Sumatra was lifted by Juliana Drydock for a final inspection and paint job. The cruiser was finally completed on 26 May 1926.

The significant delays of her construction saw the ship outdated by the time she entered service. By 1922, the Washington Naval Treaty created a new standard of cruiser equipped with 203 mm (8.0 in) guns, which Japan heavily invested in. Other elements of her design were dated at launch, such as her guns. The single-barrel open turret design used on Java had been replaced by enclosed, multi-gun turrets fed by independent magazines in other navies.

== Service history ==
=== Peace time ===
Once she was completed, Sumatra took up her station in the East Indies. She was soon fitted with derricks to support two planes. The first aircraft she was fitted with was the Fairey IIID, although they were fragile and replaced by the Fokker C.VII-W floatplane in 1926. In February 1927, the cruiser was sent to protect Dutch citizens and assets in Shanghai at the start of the Chinese Civil War. She deposited a 140-man landing party that occupied Shanghai's business quarter before she withdrew and returned to the East Indies in May.

In June 1938, Sumatra was relieved by Java in the East Indies and the cruiser sailed to the Netherlands for a refit. However, the plan was postponed when she was ordered to escort merchant ships through the Strait of Gibraltar during the Spanish Civil War. Once she arrived in the Netherlands, she was used to train sailors in the North Sea and Mediterranean before work on the refit began.

=== World War II ===
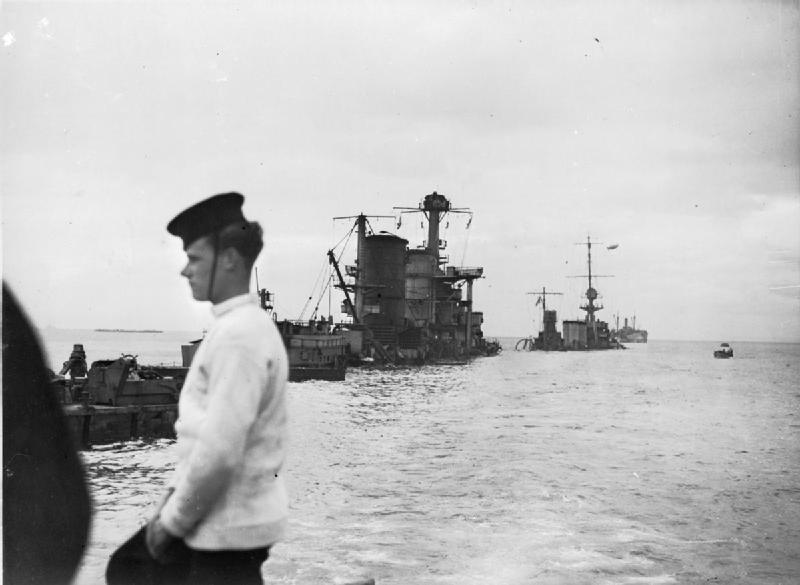
Sumatra sunk as part of a breakwater, June 9, 1944. The scuttled wreck of HMS Durban is behind her.

Sumatra was awaiting her refit in Vlissingen when the Netherlands was invaded in May 1940. Alongside most of the Dutch ships in the Netherlands, she fled to Great Britain and was placed under the command of the Royal Navy. In June, she carried Crown Princess Juliana and her two children to Canada. While in the Americas, she then sailed to Curaçao and patrolled the Caribbean and central Atlantic for enemy commerce raiders until August. That month, she sailed for the East Indies for another refit. Two years later, work on the ship was again interrupted, this time by the Japanese invasion of the East Indies.

She was reactivated on 27 January 1942 with a skeleton crew and only half of her boilers online. She fled for Sri Lanka and India, and was further refitted at each port. Work was done in August and she was able to sail to Portsmouth by October. The British did not see much value in an old cruiser such as Sumatra, and she was decommissioned so that her crew could be reassigned to other vessels. Several of her guns were later removed and installed on the gunboats Soemba and Flores, which replaced those vessels’ worn-out gun barrels. Now useless as a warship, she was scuttled off the coast of Normandy in June 1944 to form a breakwater as part of a temporary port that provided logistic support during the invasion of France.
