= Royal Police College =

Royal Police College may refer to:

- Royal Malaysian Police College Kuala Lumpur, Malaysia
- Royal New Zealand Police College, New Zealand
