= List of Dutch military equipment of World War II =

The following is a list of Dutch military equipment of World War II which includes artillery, vehicles and vessels. World War II was a global war that began in 1939 and ended in 1945. On 10 May 1940, Nazi Germany invaded the Netherlands, aiming to dominate Europe. The country was fully occupied by 17 May. By 12 March 1942, the Germans and Japanese controlled the Dutch mainland and all their major colonies. Dutch power was not restored until final Axis collapse in 1945. This list covers the equipment of armed elements centered on Royal Netherlands Army and Royal Netherlands East Indies Army, but not the Free Dutch Forces, which was equipped mainly by the Western Allies.

== Knives and bayonets ==
Model	Blade length	From:	Comments
Sabre M.1912	variable	-	officers sword
Klewang (sword)	62,5 cm	1898	officers, NCOs
Fighting knife M.17	20,5 cm	1917	front units
M.95 bayonet	24.5 cm	1896	fitted on Dutch Mannlicher rifles and carbines

== Small arms ==
=== Pistols (manual and semi-automatic) ===
Type	Base model	Maker	Rounds	Cartridge	From:	Produced	Weight	Comment
FN Model 1910#Variants	FN Model 1910	FN and Colt Firearms	7	.32 ACP (7.94×25mm)	1910	?	0.59 kg	semi-automatic
FN Model 1922	FN Model 1910	FN and Colt Firearms	8	.380 ACP (9×17mm)	1925	?	0.7 kg	semi-automatic
Browning Hi-Power	P35	FN and Browning	10	7.65×21mm Parabellum	1935	1.500.000	1 kg	semi-automatic
M.73 revolver	M.73 revolver	Stevens, de Beaumont	6	9,4mmR No. 5 (9.4mm)	1873	?	1.04 kg	for support units
Mauser C96	Mauser C96	Mauser, Hanyang Arsenal	10	7.63×25mm Mauser	1899	?	1.13 kg	Dutch East Indies only
Borchhardt-Luger	Luger P08	DWM, Mauser	8	9×19mm Parabellum	1898	3.000.000	0.871 kg	Dutch East Indies only

=== Automatic pistols and submachine guns ===
Type	Base model	Maker	Rounds	Cartridge	From:	Produced	Weight	Comment
MP 28 II	MP 18	Haenel	50	7.63×25mm Mauser	1939	2420	4.18 kg	sergeant weapon in single cavalry regiment in Dutch East Indies
Thompson submachine gun M1928	Thompson submachine gun	Savage Arms and others	50(extended mags)	.45 ACP (11.43×23mm)	1942	2000	4.9 kg	Only in Dutch colonies, some may have not been delivered

=== Rifles ===
Type	Base model	Maker	Rounds	Cartridge	From:	Produced	Weight	Comment
Rifle M.95	Mannlicher M1895	Steyr-Mannlicher	5	6,5x53,5R	1896	470000	3.95 kg	also 8 derived carbine models
M1941 Johnson rifle	M1941 Johnson rifle	Iver Johnson, FMA	10	.30-06 Springfield	1941	~1000	4.31 kg	only in Dutch East Indies

=== Grenades and grenade launchers ===
See also:

Grenade	Introduced	Type	Weight, g	comments
Eihandgranaat No.1	?	fragmentation	600	used by Germans as "handgranate 312 (h)"
Eihandgranaat No.2	?	fragmentation	765	imported Mills No. 23, rod-type rifle launcher
Eihandgranaat No.3	?	concussion	215	used by Germans
Hexiet Rookhandgranaat	?	smoke	500	used by Germans as "333(h)"
Gashandgranaat	?	tear gas	~800	
Ronde handgranaat	1906	fragmentation	1065	colonial army only
Geweergranaat	1915	concussion	~420	colonial army only, hand-thrown version of Veldhandgranaat
Veldhandgranaat	1917	fragmentation	650	long handle, colonial army only
Offensieve handgranaat No.2	1928	concussion	650	paper&wood body, colonial army only, imported from USA
Offensieve handgranaat No.3 (US Mk.3)	1941	concussion	310	paper&steel body, colonial army only

== Machine guns ==
=== Infantry and dual-purpose machine guns ===
The Dutch army in 1940 was in the process of converting their machine guns to the unique 7.92×57mm rimmed cartridge. Exact numbers of machine guns converted is unknown.

Gun	Fire rate, RPM	Effective range	Cartridge	From:	Produced	Weight	Comment
Lewis gun M.20	550	800	6.5×53mmR and 7.92×57mmR	1917	9500	13 kg	occasional AA gun
Vickers machine gun	475	2000	.303 British (7.7×56mmR) and 7.92×57mmR	1912	300	23 kg	occasional AA gun, basis for aircraft guns
MG 08 Spandau heavy machine gun (M.25)	475	2000	7.92×57mm Mauser	1908	452	69 kg	occasional AA gun, obsolescent
Schwarzlose MG M.07/12 heavy machine gun (M.8)	490	1300	7.92×57mm Mauser	1905	2248	41.4 kg	
Madsen machine gun Geweermitrailleur	450		6.5×53mmR	1915		9.2 kg	Only in the Dutch East Indies.
Madsen machine gun Karabijnmitrailleur	450		6.5×53mmR	1926		8.4 kg	Only in the Dutch East Indies, shortened variant.

== Artillery ==
=== Infantry mortars ===
Model	Caliber	Max. range	From	Produced	Weight, kg	fire rate, RPM	Comment
Stokes mortar	81mm	800	1915	360	47.17	25	heavy recoil, therefore difficult to fire from improvised positions

=== Field artillery ===
Model	Caliber	Max. range	From	Produced	Weight, kg	fire rate, RPM	Comment
Krupp 7.5 cm Model 1903 (7-veld)	75mm	6000	1904	304	1079	8	partly license-built or upgraded to Siderius Model 02/04
8 cm staal	84mm	3500	1878	108	1517	2.5	
12 cm Lang staal	120mm	8500	1878	158	3450	1.5	former fortress gun, upgraded in the 1920s
15cm Krupp heavy field gun	150mm	8800	1878	72	4700	1	former fortress gun, upgraded in the 1920s
10.5 cm Cannon Model 1927 (10-veld)	105mm	16500	1926	52	3650	7	
Krupp 105mm field gun L30 M1905	105mm	9250	1912	2	2835	6	
120 mm Krupp howitzer M1905 (12 lang 12)	120mm	5800	1912	50	1125	2	
10.5 cm leFH 18	105mm	10675	1939	8	1985	5	imported, training-only
Bofors 12 cm M. 14 (12 lang 14)	120mm	6050	1918	10	1610	3	
BL 6-inch 26 cwt howitzer (15 lang 15)	152.4mm	8400	1918	30	3690	2	only extended-range version
15 cm sFH 13 (15 lang 17)	149.1mm	8600	1918	44	2250	3	World War I war reparations from Germany

=== Fortress and siege guns ===
See for geographic distribution of coastal defenses and fortresses in continental Netherlands. The listing below do include both army and land-based Navy weapons, but do not include 47mm guns, which are counted as anti-tank guns.

- Bofors 37 mm, 45 or 50 calibers barrel length : 23 pieces, of them 12 imported and 11 license-produced
- 75mm guns, 40 calibers barrel length : 63 pieces (2 distinct Krupp types, 5000m range, rapid-fire)
- 120mm guns, 40 calibers barrel length : 18 pieces (2 distinct Krupp types, 12500m range, 9 RPM fire rate)
- 149.1mm or 152.4mm guns, 30 calibers barrel length: 5 (type unknown)
- 149.1mm or 152.4mm guns, 35 calibers barrel length: 6 (type unknown)
- 149.1mm or 152.4mm guns, 40 calibers barrel length: 21 (Krupp guns, 14200m range, 9 RPM fire rate)
- 240mm guns, 30 calibers barrel length: 11 (Krupp guns of the 19th century, 8000m range, 0.25 RPM fire rate)

=== Infantry guns ===
Model	Caliber	Max. range	From	Produced	Weight, kg	fire rate, RPM	Comment
Krupp light field gun M1894 (6-veld)	57mm	5000	1894	210	700	5.5	used also as anti-tank

=== Anti-tank guns ===
Model	Caliber	Penetration 1	Penetration 2	Muzzle speed	Max. range	From	Produced	Weight, kg	fire rate, RPM	Comment
Bohler 47mm gun	47mm	58mm@100m	43mm@500m	630	7000	1935	380	315	5	also very effective as infantry gun
HIH Siderius 47mm casemate gun	47mm	50mm@1000m		750	2500	1931	8	1300	18	semi-automatic
Artillerie Inrichtingen 47mm casemate gun	47mm	50mm@1000m		750	2500	1932	60	1300	9	low-cost alternative to Siderius gun

=== Anti-tank weapons (besides anti-tank guns) ===
- Solothurn S-18/1000

== Anti-aircraft weapons ==
=== Light anti-aircraft guns ===
Model	Caliber	Eff. alt.	From	Produced	Weight, kg	fire rate, RPM	Comment
MG 08 Spandau heavy machine gun (M.25)	7.92mm	1300	1908	452	69	475	obsolescent, also infantry heavy machine gun
Vickers machine gun (M.18)	7.7mm	1300	1912	300	23	475	also infantry heavy machine gun
Bofors 40 mm gun L/60 (4 tl)	40mm	4100	1932	46	1981	120	light/medium AA gun
3.7 cm Flak 18/36/37/43 L/57	37mm	4200	1936	3	2000	150	no ammunition during war
Oerlikon 20 mm cannon L/70 (2 tl. No.1)	20mm	1300	1939	120	363	285	planned main light AA gun
Cannone-Mitragliera da 20/77 (Scotti) (2 tl. No.2)	20mm	914	1939	35	227.5	250	substitute for Oerlikon gun
Hispano-Suiza HS.404	20mm	1100	1939	30	~400	700	probably too lightly build barrel resulting in poor accuracy

=== Heavy anti-aircraft guns ===
Model	Caliber	Eff. alt.	From	Produced	Weight, kg	fire rate, RPM	Comment
Krupp gun 6 tl	57mm	2500	1916	21	7180	3	obsolescent
Krupp gun 7 tl	75mm	3300	1916	15	7980	5	obsolescent
QF 3-inch 20 cwt (8 tl)	76.2mm	3750	1917	3	5990	17	
Krupp gun (10 tl)	94mm	6800	1925	3	~10000	7.5	may be prototypes related to QF 3.7-inch AA gun development
Vickers Model 1931 (7.5 tl no.1)	75mm	8500	1935	81	2825	12	partially license-built, had a fire-control mechanical computer
Skoda AA gun (7.5 tl no.2)	75mm	6500	1940	9	4200	25	model unclear

== Vehicles ==
=== Tankettes ===
Carden Loyd Mk IV tankette - 5 tankettes used in Battle of the Netherlands

=== Tanks ===
- Marmon-Herrington CTLS - few used against Japanese on Java. 28 used in the West Indies & Suriname
- FT17 - 1 purchased in 1927 for trials
- Marmon-Herrington CTMS - 26 used in the West Indies & Suriname
- Marmon-Herrington MTLS - 19-20 used in the West Indies & Suriname
- Carden-Lloyd Light Amphibious tank m1931- 2 delivered to the KNIL in 1937
- Vickers Mark IIIB light tank - 75 ordered but only 25 delivered to the KNIL
- M3 tanks - 50 were being transported when the Dutch East Indies fell.

=== Armored cars ===
Vehicle	Year	Num.	Armament	Notes
Pantserwagen M36 (L181)	1936	12	37 mm Bofors cannon 3× 7.92 mm Lewis machine gun	
Pantserwagen M38 (L180)	1938	14	37mm Bofors cannon 3× 7.92mm Lewis machine gun	
Pantserwagen M39	1939	12	37mm Bofors cannon 3× 7.92mm Lewis machine gun	
Ehrhardt Potkachel	1918	1	57mm Krupp gun 6tl	
Alvis Strausser; AC3D	1938	12	Turret: 12.7 mm Colt-Browning MG Driver's left: 6.5 mm Vickers machine gun	
M3A1 Scout Car	1941	40	1× .50-caliber M2 Browning machine gun 2× .30-caliber M1919 Browning machine gun	
GMC 'Kippenhok'	1931	3	3× 6.5mm Lewis machine gun	
Morris Wijnman 'Koekblik'	1932	3	Up to 4× 6.5mm Lewis machine gun	
Wilton-Fijenoord	1933	3	3× 6.5mm Lewis machine gun	
Overvalwagen	1940	90	different versions had different armament	

=== Utility tractor ===
- VCL Utility Tractor - 50 ordered for the KNIL
- Praga TIII/3 Artillery Tractor - 1 prototype delivered to the KNIL.

=== Engineering and command ===
- L180 (M-38) - 2 of 14 armored cars were built as command cars (dummy main gun made of wood).

=== Trucks ===
All numbers are for European part of Dutch armed forces.

- horses 30000
- Trucks with Trado drive:
- Chevrolet KD/DAF (4x4)
- Chevrolet VD/DAF (6x4)
- Ford type 51/DAF (6x4)
- Ford type 79/DAF (6x4)
- Ford type 81Y/DAF (4x4)
- Ford type 91Y/DAF (4x4)
- Ford type 01Y/DAF (4x4)

1200 - mostly for towing artillery and 1 motorized light infantry division

- DAF-139 amphibious truck (prototype testing at outbreak of war)
- Ford Model AA 380 - in AA units
- Ford GP - in Dutch East Indies cavalry units

=== Passenger cars ===
- unknown models (~70-140 total) for carrying officers

=== Motorcycles ===
- BSA G14 and various others (at least 840 in 2 motorized cavalry regiments)

=== Miscellaneous vehicles ===
- bicycles (at least 1500000)

== Navy ships and war vessels ==
=== Royal Netherlands Navy ===
At the moment of the German attack on 10 May 1940 the Dutch European Navy consisted of 50 vessels:

- 1 light cruiser
- 3 coastal defense ships
- 10 destroyers
- 12 minelayers
- 4 minesweepers
- 6 submarines
- 14 auxiliary and light vessels

Also, 31 various vessels were under construction. Of these, six were eventually completed in England and 21 in Nazi Germany.

Present in the Dutch West Indies was the sloop Van Kinsbergen.

Destroyed or scuttled during Battle of the Netherlands:

- Destroyer Van Galen [Rotterdam, by a Stuka attack]
- Destroyer escort Christiaan Cornelis (scuttled after being damaged by coastal artillery)
- Destroyer escort Z3 (scuttled)
- Destroyer escort G16 (scuttled)
- Gunboat Johan Maurits van Nassau (sunk by Luftwaffe aircraft)
- Gunboat Friso (sunk by Luftwaffe aircraft)
- Gunboat Brinio (scuttled)
- Gunboat Braga (scuttled)
- Gunboat Helfring (scuttled)
- Gunboat Freyr (scuttled)
- Minelayer Hydra
- Minelayer Bulgia
- Minesweeper Abraham van Hulst (heavily damaged by Luftwaffe aircraft attack and scuttled)
- Minesweeper Pieter Floriszoon (scuttled)
- Minesweeper M III
- Submarine HNLMS O 12 (scuttled)
- Coastal defense ship HNLMS Batterijschip Ijmuiden (scuttled)

Escaped to England during Battle of the Netherlands:

- Light cruiser Sumatra
- Destroyer escort Z5
- Destroyer escort Z6
- Destroyer escort Z7
- Destroyer escort Z8
- Destroyer escort G13
- Destroyer escort G15
- Gunboat Flores
- Gunboat Gruno
- Minelayer Willem van der Zaan
- Minelayer Medusa
- Minelayer Van Maerlant
- Minelayer Douwe Aukes
- Minelayer Nautiles
- Minelayer Jan van Brakel
- Minesweeper Jan van Gelder
- Torpedo boat TM51
- Submarine O9
- Submarine O10
- Submarine O13
- Light-cruiser Jacob van Heemskerck (under construction at outbreak of war)
- Destroyer leader Isaac Sweers (under construction at outbreak of war)
- Submarine O21 (under construction at outbreak of war)
- Submarine O22 (under construction at outbreak of war)
- Submarine O23 (under construction at outbreak of war)
- Submarine O24 (under construction at outbreak of war)
- Many tugs, pilot boats and patrol boats

Captured by the Germans:

- Minesweepers MI (sunk and raised by Germans)
- Minesweepers MII (sunk and raised by Germans)
- Minesweepers MIV (sunk and raised by Germans)
- Gunboat Tyr
- Gunboat Balder
- Gunboat Hadda (unarmed at outbreak of war)
- Gunboat Thor (unarmed at outbreak of war)
- Minelayer Vidar
- Torpedo workship Vidar
- Submarines O 8
- Submarine O 11
- Coastal defense ship HMLMS Gelderland
- Coastal defense ship HNLMS Hertog Hendrik
- Cruiser De Zeven Provincien (under construction, not used by Germans)
- Cruiser HNLMS Eendracht (under construction, not used by Germans)
- Destroyer leader HNLMS Tjerk Hiddes (under construction, scrapped by Germans)
- Destroyer leader HNLMS Gerard Callenburgh (under construction, damaged and repaired by Germans)
- Destroyer leader HNLMS Philips van Almonde (under construction, scrapped by Germans)
- Submarine O 25 (under construction, finished by Germans)
- Submarine O 26 (under construction, finished by Germans)
- Submarine O 27 (under construction, finished by Germans)
- 6 Minesweepers (under construction, names not assigned, all used by Germans)
- Tanker (under construction, name not assigned, finished by Germans)
- 10 Fast attack craft (E-boats) (under construction, names not assigned, all finished and used by Germans in Mediterranean)

=== Royal Netherlands Navy in the East Indies ===
At the time of Japanese attack on 7 December 1941, the Dutch Navy in the East Indies comprised 78 vessels. Most of them were destroyed defending Java island:

- 3 light cruisers
- 7 destroyers
- 15 submarines
- 7 minelayers
- 11 minesweepers
- 35 auxiliary or small ships (of them 8 tankers)

Task Force One (Doorman; off Paternoster Island)

- Light cruiser De Ruyter
- Light cruiser Tromp
- Destroyer Van Ghent
- Destroyer Kortenaer
- Destroyer Piet Hein
- Destroyer Witte de With
- Destroyer Banckert

Task Force Two (Sunda Strait en route Singapore)

- Light cruiser Java
- Destroyer Evertsen
- Destroyer Van Nes

NEI Submarine Flotilla (at Surabaya)

- submarine tender Zuiderkruis
- SS K-VI
- SS K-VIII
- SS K-X

Submarine Division 1

- SS O-16 (Karimata Strait)
- SS K-XVII (north of Singapore)
- SS K-XVII

Submarine Division 2

- SS K-IX
- SS K-XI (north of Singapore)
- SS K-XII (north of Singapore)
- SS K-XIII (north of Singapore)

Submarine Division 3

- SS K-XIV (South China Sea)
- SS K-XV (South China Sea)
- SS K-XVI (South China Sea)

Submarine Division 4

- SS O-19 (South China Sea)
- SS O-20 (South China Sea)

Mine Service (at Surabaya)

- CM Gouden Leeuw (at Tarakan)
- CM Prinz Van Oranje
- CM Krakatau
- CM Pro Patria (at Palembang)
- CM Serdang
- CM Willem van der Zaan (Lingga)
- CM Rigel

Minesweeper Division 3

- AMc Alor
- AMc Aroe
- AMc Bantam
- AMc Bogor
- AMc Ceram
- AMc Cheribon

Minesweeper Division 4 (at Surabaya)

- AMc Djember
- AMc Djombang
- AMc Djampea
- AMc Enggano
- AMc Endeh

Torpedo Division (at Surabaya)

- PT TM-4 to TM-15 (12 vessels)
- Tanker AO Aldegonda
- Tanker AO Benakat (4763 tons, 10 knots)
- Tanker AO Djirak (4325 tons, 10 knots)
- Tanker AO Josefina
- Tanker AO Juno (2741 tons, 9 knots)
- Tanker AO Paula (2700 tons, 12 knots)
- Tanker AO Pendopo (7150 tons, 10 knots)
- Tanker AO Petronella
- AT Kraus
- AT Pief
- AT Gina
- AT Jules
- AT Nolly
- AT Tata
- AT Flip
- AT Rolf
- AT Hector
- AT Paul
- AT Teddy
- AR Moeara Boelian
- AH Op Ten Noort

== Aircraft ==
The Dutch before war have an extensive aircraft industry, but most of the aircraft produced were exported and not counted here.

Name	Place of manufacture	Primary role(s)	# used in Europe	# used in Indonesia	years in use	comments
Fokker D.XXI	Dutch	fighter	36	0	1936-1940	
Curtiss P-6 Hawk	Dutch (license)	fighter	0	11	1930-1942	also 3 P-6 were destroyed before war
Curtiss H-75 Hawk (export Curtiss P-36)	US	fighter	0	24	1940-1942	model Hawk 75A-7
Brewster B339 (F2A-2 Buffalo)	US	fighter	0	71	1941-1942	
Fokker D.XXIII	Dutch	fighter	1	0	1939-1940	tandem engines, prototype under test at outbreak of war
Fokker D.XVII	Dutch	fighter/trainer	7	0	1932-1940	2 of 7 destroyed on ground at beginning of war
Fokker G.I	Dutch	heavy fighter	35	0	1937-1940	also 1 Fokker G.I destroyed before war
Fokker G.I(export version)	Dutch	heavy fighter	6	0	1940-1940	24 were produced, but refit was not finished in time
Fokker T.V	Dutch	bomber	15	0	1938-1940	also 1 Fokker T.V destroyed before war
Fokker C.V	Dutch	bomber/reconnaissance	28	0	1924-1940	only 28 of 67 were operational at start of war
Fokker C.VIII	Dutch	reconnaissance	1	0	1928-1940	land-version (prototype) of seaplane Fokker C.VIII-W)
Fokker C.VIII-W	Dutch	Maritime patrol	9	0	1928-1940	5 of 9 fled to England and were scrapped immediately
Fokker C.X	Dutch	bomber/reconnaissance/trainer	20	13	1933-1942	
Koolhoven F.K.51	Dutch	trainer/reconnaissance	83	38	1935-1942	
Koolhoven F.K.52	Dutch	fighter/reconnaissance	5	0	1937-1940	also 1 aircraft lost before war
Koolhoven F.K.58	Dutch	fighter	18	0	1938-1940	manned by Poles, fought for France (not in Dutch army)
Fokker S.IX	Dutch	trainer	50	0	1935-1942	some escaped to England and were scrapped immediately
Bücker Bü 131	Germany	trainer	0	?	1935-1942	
Curtiss-Wright CW-21B	US	interceptor	0	24	1942-1942	17 ready at start of Japanese attack
Dornier Do J Wal	Dutch (license)	Maritime patrol	1	5	1937-1942	most were already scrapped at outbreak of war
Dornier Do 24	Dutch (license)	maritime patrol	0	37	1937-1942	replacement for Dornier Wal, imported and license-produced in Netherlands.
Fokker T.IVa	Dutch	Maritime patrol/torpedo bomber	0	33	1927-1942	
Fokker C.XI	Dutch	scout seaplane	4	10	1935-1942	operated from Dutch cruisers and destroyers
Fokker C.VII	Dutch	seaplane trainer	0	12	1927-1942	30 were produced, but 18 in Europe retired before war
Fokker C.XIV-W	Dutch	trainer/Maritime patrol	13	11	1927-1942	12 were transferred from Europe to Dutch East Indies after war in Europe was lost
Fokker F.XVIII	Dutch	airliner/Maritime patrol	0	5	1940-1942	stop-gap ASW aircraft, later reverted to airliner
Fokker T.VIII	Dutch	Maritime patrol	11	0	1938-1940	some aircraft escaped to England and many captured by Germans
Consolidated PBY Catalina	US	Maritime patrol	0	48	1935-1942	36 Consolidated 28-5 (export PBY-5) and 12 PBY-5A
Martin 139 (export B-10)	US	Bomber	0	121	1938-1945	Pre-WW2 bomber in Dutch possession
Fokker T.IX	Dutch	Bomber	1	0	1939-1940	prototype being repaired at outbreak of war

== Cartridges and shells ==
- .32 ACP (7.94×25mm)
- .380 ACP (9×25mm)
- 11mm French Ordnance (11.46×30mm)
- 6.5×53mmR (main rifle cartridge)
- 7.92×56R (main MG cartridge)
- .303 British (7.7×56mmR)

== Notes ==
Dutch colonies fought until May 8th, 1942 when the Dutch East Indies surrendered to the imperial Japanese.
