= USS Makassar Strait =

Casablanca-class escort carrier of the US Navy

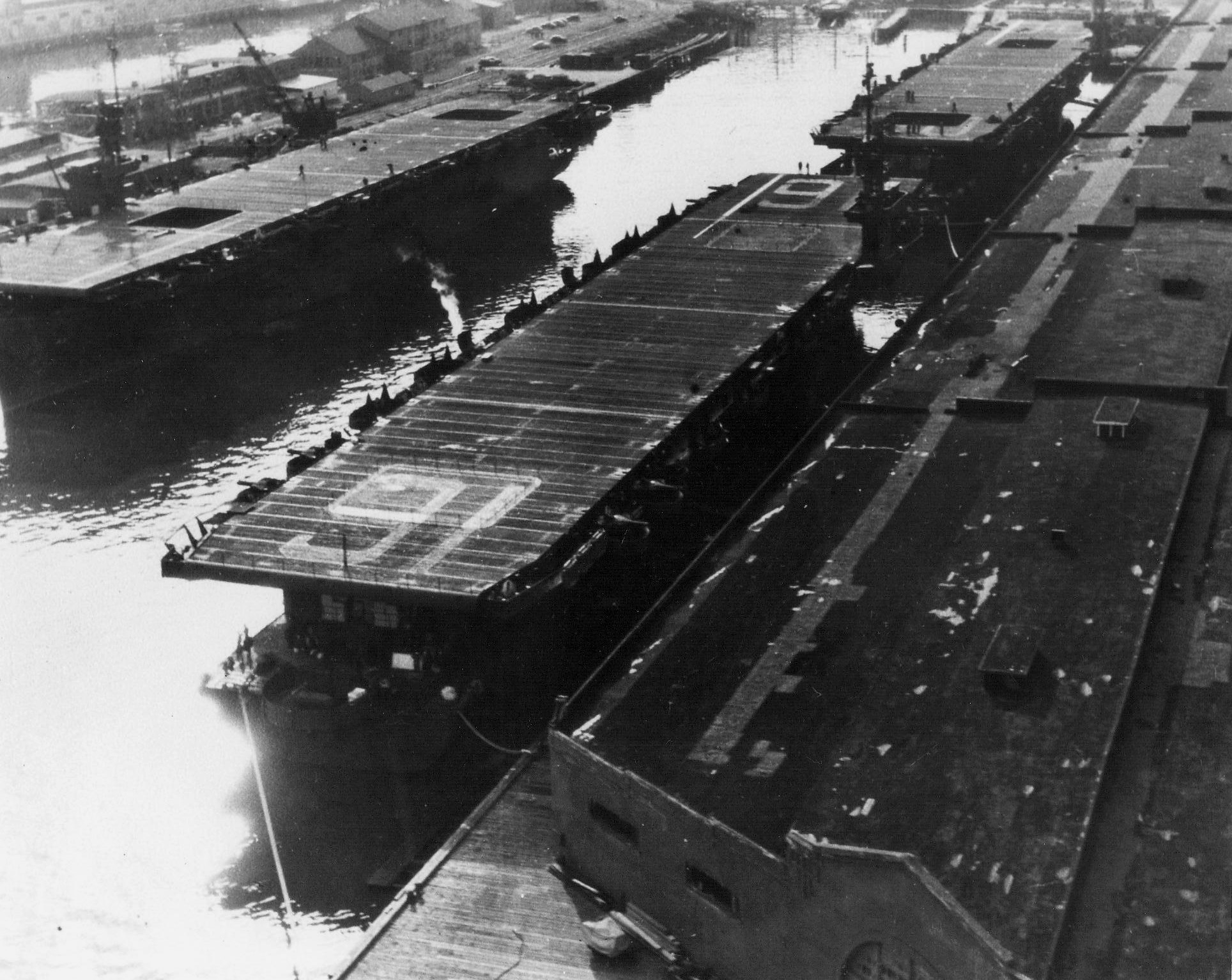
- USS Makassar Strait at dock, 1951

History

United States
- Name: Makassar Strait
- Namesake: Battle of Makassar Strait
- Ordered: as a Type S4-S2-BB3 hull, MCE hull 1128
- Awarded: 18 June 1942
- Builder: Kaiser Shipyards
- Laid down: 29 December 1943
- Launched: 22 March 1944
- Commissioned: 27 April 1944
- Decommissioned: 9 August 1946
- Stricken: 1 September 1958
- Identification: Hull symbol: CVE-91
- Honors and awards: 2 Battle stars
- Fate: Grounded and used as a target, April 1961

General characteristics
- Class & type: Casablanca-class escort carrier
- Displacement: 8,188 long tons (8,319 t) (standard); 10,902 long tons (11,077 t) (full load)
- Length: 512 ft 3 in (156.13 m) (oa); 490 ft (150 m) (wl); 474 ft (144 m) (fd)
- Beam: 65 ft 2 in (19.86 m); 108 ft (33 m) (extreme width)
- Draft: 20 ft 9 in (6.32 m) (max)
- Installed power: 4 × Babcock & Wilcox boilers; 9,000 shp (6,700 kW)
- Propulsion: 2 × Skinner Unaflow reciprocating steam engines; 2 × screws
- Speed: 19 knots (35 km/h; 22 mph)
- Range: 10,240 nmi (18,960 km; 11,780 mi) at 15 kn (28 km/h; 17 mph)
- Complement: Total: 910 – 916 officers and men; Embarked Squadron: 50 – 56; Ship's Crew: 860
- Armament: As designed: 1 × 5 in (127 mm)/38 cal dual-purpose gun; 4 × twin 40 mm (1.57 in) Bofors anti-aircraft guns; 12 × 20 mm (0.79 in) Oerlikon anti-aircraft cannons; Varied, ultimate armament: 1 × 5 in (127 mm)/38 cal dual-purpose gun; 8 × twin 40 mm (1.57 in) Bofors anti-aircraft guns; 20 × 20 mm (0.79 in) Oerlikon anti-aircraft cannons
- Aircraft carried: 27
- Aviation facilities: 1 × catapult; 2 × elevators

Service record
- Part of: United States Pacific Fleet (1944–1946); Pacific Reserve Fleet (1946–1958)
- Operations: Battle of Okinawa; Operation Magic Carpet

USS Makassar Strait (CVE-91) was a Casablanca-class escort carrier of the United States Navy. She was named after the Battle of Makassar Strait, an early naval engagement to the east of Borneo. Launched in March 1944, and commissioned in April, she served in support of the Battle of Okinawa. Postwar, she participated in Operation Magic Carpet. She was decommissioned in August 1946, when she was mothballed in the Pacific Reserve Fleet. Ultimately, she was used as a target, and she was accidentally run aground on San Nicolas Island in April 1961. Her wreckage survived until at least 1965.

== Design and description ==
A side profile of the design of Thetis Bay.

Makassar Strait was a Casablanca-class escort carrier, the most numerous type of aircraft carriers ever built. Built to stem heavy losses during the Battle of the Atlantic, they came into service in late 1943, by which time the U-boat threat was already in retreat. Although some did see service in the Atlantic, the majority were utilized in the Pacific, ferrying aircraft, providing logistics support, and conducting close air support for the island-hopping campaigns. The Casablanca-class carriers were built on the standardized Type S4-S2-BB3 hull, a lengthened variant of the Doyen-class hull, and specifically designed to be mass-produced using welded prefabricated sections. This allowed them to be produced at unprecedented speeds: the final ship of her class, Munda, was delivered to the Navy just 101 days after the laying of her keel.

Makassar Strait was 512 ft 3 in (156.13 m) long overall (490 ft (150 m) at the waterline), had a beam of 65 ft 2 in (19.86 m), and a draft of 20 ft 9 in (6.32 m). She displaced 8,188 long tons (8,319 t) standard, which increased to 10,902 long tons (11,077 t) with a full load. To carry out flight operations, the ship had a 257 ft (78 m) hangar deck and a 474 ft (144 m) flight deck. Her compact size necessitated the installation of an aircraft catapult at her bow, and there were two aircraft elevators to facilitate movement of aircraft between the flight and hangar deck: one each fore and aft.

She was powered by four Babcock & Wilcox Express D boilers that raised 285 psi (1,970 kPa) of steam at 577 °F (303 °C). The steam generated by these boilers fed two Skinner Unaflow reciprocating steam engines, delivering 9,000 hp (6,700 kW) to two propeller shafts. This allowed her to reach speeds of 19 kn (35 km/h; 22 mph), with a cruising range of 10,240 nmi (18,960 km; 11,780 mi) at 15 kn (28 km/h; 17 mph). For armament, one 5 in (127 mm)/38 caliber dual-purpose gun was mounted on the stern. Additional anti-aircraft defense was provided by eight Bofors 40 mm (1.57 in) anti-aircraft guns in single mounts and twelve Oerlikon 20 mm (0.79 in) cannons mounted around the perimeter of the deck. By 1945, Casablanca-class carriers had been modified to carry twenty Oerlikon cannons and sixteen Bofors guns; the doubling of the latter was accomplished by putting them into twin mounts. Sensors onboard consisted of a SG surface-search radar and a SK air-search radar.

Although Casablanca-class escort carriers were intended to function with a crew of 860 and an embarked squadron of 50 to 56, the exigencies of wartime often necessitated the inflation of the crew count. They were designed to operate with 27 aircraft, but the hangar deck could accommodate much more during transport or training missions. During the Battle of Okinawa, she carried 16 FM-2 fighters, and 12 TBM-3 torpedo bombers, for a total of 28 aircraft.

== Construction ==
Her construction was awarded to Kaiser Shipbuilding Company of Vancouver, Washington, under a Maritime Commission contract, on 18 June 1942, under the name Ulitaka Bay, as part of a tradition which named escort carriers after bays or sounds in Alaska. She was renamed Makassar Strait on 6 November 1943, as part of a new naval policy which named subsequent Casablanca-class carriers after naval or land engagements. The escort carrier was laid down on 29 December 1943, MC hull 1128, the thirty-sixth of a series of fifty Casablanca-class escort carriers. She was launched on 22 March 1944; sponsored by Mrs. Truman J. Hedding; transferred to the United States Navy and commissioned on 27 April 1944, with Captain Warren Kenneth Berner in command.

== Service history ==
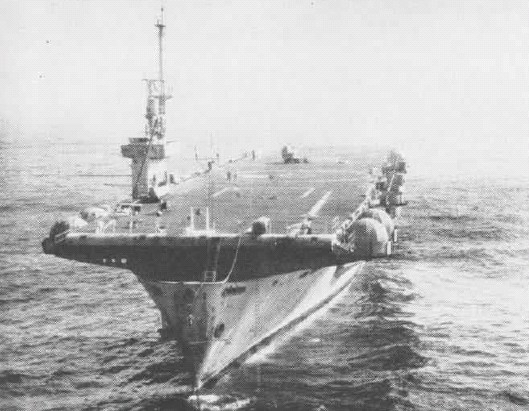
Makassar Strait being used as an unmanned anchored missile test target, sometime in the late 1950s.

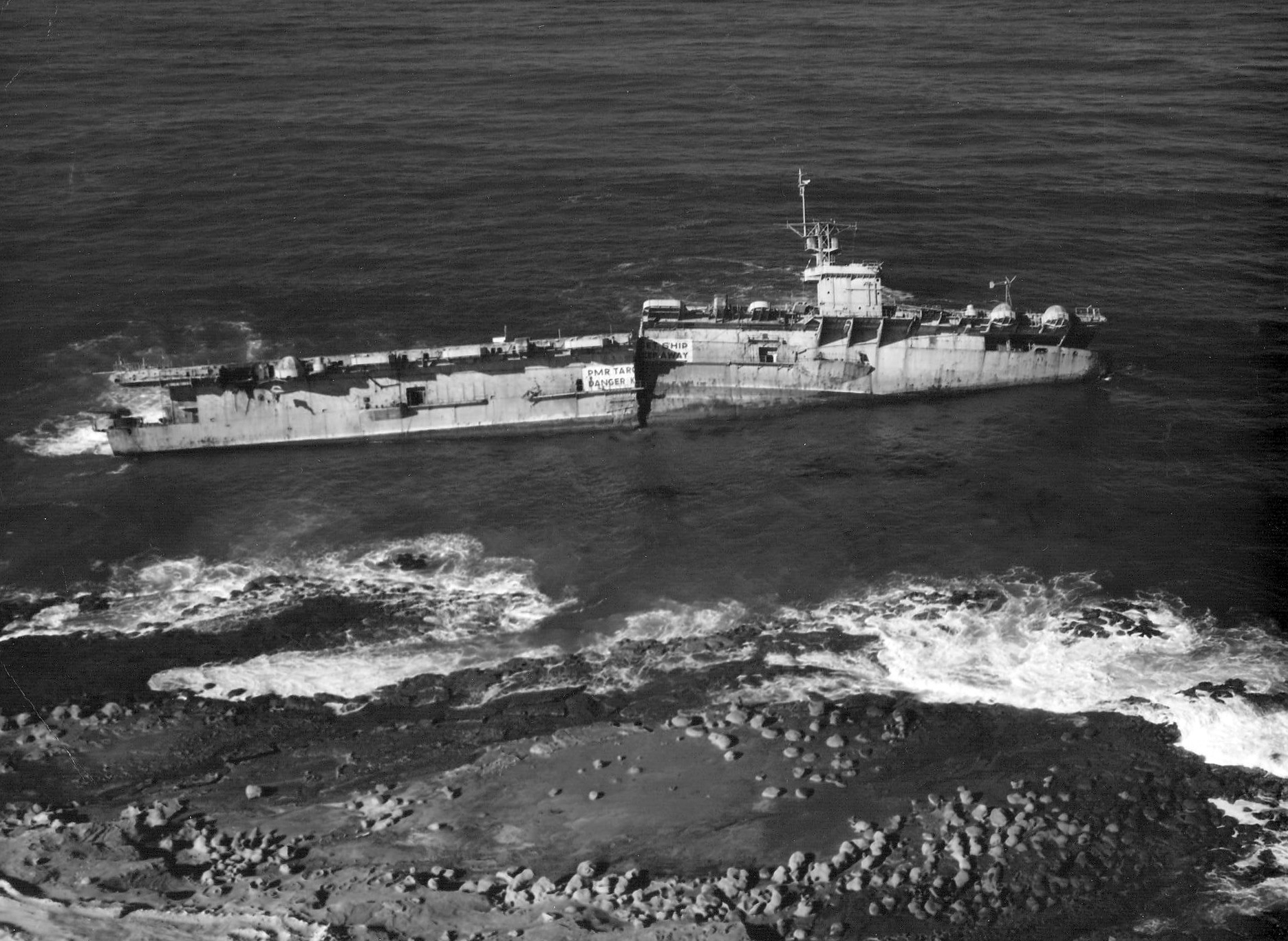
Makassar Strait grounded as a target ship, 1963. Note the warning painted onto the hull.

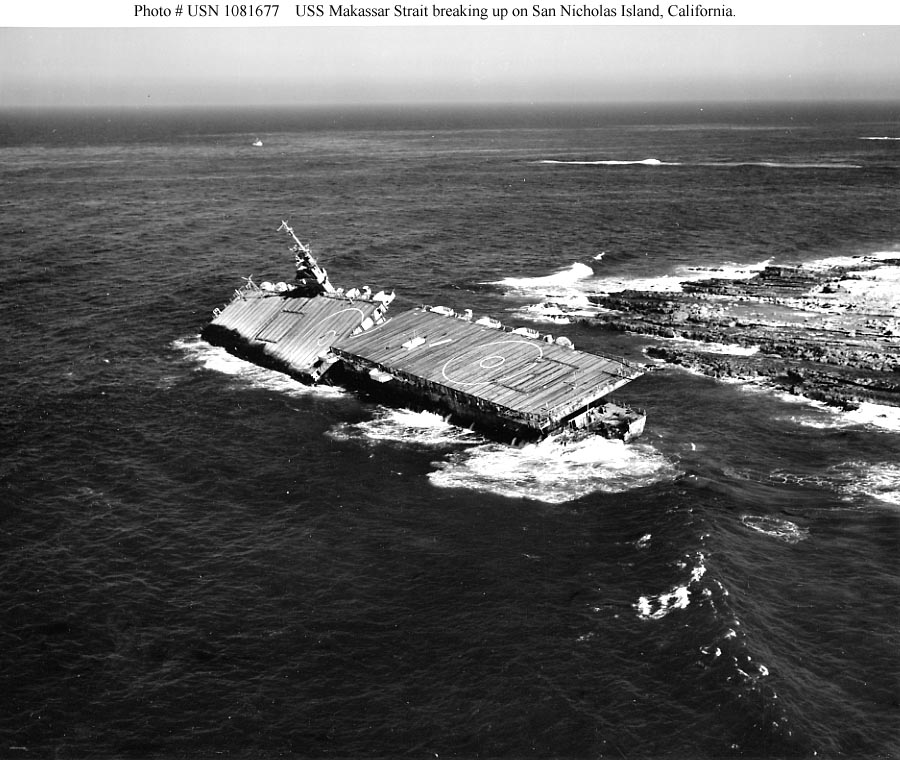
Makassar Strait grounded and split neatly in half. Photographed on 22 January 1963.

Upon being commissioned, Makassar Strait underwent a shakedown cruise down the West Coast to San Diego. On 6 June, she departed San Diego, transporting aircraft and passengers to the Marshall Islands, making a stop at Pearl Harbor along the way. On her return trip, she loaded military wounded, and ferried them back to the West Coast, arriving back at Southern California on 13 July. She spent the next two months as a training carrier, conducting pilot qualifications off Southern California. On 25 September, she left for another transport mission, ferrying 129 aircraft to Hawaii and the Admiralty Islands. She returned to Pearl Harbor on 26 October, with a load of damaged fighters, where she resumed training operations.

For the next three months, until the new year, she served yet again as a training carrier in the waters surrounding Hawaii, hosting a dozen different air groups on her deck. Captain Herbert D. Riley assumed command on January 10, 1945. About 6,700 landings were made on her flight deck, as she conducted various types of exercises. After loading her permanent aircraft contingent, Composite Squadron 97 (VC-97), she departed Pearl Harbor on 29 January 1945, and was assigned to Task Group 50.8 (Logistics Support Group). She stopped at Enewetak Atoll, before assuming her role protecting convoys supporting the frontline Fast Carrier Task Force. She also provided air screens for the transfer of replacement aircraft to their carriers.

She was assigned to a support carrier group on 8 April, and began conducting operations with the main strike group of Task Group 52.1. She consequently began combat operations over Okinawa in support of the ongoing battle. For the next four weeks, she provided close air support and bombed Japanese defenses as the marines struggled to fight their way south. During these operations, her fighters shot down four Japanese aircraft. She ceased operations over Okinawa on 7 May, when she transferred her aircraft contingent to Shipley Bay at Kerama Retto, which was to serve as her replacement.

After retiring from Okinawa, she arrived at Guam on 11 May. She then operated as a training carrier in the vicinity of the Mariana Islands, providing refresher training for pilots. She finished her duties and left for Hawaii on 19 July, making a stop at Kwajalein Atoll, where she loaded fifty aircraft. She arrived at Pearl Harbor on 29 July, where she took on 387 passengers. She then proceeded, on 14 August, to sail for the West Coast. She arrived at San Diego on 21 August, and served, yet again, as a training carrier off the Southern California coast until well past the Japanese surrender. By the end of October, there had been over 15,500 recorded landings on her flight deck.

On 4 November, she left San Diego, and joined the "Magic Carpet" fleet, which repatriated U.S. servicemen from throughout the Pacific. She sailed for Pearl Harbor, where she shipped troops to the Marshall Islands. She then stopped at Kwajalein, where she took on 1,092 veterans, and sailed back to the West Coast, arriving at San Diego on 29 November. On 4 December, she left for Guam, returning on 3 January 1946, repatriating a further 1,123 veterans back to the United States. She departed San Diego on 5 January, heading to Tacoma, Washington, making a stop at San Francisco. Upon arriving on 12 January, she was mothballed with the 19th Fleet, which would later become known as the Pacific Reserve Fleet.

She was declassified and decommissioned on 9 August 1946. She was reclassified as CVU-91 on 12 June 1955. On 28 August 1958, she was authorized to be used as a target and destroyed, and she was struck from the Navy list on 1 September 1958. During the next three years, she was used by the navy to gather data on the use of surface-launched missiles. During April 1961, while under tow to San Clemente Island off Southern California, she accidentally ran aground on San Nicholas Island in the Channel Islands. The Navy then sold her for breaking in situ on 2 May 1961. However, she was not scrapped, partially due to her less than optimal position. In 1965, it was known that she had not yet been broken up and was still being used as a target by the navy. Notably, by then, the entire escort carrier had since been split in half by the grounding.

== Sources ==
=== Online sources ===
- "Makassar Strait (CVE-91)". Dictionary of American Naval Fighting Ships. Naval History and Heritage Command. 27 April 2016. This article incorporates text from this source, which is in the public domain.
- "Kaiser Vancouver, Vancouver WA". www.ShipbuildingHistory.com. 27 November 2010. Archived from the original on 16 June 2019.
- "World Aircraft Carriers List: US Escort Carriers, S4 Hulls". Hazegray.org. 14 December 1998. Archived from the original on 19 November 2021.
- Maksel, Rebecca (14 August 2012). "How Do You Name an Aircraft Carrier?". Air & Space/Smithsonian.
- Stubblebine, Daniel (June 2011). "Escort Carrier Makin Island (CVE-93)". ww2db.com.

=== Bibliography ===
- Adcock, Al (1996), Escort Carriers in Action - Warships No. 9, Carrollton, Texas: Squadron/Signal Publications, ISBN 9780897473569
- Chesneau, Robert; Gardiner, Robert (1980), Conway's All the World's Fighting Ships 1922–1946, London, England: Naval Institute Press, ISBN 9780870219139
- Friedman, Norman (1983), U.S. Aircraft Carriers: An Illustrated Design History, Annapolis, Maryland: Naval Institute Press, ISBN 9780870217395
- Grobmeier, A. H. (2004). "Question 39/03: Loss of Makassar Strait (CVU-91)". Warship International. XLI (4): 339. ISSN 0043-0374.
- Ross, Al (1993), The Escort Carrier Gambier Bay, Anatomy of the Ship, London, England: Conway Maritime Press, ISBN 9781557502353
- Y'Blood, William (2012), The Little Giants: U.S. Escort Carriers Against Japan, Annapolis, Maryland: Naval Institute Press, ISBN 9781612512471
