= Admiralen-class destroyer =

Dutch warship class (1928–1942)

Admiralen class
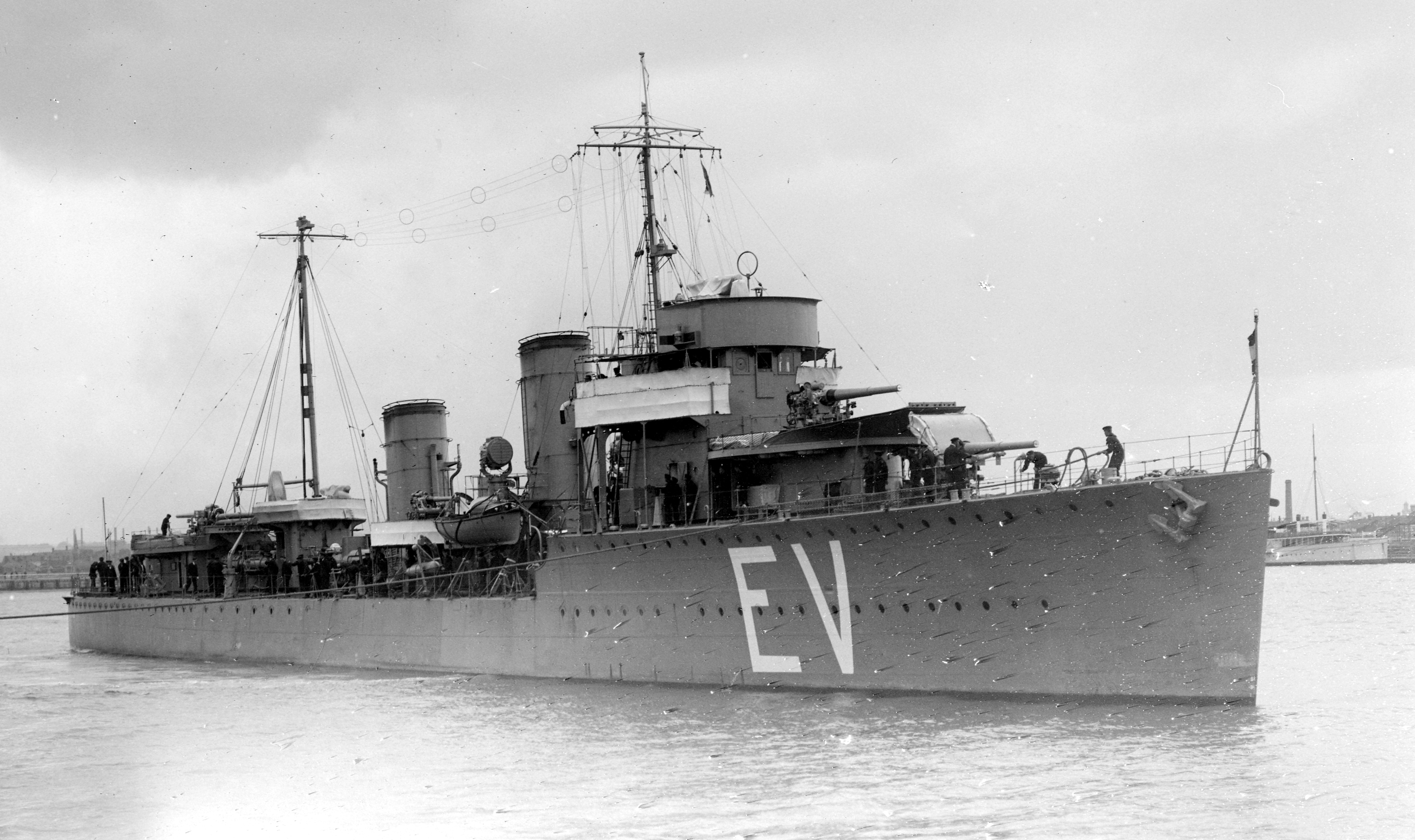
- Evertsen

Class overview
- Name: Admiralen class
- Builders: Burgerhout; Koninklijke Maatschappij De Schelde; Fijenoord
- Operators: Royal Netherlands Navy
- Preceded by: Wolf class
- Succeeded by: Gerard Callenburgh class
- Built: 1926–1930
- In commission: 1928–1942
- Completed: 8
- Lost: 8

General characteristics
- Type: Destroyer
- Displacement: 1,316 long tons (1,337 t) (standard)
- Length: 98 m (321 ft 6 in)
- Beam: 9.53 m (31 ft 3 in)
- Draught: 2.97 m (9 ft 9 in)
- Installed power: 3 Yarrow boilers; 23,000 kW (31,000 shp)
- Propulsion: 2 shafts; 2 geared steam turbines
- Speed: 36 knots (67 km/h; 41 mph)
- Range: 3,200 nmi (5,900 km; 3,700 mi) at 15 knots (28 km/h; 17 mph)
- Complement: 129 (120 in second group)
- Aircraft carried: 1 × floatplane

General characteristics First group
- Armament: 4 × 120 mm (4.7 in) no. 4 Bofors guns (4 × 1); 2 × 75 mm (3 in) no. 6 AA guns; 4 × 13 mm (.5 in) Browning machine guns; 6 × 533 mm (21 in) torpedo tubes (2 × 3)

General characteristics Second group
- Armament: 4 × 120 mm (4.7 in) no. 5 HIH Siderius guns (4 × 1); 1 × 75 mm (3 in) no. 7 (VG, WW) and no. 8 AA HIH Siderius (BK, VN) guns; 4 × 40 mm (1.6 in) no. 1 Vickers AA guns; 4 × 13 mm (.5 in) Browning machine guns; 6 × 533 mm (21 in) torpedo tubes (2 × 3)

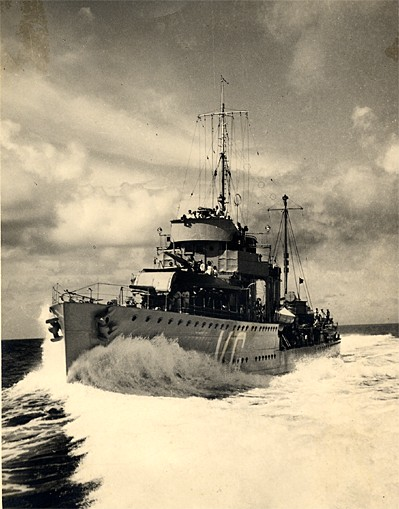
HNLMS Van Galen

Plan from 1930 of HNLMS Banckert and HNLMS Van Nes

The Admiralen class consisted of eight destroyers built for the Royal Netherlands Navy during the 1920s. All ships fought in World War II and were scuttled or sunk.

== Design and description ==
The Admiralen class was built to replace the Wolf-class destroyers. Their design was derived from that of the destroyer Ambuscade, an experimental British ship designed after the First World War. The ships had an overall length of 98.15 meters (322 ft), a beam of 9.53 meters (31 ft 3 in), and a draft of 2.97 meters (9 ft 9 in). The first batch of four ships displaced 1,310 metric tons (1,290 long tons) at standard displacement while the second-batch ships were 30 long tons (30 t) heavier at full load at 1,640 metric tons (1,610 long tons). Their crew consisted of 143 men.

The Admiralens were powered by two geared Parsons steam turbines, each driving one propeller shaft using steam provided by three Yarrow boilers. The turbines were designed to produce 31,000 shaft horsepower (23,000 kW) which was intended give the ships a speed of 36 knots (67 km/h; 41 mph). One of the differences from the first-batch ships was that the second-batch ships carried additional fuel oil which gave them an extra 100 nautical miles (190 km; 120 mi) of range, for a total of 3,300 nautical miles (6,100 km; 3,800 mi) at 15 knots (28 km/h; 17 mph).

The main armament of the Admiralen-class ships consisted of four 120-millimeter (4.7 in) guns in single mounts, one superfiring pair fore and aft of the superstructure. The guns were designated 'A', 'B', 'X' and 'Y' from front to rear and only 'A' and 'Y' were fitted with gun shields. The first-batch ships were equipped with two 75-millimeter (3 in) anti-aircraft (AA) guns that were positioned between the funnels. The second-batch ships had only a single 75 mm AA gun and four 2-pounder (40 mm (1.6 in)) AA guns; these were on single mounts amidships. All the ships were fitted with four 13 mm (.5 in) Browning machine guns on single mounts. All of the Admiralens were equipped with two rotating, triple mounts for 533-millimeter (21 in) torpedo tubes. They were able to carry a Fokker C.VII-W floatplane that had to be hoisted off the ship to take off. While the first batch of Admiralens were fitted to lay mines, the second-batch ships could be equipped with minesweeping gear.

== Ships ==
Admiralen-class destroyers
| Name | Laid down | Launched | Commissioned | Builder | Fate |
First group
| Van Ghent ex-De Ruyter | 28 August 1925 | 23 October 1926 | 31 May 1928 | Koninklijke Maatschappij De Schelde | Served in the Netherlands East Indies as part of Admiral Karel Doorman's command. Ran aground and was scuttled on 15 February 1942. |
| Evertsen | 5 August 1925 | 29 December 1926 | 12 April 1928 | Burgerhout | Served in the Far East. Sunk by the Imperial Japanese Navy on 1 March 1942. |
| Kortenaer | 24 August 1925 | 30 June 1927 | 3 September 1928 | Burgerhout | Served in the Far East. Sunk by a torpedo from the Haguro during the Battle of the Java Sea on 27 February 1942. |
| Piet Hein | 26 August 1925 | 2 April 1927 | 25 January 1928 | Burgerhout | Served in the Far East. Sunk by Japanese destroyers during the Battle of Badung Strait on 19 February 1942. |
Second group
| Van Galen | 28 May 1927 | 28 June 1928 | 22 October 1929 | Fijenoord | Based in the Netherlands at the start of World War II, the ship was dispatched to help with the defence of Rotterdam. Targeted by German bombers in the narrow river she suffered bomb damage and sank on 10 May 1940. The wreck was salvaged and scrapped by the Germans. |
| Witte de With | 28 May 1927 | 11 September 1928 | 20 February 1930 | Fijenoord | Scuttled on 2 March 1942 on account of damage incurred during the Battle of the Java Sea. |
| Banckert | 15 August 1928 | 14 November 1929 | 14 November 1930 | Burgerhout | Damaged by Japanese bombers and scuttled in Surabaya dockyard. Salvaged by the Japanese, but not repaired and returned to the Dutch after the war. Sunk as a target in September 1949. |
| Van Nes | 15 August 1928 | 20 March 1930 | 12 March 1931 | Burgerhout | Sunk after a two-hour battle by Japanese aircraft on 17 February 1942, while escorting an evacuation ship (which was also sunk). |

== See also ==
- List of destroyers of the Netherlands

== Bibliography ==
- Cox, Jeffrey (2014). Rising Sun, Falling Skies: The Disastrous Java Sea Campaign of World War II. Osprey Publishing. ISBN 978-1-4728-1060-1.
- Goossens, A.M.A. (2007), Het Staatsbedrijf der Artillerie Inrichtingen, p. 9
- Mark, Chris (1997). Schepen van de Koninklijke Marine in W.O. II (in Dutch). De Alk. ISBN 90-6013-522-9.
- McMurtrie, Francis E., ed. (1940). Jane's Fighting Ships 1940. London: Sampson Low.
- Noppen, Ryan K. (2020). The Royal Netherlands Navy of World War II. New Vanguard. Oxford: Osprey Publishing. ISBN 9781472841926.
- Roberts, John (1980). "The Netherlands". In Chesneau, Roger (ed.). Conway's All the World's Fighting Ships 1922–1946. Conway Maritime Press. pp. 385–396. ISBN 0-85177-146-7.
- van Willigenburg, Henk (2010). Dutch Warships of World War II. Emmen: Lanasta. ISBN 978-90-8616-318-2.
- Whitley, M. J. (2000). Destroyers of World War Two: An International Encyclopedia. Cassell & Co. ISBN 1-85409-521-8.
