= HNLMS Van Nes (1930) =

Coordinates: 3°27′S 106°38′E

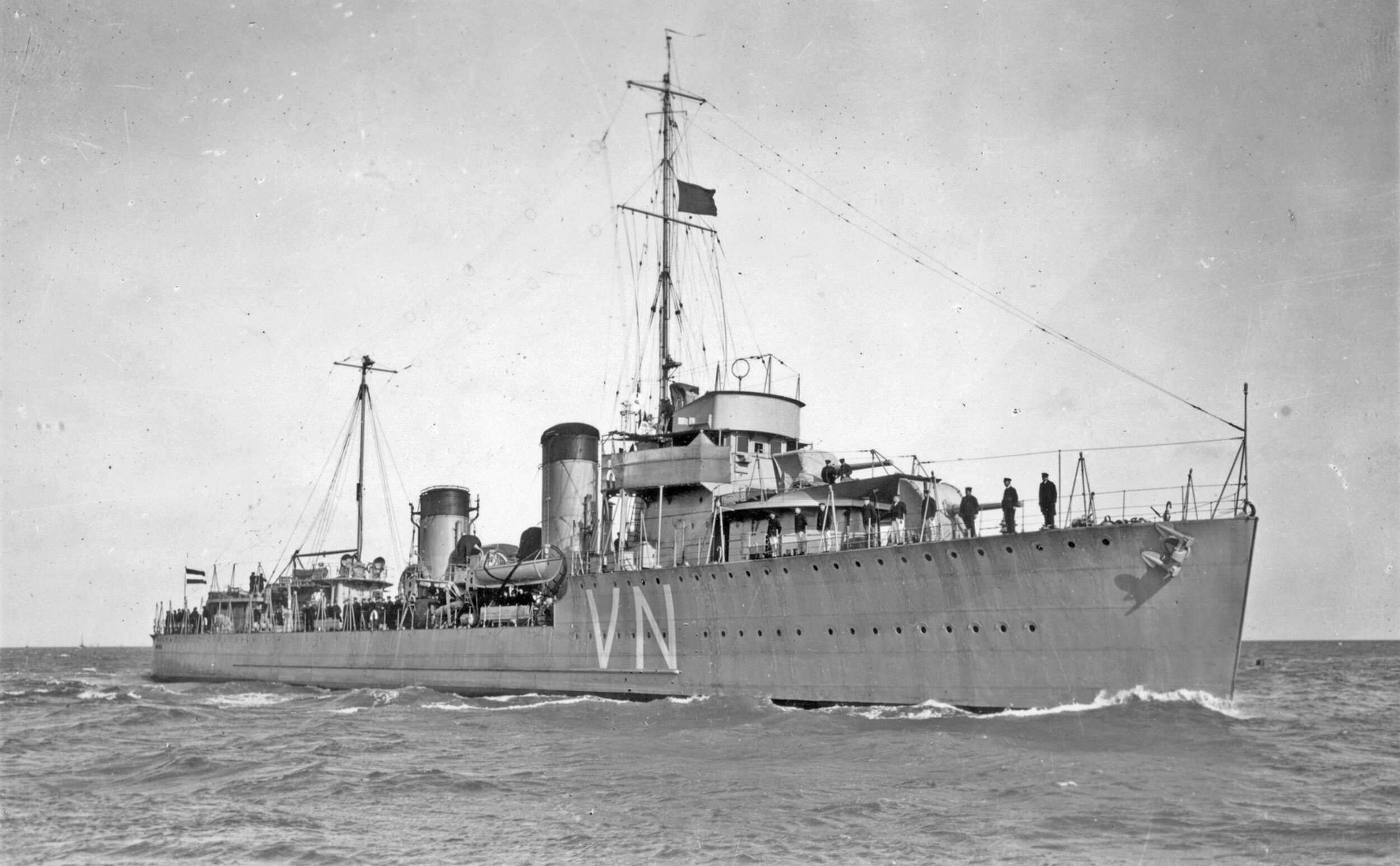
- HNLMS Van Nes

History

Netherlands
- Name: Van Nes
- Namesake: Jan Jansse van Nes
- Builder: Burgerhout, Rotterdam
- Laid down: 15 August 1928
- Launched: 20 March 1930
- Commissioned: 12 March 1931
- Fate: Sunk, 17 February 1942

General characteristics
- Class & type: Admiralen-class destroyer
- Displacement: 1,316 long tons (1,337 t) standard; 1,640 long tons (1,666 t) full load
- Length: 98 m (321 ft 6 in)
- Beam: 9.53 m (31 ft 3 in)
- Draft: 2.97 m (9 ft 9 in)
- Installed power: 3 × Yarrow type boilers; 31,000 hp (23 MW)
- Propulsion: 2 × Parsons geared turbines; 2 × shafts
- Speed: 36 knots (67 km/h; 41 mph)
- Range: 3,200 nmi (5,900 km; 3,700 mi) at 15 kn (28 km/h; 17 mph)
- Complement: 149
- Armament: 4 × 120 mm (4.7 in) guns (4×1); 1 × 75 mm (3 in) AA gun; 4 × 40 mm (1.6 in) AA guns; 4 × 12.7 mm (0.50 in) guns; 6 × 533 mm (21 in) torpedo tubes (2×3)
- Aircraft carried: 1 × Fokker C.VII-W floatplane
- Aviation facilities: crane

HNLMS Van Nes (Dutch: Hr.Ms. Van Nes) was a Admiralen-class destroyer of the Royal Netherlands Navy, named after the 17th century Dutch admiral Jan Jansse van Nes. She served during World War II.

== Service history ==
The ship was laid down on 15 August 1928, at the Burgerhout's Scheepswerf en Machinefabriek, in Rotterdam, and launched on 20 March 1930. The ship was commissioned on 12 March 1931.

Van Nes escorted the submarine K XIII back to Surabaya, to be repaired there after the vessel was damaged as a result of a battery explosion in Singapore harbor, on 21 December 1941. Three men were killed in the explosion. They arrived at Surabaya, on 6 January 1942 .

=== Sinking ===
On 16 February, Van Nes was sent to Belitung, where she had to rendez-vous with the KPM ship SS Sloet van der Beele. Together they continued to Tanjung Pandan, to evacuate the Dutch population to Java. The ships arrived on 17 February, at 8:00, Sloet van der Beele took 400 soldiers and civilians on board in the port while Van Nes didn't enter the port to keep patrolling on open waters. Two hours after arriving the ships left Tanjung Pandan, for Batavia.

Less than 30 minutes after leaving Tanjung Pandan, Van Nes spotted an approaching airplane. This plane was identified as a Japanese scout plane. Van Nes opened fire with her 75 mm and 40 mm guns until the scout was out of range. After tracking both ships for another 30 minutes on high altitudes, outside of Van Nes' AA range, the scout left. Just after the scout plane left, Van Nes spotted a ship at a great distance which was identified as an enemy destroyer or cruiser. Van Nes accelerated to full power and opened fire at 14,000 meters (45,931.8 ft; 8.7 mi). Van Nes stopped firing her guns at 4,000 meters (13,123.4 ft; 2.5 mi), after firing 16 salvos and scoring multiple hits, because the ship was identified as the Dutch destroyer Van Ghent. Van Ghent was scuttled on 15 February, after beaching on a reef.

After the shooting at Van Ghent, Van Nes regrouped with Sloet van der Beele, which had accelerated to 14 knots (26 km/h; 16 mph), even though she was designed to reach a maximum of 12 knots (22 km/h; 14 mph). At 13:00, Van Nes spotted two Japanese groups of ten bombers each. Van Nes opened fire with her AA guns but didn't score any hits. The Japanese dropped five bombs on Sloet van der Beele, of which one was a direct hit. Five minutes later she sank taking 249 people down with her while 203 people survived the attack. For two hours, Van Nes kept fighting with the Japanese planes dodging all the bombs. With a large group of planes appearing on the horizon the Japanese planes left. The relief on Van Nes was short as these planes weren't the British fighters they had been expecting, but more Japanese planes. Van Nes had suffered a few near misses before her commander sent the message 'attack continues, are slightly damaged' at 15:20. At 15:30, Van Nes suffered two direct hits; one on the stern and one amidships, causing the ship to break in two and sink. Of the 143 people on board, 68 went down with the ship, with others dying later due to their injuries or in Japanese concentration camps.

Plan from 1930 of HNLMS Banckert and HNLMS Van Nes

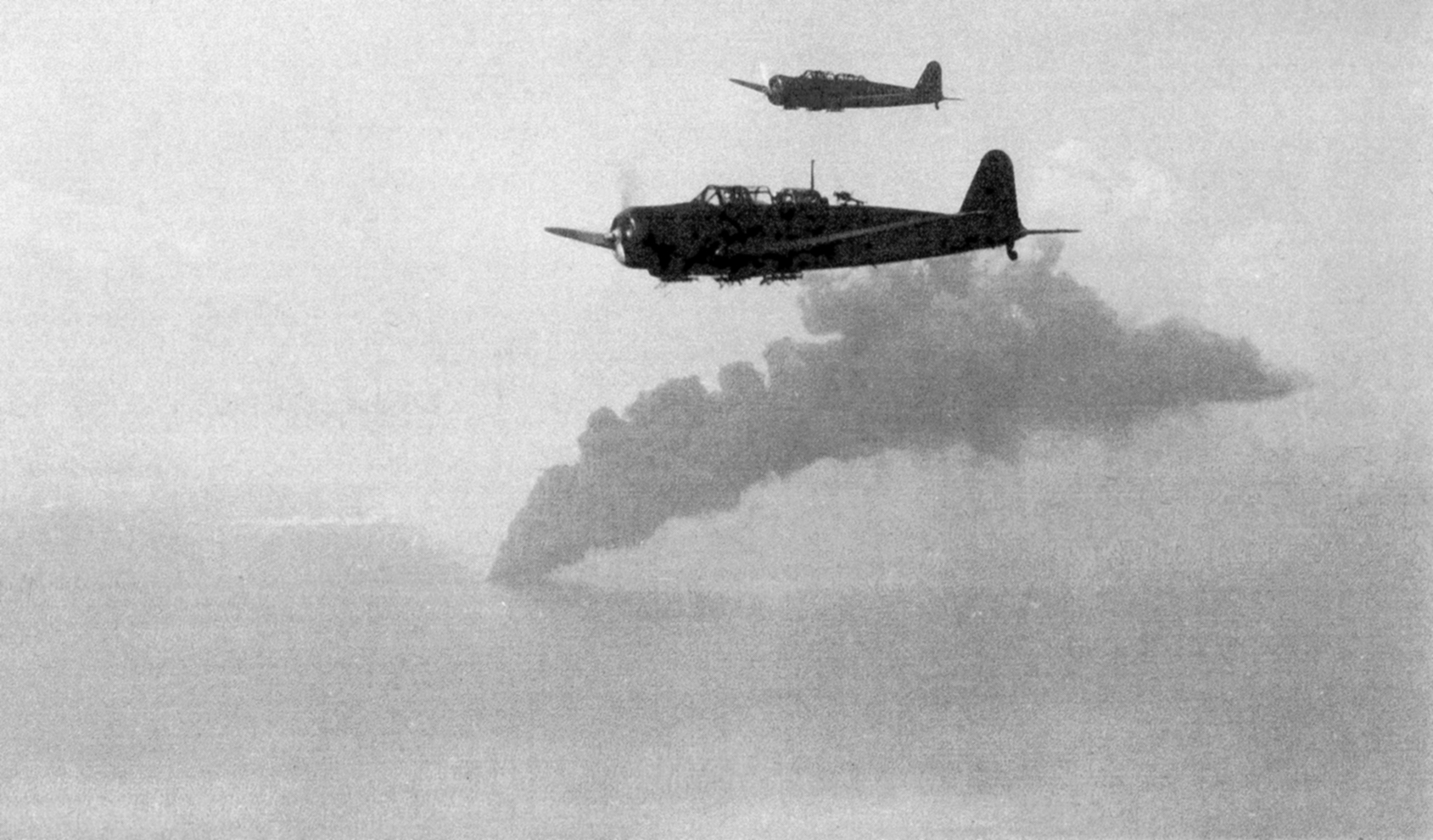
Smoke coming from the sinking Van Nes, with two Japanese Nakajima B5N torpedo bombers in the foreground

The Japanese planes belonged to the Ryūjō. If the planes wouldn't be enough to take out Van Nes the Japanese had heavy cruiser Chōkai and destroyers Shirakumo and Isonami ready to engage her before she could have reached her destination.

=== Rescue operation ===
On the morning of 19 February, a scout plane reported floating survivors 100 miles (160 km) from Tanjung Priok. The scout couldn't land to pick up survivors due to sea conditions. At 12:15, a British destroyer was ordered out of Priok, at full speed to the location reported by the scout plane, but returned at 19:00, without sighting any survivor or wreckage.

The Marine Luchtvaart Dienst was ordered to rescue as many survivors as possible with their seaplanes when the sun came up at 20 February. The minesweeper Ceram was sent out to rescue survivors as well, but contact with the minesweeper was lost and thus she was considered lost. Before sending out more sea planes became impossible, due to an increasing number of attacks on Tanjung Priok, 226 survivors were rescued.
