= HNLMS Witte de With (1928) =

Dutch ship

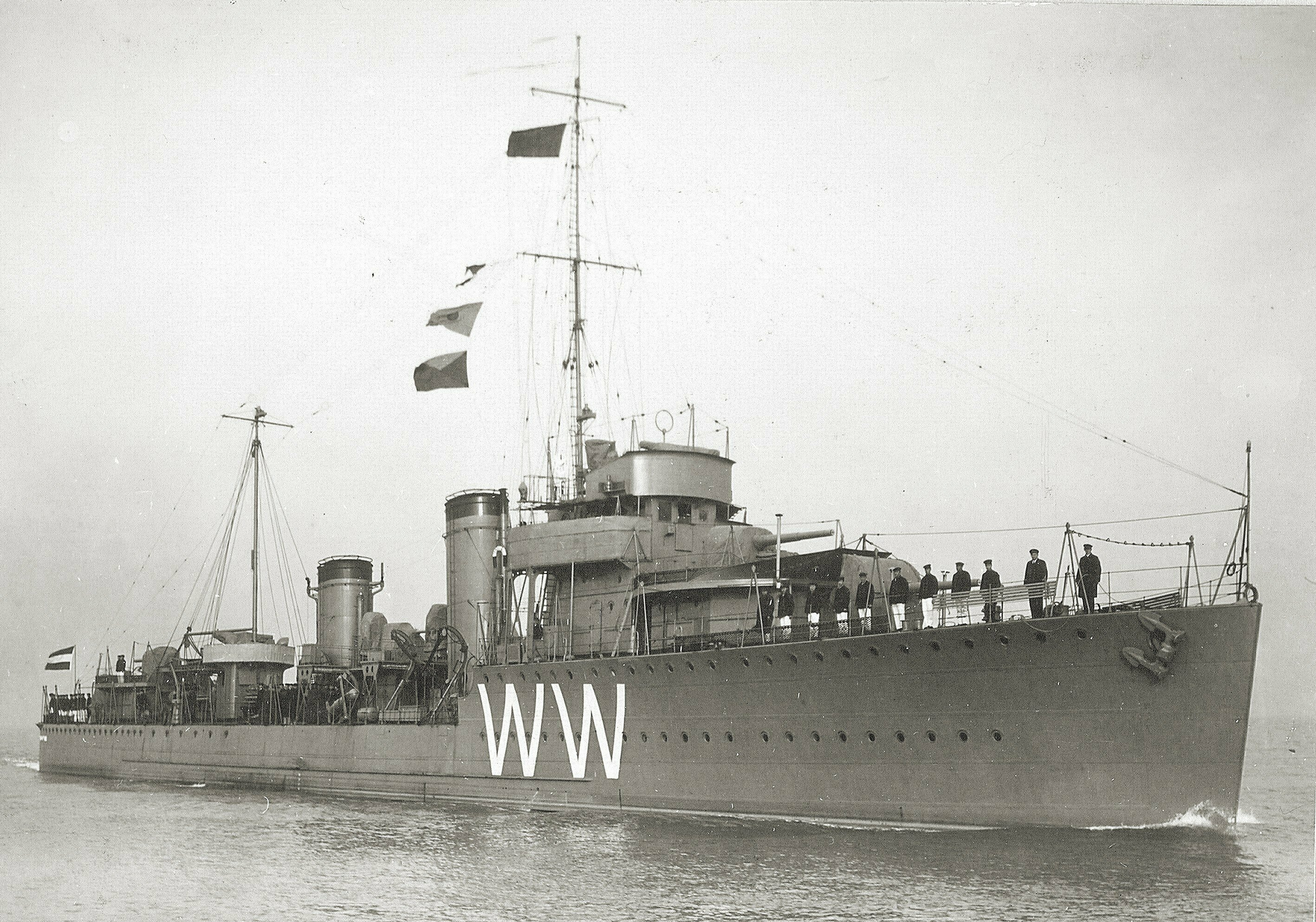
- HNLMS Witte de With

History

Netherlands
- Name: Witte de With
- Namesake: Witte Corneliszoon de With
- Builder: Fijenoord
- Laid down: 28 May 1927
- Launched: 11 September 1928
- Commissioned: 20 February 1930
- Fate: Scuttled, 2 March 1942

General characteristics
- Class & type: Admiralen-class destroyer
- Displacement: 1,316 long tons (1,337 t) (standard)
- Length: 98.15 m (322 ft 0 in)
- Beam: 9.53 m (31 ft 3 in)
- Draft: 2.97 m (9 ft 9 in)
- Installed power: 3 × Yarrow type boilers; 31,000 shp (23,000 kW)
- Propulsion: 2 × shafts, 2 × geared turbines
- Speed: 36 knots (67 km/h; 41 mph)
- Range: 3,200 nmi (5,900 km; 3,700 mi) at 15 knots (28 km/h; 17 mph)
- Complement: 143
- Armament: 4 × single 120 mm (4.7 in) guns; 1 × single 75 mm (3 in) AA gun; 4 × single 40 mm (1.6 in) AA guns; 4 × single 12.7 mm (0.50 in) guns; 2 × triple 533 mm (21 in) torpedo tubes
- Aircraft carried: 1 × Fokker C.VII-W floatplane
- Aviation facilities: crane

HNLMS Witte de With (Dutch: Hr.Ms. Witte de With) was an Admiralen-class destroyer built for the Royal Netherlands Navy during the 1920s. Completed in 1930, the ship served during the early stages of the Pacific War, participating in the Battle of the Java Sea in early 1942. After being damaged in an airstrike, she was scuttled in March 1942 to prevent her capture by the Japanese.

== Design and description ==
The Admiralen-class ships were derived from the design of the destroyer Ambuscade, an experimental British ship designed after the First World War. The ships had an overall length of 98.15 meters (322 ft), a beam of 9.53 meters (31 ft 3 in), and a draft of 2.97 meters (9 ft 9 in). Van Galen was one of the second batch of the Admiralens which differed slightly in minor details. They displaced 1,310 metric tons (1,290 long tons) at standard displacement while the second-batch ships were 30 long tons (30 t) heavier at full load at 1,640 metric tons (1,610 long tons). Their crew consisted of 143 men.

The Admiralens were powered by two geared Parsons steam turbines, each driving one propeller shaft using steam provided by three Yarrow boilers. The turbines were designed to produce 31,000 shaft horsepower (23,000 kW) which was intended give the ships a speed of 36 knots (67 km/h; 41 mph). One of the differences from the first-batch ships was that the second-batch ships carried additional fuel oil which gave them an extra 100 nautical miles (190 km; 120 mi) of range, for a total of 3,300 nautical miles (6,100 km; 3,800 mi) at 15 knots (28 km/h; 17 mph).

The main armament of the Admiralen-class ships consisted of four 120-millimeter (4.7 in) Mk 5 guns in single mounts, one superfiring pair fore and aft of the superstructure. The guns were designated 'A', 'B', 'X' and 'Y' from front to rear and only 'A' and 'Y' were fitted with gun shields. The second-batch ships had only a single 75-millimeter (3 in) anti-aircraft (AA) gun that was positioned between the funnels. Rather than the additional 75 mm AA gun of the first-batch ships, they had four 40-millimeter (1.6 in) Bofors AA guns; these were on single mounts amidships. All of the Admiralens were equipped with two rotating, triple mounts for 533-millimeter (21 in) torpedo tubes. They were able to carry a Fokker C.VII-W floatplane that had to be hoisted off the ship to take off. While the first batch of Admiralens were fitted to lay mines, the second-batch ships could be equipped with minesweeping gear.

== Construction and career ==
The ship was laid down on 28 May 1927 at the Feijenoord shipyard in Rotterdam and launched on 11 September 1928. The ship was commissioned on 20 February 1930.

When the Pacific War began on 8 December 1941, Witte de With was in reserve, prepared to begin an overhaul. After her sister ship Van Ghent ran aground and had to be scuttled on 15 February 1942, her entire crew was transferred to Witte de With. The ship took part in the Battle of the Java Sea on 27 February. The British heavy cruiser HMS Exeter had been damaged in the battle and escorted back to Surabaya, Java, by Witte de With. A few days later the ship was attacked and damaged by Japanese planes on 1 March. The next day she was scuttled.

== Bibliography ==
- Cox, Jeffrey (2014). Rising Sun, Falling Skies: The Disastrous Java Sea Campaign of World War II. Osprey Publishing. ISBN 978-1-4728-1060-1.
- Mark, Chris (1997). Schepen van de Koninklijke Marine in W.O. II (in Dutch). De Alk. ISBN 90-6013-522-9.
- Roberts, John (1980). "The Netherlands". In Chesneau, Roger (ed.). Conway's All the World's Fighting Ships 1922–1946. Conway Maritime Press. pp. 385–396. ISBN 0-85177-146-7.
- Whitley, M. J. (2000). Destroyers of World War Two: An International Encyclopedia. Cassell & Co. ISBN 1-85409-521-8.
- van Willigenburg, Henk (2010). Dutch Warships of World War II. Lanasta. ISBN 978-90-8616-318-2.
