= Battle of Makassar Strait =

1942 naval battle on the Pacific campaign of WWII

Coordinates: 7°30′S 115°30′E

- Part of World War II, Pacific War
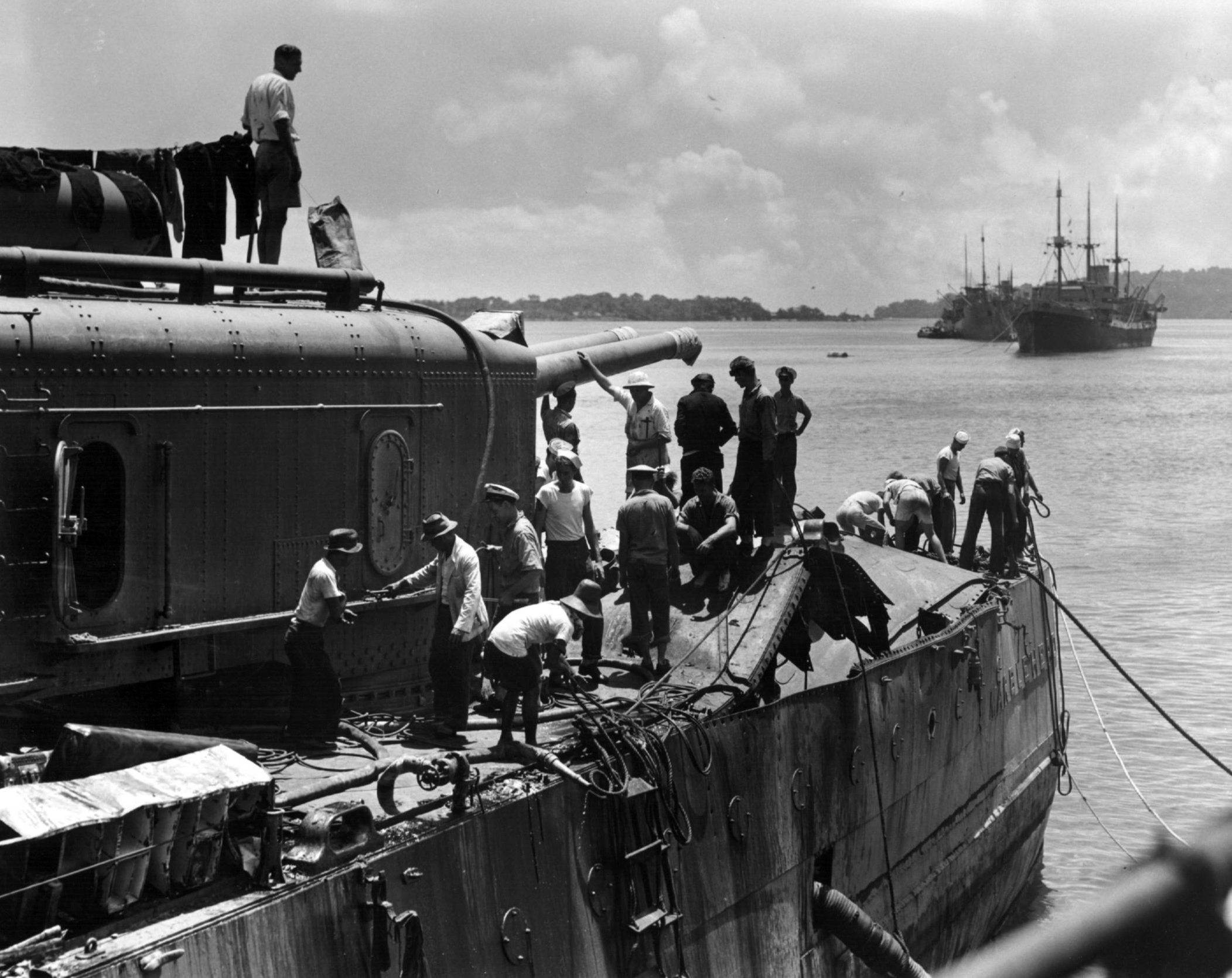
- USS Marblehead in February 1942, showing bomb damage received in the battle
Date	4 February 1942
Location	Java Sea, Bali Sea (Dutch East Indies)
Result	Japanese victory

Belligerents
Netherlands; United States	(Empire of Japan) Japan

Commanders and leaders
Karel Doorman	(Empire of Japan) Nishizō Tsukahara

Strength
4 cruisers 7 destroyers	37–45 planes (Allied estimate); 60 land based bombers (Japanese reports)

Casualties and losses
70 sailors killed 2 cruisers damaged	4+ planes destroyed

The Battle of Makassar Strait, also known as the Action of Madura Strait, the Action North of Lombok Strait and the Battle of the Flores Sea, was a naval battle of the Pacific theater of World War II. An American-British-Dutch-Australian (ABDA) fleet—under Schout-bij-nacht (Rear Admiral) Karel Doorman—was on its way to intercept a Japanese invasion convoy reported as bound for Surabaya (its destination was actually Makassar), when it was attacked by 36 Mitsubishi G4M1 "Betty" and 24 Mitsubishi G3M2 "Nell" medium bombers, which forced the fleet to retreat.

The battle occurred on 4 February 1942 in the Bali Sea, in south of the Kangean Islands. This battle should not be confused with the Battle of Balikpapan, which occurred over a week earlier on 24 January 1942, which is also sometimes referred to as the "Battle of Makassar Strait".

== Background ==
At the end of January, Japanese forces had conquered the north and west coast of Borneo and large parts of Maluku (Moluccas). On Borneo's east coast, Japanese forces occupied the oil facilities and ports of Balikpapan and Tarakan, and on Celebes the cities of Menado and Kendari had also fallen. To gain full control of Makassar Strait, the Japanese needed to capture the cities of Makassar and Banjarmasin.

On 1 February, Allied commanders received word from a reconnaissance plane: at Balikpapan, a Japanese invasion force—consisting of 20 troop transport ships, three cruisers and 10 destroyers—was preparing to sail. On 2 February, Admiral Thomas C. Hart, Vice-Admiraal (Vice Admiral) Conrad Helfrich, Rear Admiral William A. Glassford and (Commodore) John Collins, RAN met at Palembang; Helfrich's suggestion that a strike force be formed was approved. It was formed the following day under Schout-bij-nacht (Rear Admiral) Karel Doorman, and began taking on supplies at the Gili Islands, northwest of Lombok.

The ABDA force consisted of four cruisers (HNLMS De Ruyter, which was the flagship, Tromp and USS Houston, and Marblehead) escorted by seven destroyers (HNLMS Banckert, Piet Hein, Van Ghent, USS Barker, Bulmer, John D. Edwards, and Stewart).

== Battle ==
On the morning of 3 February, the ABDA combined strike force was being refueled by the Pecos in Bounder Roads, when they were spotted by seven Japanese bombers. Though they circled several times, the Japanese bombers did not attack the ABDA ships as they dispersed into open water, but instead continued on with their planned attack of Surabaya. Yet, Doorman's element of surprise was lost, a disadvantage coupled with his lack of fighter cover.

On 4 February, at midnight, the Doorman strike force sailed east from Bounder Roads towards the south of the Kangean Islands before turning north into the Java Sea. At 9:35 AM, Doorman was told to expect an attack from 36 Japanese bombers spotted taking off from Kendari II Airfield. The attack began at 9:49 while Doorman's ships were in Bali Sea 20 miles south of Kangean. The Japanese concentrated their attack on A.G. Robinson's Marblehead and Albert H. Rooks' Houston. At 10:27, Marblehead was straddled with six high explosive bombs, killing 15, wounding 84, causing severe flooding, destroying the steering room, and jamming the rudder hard to port. Marblehead listed 10 degrees to starboard as it circled doing 25 knots.

Houston was initially successfully in evading several bombs until a delayed fuse bomb penetrated the main deck near the Turret Number 3. The blast instantly killed 48, and wounded an additional 20. Quick action prevented the resultant fire from reaching the aft magazine, though the turret was no longer operational.

At 12:25, Doorman, in order to avoid further air attacks, ordered his ships south through the Lombok Strait and into the Indian Ocean. On 5 February, Houston and Tromp entered Tjilatjap, followed by Marblehead the day after.

== Aftermath ==
At Tjilatjap, On 7 February, Marblehead's hull was repaired over the next three days, when the forward half of the ship was placed in drydock. On 13 February, steering by her engines, she sailed for Ceylon, which she reached on 21 February. Without a drydocks able to accommodate her there, she continued onwards to South Africa, reaching the Brooklyn Navy Yard on 4 May. Though without a working aft turret, the Houston remained.

On 8 February, thinking Doorman had lost cruisers, the Japanese convoy anchored off Makassar.
