= Fokker C.VIII =

C.VIII
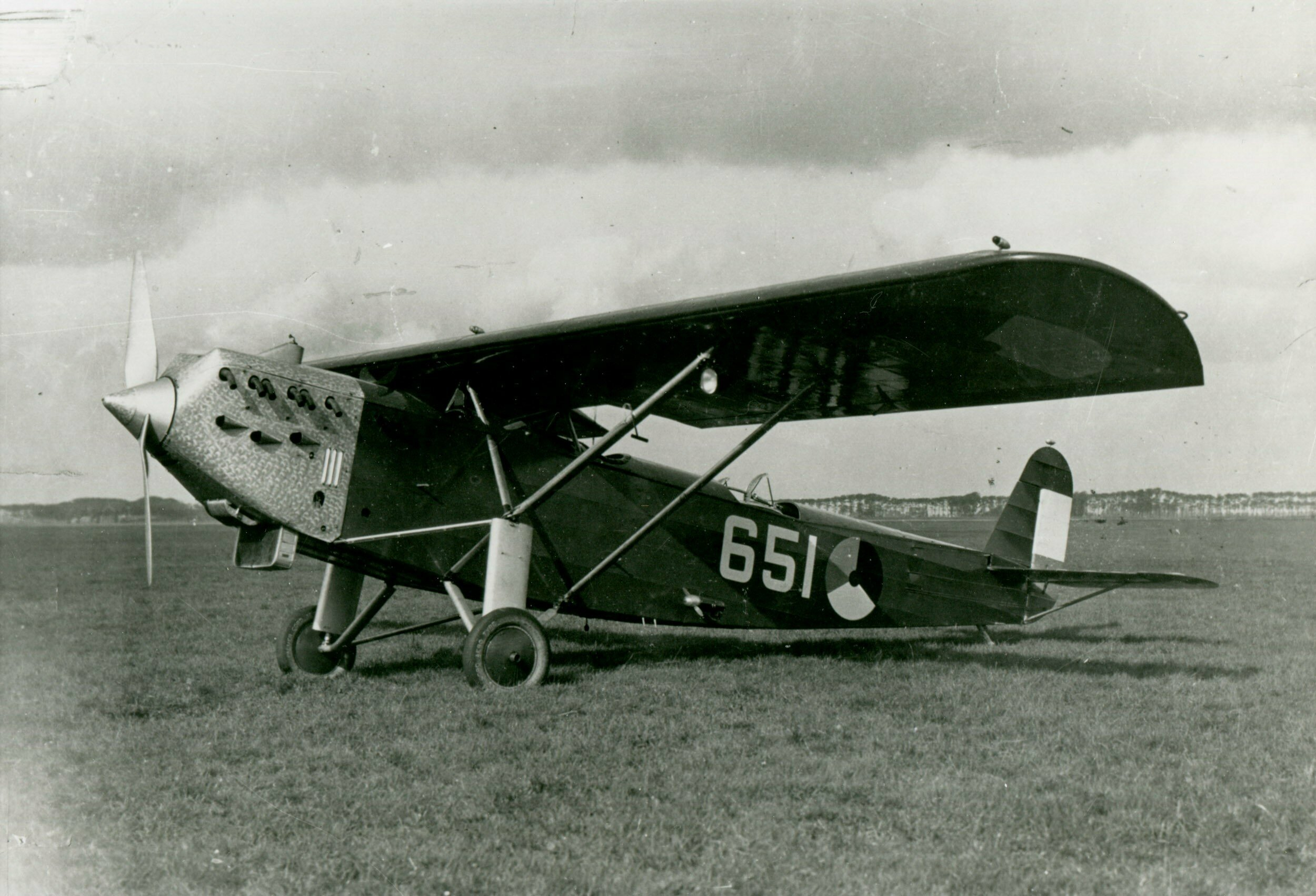

General information
- Type: Reconnaissance aircraft
- Manufacturer: Fokker
- Primary user: Royal Netherlands Navy
- Number built: 10

History
- First flight: 1928

The Fokker C.VIII was a reconnaissance aircraft built in the Netherlands in the late 1920s. Intended primarily for the photographic reconnaissance role, it was a larger machine than other Fokker reconnaissance types of the period, with space for a third crew member, who acted as camera operator. It was also Fokker's first aircraft of this type to be built as a monoplane, a parasol wing configuration. The construction, however, was in the familiar Fokker style with wooden wings covered with plywood and fabric, and a steel-tube fuselage, also fabric-covered.

A single prototype was built and after exhibition at the 1928 Paris Air Show was accepted into Royal Netherlands Army Aviation Group service, but no further orders for the type were placed. The following year, the Royal Netherlands Navy issued a requirement for a new reconnaissance seaplane, and Fokker submitted a revised version of the C.VIII. Slightly larger than its landplane counterpart, the C.VIII-W had a different engine, a new radiator arrangement, and twin pontoons as undercarriage, units similar to those used previously on the C.VII. The pontoon strutting incorporated a gap, allowing for the carriage of a torpedo under the fuselage for training purposes.

Nine aircraft were delivered to the Navy between June 1930 and July 1934, and all were still in service at the time of the German invasion in 1940. Four were lost to enemy action between 10 and 14 May, with the remaining five successfully evacuated to the UK on 30 May, whereupon they were scrapped.

== Variants ==
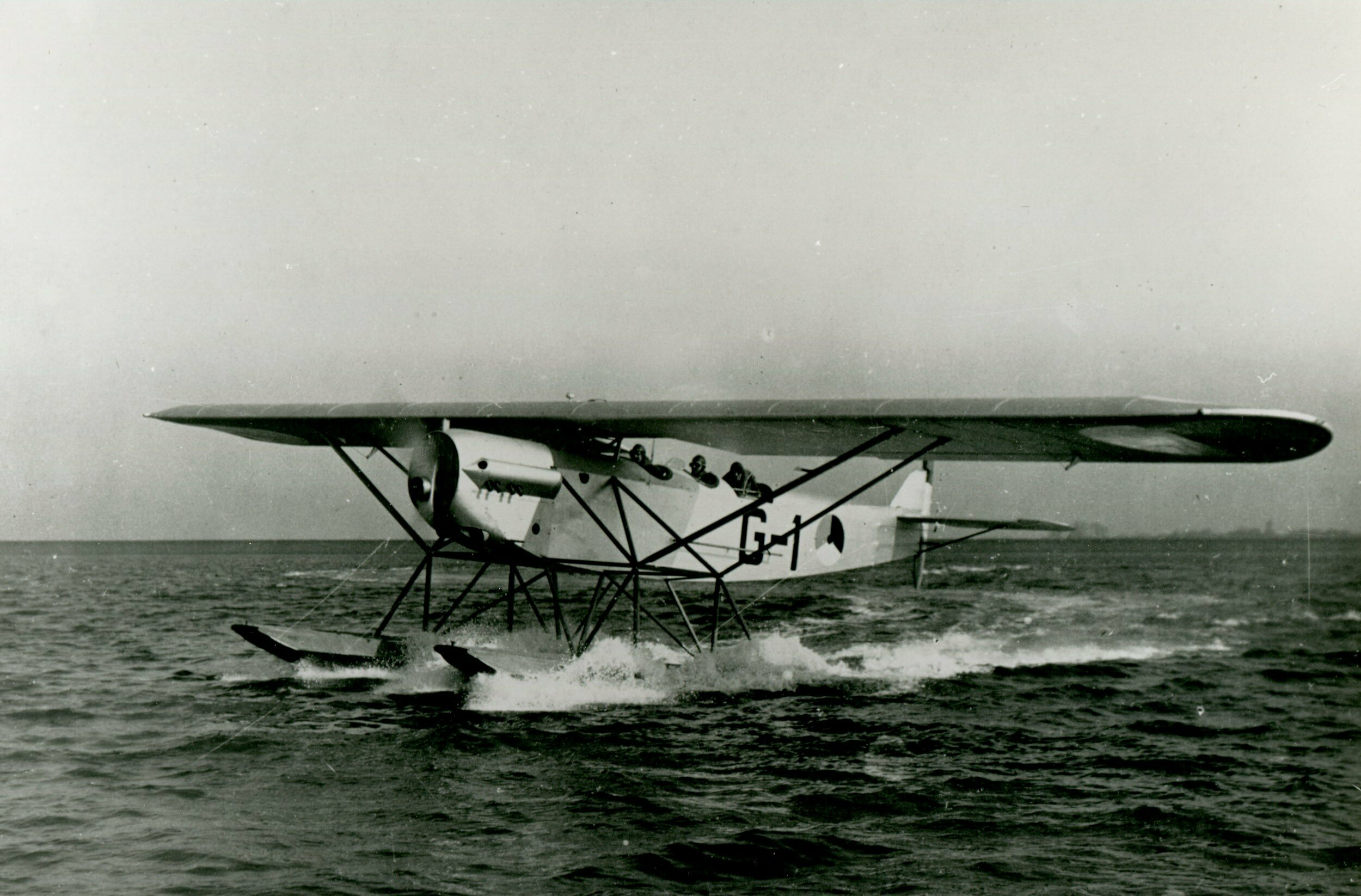
Fokker C.VIII-W, 1931

C.VIII
Landplane with Hispano-Suiza 12Lb engine (1 built)
C.VIII-W
Seaplane with Lorraine 12E Courlis engine (9 built)

== Operators ==
Netherlands

- Royal Netherlands Navy

== Specifications (C.VIII) ==
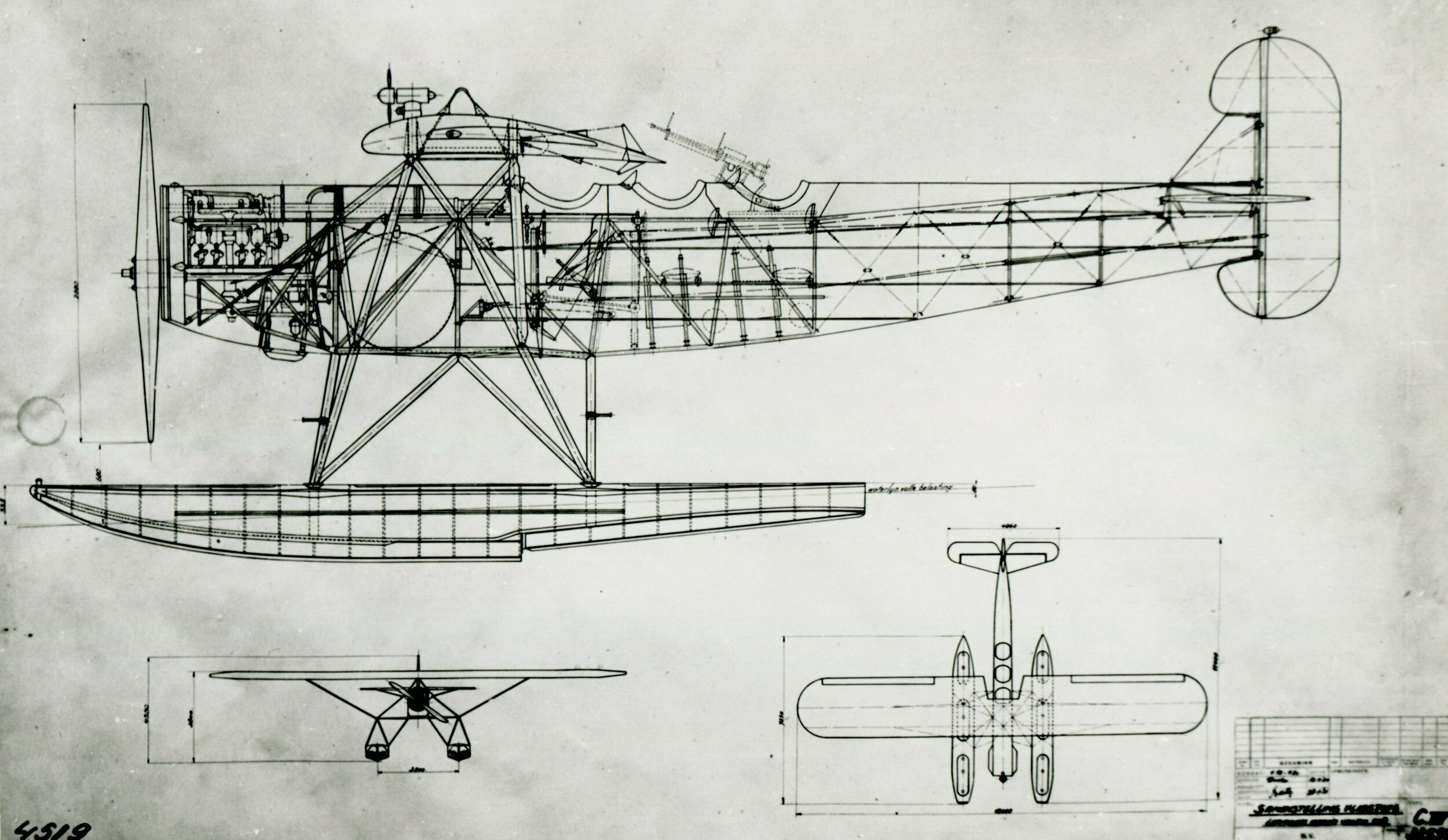

Data from Jane's all the World's Aircraft 1928

General characteristics

- Crew: 3 (Pilot, gunner, and camera operator)
- Length: 11.15 m (36 ft 7 in)
- Wingspan: 14.03 m (46 ft 0 in)
- Height: 3.15 m (10 ft 4 in)
- Wing area: 35 m^{2} (380 sq ft)
- Empty weight: 1,550 kg (3,417 lb)
- Gross weight: 2,400 kg (5,291 lb)
- Powerplant: 1 × Hispano-Suiza 12Lb V-12 water-cooled piston engine, 450 kW (600 hp)
- Propellers: 2-bladed metal fixed pitch propeller

Performance

- Maximum speed: 228 km/h (142 mph, 123 kn)
- Stall speed: 100 km/h (62 mph, 54 kn)
- Range: 650 km (400 mi, 350 nmi) at 187 km/h (116 mph; 101 kn)
- Service ceiling: 5,800 m (19,000 ft)
- Time to altitude: 2,000 m (6,600 ft) in 6 minutes 21 seconds: 5,000 m (16,000 ft) in 25 minutes 15 seconds
- Wing loading: 68 kg/m^{2} (14 lb/sq ft)
- Power/mass: 0.2081 kW/kg (0.1266 hp/lb)

Armament

- Guns:
  - 2 × rearward-firing trainable 7.9 mm (0.311 in) machine guns in observer's cockpit
  - 1 × rearward-firing trainable 7.9 mm (0.311 in) machine gun in ventral hatch
