= HNLMS Van Galen (1928) =

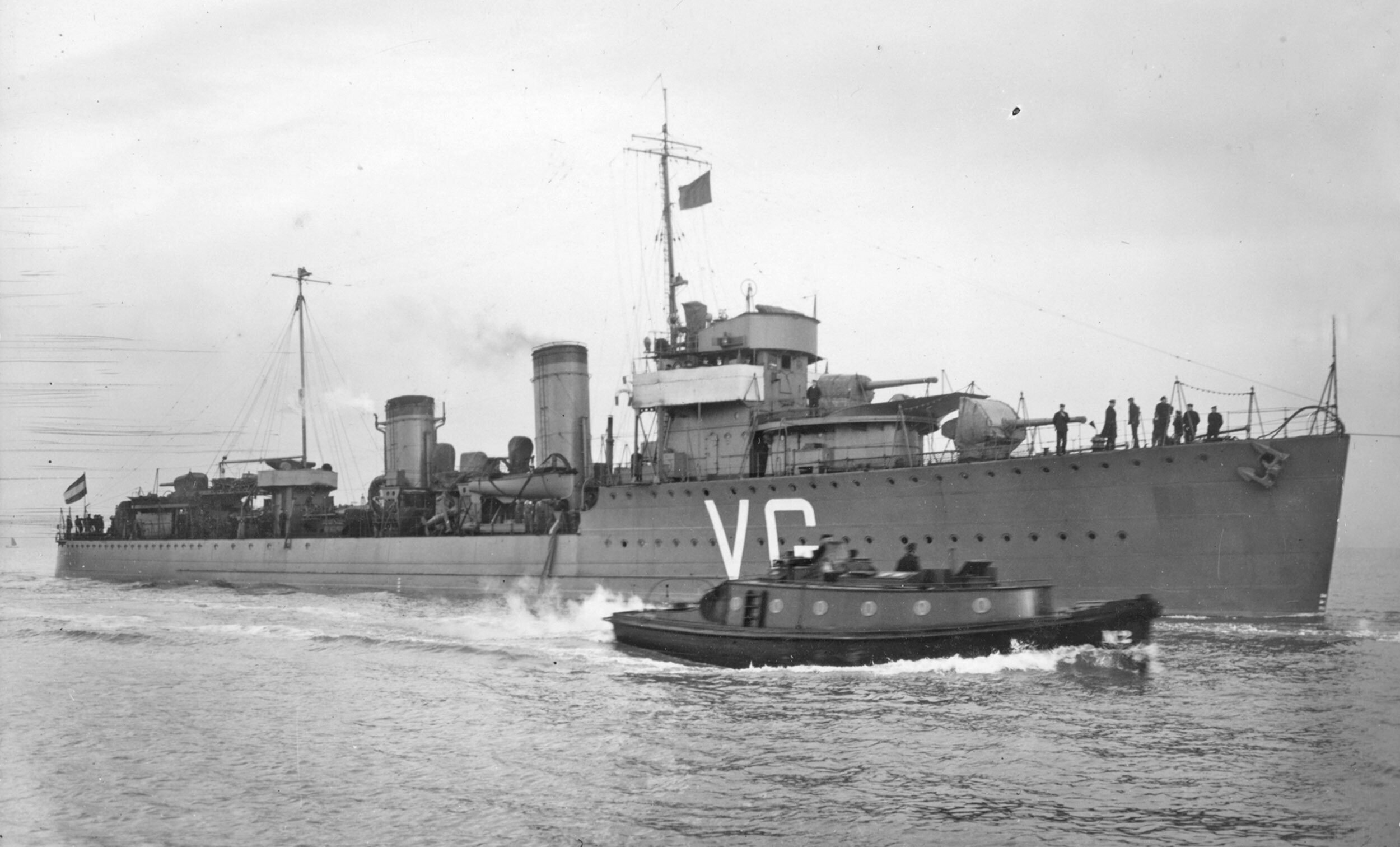
- HNLMS Van Galen

History

Netherlands
- Name: Van Galen
- Namesake: Johan van Galen
- Builder: Fijenoord
- Laid down: 28 May 1927
- Launched: 28 June 1928
- Commissioned: 22 October 1929
- Fate: Sunk, 10 May 1940

General characteristics
- Class & type: Admiralen-class destroyer
- Displacement: 1,316 long tons (1,337 t) (standard)
- Length: 98.15 m (322 ft 0 in)
- Beam: 9.53 m (31 ft 3 in)
- Draft: 2.97 m (9 ft 9 in)
- Installed power: 3 × Yarrow type boilers; 31,000 shp (23,000 kW)
- Propulsion: 2 × shafts, 2 × geared turbines
- Speed: 36 knots (67 km/h; 41 mph)
- Range: 3,200 nmi (5,900 km; 3,700 mi) at 15 knots (28 km/h; 17 mph)
- Complement: 143
- Armament: 4 × single 120 mm (4.7 in) guns; 1 × single 75 mm (3 in) AA gun; 4 × single 40 mm (1.6 in) AA guns; 4 × single 12.7 mm (0.50 in) guns; 2 × triple 533 mm (21 in) torpedo tubes
- Aircraft carried: 1 × Fokker C.VII-W floatplane
- Aviation facilities: crane

HNLMS Van Galen (Dutch: Hr.Ms. Van Galen) was a Admiralen-class destroyer built for the Royal Netherlands Navy during the 1920s. Completed in 1928, the ship played a minor role in the Second World War. When Germany invaded the Netherlands in May 1940 she was soon sunk by German aircraft. Her wreck was salvaged in 1941 and subsequently scrapped.

== Design and description ==
The Admiralen-class ships were derived from the design of the destroyer Ambuscade, an experimental British ship designed after the First World War. The ships had an overall length of 98.15 meters (322 ft), a beam of 9.53 meters (31 ft 3 in), and a draft of 2.97 meters (9 ft 9 in). Van Galen was one of the second batch of the Admiralens which differed slightly in minor details. They displaced 1,310 metric tons (1,290 long tons) at standard displacement while the second-batch ships were 30 long tons (30 t) heavier at full load at 1,640 metric tons (1,610 long tons). Their crew consisted of 143 men.

The Admiralens were powered by two geared Parsons steam turbines, each driving one propeller shaft using steam provided by three Yarrow boilers. The turbines were designed to produce 31,000 shaft horsepower (23,000 kW) which was intended give the ships a speed of 36 knots (67 km/h; 41 mph). One of the differences from the first-batch ships was that the second-batch ships carried additional fuel oil which gave them an extra 100 nautical miles (190 km; 120 mi) of range, for a total of 3,300 nautical miles (6,100 km; 3,800 mi) at 15 knots (28 km/h; 17 mph).

The main armament of the Admiralen-class ships consisted of four 120-millimeter (4.7 in) Mk 5 guns in single mounts, one superfiring pair fore and aft of the superstructure. The guns were designated 'A', 'B', 'X' and 'Y' from front to rear and only 'A' and 'Y' were fitted with gun shields. The second-batch ships had only a single 75-millimeter (3 in) anti-aircraft (AA) gun that was positioned between the funnels. Rather than the additional 75 mm AA gun of the first-batch ships, they had four 40-millimeter (1.6 in) AA guns; these were on single mounts amidships. All of the Admiralens were equipped with two rotating, triple mounts for 533-millimeter (21 in) torpedo tubes. They were able to carry a Fokker C.VII-W floatplane that had to be hoisted off the ship to take off. While the first batch of Admiralens were fitted to lay mines, the second-batch ships could be equipped with minesweeping gear.

== Construction and career ==
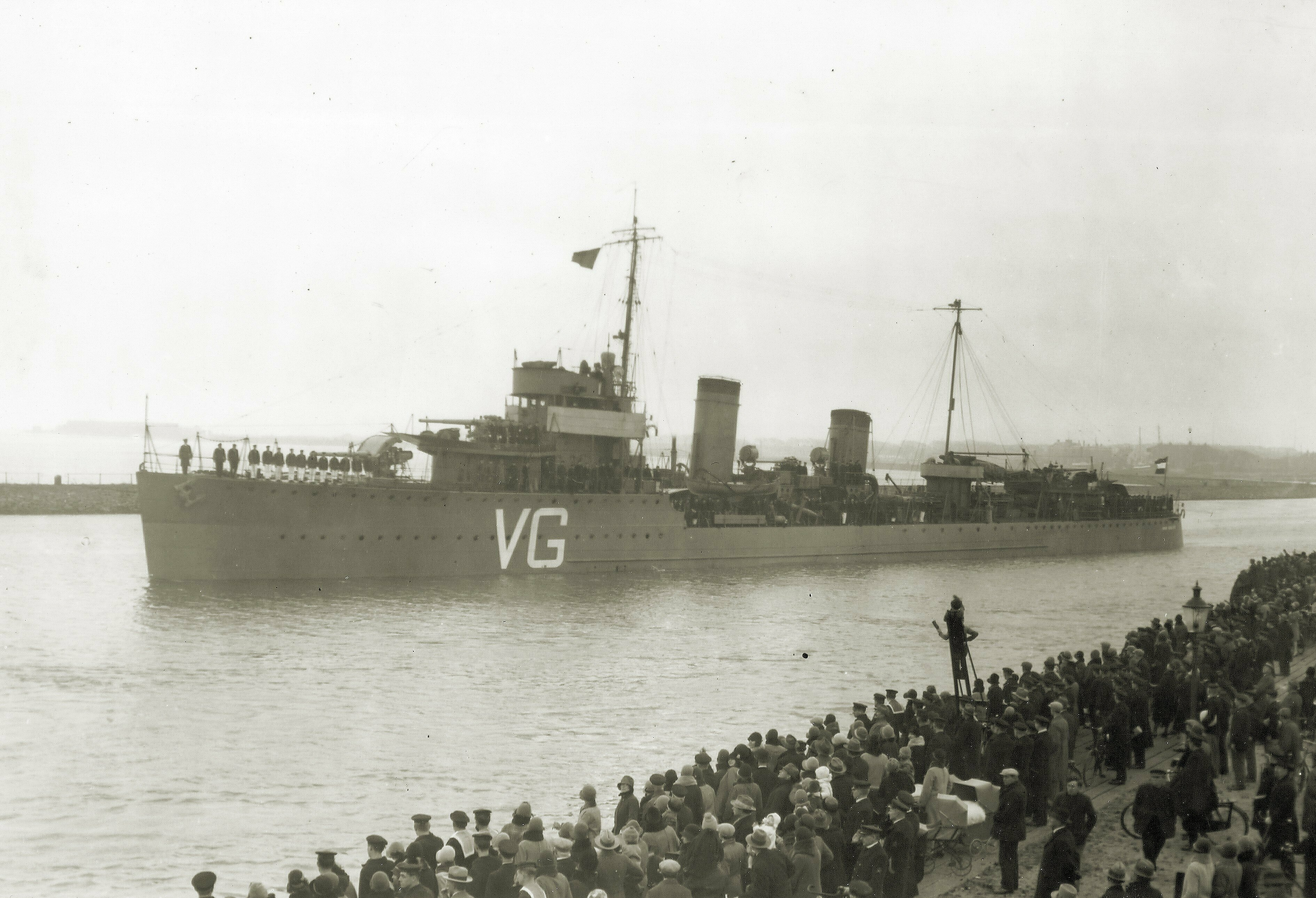
Van Galen in 1930

Van Galen was laid down on 28 May 1927 at the Fijenoord shipyard in Rotterdam, and launched on 28 June 1928. The ship was commissioned on 22 October 1929.

She was the only destroyer in home waters when Germany invaded on 10 May. The Germans had captured the airfield at Waalhaven in Rotterdam, and Van Galen was ordered to bombard the airfield. German aircraft attacked her while underway in the Nieuwe Waterweg and she sank near Merwehaven. The Germans raised the wreck on 24 October 1941, but the ship was in such bad shape that she was scrapped in Hendrik-Ido-Ambacht.

== Bibliography ==
- Mark, Chris (1997). Schepen van de Koninklijke Marine in W.O. II (in Dutch). De Alk. ISBN 90-6013-522-9.
- Roberts, John (1980). "The Netherlands". In Chesneau, Roger (ed.). Conway's All the World's Fighting Ships 1922–1946. Conway Maritime Press. pp. 385–396. ISBN 0-85177-146-7.
- Whitley, M. J. (2000). Destroyers of World War Two: An International Encyclopedia. Cassell & Co. ISBN 1-85409-521-8.
- van Willigenburg, Henk (2010). Dutch Warships of World War II. Lanasta. ISBN 978-90-8616-318-2.
