= HNLMS Banckert (1929) =

1929 Admiralen-class destroyer

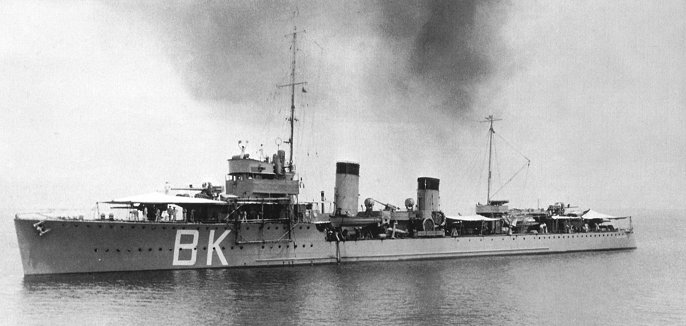
- HNLMS Banckert in 1934

History

Netherlands
- Name: Banckert
- Namesake: Adriaen Banckert
- Builder: RotterdamBurgerhout's Scheepswerf en Machinefabriek, Rotterdam
- Laid down: 15 August 1928
- Launched: 14 November 1929
- Commissioned: 14 November 1930
- Fate: Scuttled at Surabaya, 2 March 1942; later raised and repaired by Imperial Japanese Navy
- Reacquired: 23 October 1945
- Stricken: 5 March 1947
- Fate: Sunk as target ship, 1949

Japan
- Name: Patrol Boat No. 106
- Builder: No. 103 Repair Facility at Cavite Naval Base
- Acquired: 20 March 1944 (raised)
- Commissioned: 20 April 1944
- Fate: Surrendered, 23 October 1945

General characteristics
- Class & type: Admiralen-class destroyer
- Displacement: 1,316 long tons (1,337 t) (standard)
- Length: 98.15 m (322 ft 0 in)
- Beam: 9.53 m (31 ft 3 in)
- Draft: 2.97 m (9 ft 9 in)
- Installed power: 3 × Yarrow type boilers; 31,000 shp (23,000 kW)
- Propulsion: 2 × shafts, 2 × geared turbines
- Speed: 36 knots (67 km/h; 41 mph)
- Range: 3,200 nmi (5,900 km; 3,700 mi) at 15 knots (28 km/h; 17 mph)
- Complement: 143
- Armament: 4 × single 120 mm (4.7 in) guns; 1 × single 75 mm (3 in) AA gun; 4 × single 40 mm (1.6 in) AA guns; 4 × single 12.7 mm (0.50 in) guns; 2 × triple 533 mm (21 in) torpedo tubes
- Aircraft carried: 1 × Fokker C.VII-W floatplane
- Aviation facilities: crane

HNLMS Banckert (Dutch: Hr.Ms. Banckert) was a Admiralen-class destroyer built for the Royal Netherlands Navy during the 1920s. Completed in 1930, the ship served during World War II. She was in the Dutch East Indies when the Japanese attacked in December 1941. Banckert was damaged multiple times by Japanese aircraft and ultimately had to be scuttled in March 1942 to prevent her capture. She was refloated by the Japanese, who unsuccessfully attempted to repair her. The ship was recaptured at the end of the war in 1945 and was sunk as a target in 1949.

== Design and description ==
The Admiralen-class ships were derived from the design of the destroyer Ambuscade, an experimental British ship designed after the First World War. The ships had an overall length of 98.15 meters (322 ft), a beam of 9.53 meters (31 ft 3 in), and a draft of 2.97 meters (9 ft 9 in). Van Galen was one of the second batch of the Admiralens which differed slightly in minor details. They displaced 1,310 metric tons (1,290 long tons) at standard displacement while the second-batch ships were 30 long tons (30 t) heavier at full load at 1,640 metric tons (1,610 long tons). Their crew consisted of 143 men.

The Admiralens were powered by two geared Parsons steam turbines, each driving one propeller shaft using steam provided by three Yarrow boilers. The turbines were designed to produce 31,000 shaft horsepower (23,000 kW) which was intended give the ships a speed of 36 knots (67 km/h; 41 mph). One of the differences from the first-batch ships was that the second-batch ships carried additional fuel oil which gave them an extra 100 nautical miles (190 km; 120 mi) of range, for a total of 3,300 nautical miles (6,100 km; 3,800 mi) at 15 knots (28 km/h; 17 mph).

The main armament of the Admiralen-class ships consisted of four 120-millimeter (4.7 in) Mk 5 guns in single mounts, one superfiring pair fore and aft of the superstructure. The guns were designated 'A', 'B', 'X' and 'Y' from front to rear and only 'A' and 'Y' were fitted with gun shields. The second-batch ships had only a single 75-millimeter (3 in) anti-aircraft (AA) gun that was positioned between the funnels. Rather than the additional 75 mm AA gun of the first-batch ships, they had four 40-millimeter (1.6 in) Bofors AA guns; these were on single mounts amidships. All of the Admiralens were equipped with two rotating, triple mounts for 533-millimeter (21 in) torpedo tubes. They were able to carry a Fokker C.VII-W floatplane that had to be hoisted off the ship to take off. While the first batch of Admiralens were fitted to lay mines, the second-batch ships could be equipped with minesweeping gear.

== Construction and career ==
Plan from 1930 of HNLMS Banckert and HNLMS Van Nes

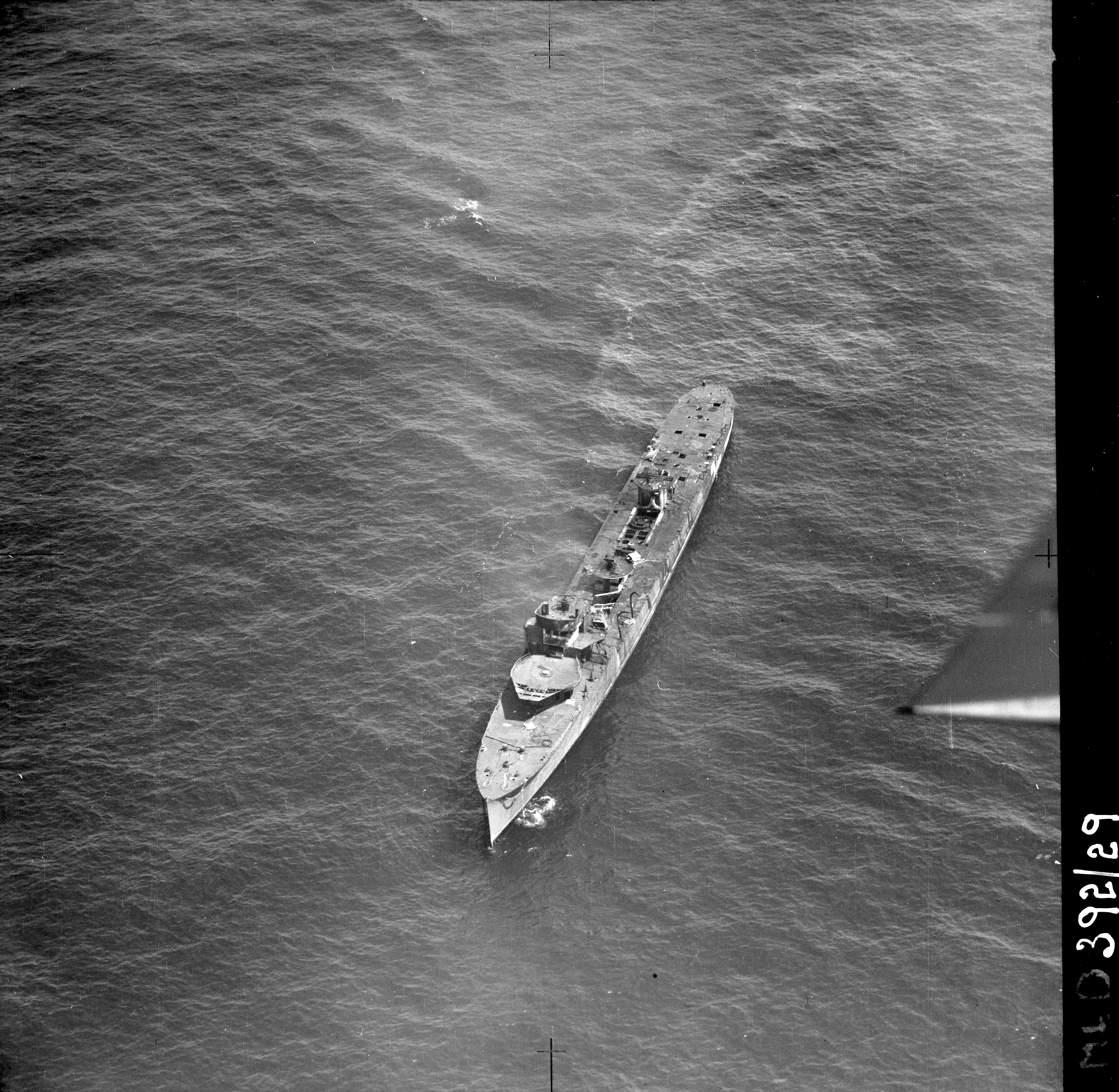
Banckert as a target ship in Madura Strait, 1949

Banckert was laid down at the Burgerhout's Scheepswerf en Machinefabriek in Rotterdam on 15 August 1928, launched on 14 November 1929, and commissioned on 14 November 1930.

On 14 February 1942, Banckert's sister, Van Ghent, got stuck on a reef and her crew was forced to set the ship on fire. The crew was later taken on board Banckert. Between 24 and 28 February, the ship was attacked by Japanese planes while docked at Port of Tanjung Perak and damaged to the point that she had to be scuttled on 2 March of that year. On 20 March 1944, the Japanese decided to raise the ship and the repair her at Cavite Naval Base, and on 20 April 1944 they reclassified her as Patrol Boat No. 106. However, the repairs were never finished, and after the war Banckert was reacquired and eventually expended as a target ship in the Madura Strait in September 1949.

== Bibliography ==
- Cox, Jeffrey (2014). Rising Sun, Falling Skies: The Disastrous Java Sea Campaign of World War II. Osprey Publishing. ISBN 978-1-4728-1060-1.
- Mark, Chris (1997). Schepen van de Koninklijke Marine in W.O. II (in Dutch). De Alk. ISBN 90-6013-522-9.
- Roberts, John (1980). "The Netherlands". In Chesneau, Roger (ed.). Conway's All the World's Fighting Ships 1922–1946. Conway Maritime Press. pp. 385–396. ISBN 0-85177-146-7.
- Whitley, M. J. (2000). Destroyers of World War Two: An International Encyclopedia. Cassell & Co. ISBN 1-85409-521-8.
- van Willigenburg, Henk (2010). Dutch Warships of World War II. Lanasta. ISBN 978-90-8616-318-2.
