= HNLMS Tjerk Hiddes =

HNLMS Tjerk Hiddes (Dutch: Hr.Ms. or Zr.Ms. Tjerk Hiddes) may refer to following ships of the Royal Netherlands Navy:

- HNLMS Tjerk Hiddes (1939), a Gerard Callenburgh-class destroyer launched in 1939 and scuttled incomplete in 1940
- HNLMS Tjerk Hiddes (G16), a British N-class destroyer launched in 1941 as HMS Nonpareil but transferred to the Netherlands and renamed before completion in 1942. She was transferred to Indonesia and renamed RI Gadjah Mada in 1951 and scrapped in 1961.
- HNLMS Tjerk Hiddes (F804), a Van Speijk-class frigate
- HNLMS Tjerk Hiddes (F830), a Karel Doorman-class frigate launched in 1989. She was sold to Chile and renamed Almirante Riveros in 2007
