= HNLMS Van Ghent =

Admiralen-class destroyer

Coordinates: 3.08333°S 107.35°E

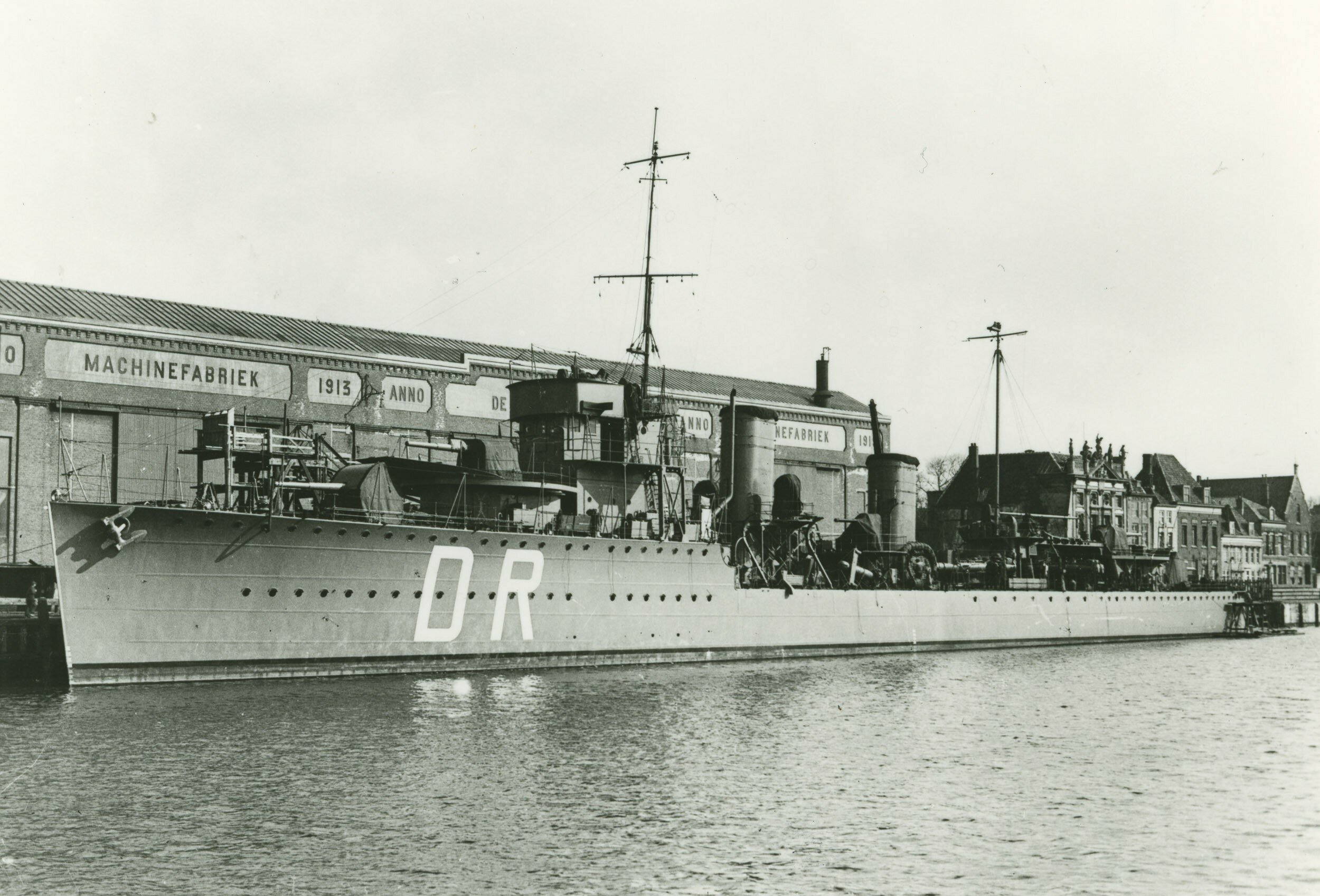
- HNLMS De Ruyter in the late 1920s

History
- Name: Van Ghent
- Namesake: Willem Joseph van Ghent
- Builder: Koninklijke Maatschappij De Schelde
- Laid down: 28 August 1925
- Launched: 23 October 1926
- Commissioned: 31 May 1928
- Renamed: Van Ghent, 1934
- Fate: Scuttled 15 February 1942

General characteristics
- Class & type: Admiralen-class destroyer
- Displacement: 1,310 long tons (1,331 t) standard
- Length: 98.15 m (322.0 ft) oa; 93.57 m (307.0 ft) lbp
- Beam: 9.45 m (31.0 ft)
- Draft: 3 m (9.8 ft)
- Installed power: 31,000 hp (23 MW)
- Propulsion: 3 × Yarrow boilers; 2 × turbines; 2 × shafts
- Speed: 36 knots (67 km/h; 41 mph)
- Range: 3,200 nmi (5,900 km; 3,700 mi) at 15 kn (28 km/h; 17 mph)
- Complement: 129
- Armament: 4 × 4.7 in (120 mm) guns (4×1); 2 × 3 in (76 mm) AA guns (2×1); 4 × .50 calibre machine guns; 6 × 21 in (533 mm) torpedo tubes (2×3); 24 × mines
- Aircraft carried: 1 × Fokker C.VII-W floatplane
- Aviation facilities: 1 × davit

HNLMS Van Ghent (Dutch: Hr.Ms. Van Ghent) (originally named De Ruyter) was an Admiralen-class destroyer built for the Royal Netherlands Navy in the 1920s. The destroyer served in the Netherlands East Indies but was wrecked after running aground in 1942.

== Development and design ==
During the early 20th century, the primary goal of the Royal Netherlands Navy was the defense of the resource-rich and economically vital Dutch East Indies. By the end of World War I, wartime advancements in marine engineering and naval architecture—particularly in submarines and aircraft—left the neutral Dutch Navy technologically behind its European counterparts. In the postwar period, the Navy planned for a rapid modernization and studied the equipment of other nations while designing a new class of destroyers.

Simultaneously, the British Royal Navy held a design competition for its first postwar destroyers. One of the designs, HMS Ambuscade, built by Thornycroft, impressed Dutch officials. The Netherlands subsequently adopted a modified version of this design for service in the East Indies, where Japan was increasingly viewed as the most significant threat. Compared to the British design, the Dutch version was slightly slower and had a reduced range in exchange for a more powerful anti-aircraft armament and the inclusion of a reconnaissance seaplane. The design became known as the Admiralen-class destroyer, as every ship was named after a Dutch 17th century admiral. The eight destroyers in the class were divided into two subgroups: the first four, including De Ruyter, were equipped for minelaying, while the latter four displaced slightly more and furnished with minesweeping equipment.

=== Characteristics ===
The ships' primary armament consisted of four single-mounted Bofors 12 cm (4.7 in) guns—two forward and two aft—with only two of the mounts protected with gun shields. Two 7.6 cm (3 in) guns mounted between the funnels and four 1.3 cm (.5 in) machine guns provided anti-aircraft defense. A distinctive feature of the class was a floatplane platform mounted above one of the two triple 53 cm (21 in) torpedo tube mounts. The aircraft, a Fokker C VII-W, was used for reconnaissance as the many islands in the Indonesian archipelago made locating enemy vessels difficult. The minelaying destroyers were 98.15 m (322.0 ft) long, had a beam of 9.45 m (31.0 ft), a draught of 3 m (9.8 ft), and a displacement of 1,310 long tons (1,331 t). They were propelled by three Yarrow boilers that produced 31,000 shaft horsepower (23,000 kilowatts) and a top speed of 36 knots (67 km/h; 41 mph) through two propellers. The ships could carry 24 mines and were manned by a crew of 129.

== History ==
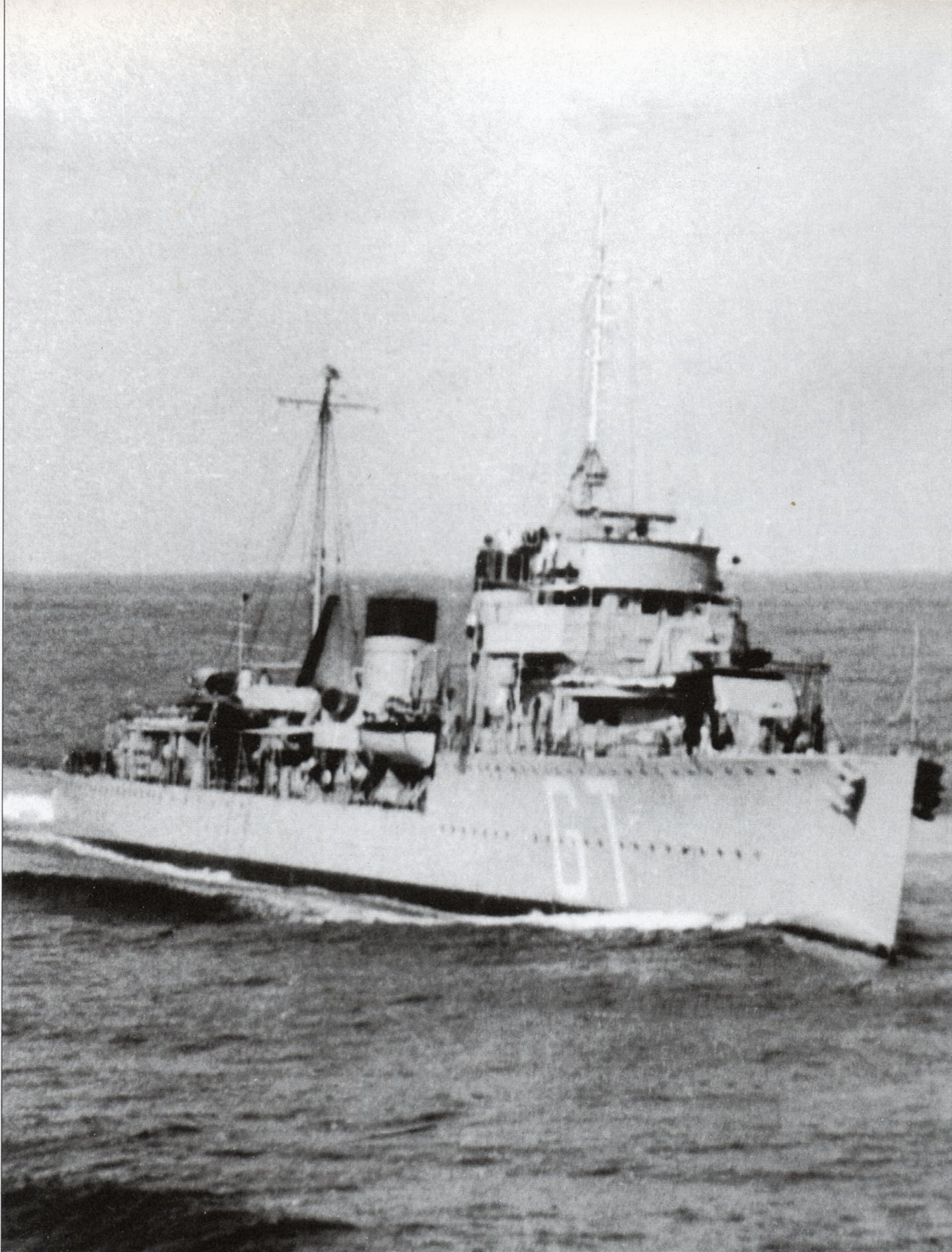
Van Ghent under her new name in 1934.

The destroyer was laid down on 28 August 1925 by Koninklijke Maatschappij De Schelde in Vlissingen and was launched on 13 October 1926. On 31 May 1928, she was commissioned and named De Ruyter, after the 17th century admiral of the same name.

On 29 July 1929, De Ruyter, her sister Evertsen, the cruiser Java, and the submarines K II and K VII, left Surabaya, and steamed to Tanjung Priok. At Tanjung Priok, the ships waited for the royal yacht, Maha Chakri, of the king of Siam, and the destroyer Phra Ruang. After this, the ships, without the submarines, visited Bangka, Belitung, Riau, Lingga Islands, Belawan, and Deli. On 28 August, they returned in Tanjung Priok. On 31 August, she participates in a fleet review at Tanjung Priok, held in honor of the Dutch Queen Wilhelmina of the Netherlands, who was born that day. Other ships that participated in the review where the destroyer Evertsen and the cruiser Java.

On 1 October 1934, the destroyer was renamed to Van Ghent, after Willem Joseph van Ghent, so that the old name could be used for the newly built light cruiser De Ruyter.

=== World War II ===
In 1940, she and her sister Kortenaer, guarded five German cargo ships. The ships were relieved by Java on 26 April 1940.

When war broke out in the Pacific in December 1941, Van Ghent was serving in the Netherlands East Indies as part of Rear Admiral Karel Doorman's command. She was involved in the salvage of the United States Army cargo ship USAT Liberty.

De Ruyter, along with several Dutch and U.S. cruisers and destroyers, took part in an unsuccessful attempt to attack a Japanese invasion convoy reportedly bound for Surabaya (which in actuality was heading to Makassar) on 3–4 February 1942. This battle became known as the Battle of Makassar Strait, with the Allied force being driven off with damage to several ships by Japanese air attacks before ever nearing the convoy. Doorman's forces attempted another sortie against another Japanese invasion convoy on 15 February 1942, and to locate them this time took his ships northwest through the Gaspar Strait, to the east of Bangka Island. While passing through the strait in poor visibility, Van Ghent struck a rock and stuck fast, forcing another Dutch destroyer to take off her crew. Deemed a wreck, Van Ghent was subsequently scuttled by the destroyer Banckert.
