= Fokker C.VII-W =

C.VII-W
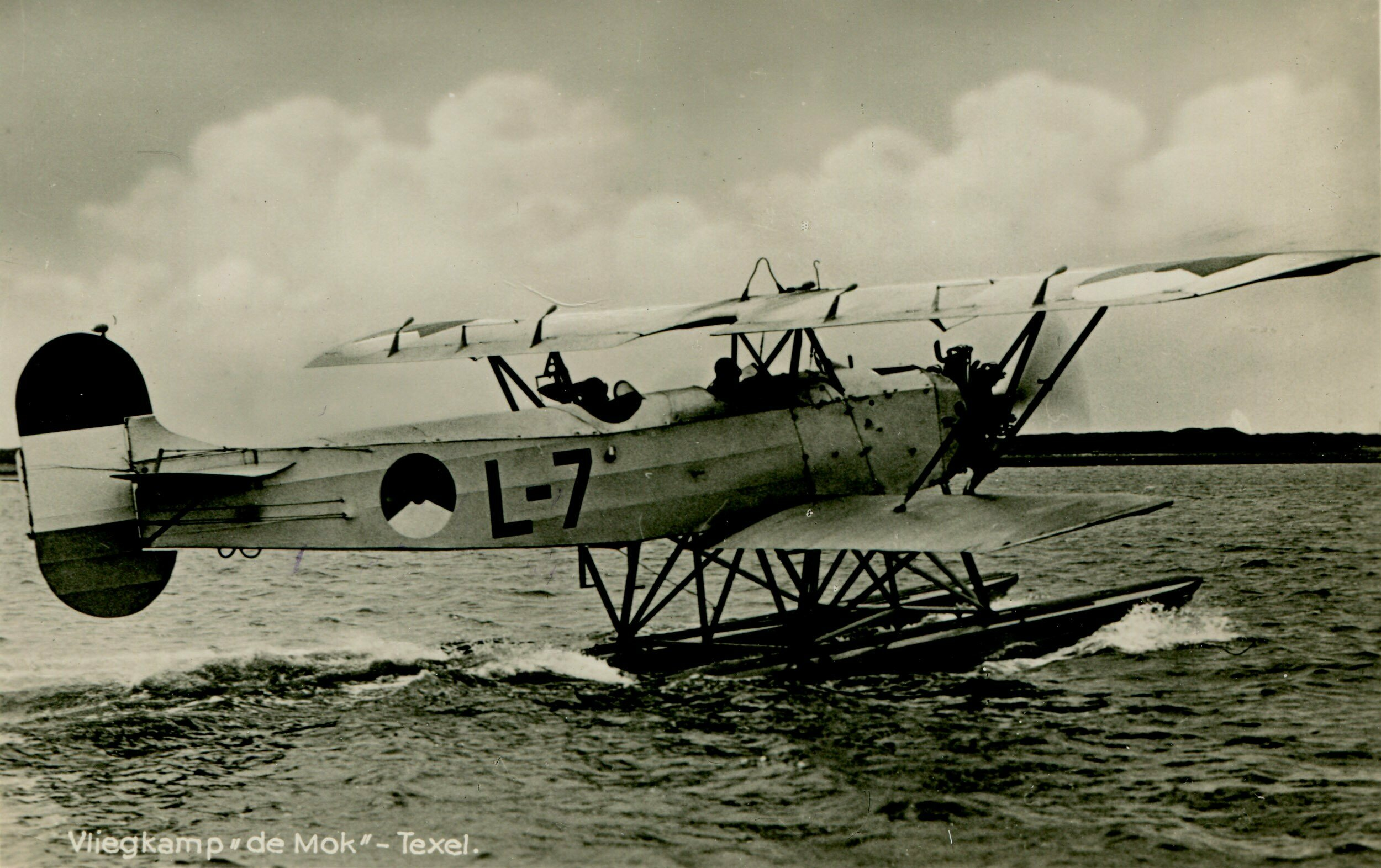
- Fokker C.VII-W

General information
- Type: Reconnaissance aircraft
- Manufacturer: Fokker
- Primary user: Royal Netherlands Navy
- Number built: 30

History
- First flight: 1928

The Fokker C.VII-W was a reconnaissance seaplane built in the Netherlands in the late 1920s. Sharing elements of the highly successful C.V design, the C.VII-W was a conventional, single-bay biplane with wings of unequal span braced with N-struts. The undercarriage consisted of a standard twin-pontoon arrangement, and the fin and rudder continued through to the ventral side of the fuselage, creating a cruciform tail. The pilot and observer sat in tandem, open cockpits. The wing structure was wooden with fabric and plywood covering, and the fuselage was of steel tube construction with fabric covering.

The first twelve of the thirty examples produced were sent to the Dutch East Indies, with the rest remaining in the Netherlands. The type was withdrawn from front-line service in 1940, but some machines remained active in the East Indies as trainers until the Japanese invasion in 1942.

== Operators ==
Netherlands

- Royal Netherlands Navy

== Specifications (C.VII-W) ==
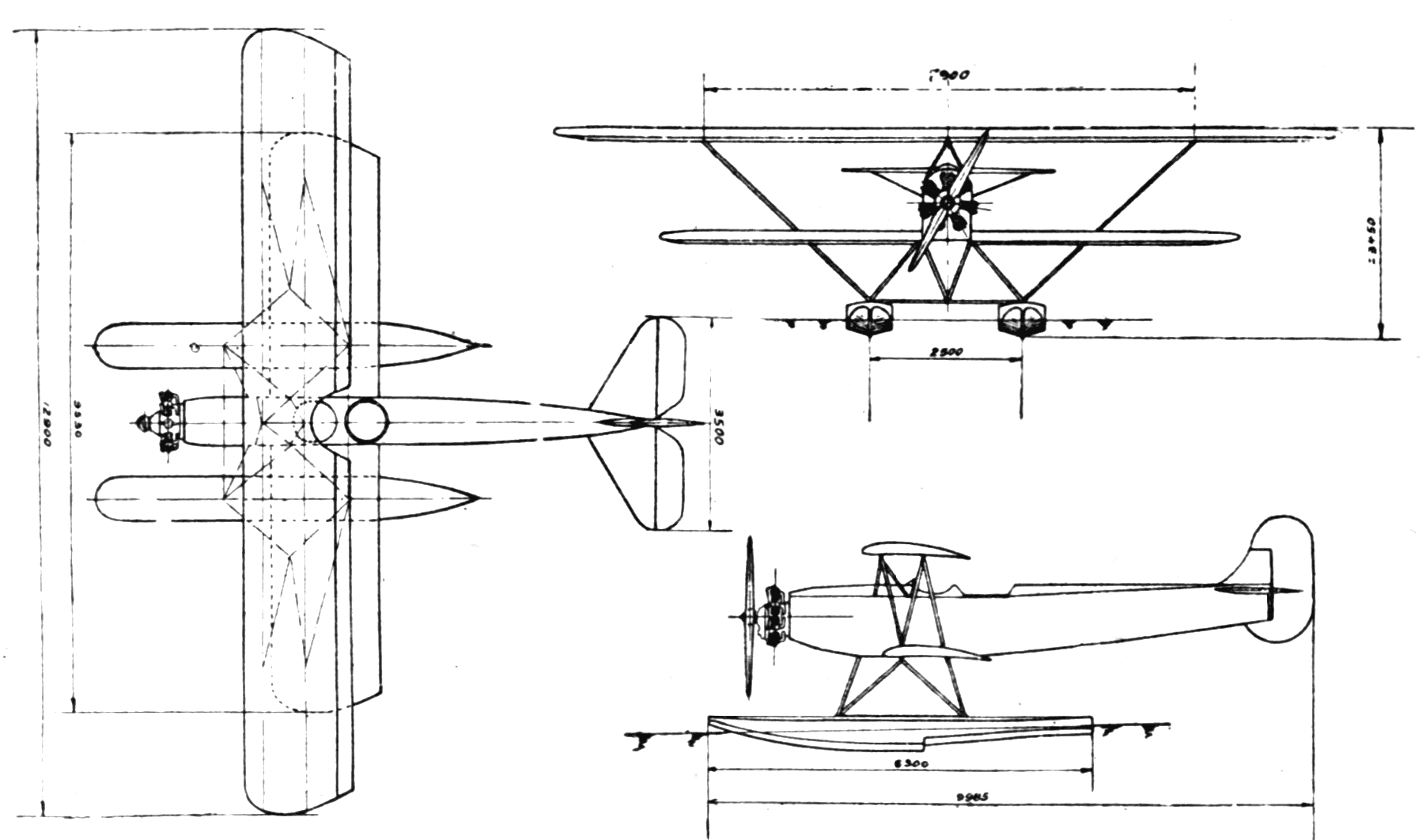
Fokker C VII W 3-View drawing from L'Air April 15,1929

Data from Jane's all the World's Aircraft 1928

General characteristics

- Crew: 2
- Length: 9.98 m (32 ft 9 in)
- Wingspan: 12.9 m (42 ft 4 in)
- Height: 4 m (13 ft 1 in)
- Wing area: 37 m^{2} (400 sq ft)
- Empty weight: 1,102 kg (2,429 lb) training mission; 1,120 kg (2,470 lb) reconnaissance mission
- Gross weight: 1,415 kg (3,120 lb) training mission; 1,620 kg (3,570 lb) reconnaissance mission
- Fuel capacity: 330 L (87 US gal; 73 imp gal) fuel; 30 L (7.9 US gal; 6.6 imp gal) oil
- Powerplant: 1 × Armstrong Siddeley Lynx 7-cylinder air-cooled radial piston engine, 168 kW (225 hp)
- Propellers: 2-bladed fixed pitch propeller

Performance

- Maximum speed: 160 km/h (99 mph, 86 kn)
- Cruise speed: 130 km/h (81 mph, 70 kn)
- Landing speed: 70 km/h (43 mph; 38 kn)
- Service ceiling: 3,600 m (11,800 ft) training mission; 3,200 m (10,500 ft) reconnaissance mission
- Time to altitude: 1,000 m (3,300 ft) in 6.8 minutes (training) / 9 minutes (reconnaissance); 2,000 m (6,600 ft) in 15.8 minutes (training) / 21 minutes (reconnaissance);
- Wing loading: 38.2 kg/m^{2} (7.8 lb/sq ft)

Armament

- Guns: reconnaissance mission - provision for a machine gun on a Scarff ring in the rear cockpit
- Bombs: reconnaissance mission - provision for light bomb racks under the observers cockpit

== Bibliography ==
- Ledet, Michel (January 1997). "Le Fokker C-VII W (première partie)". Avions: Toute l'aéronautique et son histoire (in French) (46): 15–17. ISSN 1243-8650.
- Ledet, Michel (February 1997). "Le Fokker C-VII W (deuxième et dernière partie)". Avions: Toute l'aéronautique et son histoire (in French) (47): 34–42. ISSN 1243-8650.
- Taylor, Michael J. H. (1989). Jane's Encyclopedia of Aviation. London: Studio Editions. p. 404.
- World Aircraft Information Files. London: Bright Star Publishing. pp. File 894 Sheet 34.
