= HNLMS Kortenaer (1927) =

Dutch destroyer

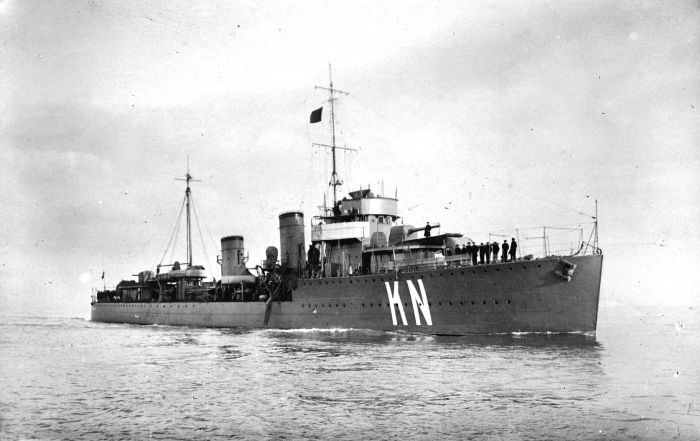
- HNLMS Kortenaer in calm waters

History

Netherlands
- Name: Kortenaer
- Namesake: Egbert Kortenaer
- Builder: Burgerhout, Rotterdam
- Laid down: 24 August 1925
- Launched: 30 June 1927
- Commissioned: 3 September 1928
- Fate: Torpedoed and sunk during the Battle of the Java Sea, 27 February 1942 6°29′S 112°05′E

General characteristics
- Class & type: Admiralen-class destroyer
- Displacement: 1,310 long tons (1,331 t) standard
- Length: 98.15 m (322 ft 0 in) oa; 93.57 m (307 ft 0 in) lbp
- Beam: 9.45 m (31 ft 0 in)
- Draft: 3 m (9 ft 10 in)
- Installed power: 31,000 hp (23 MW)
- Propulsion: 3 × Yarrow boilers; 2 × turbines; 2 × shafts
- Speed: 36 knots (67 km/h; 41 mph)
- Range: 3,200 nmi (5,900 km; 3,700 mi) at 15 kn (28 km/h; 17 mph)
- Complement: 129
- Armament: 4 × Bofors 12 cm/50 (4.7 in) Mark 4 guns (4×1); 2 × Bofors 7.5 cm/55 (2.95") Mark 6 AA guns (2×1); 4 × 12.7 mm (0.50 in) machine guns; 6 × 53.3 cm (21 in) torpedo tubes (2×3); 24 × mines
- Aircraft carried: 1 × Fokker C.VII-W floatplane
- Aviation facilities: 1 × Davit

HNLMS Kortenaer was an Admiralen-class destroyer operated by the Royal Netherlands Navy between 1928 and 1942. Equipped to also operate as a minelayer, she was built to defend the Dutch East Indies and to safeguard Dutch colonial possessions throughout the world. The first decade of her service was largely routine, with alternating periods in the Caribbean, Southeast Asia, and Europe. In 1929, she was a part of the Dutch response to an attack on Curaçao by Venezuelan rebels, although she arrived too late to have an effect.

By 1938, she operated in Asia and protected colonial waters even after the Netherlands had capitulated to Germany. Following Japanese attacks throughout Asia in 1942, Kortenaer joined the American-British-Dutch-Australian Command fleet to aid in the defense of the East Indies. While she was intended to participate in the Battle of Badung Strait, she ran aground when leaving port. After suffering damage to her boilers and having her maximum speed reduced, she rejoined the fleet for the Battle of the Java Sea. During the action, she was torpedoed when the Allied battle line collapsed, and she quickly sank. Her wreckage was later illegally salvaged for metal in the 2010s, which destroyed parts of the ship.

== Development and design ==
During the early 20th century, the primary goal of the Royal Netherlands Navy was the defense of the resource-rich and economically vital Dutch East Indies. By the end of World War I, wartime advancements in marine engineering and naval architecture—particularly in submarines and aircraft—left the neutral Dutch Navy technologically behind its European counterparts. During the interwar period, the navy pursued rapid modernization, studying the equipment of other nations while designing a new class of destroyers.

Around this time, the British Royal Navy held a design competition for its first postwar destroyers. One of the designs, HMS Ambuscade, built by Thornycroft, impressed Dutch officials. The Netherlands adopted a modified version of this design for service in the East Indies, where Japan was increasingly viewed as the most significant threat. Compared to the British design, the Dutch version was slightly slower and had a reduced range in exchange for a more powerful anti-aircraft armament and the inclusion of a reconnaissance seaplane. The design became known as the Admiralen-class destroyer, as every ship was named after a Dutch admiral. The eight destroyers in the class were divided into two subgroups: the first four, including Kortenaer, were equipped for minelaying, while the latter four displaced slightly more and were furnished with minesweeping equipment.

=== Characteristics ===
The ships' primary armament consisted of four single-mounted Bofors 12 cm (4.7 in) guns—two forward and two aft—with only two of the mounts protected with gun shields. Two 7.6 cm (3 in) guns mounted between the funnels and four 1.3 cm (.5 in) machine guns provided anti-aircraft defense. A distinctive feature of the class was a floatplane platform mounted above one of the two triple 53 cm (21 in) torpedo tube mounts. The aircraft, a Fokker C VII-W, was used for reconnaissance as the many islands in the Indonesian archipelago made locating enemy vessels difficult. The minelaying destroyers were 98.15 m (322 ft 0 in) long, had a beam of 9.45 m (31 ft 0 in), a draft of 3 m (9 ft 10 in), and a displacement of 1,310 long tons (1,331 t). Three Yarrow boilers powered two steam turbines that drove the ship's two propellers which produced 31,000 shaft horsepower (23,000 kilowatts) and a top speed of 36 knots (67 km/h; 41 mph). She had a range of 3,200 nmi (5,900 km; 3,700 mi) at an economic speed of 15 kn (28 km/h; 17 mph) supported by 305 metric tons (336 short tons) of fuel. The ships could carry 24 mines and were manned by a crew of 129.

== History ==
=== Peacetime ===
The destroyer was laid down on 24 August 1925 by Burgerhout and was launched on 30 June 1927. On 3 September 1928, she was commissioned and named Kortenaer, after the 17th century admiral of the same name. Her first role was to guard the Dutch Caribbean, and she returned from the deployment in March 1929. On 8 June, Venezuelan revolutionaries led by Rafael Urbina attacked and occupied the Waterfort on Curaçao in an attempt to gather support for a planned coup in Venezuela. Urbina's forces seized guns, ammunition, and several Dutch officials. In response, Kortenaer and the coastal defense ship Hertog Hendrik was dispatched from the Netherlands with dozens of Marines on board the destroyer. After crossing the Atlantic, the two ships arrived too late; the rebels had left Curaçao, landed in Venezuela, and were promptly defeated as many of the stolen rounds were blanks. The hostages were released, and Kortenaer remained in the region to reinforce defenses.

Over the next decade, she operated with other Dutch vessels in both the Pacific and Europe during world-wide cruises. Before and immediately following the outbreak of World War II, she patrolled off the East Indies and intercepted numerous vessels accused of violating Dutch sovereignty. In one incident in 1938, Kortenaer intercepted several illegal Japanese-operated fishing vessels and arrested the crews. The boats likely operated as part of a disguised Japanese effort to scout the region for invasion.

Like the rest of the Royal Netherlands Navy during the period, Kortenaer's enlisted crew in the Pacific included a significant number of ethnic Indonesian sailors. In accordance with Navy policy at the time, native Indonesians were permitted to only serve on vessels based in the Dutch East Indies and were segregated from their ethnic Dutch counterparts. They were frequently assigned to the most dangerous duties aboard ship, such as stoking, to reduce risks to Dutch personnel. Racial relations were consistently poor, marked by systemic discrimination as Indonesian sailors received lower pay, were excluded from serving as officers, and were often regarded by Dutch officers as potentially disloyal or ethnically inferior.

=== Dutch East Indies Campaign ===
After the German invasion of the Netherlands in May 1940, the region was further militarized and she was tasked with escorting various civilian vessels throughout the region. Following the bombing of Pearl Harbor and Japanese attacks on British Malaya, the Dutch government-in-exile declared war on Japan on 8 December 1941. Over the next two months, Japan's rapid advancement across Southeast Asia overwhelmed the region's Allied naval forces. In an effort to coordinate resistance, elements of the Australian, British, Dutch, and American navies formed the American-British-Dutch-Australian Command (ABDACOM): an ad hoc command that brought together each nation's available ships under a (nominally) unified structure. One of ABDACOM's first steps was the formation of an offensive fleet—the Combined Striking Force—composed of a mix of American and Dutch cruisers and destroyers. After an initial delay, Kortenaer was reassigned to the Striking Force that was in desperate need of ships. Command of the fleet was under Dutch Admiral Karel Doorman on his flagship De Ruyter, who was already in charge of the Dutch East Indies Fleet.

==== Battle of Badung Strait ====
Japan's next target was Bali. The Allies knew the fall of Bali would directly threaten ABDACOM's bases on Java, and that an immediate response was needed. A force to counterattack was assembled, but due to time constraints, the Allies were unable to coordinate a unified strike. As Kortenaer pulled out from Soerabaja alongside other ships intended to intercept the Japanese, the helmsman lost control of her rudder and ran aground at 10 p.m. While the morning's tide could have freed the ship, Doorman believed he did not have time to wait and left her behind. In the resulting action, the ABDACOM fleet was routed with the loss of HNLMS Piet Hein and Bali. The destroyer was largely repaired and afloat the next morning, although a leaking boiler reduced her speed to 26 knots (48 km/h; 30 mph).

==== Battle of the Java Sea ====
On 26 February, the Allies learned the invasion of Java was underway. Doorman intended to use everything at his disposal to repel the assault, and was reinforced by units from the Royal Navy and Royal Australian Navy. The enlarged fleet, comprising five cruisers and nine destroyers from four nations, moved to intercept the Japanese forces off Java. Contact was made in the mid-afternoon, and the two fleets engaged at long range. Kortenaer sailed alongside several British destroyers, but her aforementioned boiler issue caused her to lag and soon fall out of formation. Doorman intended on having his force remain cohesive and ordered the fleet to slow down and keep pace with the destroyer. The battle began in the mid-afternoon, but progress was slow as the two fleets engaged at long range and missed most shots. The situation changed when HMS Exeter was struck in her boiler room by the heavy cruiser Haguro, which cut her speed to 11 knots (20 km/h; 13 mph). As Exeter turned to withdraw and avoid colliding with the ships behind her, the trailing cruisers followed suit and mistakenly believed an order to do so had been given by De Ruyter. The Allied formation quickly fell apart as Doorman attempted to reform his battle line as the turn presented a large profile for the Japanese to target.

==== Sinking ====
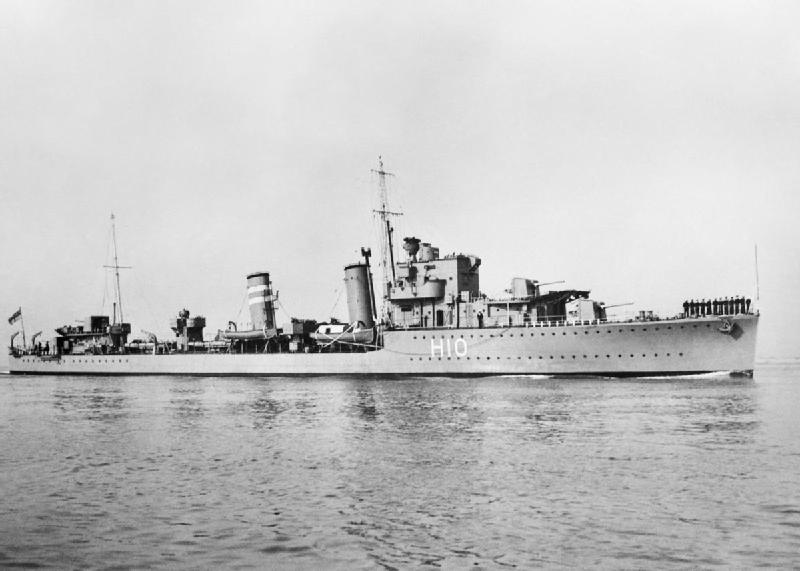
The British HMS Encounter, which rescued the survivors of Kortenaer following the initial engagement in the Java Sea.

About 20 minutes before the hit on Exeter, Haguro and cruiser Nachi prepared to attack with torpedoes as the guns-only engagement had failed to change the situation. At 4:53 p.m., Haguro fired a spread of eight torpedoes after a technical issue on Nachi prevented her from following suit. The only successful shot struck Kortenaer's engine room at 5:13 p.m. The resulting explosion ripped the destroyer apart as she hogged into a 'V' shape and immediately capsized. The explosion blew crew members overboard, with some desperately clinging to the still-rotating shafts or the ship's mast, while others either jumped or were pushed into the water. She sank in less than two minutes; other warships in the fleet were concerned about further torpedoes and did not stop to rescue the crew. Her life rafts floated to the surface, which allowed survivors to cling on and group together. Tensions on the rafts deteriorated along ethnic lines as the largely-Indonesian seamen blamed the Dutch officers for the sinking, which was only resolved when an officer beat the crew members with a paddle to restore order. Hours later, the ABDA fleet sailed by and noticed the survivors. HMS Encounter was detached to pick up the remaining 115 of 153 crewmembers, who brought them to shore. Indonesian sailors accounted for 28 of the 57 casualties, a disproportionately high number as they formed only a third of the Royal Netherlands Navy's personnel.

== Wreck ==
The destroyer's capsized wreckage broke apart in deep 52 m (171 ft) water. When surveyed in 2004, her two halves were described as being 30–40 m (98–131 ft) apart from each other in a debris field snared in fishing nets and sunk into mud. In 2016, an expedition reported several new tears made into her hull, various parts missing, and her machinery spaces ruptured, which led officials to believe the wreck had been intentionally dismantled. The Dutch government investigated, offended at the mass disturbance of war graves; it was determined the damage was part of a trend where shallow World War II-era shipwrecks were blown apart and salvaged by groups posing as fishermen. The Chinese dredger Chuan Hong 68, believed to be responsible, was detained by Malaysian authorities in 2024 and accused of having dismantled the wreckages for either low-background steel or scrap metal. It was alleged the scrapping was done regardless of the wreckages' nationality, with American, Dutch, Japanese, British, and Australian ships affected. In 2018, The Guardian reported the bones from Kortenaer and other warships were removed from their respective wreckages during scrapping in Indonesia and were dumped in several mass graves on land or off the coastline. The Dutch and Indonesian governments collaborated in the investigation, exhumed suspected graves and laid out plans to prevent further damage to the shipwrecks.

== Sources ==
=== Print ===
- Chesneau, Roger; Gardiner, Robert (1980). Conway's All the World's Fighting Ships, 1922-1946. Annapolis, Maryland: Naval Institute Press. ISBN 978-0-87021-913-9.
- Cox, Jeffrey (17 November 2015). Rising Sun, Falling Skies: The Disastrous Java Sea Campaign of World War II. General Military. London: Bloomsbury Publishing. ISBN 978-1-4728-1060-1.
- Jones, Mark C. (July 2024). "Double-Edged Sword: Indonesian Personnel in the Royal Netherlands Navy". Journal of Military History. 88 (3): 714–740.
- Kehn, Donald M. (1 August 2017). In the Highest Degree Tragic: The Sacrifice of the U.S. Asiatic Fleet in the East Indies during World War II. Lincoln, Nebraska: Potomac Books. ISBN 978-1612349190.
- Noppen, Ryan K. (20 August 2020). The Royal Netherlands Navy of World War II. New Vanguard Series. Paul Wright (1st ed.). London: Bloomsbury Publishing. ISBN 978-1-4728-4191-9.
- Stille, Mark (26 November 2019). Java Sea 1942: Japan's Conquest of the Netherlands East Indies (Online ed.). Oxford: Osprey Publishing. ISBN 978-1472831613.
- Whitley, Mike J. (1988). Destroyers of World War Two: An International Encyclopedia. Annapolis, Maryland: Naval Institute Press. ISBN 978-0-87021-326-7.
- Womack, Tom (2016). The Allied Defense of the Malay Barrier, 1941-1942. Jefferson, North Carolina: McFarland & Company. ISBN 978-1-4766-6293-0.
- Zinderen Bakker, Rindert van; Mulder, Jantinus (2018). Destroyer HNLMS Kortenaer. Warship (First printing ed.). Emmen: Lanasta. ISBN 978-94-6456-250-7.

=== Online ===
- "1942: February 18–20: Battle of Badung Strait". National Museum of the US Navy.
- Algemeen Pensioenfonds Curaçao (2022). "Critical Heritage Report The Waterfort Willemstad, Curaçao" (PDF). Erfgoed Advies Jan de Jong.
- "BBC - WW2 People's War - Timeline Fact File: Battle of Java Sea". BBC History.
- Boffey, Daniel (22 January 2018). "Bodies of Second World War Sailors in Java Sea 'Dumped in Mass Grave'". The Guardian. ISSN 0261-3077.
- Grady, John (25 May 2023). "U.K. Royal Navy 'Distressed and Concerned' by Illegal Chinese Salvage of WWII Wrecks". USNI News.
- Grady, John (4 July 2024). "Chinese Ship Suspected of Raiding World War II Wrecks Detained". USNI News.
- Holmes, Oliver (16 November 2016). "Mystery as Wrecks of Three Dutch WWII Ships Vanish from Java Seabed". The Guardian. ISSN 0261-3077.
- Lamb, Kate (28 February 2018). "Lost Bones, A Mass Grave and War Wrecks Plundered off Indonesia". The Guardian. ISSN 0261-3077.
- "Verification of the Location and Condition of the Dutch Shipwrecks in the Java Sea" (PDF). Rijksdienst voor het Cultureel Erfgoed (Cultural Heritage Agency of the Netherlands). 9 February 2017.
- "Investigation into Disappeared WWII Wrecks in Asia - Maritime Heritage - Cultural Heritage Agency". english.cultureelerfgoed.nl. Rijksdienst voor het Cultureel Erfgoed (Cultural Heritage Agency of the Netherlands). 2021-07-21. Archived from the original on 13 September 2024.
