= USS Parrott =

Clemson-class destroyer

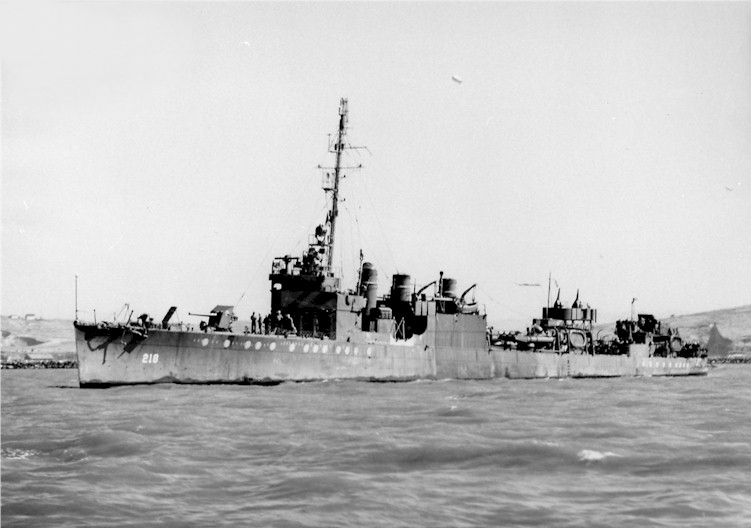

History

United States
- Namesake: George Fountain Parrott
- Builder: William Cramp & Sons, Philadelphia
- Yard number: 484
- Laid down: 23 July 1919
- Launched: 25 November 1919
- Commissioned: 11 May 1920
- Decommissioned: 14 June 1944
- Stricken: 18 July 1944
- Fate: Sold for scrapping, 5 April 1947

General characteristics
- Class & type: Clemson-class destroyer
- Displacement: 1,190 tons
- Length: 314 feet 4 inches (95.81 m)
- Beam: 30 feet 8 inches (9.35 m)
- Draft: 13 feet 6 inches (4.11 m)
- Propulsion: 26,500 shp (20 MW); geared turbines, 2 screws
- Speed: 35 knots (65 km/h)
- Complement: 157 officers and enlisted
- Armament: 4 x 4 in (100 mm) guns, 12 x 21 inch (533 mm) TT.

USS Parrott (DD-218) was a Clemson-class destroyer in the United States Navy during World War II and was the second ship named for George Fountain Parrott.

== Construction and commissioning ==
Parrott was laid down 23 July 1919 by and launched 25 November from William Cramp & Sons Shipbuilding & Engine Company; sponsored by Miss Julia B. Parrott; and commissioned 11 May 1920.

== Service history ==
=== 1920–1940 ===
Following shakedown, Parrott was assigned to Destroyer Division 38 of the Pacific Fleet of which she was later designated flagship. She departed Boston, Massachusetts, 7 August 1920 for San Diego, California, arriving 7 September. She operated in coastal waters, ranging as far south as Valparaíso, Chile, until reassigned to the Atlantic Fleet 3 December 1921 and ordered to Philadelphia.

Parrott escorted Mayflower from Hampton Roads and Annapolis, Maryland to Washington, D.C., 26 May 1922 – 30 May 1922 and then was fitted out for European duty.

On 12 June, Parrott sailed from Newport, Rhode Island with her division to report to Commander U.S. Naval Detachment Turkish Waters at Constantinople to assist American Relief Agencies in aiding political refugees and protecting American lives and interests. From time to time, Parrott served as communications and station ship in the Black Sea, Aegean and Eastern Mediterranean. From 13 September to 25 October, she evacuated refugees following the Smyrna fire, and escorted ships sent by other nations to help persons who had asked for protection.

From 6 July to 24 August 1923, Parrott made visits to Greece, Turkey, Romania, Bulgaria and Russia, meeting with civic officials and showing the flag. During the following year (1924) she made similar visits to Bizerte, Tunis, Livorno, Genoa, Patmos, Villefranche-sur-Mer, Cagliari and Sardinia, returning to New York in July.

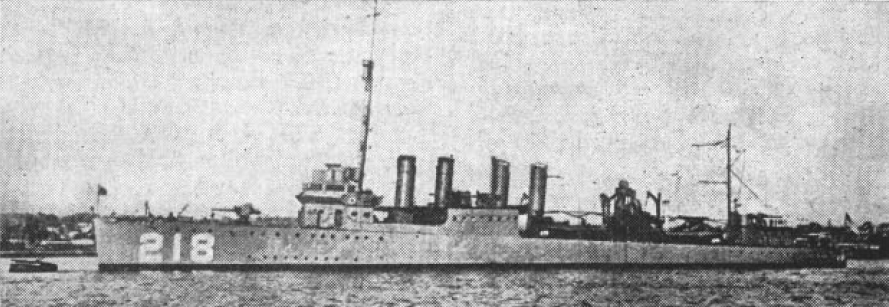
Parrott in the early 1920s.

Reassigned to the Asiatic Fleet, Parrott departed Philadelphia 3 January 1925 for Pearl Harbor via the Panama Canal Zone and San Diego. She made a training stop at Pearl Harbor on 27 April and proceeded on 29 May, via Midway, to join the Fleet at Chefoo, China 14 June. Because of unsettled conditions in China Parrott, with other units, sailed to Shanghai and put ashore a landing force. Parrott remained in the area until 31 July, and returned 10 September to Shanghai for duty with the Yangtze River Patrol until 16 October when she departed for the Philippines.

After operations out of Manila from 19 October to 15 March 1926, she reported to the Commander South China Patrol at Swatow remaining until 14 June. At this time revolution in China caused intense naval activity resulting in practically the entire Asiatic Fleet assembling in Chinese waters. Parrott carried out a rigorous schedule in again aiding and protecting the interest of Americans and other neutrals. She was relieved 25 October 1927 and sailed south via Hong Kong, Bangkok and Saigon to Manila, arriving 18 November.

During 1928, Parrott made many calls to Philippine ports least frequented by American ships. From 1928 into 1934, she remained on Asiatic Patrol operating from Manila. In 1935, she was ordered to French Indochina to collect hydrographic data in and around Saigon. She resumed Neutrality patrol in 1936, and by 1940 had served successively as station ship at Amoy and Swatow, China. From 7 July to 4 October, Parrott patrolled China waters based at Tsingtao and then made calls to other northern Chinese ports, returning to Manila 11 October.

=== World War II ===
In Cavite Navy Yard, Parrott spent the first two months of 1941 having anti-mine and sound detection gear installed, after which, she trained with destroyers and submarines. She assumed duties as off-shore sound patrol picket at the entrance to Manila Bay on 6 October, and late in November joined Task Force 5 at Tarakan, Borneo, Netherlands East Indies. The Task Force was still operating in this area when hostilities began.

When the Philippines fell to the Japanese, the Asiatic Fleet moved south and operated under a unified American-British-Dutch-Australian Command (ABDA) from a base at Surabaya, Java. On 9 January 1942 Parrott was one of five destroyers in an escort composed of the cruisers USS Boise (CL-47) and USS Marblehead (CL-12), with the other destroyers USS Stewart (DD-224), USS Bulmer (DD-222), USS Pope (DD-225), and USS Barker (DD-213) departing from Darwin to Surabaya escorting the transport Bloemfontein. That transport had been part of the Pensacola Convoy and had left Brisbane 30 December 1941 with Army reinforcements composed of the 26th Field Artillery Brigade and Headquarters Battery, the 1st Battalion, 131st Field Artillery and supplies from that convoy destined for Java.

After dark, on 23 January 1942, Parrott, with John D. Ford, Pope and Paul Jones, entered Balikpapan Bay where, lying at anchor, were 16 Japanese transports and three 750-ton torpedo boats, guarded by a Japanese Destroyer Squadron. The Allied ships fired several patterns of torpedoes and saw four enemy transports sunk and one torpedo boat damaged as the Japanese destroyers searched in the strait for a Dutch submarine.

Parrott returned to Surabaya 25 January, and sailed five days later as part of the escort for two Dutch ships as far as Lombok Strait. She then swept through the South China Sea with the combined ABDA force, fighting off three Japanese aerial attacks on 15 February, as the Allies attempted to intercept and prevent a landing on the east coast of Sumatra. She came into Surabaya for fuel 19 February, firing upon enemy planes whilst there, before departing with other destroyers for a night attack on Japanese forces off Bali. Contact was made with two Japanese destroyers and a transport just past midnight on 19/20 February, and in the ensuing fight, Piet Hein was sunk and Michishio heavily damaged. Parrott struck ground in the shoals off Bali but was able to churn herself free and retire with the rest of the force to Surabaya.

Parrott was delegated the task of escorting Sea Witch, (Note: While DANFS & Gill use Seawitch all others use Sea Witch and Lloyd's register of the period shows the later name and not the first. Sea Witch was a C2 cargo ship built at Tampa Shipbuilding 1940.) carrying twenty-seven crated P-40s, into Tjilatjap 28 February and then proceed to Fremantle as her consorts of the ABDA force made an attempt to forestall the invasion of Java by Japanese forces in the unsuccessful Battle of the Java Sea.

Parrott returned to the States for repairs, left the yard in July and commenced the first of eight convoy escort voyages between San Francisco and Pearl Harbor. On 21 May 1943, she sailed for New York arriving 12 June and reported for transatlantic convoy duty. She completed one convoy passage before joining Paul Jones and Belknap in an offensive antisubmarine group with Croatan. She operated with this group until 15 October when she transferred to another antisubmarine group formed around Block Island.

Parrott participated in sinking U-220 on 28 October, but the credit went to Block Island planes. In March 1944, Parrott reported at Norfolk for convoy assignment.

As escort for Convoy UGS–35, she reached Casablanca 26 March, then bombarded the coast of Spanish Morocco, south of Cape Spartel, on 27 March before escorting convoy GUS–34 back to Boston, arriving 15 April.

=== Fate ===
While getting underway from Norfolk on 2 May, Parrott was rammed by John Morton while backing out of a slip, bending her hull, and was so severely damaged she had to be beached by tugs. Later towed to Norfolk Naval Shipyard, she decommissioned 14 June 1944. She was struck from the Navy List 18 July 1944, and her hulk was sold for scrapping 5 April 1947 to the Marine Salvage Company of Richmond, Virginia.

== Awards ==
Parrott earned two battle stars for her service in World War II.
