= HNLMS Evertsen (1926) =

Dutch destroyer (1928–1942)

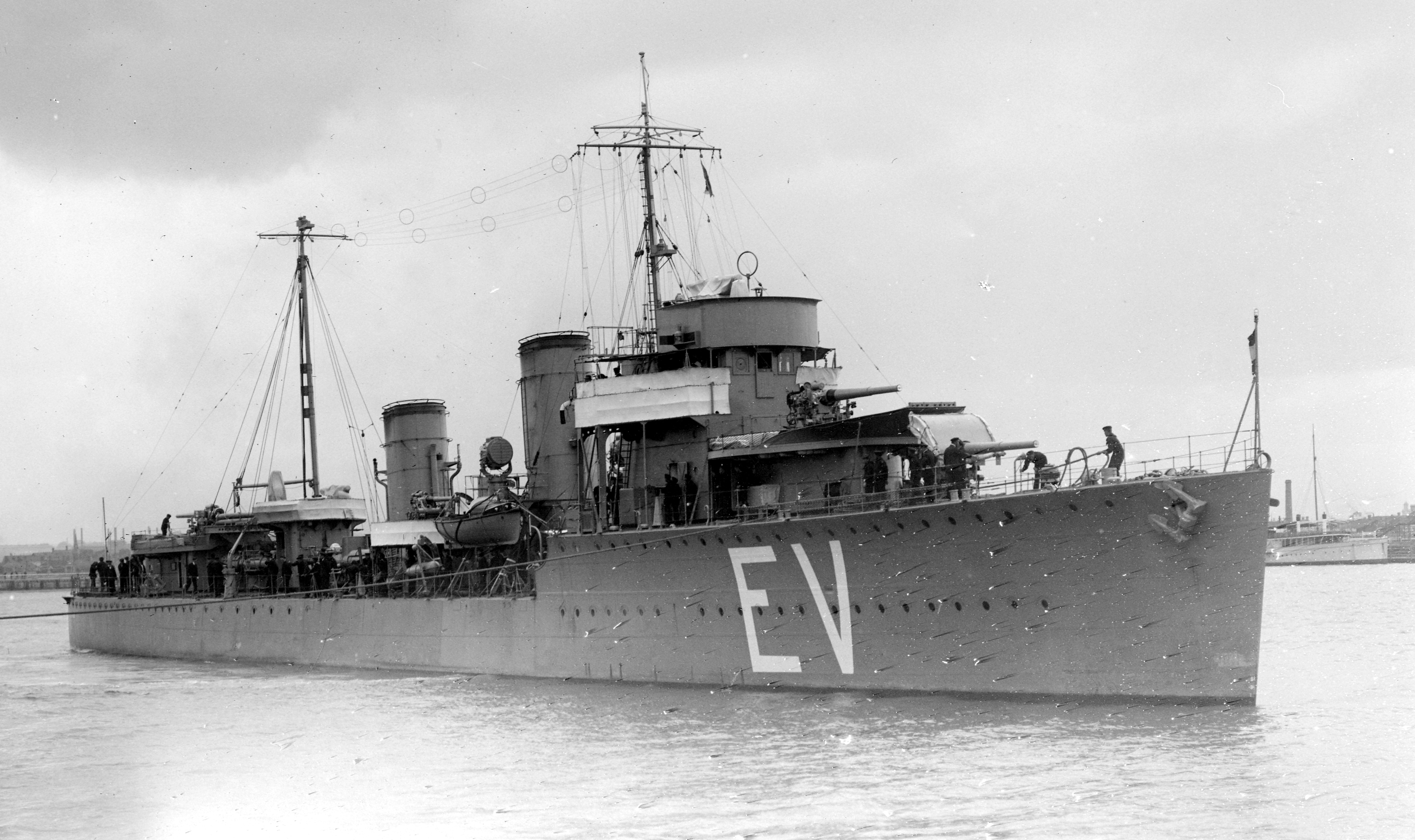
- HNLMS Evertsen sometime before 1940

History

Netherlands
- Name: Evertsen
- Namesake: Johan Evertsen
- Builder: Burgerhout, Rotterdam
- Laid down: 5 August 1925
- Launched: 29 December 1926
- Commissioned: 12 April 1928
- Fate: Destroyed, 1 March 1942

General characteristics
- Class & type: Admiralen-class destroyer
- Displacement: 1,310 long tons (1,331 t) standard
- Length: 98.15 m (322.0 ft) oa; 93.57 m (307.0 ft) lbp
- Beam: 9.45 m (31.0 ft)
- Draft: 3 m (9.8 ft)
- Installed power: 31,000 hp (23 MW)
- Propulsion: 3 × Yarrow boilers; 2 × turbines; 2 × shafts
- Speed: 36 knots (67 km/h; 41 mph)
- Range: 3,200 nmi (5,900 km; 3,700 mi) at 15 kn (28 km/h; 17 mph)
- Complement: 129
- Armament: 4 × 4.7 in (120 mm) guns (4×1); 2 × 3 in (76 mm) AA guns (2×1); 4 × .5 in (13 mm) machine guns; 6 × 21 in (533 mm) torpedo tubes (2×3); 24 × mines
- Aircraft carried: 1 × Fokker C.VII-W floatplane
- Aviation facilities: 1 × Davit

HNLMS Evertsen was an Admiralen-class destroyer of the Royal Netherlands Navy operated between 1928 and 1942. Alongside her class, she was designed to serve as both as a destroyer and minelayer in the Dutch East Indies. During World War II, she operated with an Allied fleet in the unsuccessful defense of the East Indies. In February 1942, the destroyer was evacuating the region as she lagged behind the cruisers Perth and Houston. The two cruisers were destroyed in view of Evertsen during the Battle of Sunda Strait. The destroyer attempted to discreetly escape, but she was spotted by Japanese ships and was crippled by shell fire. With no escape, she was beached, the crew ran inland, and was destroyed by a fire.

== Development and design ==
During the early 20th century, the primary goal of the Royal Netherlands Navy was the defense of the resource-rich and economically vital Dutch East Indies. By the end of World War I, wartime advancements in marine engineering and naval architecture—particularly in submarines and aircraft—left the neutral Dutch Navy technologically behind its European counterparts. In the interwar period, the Navy planned for a rapid modernization and studied the equipment of other nations while designing a new class of destroyers.

Simultaneously, the British Royal Navy held a design competition for its first postwar destroyers. One of the designs, HMS Ambuscade, built by Thornycroft, impressed Dutch officials. The Netherlands subsequently adopted a modified version of this design for service in the East Indies, where Japan was increasingly viewed as the most significant threat. Compared to the British design, the Dutch version was slightly slower and had a reduced range in exchange for a more powerful anti-aircraft armament and the inclusion of a reconnaissance seaplane. The design became known as the Admiralen-class destroyer, as every ship was named after a Dutch 17th century admiral. The eight destroyers in the class were divided into two subgroups: the first four, including Evertsen, were equipped for minelaying, while the latter four displaced slightly more and furnished with minesweeping equipment.

=== Characteristics ===
The ships' primary armament consisted of four single-mounted Bofors 12 cm (4.7 in) guns—two forward and two aft—with only two of the mounts protected with gun shields. Two 7.6 cm (3 in) guns mounted between the funnels and four 1.3 cm (.5 in) machine guns provided anti-aircraft defense. A distinctive feature of the class was a floatplane platform mounted above one of the two triple 53 cm (21 in) torpedo tube mounts. The aircraft, a Fokker C VII-W, was used for reconnaissance as the many islands in the Indonesian archipelago made locating enemy vessels difficult. The minelaying destroyers were 98.15 m (322 ft) long, had a beam of 9.45 m (31 ft), had a draught of 3 m (9.8 ft), and a displacement of 1,310 long tons (1,331 t). They were propelled by three Yarrow boilers that produced 31,000 shaft horsepower (23,000 kilowatts) and a top speed of 36 knots (67 km/h; 41 mph) through two propellers. The ships could carry 24 mines and were manned by a crew of 129.

== Service history ==
She was laid down on 5 August 1925 by Burgerhout and was launched on 29 December 1926. On 12 April 1928, she was commissioned and named Evertsen, after the 17th century admiral of the same name and the Evertsen family of naval commanders and sailors.Following the capitulation of the Netherlands to Nazi Germany in May 1940, Evertsen and her sisterships operated out of the East Indies and escorted Dutch vessels throughout the region.

=== Dutch East Indies Campaign ===
Following the bombing of Pearl Harbor and Japanese attacks on British Malaya, the Dutch government-in-exile declared war on Japan on 8 December 1941.Evertsen had recently returned to service, and her crew was fresh out of training. To gain experience, she was tasked with escorting reinforcements to Singapore for the first parts of the campaign. Over the next two months, Japan's rapid advances across Southeast Asia overwhelmed the region's Allied naval forces. In an effort to coordinate resistance, elements of the Australian, British, Dutch, and American navies formed American-British-Dutch-Australian Command (ABDACOM): an ad hoc command that brought together each nation's available ships under a (nominally) unified structure. One of ABDACOM's first steps was the formation several fleets—the Eastern, Western, and Combined Striking Force—composed of a mix of American and Dutch cruisers and destroyers. After initial delay, Evertsen was reassigned to the Western Striking Force that was in desperate need of ships.

==== Battle of Sunda Strait ====
On 28 February, the destroyer operated with the Western Striking Force as the fleet withdrew from the Indonesian Archipelago and headed to Ceylon. The commander of the force, John Collins, believed it was suicidal to remain in the region as he had little hope in resisting the Japanese. The force sailed into a storm, which resulted in Evertsen becoming separated. Without her allies, she sailed back to Tanjoeng Priok, where they started. Her crew was only partially trained, which was likely why she was ordered to evacuate instead of being transferred to the Eastern Striking Force alongside the more modern and capable warships she had just previously served with.

There, she rendezvoused with cruisers HMAS Perth and USS Houston, and were soon ordered to evacuate to Tjilatjap via the seemingly safe Sunda Strait. That night, the Japanese invasion of Java–the island Tanjoeng Priok lies on–was about to occur. Despite the threat, Evertsen's boilers were offline when the two cruisers left. By the time the destroyer got underway, she was two hours behind her allies. In an attempt to hide, she traveled slowly with one boiler offline to lessen the chance that her smoke was spotted. At midnight, she was sailing in the strait when lookouts reported muzzle flashes in the distance: unknowingly, Perth and Houston had sailed into the Japanese invasion fleet. The destroyer's captain, Walburg Marius de Vries, could tell that his allies were hopelessly outnumbered as they fought more than a dozen Japanese warships. He ordered Evertsen to skirt around Sumatra and try to evade the battle and escape, believing that the destroyer would make no difference by the time she arrived.

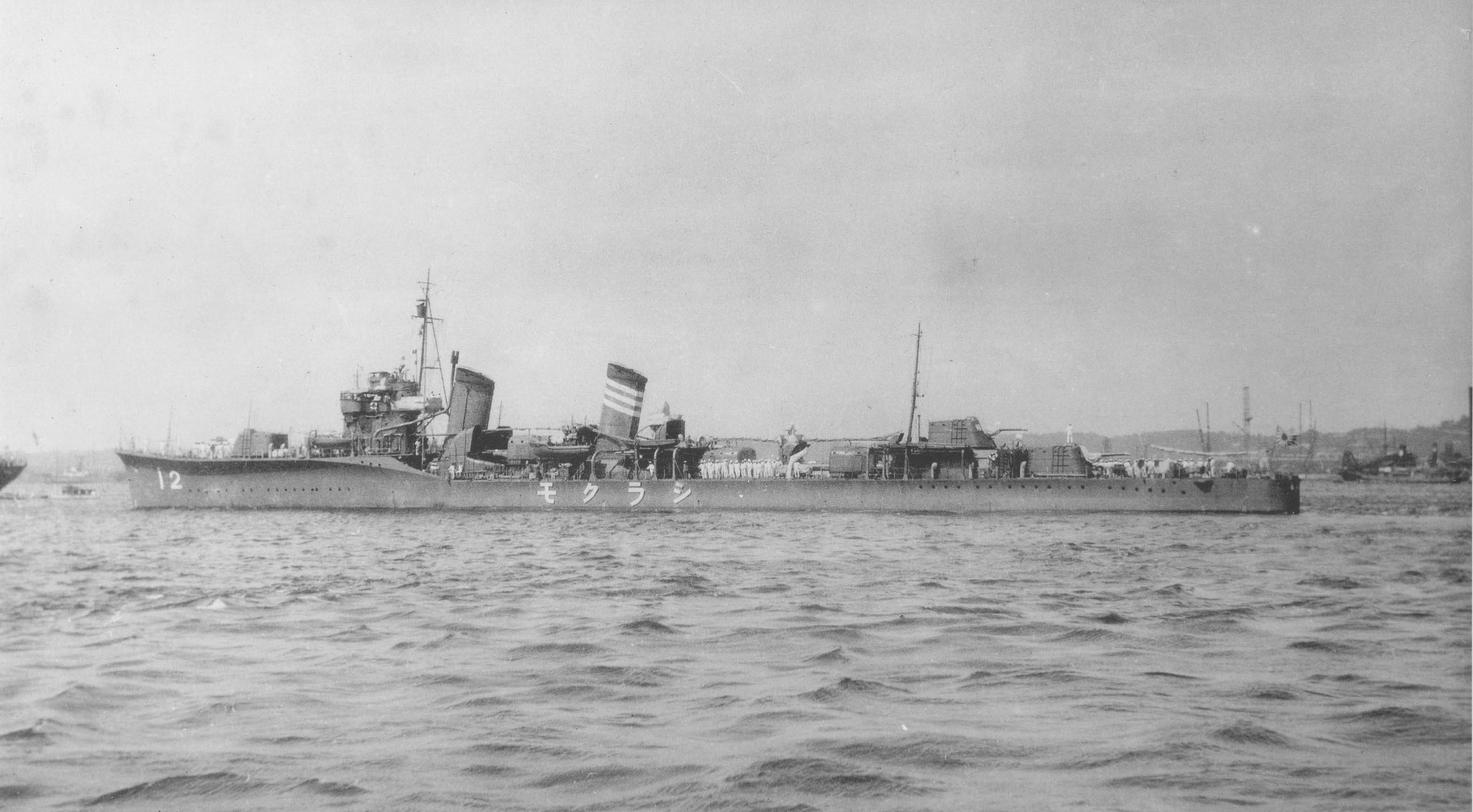
Japanese destroyer Shirakumo, one of the destroyers who crippled Evertsen, seen before the war.

===== Destruction =====
At about 2 AM, Perth and Houston were sunk and the Japanese escorts fanned out to find any other Allied ships. The slow moving Evertsen was noticed by destroyers Murakumo and Shirakumo, who used searchlights to expose the Dutch ship and opened fire. Evertsen was unable to escape and her fire control was quickly destroyed as she attempted to shoot back without success. Several more shells struck her stern, which started a large fire that damage control was unable to extinguish. After a failed torpedo attack, De Vries knew the fire risked detonating the aft magazine and tried to save the crew. He ordered the destroyer to run aground near Seboekoe Besar and the ship to be abandoned. Once on land, the uncontrolled fire detonated the magazine in a devastating explosion that blew off the ship's stern. The remaining sailors ran inland, but were later captured. Out of her crew, 111 survived, and 57 died in either the battle or as prisoners of war.
