= Tanjung Priok Dock of 4,000 tons =

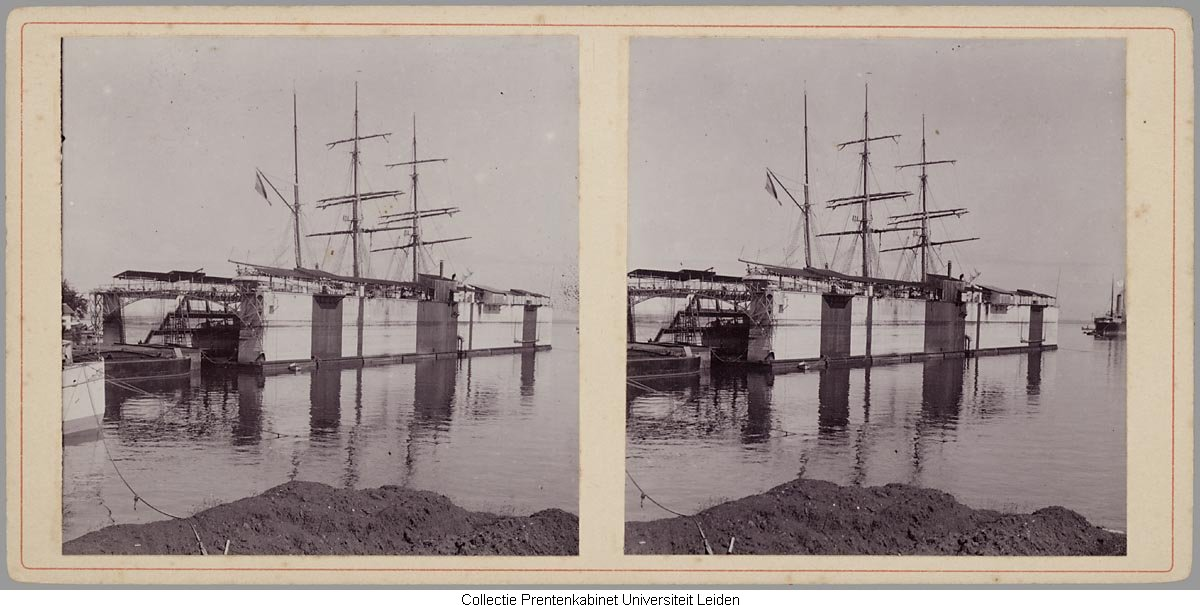
- Tanjung Priok Dock of 4,000 tons lifting the barque John Davie

History

Netherlands
- Name: Tanjung Priok Dock of 4,000 Tons
- Builder: Pletterij voorheen L.J. Enthoven & Co
- Commissioned: 7 October 1896
- Out of service: February 1942
- Stricken: 9 December 1947
- Homeport: Tanjung Priok

General characteristics (as completed)
- Length: 98.5 m (323 ft 2 in)
- Beam: 28 m (91 ft 10 in)
- Depth of hold: 3.75 m (12 ft 4 in)

Tanjung Priok Dock of 4,000 Tons, was a floating dry dock built for Droogdok-Maatschappij Tandjong Priok (dry dock company Tanjung Priok) in the 1890s.

== Context ==
=== No harbor in Batavia / Jakarta ===
The Indonesian capital Jakarta is on the shore of the Java Sea. One therefore expects it to be a port city. This was not the case for most of its history. The East India Men of the VOC and later ships could anchor before Batavia, but any cargo had to be transloaded on smaller ships in order to reach the city. Any repairs had to be done at Onrust Island, where ships could reach the shore, and could careen.

=== The establishment of Tanjung Priok ===
During the nineteenth century Singapore and its excellent harbor and facilities succeeded in attracting much of the trade in and with the Dutch East Indies. The Dutch government wanted to centralize the trade within the colony on Dutch ports. The same applied to the trade between the Netherlands and the Dutch East Indies. Without a proper port this could not be done, because the transloading made trading at Batavia more expensive than trading at other established ports.

In 1877 the Dutch government started construction of a harbor for Batavia at Tanjung Priok (Dutch: Tandjong Priok). This harbor lacked a good repair facility. It had only the small Volharding Dock of the Nederlandsch Indische Droogdok Maatschappij (NIDM) at nearby Amsterdam Island, which was too small for most modern ships. NIDM would try to get concession for the exploitation of dry docks at Tanjung Priok, but would not get it.

=== Droogdok Maatschappij Tandjong Priok ===
In June 1890 the Dutch government made a contract with David Croll to create a repair shipyard and docking facility at Tanjung Priok. Part of the deal was that Croll would lease Onrust Dock of 3,000 tons for 6% of its book value. He would also lease the cylinder dock free of charge. A new dry dock of 4,000 tons, i.e. Tanjung Priok Dock of 4,000 Tons would be built in the Netherlands, and when finished would be leased instead of the 3,000 tons dock. By law of 12 November 1890 this agreement was approved. It would lead to the establishment of the Droogdok Maatschappij Tandjong Priok (dry dock company Tanjung Priok).

=== The three dry docks of the company ===
The Droogdok Maatschappij Tandjong Priok did not want to buy its own dry dock. In view of the disasters that happened to the Batavia Dock of the NIDM, and the Cores de Vries Dry Dock, this is not strange. The Dutch government found an expedient by leasing Onrust Dock of 3,000 tons to the company. This dry dock could lift most ships, and would be used by the company from 1891 to 1896. The company also got the so-called cylinder dock on lease. This was a small dock that could lift about 600 tons, which would have had to be held available for government ships for a number of days each year.

Tanjung Priok Dock of 4,000 Tons would replace Onrust Dock of 3,000 tons. The net effect of this contract would be that a third iron dry dock would appear in the Dutch East Indies. To make this possible, the Dutch government would effectively shield investors from the risk of construction and assembly. Even if private enterprise would build and assemble the dock, the government could ensure that this was done properly. Even so, the contract is puzzling. Why not simply lease out, or even sell, Onrust Dock of 3,000 tons to a private company and build a new 4,000 tons dry dock for the government? A logical explanation for the complexity is in the result. The contract would result in docking facilities for most of the heavy units (Evertsen-class coastal defence ships, Atjeh-class cruisers) of the Dutch Navy in both Batavia and Surabaya. Permanently handing over Onrust Dock of 3,000 tons would result in two heavy docks in Surabaya, which would rarely be needed at the same time.

== Ordering and construction ==
=== Ordering ===
The contract between the state and David Croll specified that the dry dock would be constructed in the Netherlands, and assembled in the Dutch East Indies. On 29 August 1890 a tender gave the order to Pletterij voorheen L.J. Enthoven & Co for 718,803 guilders. There were five other offers, the highest for 927,000 guilders. The required 4,000 tons of iron would be delivered by Wed. A. Brand & Zoon in Dordrecht.

=== Construction ===
In September 1893 the Droogdok Maatschappij Tandjong Priok expected that Tanjung Priok Dock of 4,000 Tons would be ready for transport somewhere in 1894. On 29 March 1893 the queens Wilhelmina and Emma visited the Pletterij, where they were welcomed by CEO H. Enthoven. The work was expected to be ready in a few weeks, even though the contract only demanded delivery in July 1894. One expected to start shipping the dock in July 1894. In October 1894 the dock was reported to be on her way to the Dutch East Indies. While these first shipments took place workers were still busy disassembling the dock in December 1894, when one of them fell from the dock and died.

=== Assembly at Tanjung Priok ===
In October 1894 it was known that the dry dock would be assembled in Tanjung Priok by the Droogdok Maatschappij Tandjong Priok. Assembly would cost 385,000 guilders and be finished in two years. The company would make a substantial profit on this assignment. The government then brought 200,000 guilders on the 1895 Dutch East Indies budget for the assembly. In late March 1895 the last parts of the dock were sent to Tanjung Priok, and by then assembly had started. Assembly was done by riveting the nine parts of the dock, and launching them separately from a slipway.

The final cost for assembling the dock would be 230,000 guilders in 1895. For 1896 163,000 guilders would be requested. By June 1896 Tanjung Priok Dock of 4,000 Tons was almost ready, but the dock pit where she would be stationed was not, and so commissioning would be delayed for a few more months. When all was ready, a trial was held on 7 October 1896, when she lifted HNLMS Tromp.

== Characteristics ==
The size of Tanjung Priok Dock of 4,000 Tons was originally stipulated to be 4,000 tons. The contract determined that it would be self-docking. This meant that it would be built in sections that could lift each other. This would eliminate the need for the very costly operation of towing a dry dock to the dock pit in Surabaya and repairing her there. The dry dock would be constructed so that it could be expanded to a lift capacity of 5,000 tons, in case developments in international shipping would create the need for a bigger dock. Coincidentally, a 4,000 tons dock could lift almost all ships of the Dutch navy, especially the 6 unprotected cruisers of the Atjeh class that formed the backbone of the Dutch navy in the East Indies.

The dock consisted of 9 'pontoons' that were connected with 0.5 distance between them. They were each 10.5 m (34 ft 5 in) long and 28 m (91 ft 10 in) wide. On the side the hold was 3.35 m (11 ft 0 in) in the center it was 3.75 m (12 ft 4 in). Combined these gave a length of (9 * 10.5 = 94.5) + (8 * 0.5) = 98.5 m. The sides were 8.5 m (27 ft 11 in) high, 3.5 m (11 ft 6 in) wide at the bottom and 6 m (19 ft 8 in) wide on the top. The sides held the centrifugal pumps and the tubes that emptied the pontoons. They also held the small machines and tools that were used when a ship was in dock.

== Service ==
=== Early years ===
Activity of Tanjung Priok Dock of 4,000 Tons
Year	Ships	Days	Pontoons
1897	95	398	
1898	93	381	
1899	79	321	
1900	82	365	5
1901	104	395	
1902	126		4
1903	137		6
1904	133		7
1905	116		5
1906	109	373	7
1907	112	332	

On 2 December 1896 SS Prins Hendrik of the Stoomboot Maatchappij Nederland was one of the first ships that made regular usage of the dry dock. Probably after she had hit a wreck.

1897 was the first regular year of operation for the dry dock, and it was also a very good year. One of the highlights of the year was the docking of SS Prinses Sophie of the SMN. This ship and her cargo weighed 5,900 tons. The dock lifted her to the height that the screw could be repaired. Other jobs were on Bantam, SS Billiton and SS Lucifer. The pontoons were painted with coal tar. There was also work for the navy. In April 1897 Tanjung Priok Dock of 4,000 Tons serviced HNLMS Mataram, in June HNLMS Borneo, in July 1897 HNLMS Gedeh, in October Edi, in November 1897 Koningin Emma der Nederlanden, and in December Sumatra.

For 1898 the dry dock company noted that the new dry dock did very well, and that the self-docking system of interchangeable pontoons was very successful. The separate pontoons were lifted/docked in succession, and a schedule of docking one pontoon every three months was established. As regards the Dutch Navy: In early March 1898 HNLMS Koningin Emma docked, later in March HNLMS Atjeh did. In May and June Sumatra and Gedeh docked. In August Sumatra docked again, and in September HNLMS de Ruyter did.

In 1899 activity slowed down. The dry dock was said to be maintained and to continue to answer all demands. In February 1899 HNLMS Sumatra docked at Tanjung Priok. In March Koningin Emma did. In June 1899 the much smaller Sumbawa docked.

In 1900 Prins van Oranje of the SMN was docked, and so were many ships of the KPM. The sailing ships Nest and Ville de Havre were also docked. 1901 would be a record year with 104 dockings for 395 docking days. Of these there was only one foreign ship, the Brantwood. In 1903 the number of ships serviced by the dock rose further, which was made possible by not accepting big repairs.

In 1905 the number of dockings declined a bit because SS van der Parra occupied the dry dock for 35 days. In 1906 activity declined to 109 dockings for 373 docking days. The KPM steamships Maetsuycker, Van Swoll, Swaerdecroon, De Kock, Van Outhoorn and Coen were repaired at the yard. As were SS Claverhill and SS Sultan van Koetei. The sailing ship Rosali d'Ali was also repaired. In 1907 docking activity declined still somewhat further.

=== Combined with a patent slip ===
Tanjung Priok Dock of 4,000 Tons and Patent Slip combined
Year	Ships	Days	Pontoons	Patent Slip
1908	116	331	8	118
1909	112	393	8	260
1910	96	351	9	193
1911	106	283	9	249
1912	101	328	9	237
1913	116	338	9	215
1914	91	350	7	287

Already by 1903 there had been more work than Tanjung Priok Dock of 4,000 Tons could handle. Therefore, the company starting to think of solutions for the busy dry dock. In 1904 the company had obtained a lease on a strip of land where it would establish a patent slip or slip dock where ships of up to 2,000 tons could be pulled out of the water by steam power. In August 1905 the foundations of the patent slip had been started. In 1906 the main parts of the patent slip were ready. In 1907 the patent slip was said to be almost finished. The patent slip would change the operation of the dry dock. Relatively lengthy repairs would be done on the patent slip, freeing up space on the dry dock.

In 1908 was the first year of regular operation for the patent slip, that was used for 118 days. By law of 31 December 1908 the contract between Droogdok Maatschappij Tandjong Priok and the state was changed. The terrain of the company was expanded, and new tariffs for government usage of the dock were determined.

In 1911 the company also built a number of small vessels, and 15 buildings for turning Onrust Island into a quarantine station. A long list of big steam ships was repaired. E.g. the KPM ships Van Diemen, Daendels, St Jacob, Janssens, De Eerens, Borneo and De Kock. Also the steamships Ceram and Karimata.

In 1912 the KPM steamships Mossel, Alting and Houtman were repaired. As well as the Dutch navy ships Ceram, Holland, Java and Hoofdinspecteur Zeeman. Five ships that were not at home in the Dutch East Indies were docked. SS Pontianak of the Rotterdam Lloyd was the most well known of these. In 1913 the main activity of the company consisted of repairs to the KPM steamships Reyniersz, Reael, Van Riebeeck, Van Diemen, Van Outhoorn, Bantam and Siak. The state vessels Brak, Orion and Grethe were also repaired. In 1914 the company was busy with major repairs to four KPM ships and two ships of the Dutch Navy.

=== Sold to Droogdok Maatschappij Tandjong Priok ===
Tanjung Priok Dock of 4,000 Tons and Patent Slip combined
Year	Ships	Days	Pontoons	Patent Slip
1915	107	323	9	309
1916	101	310	9	234
1917	98	302	9	238
1918	96	336	7	313
1919	99	352	5	332
1920	97	348	8	304
1921	150	364	2	362
1922	148	354	7	313
1923	141	339		276

1915 would become a memorable year for Tanjung Priok Dock of 4,000 Tons. On 31 May 1915 the Minister for the Colonies made a new contract with Droogdok Maatschappij Tandjong Priok. The moderate lease of about 3,000 guilders a year for the terrains at Tanjung Priok was in fact a subsidy, and ended. The new lease paid by the company would be about 50,000 guilders. Also the equipment hired from the state would have to be bought by the company. The dry dock was sold to the company for 350,000 guilders by law of 31 July 1915. In the first year that the company owned the dry dock 107 ships were serviced for 323 days. The patent slip was occupied for 309 days.

In 1916 101 ships were docked for 310 days. In 1917 work at the dock was interrupted by a strike. 1918 was a difficult year for the company because import of supplies was problematic. Five foreign ships were docked. The financial results were excellent, dividend was 18%.

In 1919 Tanjung Priok Dock of 4,000 Tons was again very busy, even docking 12 foreign ships. In 1920 the company repaired the KPM ships Van Hoorn, Le Maire, Benoa, De Kock, Van Lansberge and Siborg. Other ships that were repaired were the government ships Glatik and Pelikaan and SS Adolfo Pangani and SS Senang.

In 1921 there was news that Droogdok Maatschappij Tandjong Priok had ordered a new 156 m long dry dock of 8,000 tons at Burgerhout in Rotterdam. It was to be ready in March 1923. The existing dock was very busy. For the first time in many years the maintenance of the dock suffered, with only two pontoons receiving maintenance. 1922 would see a downturn for the company, with the total of wages paid going back by two-thirds. On 14 November 1923 the new Tanjung Priok Dock of 8,000 tons arrived in Tanjung Priok. It was taken in use on 14 December 1923. Meanwhile 1923 was a quite year for the company. The KPM ships Van der Capellen, Daendels, Singaradja, Alting and Van Neck were repaired. Other repairs were those of SS Pharus, SS Zeeman and SS Orion.

=== The small dock (1924–1941) ===
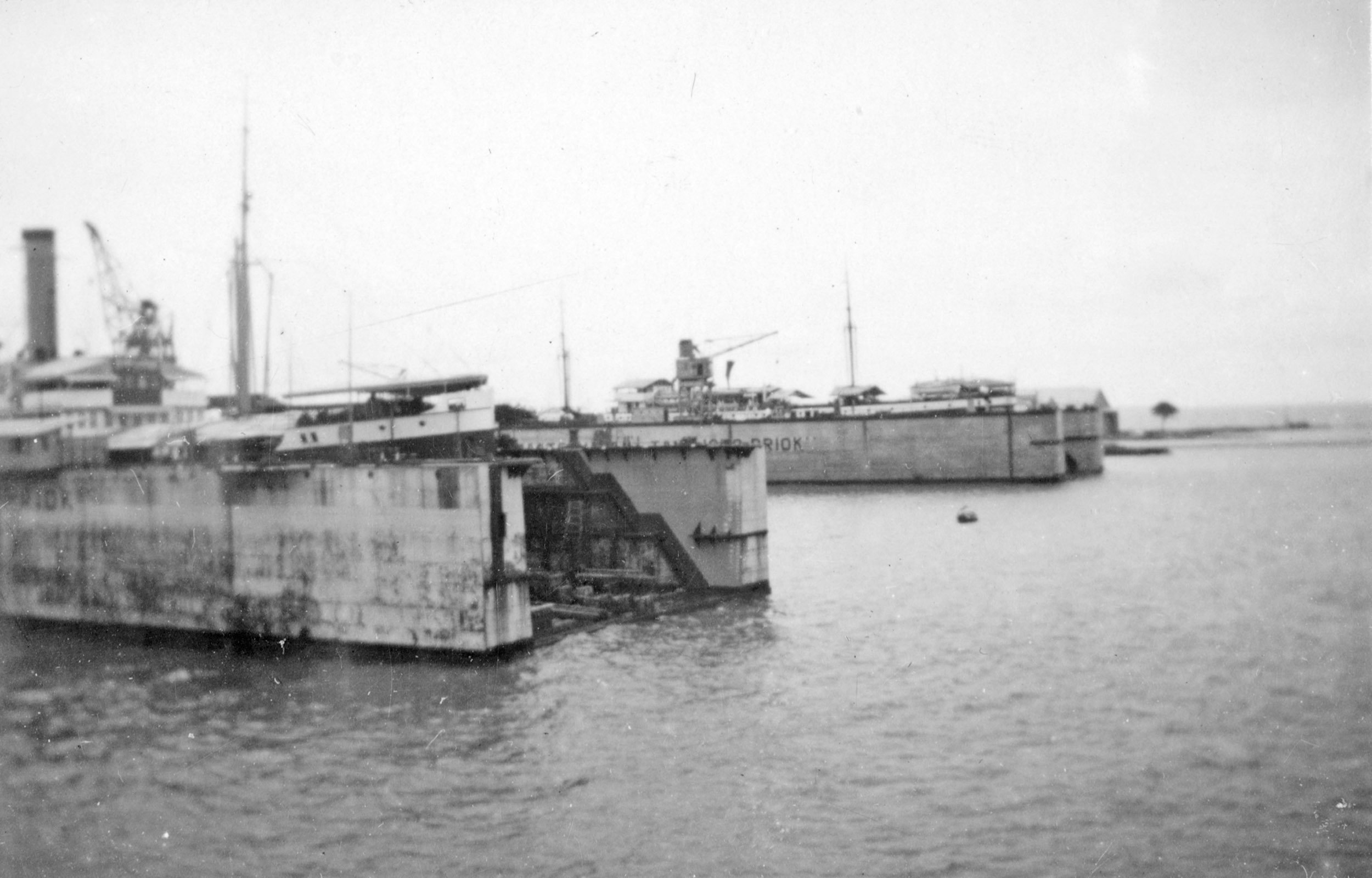
The two docks, that of 4,000 tons is in the foreground, c. 1930-1935

With the arrival of Tanjung Priok Dock of 8,000 tons the 4,000 tons dock had become the small dock of Tanjung Priok. It also coincided with a period of low economic activity. In 1924 the small dock was used by 107 ships for 333 days, while the new dock was used by 72 ships for 221 days. The patent slip was used for 213 days. In 1929 the 4,000 tons dock was used by 106 ships for 331 days. Almost the same number as for the bigger dock In 1934 the small dock was used by 96 ships for 321 days, again almost the same as the bigger dock. In 1938 the dock serviced 91 ships for 320 days. In 1339 this was 92 ships for 292 days. In May 1941 the dock was reported as still in excellent condition.

=== Japanese occupation ===
On 7 December 1941 the Pacific War started. The big Tanjung Priok Dock of 8,000 tons was moved to Tjilatjap. In February 1942 Tanjung Priok Dock of 4,000 tons was sunk on purpose in the harbor before the occupation. On 8 March 1942 the Dutch East Indies surrendered to the Japanese. The Dutch population was interned in camps, meaning that the company was severely hit. After some years the Japanese finally succeeded in lifting Tanjung Priok Dock of 4,000 tons. It is not known whether the Japanese actually used the dry dock. After only a short period she was then sunk again by Indonesian independence fighters.

=== The end ===
After the end of the Japanese occupation, one of the two dry docks (that of 4,000 tons) in Tanjung Priok was indeed seen in a sunken condition. By September 1946 one of the Tanjung Priok docks was reported to be operational again. This was the 8,000 tons dock, Japanese bombs had significantly damaged it. About a quarter of her was damaged irreparably. It had to be cut off and was left behind in Cilacap. It reduced the lift capacity to 6,000 tons.

Tanjung Priok Dock of 4,000 tons was not deemed worthy of repair. On 9 December 1947 attempts to remove the wreck from the harbor commenced. On 3 September 1948 these were finally successful after 40 steel plates had been attached to close all the leaks. On 5 September 1948 the tugboat Asta of the NISM and the Hector started to slowly move her out of the harbor. The intention was to sink the old dock near the island Edam (now Damar Besar). With an increasing wind, and worrying sounds escaping the dock, the tugs then changed course. The dry dock was positioned to be sunk west of the Island Enkhuizen. Here all valves were opened, and the dock started to sink. After 1.5 hours the dock broke in two. At 17:15 the dock had sunk completely.
