= Arendell Parrott Academy =

Private school in Kinston, North Carolina, US

Location
- 1901 Dobbs Farm Road; Kinston, North Carolina 28504; United States; 35°18′46″N 77°36′11″W

Information
- Type: Private
- Founded: 1964 (62 years ago)
- CEEB code: 342067
- NCES School ID: 01011496
- Teaching staff: 63.3 (FTE)
- Grades: K–12
- Gender: Co-educational
- Enrollment: 719 (2015–2016 school year)
- Campus: 55 acres (220,000 m^{2})
- Campus type: Rural
- Colors: Red and royal blue
- Athletics: North Carolina Independent Schools Athletic Association (NCISAA)
- Mascot: Patriots
- Tuition: $12,000
- Website: www.parrottacademy.org

Arendell Parrott Academy is a non-sectarian private school located in Kinston, North Carolina, for grades K–12. The school was the vision of Marion Parrot, a local attorney and state representative. After struggling for a few years to gain support, the untimely death of their son, Arendall, provided the inspiration to Parrott family to open the school. However, their efforts did not come to fruition for several years, when Federally forced desegregation of the public schools created an interest among White Parents to flee to private schools. While there were no Black students, some people linked to the school deny that it was founded as a segregation academy in response to the court ordered integration of public schools, while one founder stated that it was not a choice for Black students.

== History ==
The school was founded by Lillian Parrott and her husband Marion A. Parrott, a former member of the North Carolina General Assembly and attorney. In 1964, the Parrotts, along with several others opened Arendell Parrott Academy, named after the Parrotts deceased son, Marion Arendell Parrott Jr. According to Lillian, "The school was perceived as not being a viable choice for all of the students; it was not integrated." 55 acres (220,000 m^{2}) of land was donated for the school in 1965, and by 1971 the school consisted of kindergarten through twelfth grade.

In 1992, the school became nationally accredited, which meant that colleges and universities considered Parrott's quality of education sufficient to consider accepting students from the academy.

In 2003, the school suffered minor damage from the West Pharmaceutical Services explosion. Many windows burst in and a student was injured by broken glass.

== Demographics ==
In 2010, 90% percent of students were white. In contrast, Lenoir County was only 52% white. Students come from across a ten county area in Eastern North Carolina.

In 2016, the school enrollment was 88% white, while the area population was 57.9% non-white.

In 2018, the school was 95% White.
