= George Parrott =

US Navy officer (1887-1918)

George Fountain Parrott
- George Fountain Parrott, US Naval Academy Yearbook photo, 1911
- Born: December 23, 1887; Falling Creek, North Carolina
- Died: October 9, 1918 (aged 30) Atlantic Ocean
- Allegiance: United States
- Branch: United States Navy
- Service years: 1906-1918
- Rank: Lieutenant Commander
- Units: USS Shaw
- Known for: USS Parrott (DD-218) was named for him.
- Conflicts: World War I
- Awards: Navy Cross
- Memorials: The Missing at the American Cemetery and Memorial section of Brookwood Cemetery in Brookwood, Surrey, England

George Fountain Parrott (23 December 1887 – 9 October 1918) was an officer in the United States Navy during World War I.

== Biography ==
Born at Falling Creek, Lenoir County, North Carolina, George Fountain Parrott was the third of seven children born to George Franklin and Julia Bizzell Parrott, and was first cousin to Marion A. Parrott. His maternal grandfather, Fountain Bizzell, had served in Company G, North Carolina 55th Infantry Regiment. George attended first the Kinston Graded School, then the Rhodes Military Institute, and finally graduated from Oak Ridge Institute in North Carolina. He was able to attend the US Naval Academy after having been appointed from the 2nd North Carolina district by the Hon. Claude Kitchin.

Parrott was appointed Midshipman 3 July 1906 and graduated from the U.S. Naval Academy, class of 1911. He was promoted to the rank of Ensign March, 1912; Lt. Jr. grade March, 1914; Lt. Sr. grade April, 1917; and Lieutenant Commander August, 1918.

He was the executive officer on the USS Shaw (DD–68) in the English Channel. The "Shaw's own ordeal came on 9 October 1918. While escorting the giant British transport, Aquitania, Shaw's rudder jammed just as she was completing the right leg of a zigzag, leaving her headed directly towards the transport. A moment later, Aquitania struck Shaw, cutting off 90 feet (27 m) of the destroyer's bow, mangling her bridge and setting her on fire". Lt. Parrott was killed during the accident. He is a recipient of the Navy Cross and listed on the World War I Honor Roll and on the Tablets of The Missing at the American Cemetery and Memorial section of Brookwood Cemetery in Brookwood, Surrey County, England.

== Namesake ==
USN Parrott (DD-218) was named for him.
