= USS Shaw (DD-68) =

Sampson-class destroyer

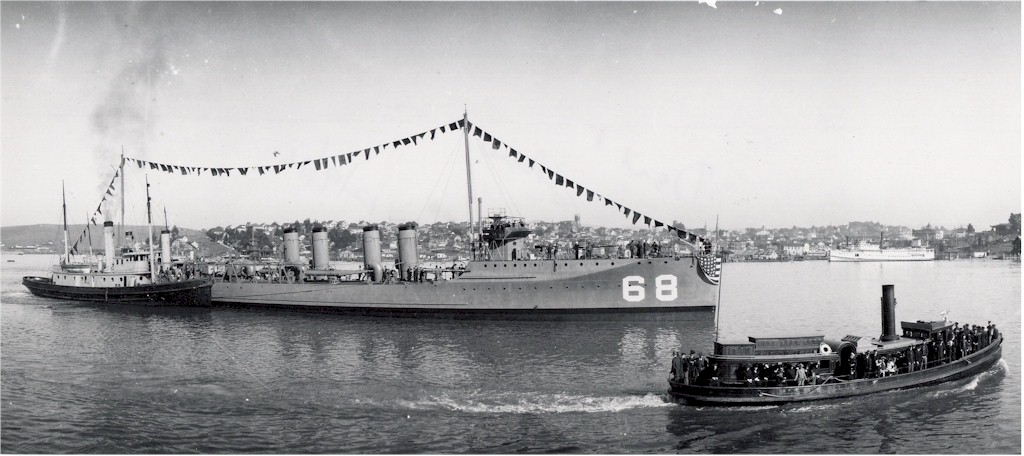
- USS Shaw (DD-68)

History

United States
- Name: USS Shaw (DD-68)
- Namesake: Captain John Shaw
- Builder: Mare Island Navy Yard
- Laid down: 7 February 1916
- Launched: 9 December 1916
- Commissioned: 9 April 1917
- Decommissioned: 21 June 1922
- Stricken: 5 July 1934
- Fate: Transferred to Coast Guard 25 March 1926. Transferred back to USN 30 June 1933 and sold for scrapping 22 August 1934.

United States
- Commissioned: 13 July 1926
- Decommissioned: 5 June 1933
- Fate: Transferred back to USN 30 June 1933.
- Notes: USCG number (CG-22)

General characteristics
- Class & type: Sampson-class destroyer
- Displacement: 1,111 tons (normal), 1,225 tons (full load)
- Length: 315 ft 3 in (96.1 m)
- Beam: 30 ft 7 in (9.3 m)
- Draft: 10 ft 9 in (3.3 m)
- Propulsion: 4 Boilers; 2 Curtis Turbines: 17,696 horsepower
- Speed: 29.5 knots (55 km/h-34.18 mph)
- Complement: 99 officers and crew
- Armament: 4 × 4-inch (100 mm)/50 guns; 2 × 1-pounder (37 mm) AA guns; 12 × 21 inch (533 mm) torpedo tubes (4 × 3)
- Aircraft carried: None
- Aviation facilities: None

USS Shaw (DD-68) was a Sampson-class destroyer in the United States Navy during World War I. She was later transferred to the United States Coast Guard as CG-22.

== Construction and commissioning ==
Shaw was laid down on 7 February 1916 by the Mare Island Navy Yard, launched on 9 December 1916, sponsored by Mrs. Virginia Kemper Lynch Millard, and commissioned on 9 April 1917.

== Service history ==
=== World War I ===
Shaw sailed from Mare Island on 25 May 1917 and arrived at New York on 10 June 1917 ready for distant service. She sailed a week later as one of the escort of Group 4 of the Expeditionary Force from the United States to France. On 26 June, she fueled at sea from a tanker, and the convoy arrived at Quiberon Bay, France, on 1 July. On the 4th, she sailed from St. Nazaire and arrived at Cobh, Ireland, the next day. On 10 July, she began patrol and convoy escort duty based on Cobh, convoying eastbound and westbound ships through the submarine danger zone around Great Britain and Ireland, for the most part without incident. On 1 July 1918, she received an SOS from the torpedoed American transport, Covington, and rushed to her aid. On arrival, she found that Covington's survivors had been removed and the ship had been taken under tow. But, the crippled transport sank later in the day. On 25 September, a ship in Shaw's convoy was attacked by a submarine but not damaged.

On 9 October 1918, while escorting Aquitania, Shaw's rudder jammed just as she was completing the right leg of a zigzag, leaving her headed directly towards the transport. A moment later, Aquitania struck Shaw, cutting off 90 feet (27 m) of the destroyer's bow, mangling her bridge and setting her on fire. Shaw's crew brought her damage under control, and a skeleton crew of 21 men took the wreck 40 miles into port under her own power. Twelve men died in the accident, including Lieutenant commander George Parrott.

Shaw remained under repair at Portsmouth, England, until 29 May 1919 when she sailed for the United States. She arrived at New York on 17 June 1919 and moved to the Philadelphia Navy Yard on 2 October where she joined the reserve destroyer group and was decommissioned on 21 June 1922.

=== United States Coast Guard ===
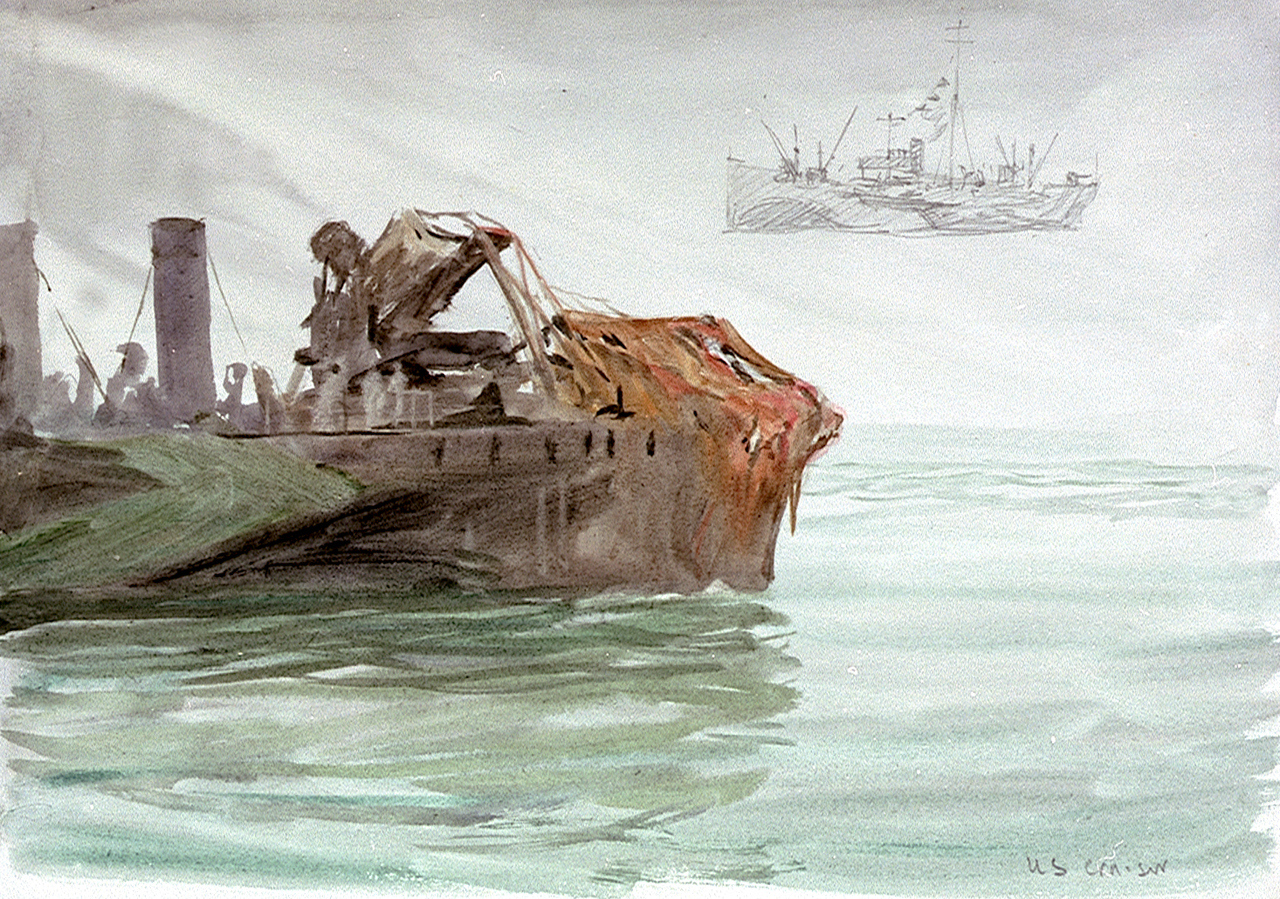
The damaged USN destroyer Shaw at Portsmouth, 1918, and a dazzle-painted armed merchantman

Shaw was struck from the Navy list on 25 March 1926 and transferred to the Coast Guard the same day, to serve in the Rum Patrol. She was returned to the Navy by the Coast Guard and reinstated on the Navy list effective 30 June 1933.

Her name was canceled on 1 November 1933 for assignment to a new destroyer, and the ship was struck again on 5 July 1934 and sold on 22 August 1934 for scrapping to Michael Plynn, Inc., Brooklyn, New York.
