= Tanjung Priok Dock of 8,000 tons =

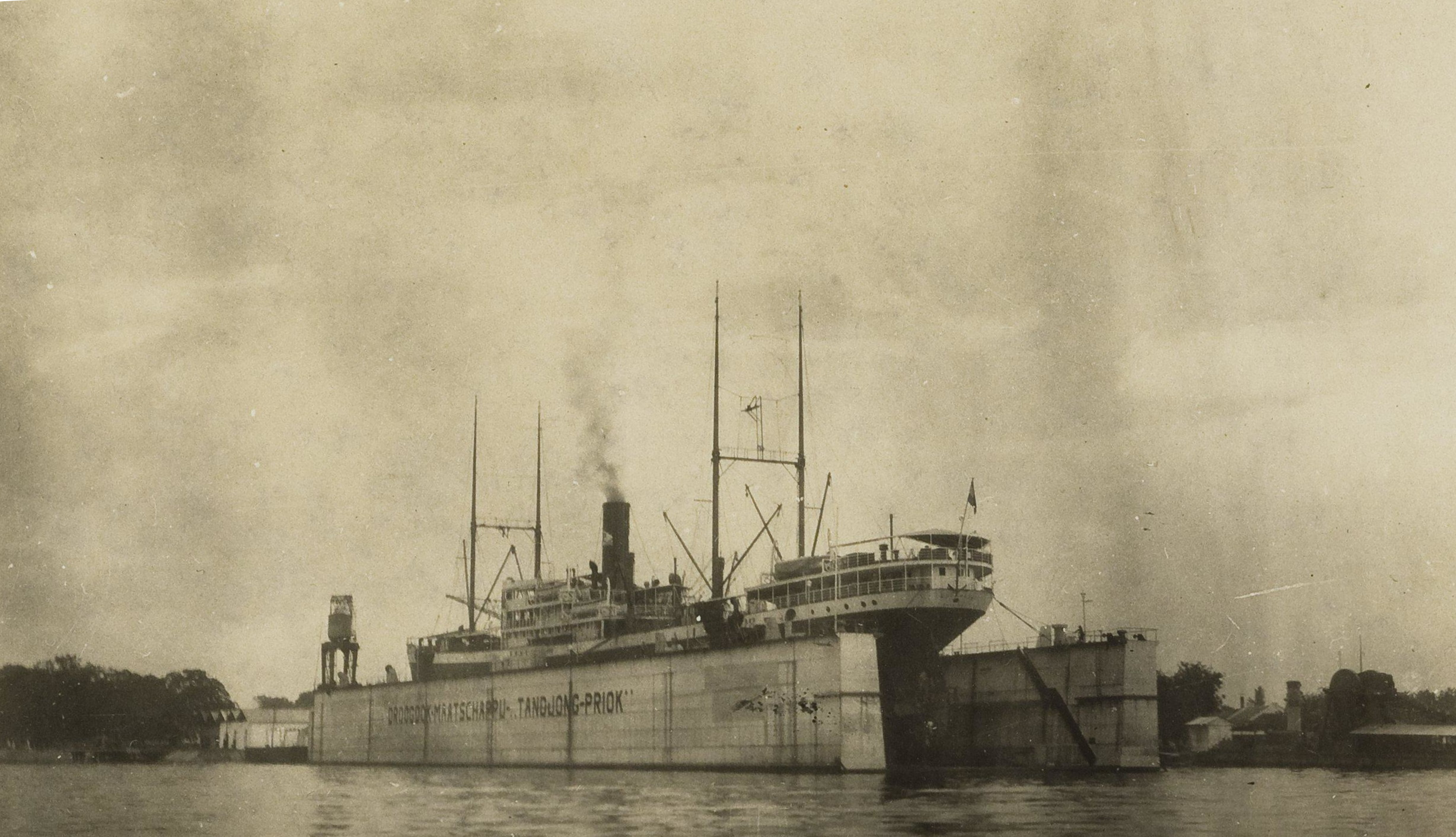
- SS Tjisalak on Tanjung Priok Dock of 8,000 tons

History
- Name: Tanjung Priok Dock of 8,000 tons
- Builder: Burgerhout
- Launched: 10 February 1923
- Completed: June 1923
- Commissioned: 15 December 1923
- Decommissioned: After 1960
- Home port: Tanjung Priok

General characteristics (as completed)
- Displacement: 4,000t(empty); 12,500t(loaded)
- Length: 156.40 m (513.1 ft)
- Beam: 29.00 m (95.1 ft)
- Depth of hold: 3.20 m (10.5 ft)(pontoon)

Tanjung Priok Dock of 8,000 tons was a floating dry dock built for Droogdok-Maatschappij Tandjong Priok (dry dock company Tanjung Priok) in the 1920s.

== Context ==
=== Tanjung Priok, the harbor of Batavia/Jakarta ===
The Indonesian capital Jakarta is on the shore of the Java Sea. For most of its history the 'harbor of Jakarta' was a place at sea where ships anchored, so they could load and unload via smaller ships. This changed when the newly constructed Port of Tanjung Priok (Dutch: Tandjong Priok) was opened 1881–1883. At Tanjung Priok ships could attach to a quay. The idea was that when the expensive transloading was no longer needed, the competitive position of Batavia would be strengthened.

=== Droogdok Maatschappij Tandjong Priok ===
Tanjung Priok at first lacked a good repair facility, especially a dry dock. The repair shipyard of the Nederlandsch Indische Droogdok Maatschappij (NIDM) at nearby Amsterdam Island had Volharding Dock, but this was too small for most modern ships. The combination of a small dock and little traffic made that NIDM went into liquidation in 1884. The Maatschappij tot Exploitatie van Droogdokken en Scheepstimmerwerven in Nederlands-Indië then continued the business at Amsterdam Island into 1891. Just like her predecessor it failed to get the concession for exploiting drydocks in Tanjung Priok, and left Amsterdam Island in 1893.

What the Dutch government wanted, was to have a modern dry dock at Tanjung Priok. This required new capital that the public would not invest in the existing companies. In June 1890 it then made a deal that led to the establishment of the Droogdok Maatschappij Tandjong Priok (Tanjung Priok dry dock company). Part of the deal was that this company would lease Onrust Dock of 3,000 tons. It would also lease the cylinder dock free of charge. A new dry dock of 4,000 tons, i.e. Tanjung Priok Dock of 4,000 tons would be built in the Netherlands, and then be leased by the company instead of the 3,000 tons dock.

The Tanjung Priok dry dock company was an almost immediate success. In the company's first few years Onrust Dock of 3,000 tons was rather busy. After it started to use Tanjung Priok Dock of 4,000 tons in 1896, there were many years that this dock had more than 365 docking days a year. In 1904 the company got a patent slip of 2,000 tons. When the agreements with the government had to be renegotiated in 1915, government support ended, and the 4,000 tons dock was bought by the company for 350,000 guilders.

== Ordering and construction ==
=== Ordering ===
World War I was a happy period for Tanjung Priok dry dock company. In 1914 profit was 124,622 guilders, in 1915: 384,950, in 1916 185,402, in 1917 487,500, and in 1918 an astonishing 867.370 guilders. This trend continued in 1919 with a profit of 902,687, and over 1920 716,536 guilders These profits resulted in very high dividends for the shareholders. Nevertheless, by 1921 the company had a huge amount of cash available to invest.

On 3 December 1921 the order for Tanjung Priok Dock of 8,000 tons was placed at Burgerhout shipyard in Rotterdam. In relation to this order Droogdok Maatschappij Tandjong Priok emitted a loan of 1,000,000 guilders in bonds at 7%. The new dry dock would be 156 m long and would be able to lift 8,000 ton. It was claimed that it could also lift big ships like the Coen and Patria. It was to be ready in March 1923. The price was about 2,500,000 guilders, because it was on the balance sheet of 1923 for 2,509,526 guilders.

=== Construction ===
For construction of the drydock Burgerhout shipyard cooperated with Hamburger Dockbaubüro of Paul Matthiessen and Max Müller, who also designed the dock. On 17 October 1922 the first part of the drydock, consisting of four pontoons, was launched. On 10 February 1923 the second part of the dry dock was launched. The shipyard did not make the planned end date in March 1923, because the plans were later changed to include a power station.

== Characteristics ==
Tanjung Priok Dock of 8,000 tons was 156.40 m long overall. The pontoon deck was 146.40 m long. The beam was 29 m and the internal width on the pontoon deck was 21.4 m. The pontoons had a hold of 3.2 m. The sides were 10 m high. The 8,000 tons regarded the displacement of the ships which the dock could lift. The weight of the dock itself would be 4,000 ton. The maximum displacement would be 12,500 ton with a freeboard on the pontoon deck of 30 cm, which is what will happen if one puts a ship of 8,000t displacement on top of one of 4,000t: the combination will displace 12,000t.

The dry dock was self-docking. Each of the seven pontoons could be disconnected and be replaced by the reserve pontoon. After turning the disconnected pontoon 90 degrees, it could then be lifted by the dock. Meanwhile, the sides of the dock would stay in place. Each pontoon was divided in three parts, with the center part acting as air chamber. The amount of water in the side chambers could be regulated to make an exact fit during replacement of pontoons. The replacement operation was expected to be finished in 12 hours. It was an arrangement suited to the tropical circumstances, which required each pontoon to be maintained once a year. The reserve pontoon made it possible to delay actual maintenance till it could be lifted together with a ship which did not require the whole length of the dock.

The main pipe which was used for emptying the pontoons was placed in one of the sides, so it always stayed intact. Four electricity driven pumps of 400 hp were placed in the same side. Each had a capacity to pump 40,000 liter of water a minute The power would be enough to raise a ship of 8,000 ton weight in two hours. It also had the power station, and air compressors to drive tools were also placed in this side. On top of the sides there were two cranes that could each lift 5 tons.

The power station was added to the plans during construction. This was not the most obvious way to supply power to the dry dock, because a power station on land could be used for multiple purposes, e.g. powering two drydocks. Anyway the power station consisted of three big Diesel generators supplied by Mirrlees, Bickerton & Day. Each had 250 hp and they drove three 250 kVA generators supplied by Electrotechnische Industrie v/h Willem Smit & Co. The rest of the electrical installations was supplied by Siemens-Schuckert drydock construction from Hamburg.

== Service ==
=== Passing the Meuse bridges ===
Near disaster as the dock passes the Meuse bridges in 1923

On 17 June 1923 Tanjung Priok Dock of 8,000 tons was planned to pass the Meuse bridges in Rotterdam. It would then be pulled to Batavia. Authorities and engineers were aware that passing the bridges could be problematic. The dock had a basic height of 13.20 m, and on top of it there were some deckhouses that were another 4 m high. A model of the riverbed was made by Burgerhout, and a model of the dock was combined with it to make calculations.

Smit International was to get the job done with 8 tugboats. The idea was to arrive before the railway bridge Willemsspoorbrug at 11:30 AM. Once there the top of one of the deckhouses would be removed. The dock would then be lowered till a draught of 6–8 m in order to pass under the railway bridge. After that, it would be lowered till a draught of 11–12 m to pass the (old) Willemsbrug. After that, the reserve pontoon would be pushed into the dock, and it would be pumped back up to its normal height.

On Sunday 17 June thousands had gathered near the bridges to view the spectacle. Press and camera were present, and there was even an airplane to do some aerial photography. At noon the two tugboats in front of the dock pass under the railway bridge, and the dock dives under it. Suddenly the current then grabs the dry dock, and push it sideways. The front of the dock is then a bit under the railway bridge while the rear is almost against the north shore of the Meuse. All tugboats present were then immediately pressed to pull back the rear. It was to no avail; even while 13 tugboats pulled, the drydock stayed put. The floating shearlegs Albatros was then brought upstream to remove the wooden deckhouse. Near three o'clock the tugs lost control for a moment and had to start all over again in their attempt to straighten the dock. The incoming flood then helped, and at 3:40 PM, the dock started to move again. At 4:00 PM, the dock was below the railway bridge. The sea tug Achilles was then able to help, and at 4:15 PM, the front of the dock was below the Willemsbrug.

Next the dock was solidly stuck in the bed of the Meuse. The sea tug Argus, which could not pass the bridges, joined in as the 15th tugboat. By seven o'clock the dock had progressed some dozens of meters. At 8 PM the dock was below both bridges, the stern under the railway bridge, and the bow under the Willemsbrug. At 11 PM it was still in the same place. All night long the tugs then pulled and pushed. Obstacles on the southern side of the dock were hastily cut off at 4:00 AM, so the dock could be brought up a bit. Finally, somewhat past 8 o'clock in the morning of the 18th, the dry dock came free of the bridges. In the end, it had passed the bridges at precisely the planned place. At 10 o'clock Tanjung Priok Dock of 8,000 tons was in the Waalhaven, where the pontoon would be loaded, the final deckhouses be fit, and the dock made ready for sea. Later an unexpectedly strong current from the old harbor was blamed for the mishap before the railway bridge, which made the whole plan go awry. Later the total damage was estimated at 30,000 guilders.

=== Tugged from Rotterdam to Batavia ===
Tanjung Priok Dock of 8,000 tons now had access to open sea, but still had to be brought to Batavia. After a thorough inspection, and after all preparations had finished, the dock left the Nieuwe Waterweg on 12 July. She was pulled by two ocean-going tugs. Humber (ex Atlas) of 520 ton and 1,500 hp had captain Willem Verschoor, overall commander of the expedition, and navigator T. Vet. Poolzee of 300 ton and 750 hp was captained by Van der Hoeven, who had his nephew Van der Hoeven as navigator. The dock itself was commanded by dockmaster Strijbos. On board Humber the radio telegraphist Mr. Spruit would send letters about the voyage. The journey was expected to take four months. On 13 July the ships were 10 miles west of Beachy Head. On 16 July they were 50 miles south west of Start Point, Devon. On 20 July they were at 46°38′0″N 8°25′0″W On 24 July they were 60 miles from Vigo. On the 27th they were at the altitude of Cabo da Roca. On 2 August the convoy was 60 miles east of Cabo de Gata On 4 August the ships were near Algiers. On 10 August they were near Cape Bon (Tunesia). On 13 August the convoy was 70 miles east of Malta. On 16 August they were at 34°23′0″N 20°30′0″E.

On 24 August Humber and Poolzee entered Port Said towing Tandjong Priok. On 28 August they continued their voyage. On 30 August they passed Suez. On 8 September the ships were at 19°0′0″N 39°30′0″E in the Red Sea. On 13 September they passed Perim in the strait of Mandeb, exiting the Red Sea. On 15 September the dock was near Aden, where the tugs bunkered in turn. On 17 September the convoy left Aden again. On 20 September they were 125 miles west of Cape Guardafui. On 26 September they were 77 miles east of Socotra. On 2 October the convoy was at 9°4′0″N 63°2′0″E On 8 October they were 130 miles west of Minicoy. Near Minicoy the convoy was overtaken by SS Rindjani. She had Mr. D. Croll CEO of the Droogdok Maatschappij on board, and Rindjani thus searched for and found the dry dock.

On 14 October the convoy was near Colombo, where the tugs bunkered in turn. On 16 October they left Colombo. On the 18th they were 30 miles south of Galle. On 30 October the dock passed Sabang, Aceh. On 14 November 1923 Tanjung Priok Dock of 8,000 tons arrived before Tanjung Priok after a journey of 125 days. Humber then pulled the dock into the harbor of Tanjung Priok. Poolzee pulled the dock to the pit, where it was fastened by 8 big and heavy anchors. On 30 November the Governor General then visited the dock. The importance of the dock and its transport was signaled by captains of the tugs and dock getting introduced to the Governor General.

=== Regular service ===
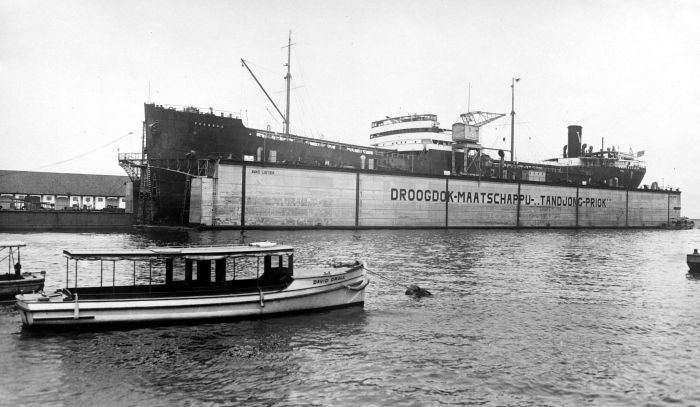
Tanker MS Pegasus from Sweden on the dock

Ships in TP docks and on Patent Slip till 1930
Year	8,000t dock	Days	4,000t dock	Days	Patent Slip
1923	3	8	141	339	276
1924	72	221	107	333	213
1925	53	260	105	317	206
1926	82	275	83	295	133
1927	92	283	92	320	236
1928	106	330	104	306	266
1929	99	320	106	331	257

On 15 December 1923 SS Arakan was the first ship to be docked. Meanwhile, the port of Tanjun Priok was in a severe economic downturn in 1923. This downturn continued in 1924, when the new dock was used by 72 ships for 221 days while the 4,000t dock was used by 107 ships for 333 days, and the patent slip was used for 213 days. Only in 1925 did business pick up again, leading to a profit of 156,222 guilders. In 1926 business improved, but profit declined to 70,114 guilders In 1927 this continued, with profit only moderately increasing to 119,256. Only in 1928 did the increased lead to an increase in profit which was seen as good at 145,850 guilders. In 1929 activity in the docks led to a further increase in prices and profit rose to 187,765 and a dividend of 12%. It is furthermore interesting that the 1,000,000 loan issued for purchasing the dock had been reduced to 340,000 guilders by the end of 1929.

Ships in TP docks and on Patent Slip 1930-1942
Year	8,000t dock	Days	4,000t dock	Days	Patent Slip
1930	119	329	109	342	301
1931	95	313	94	314	199
1932	76	266	95	313	176
1933	85	315	83	300	150
1934	88	327	96	321	214
1935	78	296	84	320	138
1936	86	301	84	294	319
1937	79	300	87	327	254
1938	84	305	91	320	239
1939	94	322	92	292	252
1940	?	?	?	?	?
1941	?	?	?	?	?

The first full year of the great depression was 1930. The drydock company was not bothered too much at first. The shipyard was still busy, though profit decreased a bit to 160,576 guilders. In the second year 1931, the company had way too much work, but it still made a profit of 53,482 guilders. In 1932 the situation became problematic with a loss of 152,070 guilders In 1933 the situation further deteriorated to a loss of 240,009 guilders, even though cost cutting was effective. In 1934 the situation somewhat improved because of work for the oil industry. The loss was 77,696 guilders In 1935 a profit of 24,469 guilders was made, but this was largely due to not depreciating assets.

In the last few months of 1936 the tide started to turn for the drydock company. Profit over 1936 was 32,055 guilders and depreciation was at 147,108, an almost regular amount. In 1936 the company also got a regular slipway to build new ships. In 1937 the turnover of the company indeed doubled and the number of employees tripled. Profit was determined at 64,033 guilders, even though the operational result had improved by about 255,000 guilders In 1938 the company started construction of Poolster of 1,600t, the largest ship built in the Dutch East Indies up to that date, profit over 1938 was 136,399 guilders. In February 1939 Poolster was launched, profit over 1939 was 196,154 guilders.

In May 1940 the Rotterdam headquarters of Droogdok Maatschappij Tandjon Priok came to lie in enemy territory. Somewhat later, the company still made an annual report (which should probably have been complete when the Germans invaded), but now the Dutch East Indies grabbed control of the local parts of the company. The company, now headquartered in Batavia, then held an annual shareholders meeting in Batavia on 13 November 1940.

The company now became even busier than before, especially with orders for the navy. An order for a minelayer of 2,300t and 4,800 hp had already been placed in April. In April 1941 an expansion of the terrain of the company by a stretch of 70 by 30 m was decided upon. On 12 May 1941 the company celebrated its 50-year jubilee. In July 1941 the company decided to build a new shipyard in Semarang together with the Droogdok Maatschappij Surabaya. Here simple freighters of up to 10,000 tons would be constructed. In September 1941 the annual shareholders meeting in Batavia agreed to a dividend of 10%.

== Japanese occupation ==
On 7 December 1941 the Pacific War started. Tanjung Priok Dock of 8,000 tons was moved to Tjilatjap. On 8 March 1942 the Dutch East Indies surrendered to the Japanese. The Dutch population was interned in camps, meaning that the company was severely hit.

== After World War II ==
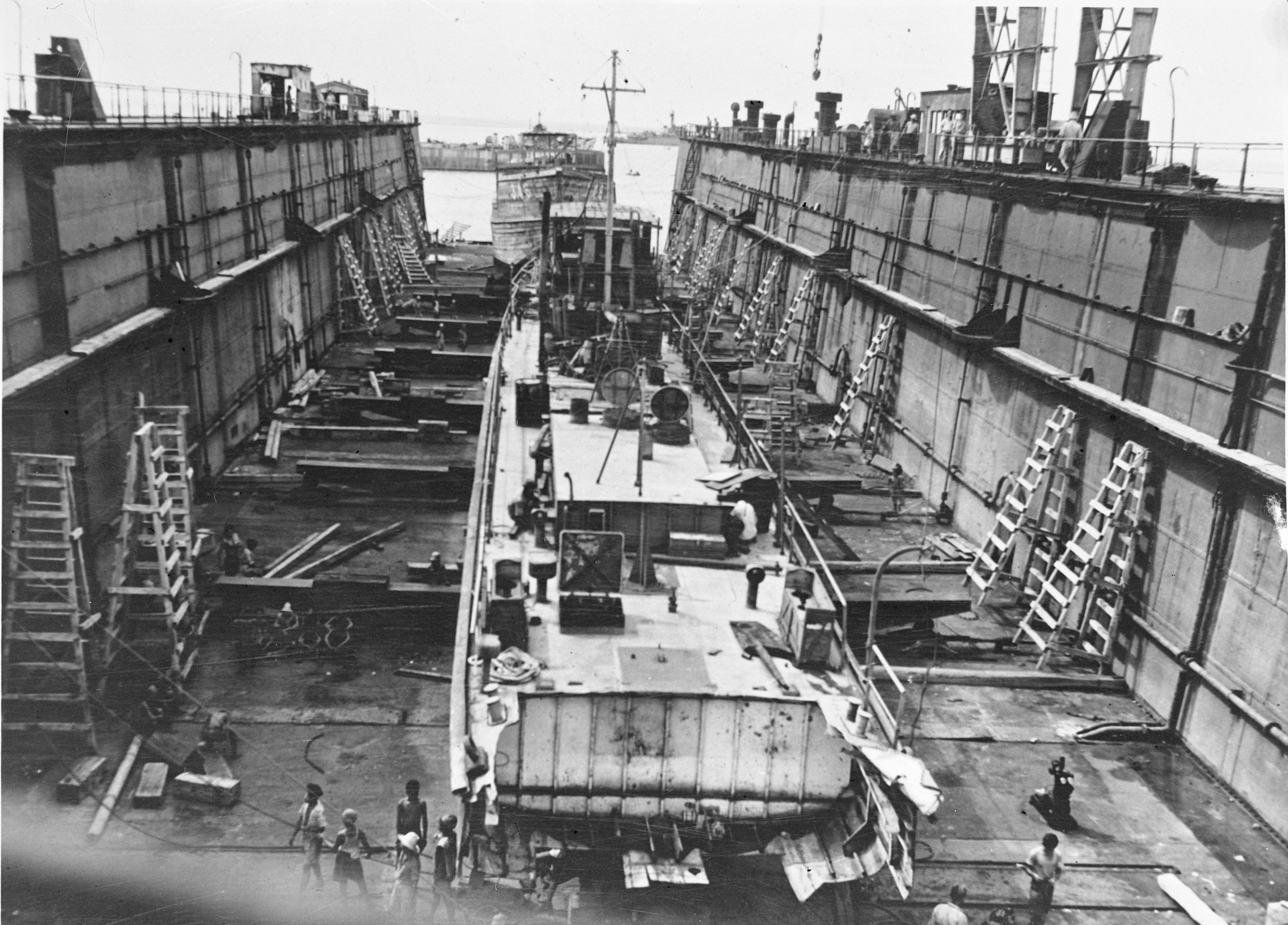
Tanjung Priok Dock of 8000 tons in September 1946

After the end of the Japanese occupation, one of the two dry docks (that of 4,000 tons) in Tanjung Priok was observed in a sunken condition. By September 1946 one of the Tanjung Priok docks was reported to be operational again. This was Tanjung Priok Dock of 8,000 tons, Japanese bombs had significantly damaged it. About a quarter of her was damaged irreparably. It had been be cut off and left behind in Cilacap. It reduced the lift capacity to 6,000 tons.

In 1960 Tanjung Priok Dock of 8,000 tons, capable of lifting 6,000 tons, was reported to be in poor but serviceable condition. Its length was 444 ft (135.3 m), inner width 70 ft (21.3 m) (matches), and maximum draught of visiting ships was 24.50 ft (7.5 m). The original length over the pontoon decks was 146.40 m (480.3 ft). If one supposes that one pontoon was lost in the war, i.e. 480 /7 = 68.5, the resulting after the war should have been 513 - 68.5 = 445 feet, which indeed matches with the 1960 observation.
