= Marion A. Parrott =

American lawyer (1918–2000)

Marion Arendell Parrott
- Born: August 23, 1918
- Died: October 27, 2000 (aged 82)
- Occupation: Lawyer
- Known for: Founder of Arendell Parrott Academy

Marion Arendell Parrott (August 23, 1918 – October 27, 2000) was an American lawyer.

== Early years and wartime activities ==
Marion Arendell Parrott was the second son of William Thomas and Jeanette Johnson Parrott from Kinston, North Carolina, and a first cousin to George Parrott. Parrott graduated in 1939 from The Citadel, The Military College of South Carolina, and then from the University of North Carolina School of Law. He served during World War II as a paratrooper with the United States Army 101st Airborne Division. He took part in the Battle of Normandy early on June 6, 1944 (D-Day). Two weeks later, he was captured in northern France, and imprisoned in Szubin, Poland. On Christmas 1944, he escaped from the prison camp made his way to Russia. From there he returned to his unit in France and took part in the final advance into Germany at war’s end, at which point he was discharged as a Major.

== Career ==
Parrott was a former member of the North Carolina General Assembly, where he was chairman of the Committee on Constitutional Amendments. Parrott was the first president of Arendell Parrott Academy, which he also co-founded as a segregation academy in 1964. The school was named for his son who died in 1961.

He also served as a director of the Pioneer Fund from 1973 to 2000.

He was unsuccessful in convincing Tom Waring, a South Carolina journalist, to found a newspaper to compete with the Raleigh News & Observer.
