= HNLMS Piet Hein (1927) =

Dutch Admiralen-class destroyer (1928–1942)

Coordinates: 8°40′S 115°20′E

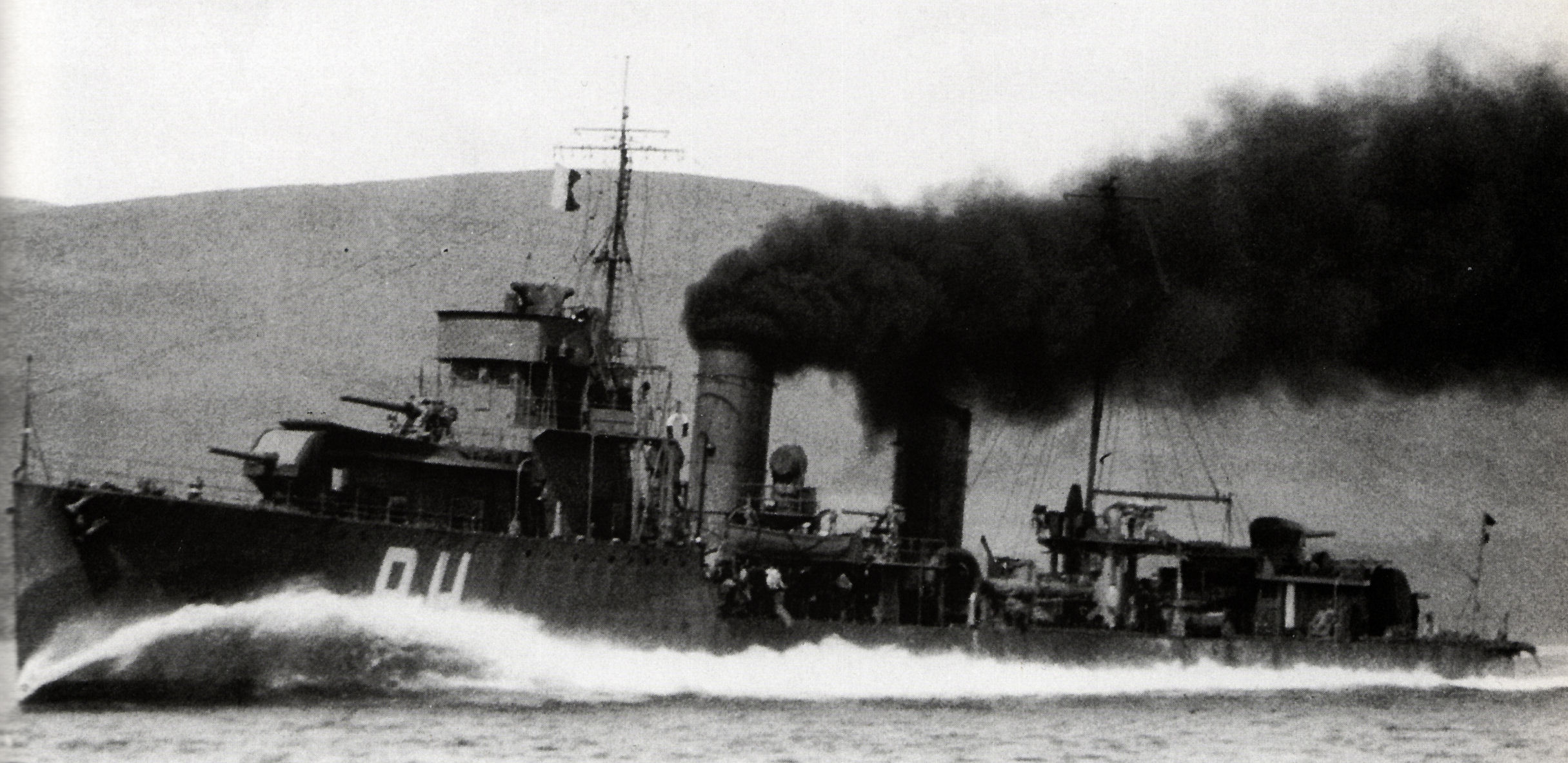
- HNLMS Piet Hein at full speed off the Dutch East Indies in 1937

History

Netherlands
- Name: Piet Hein
- Namesake: Piet Pieterszoon Hein
- Builder: Burgerhout, Rotterdam
- Laid down: 26 August 1925
- Launched: 2 April 1927
- Commissioned: 25 January 1929
- Fate: Sunk, 19 February 1942

General characteristics
- Class & type: Admiralen-class destroyer
- Displacement: 1,310 long tons (1,331 t) standard
- Length: 98.15 m (322.0 ft) oa; 93.57 m (307.0 ft) lbp
- Beam: 9.45 m (31.0 ft)
- Draft: 3 m (9.8 ft)
- Installed power: 31,000 hp (23 MW)
- Propulsion: 3 × Yarrow boilers; 2 × turbines; 2 × shafts
- Speed: 36 knots (67 km/h; 41 mph)
- Range: 3,200 nmi (5,900 km; 3,700 mi) at 15 kn (28 km/h; 17 mph)
- Complement: 129
- Armament: 4 × 4.7 in (120 mm) guns (4×1); 2 × 3 in (76 mm) AA guns (2×1); 4 × 1.3 cm (.5 in) machine guns; 6 × 21 in (533 mm) torpedo tubes (2×3); 24 × mines
- Aircraft carried: 1 × Fokker C.VII-W floatplane
- Aviation facilities: 1 × Davit

HNLMS Piet Hein was an Admiralen-class destroyer operated by the Royal Netherlands Navy between 1928 and 1942. She was designed to also serve as a minelayer, and spend most of her career in the Dutch East Indies. During the Dutch East Indies campaign of World War II, the destroyer joined an Alied fleet in several attempts to repulse Japanese invasions. In one such attempt, during the Battle of Badung Strait, Piet Hein became isolated from her fleet and exchanged fire with the Japanese destroyer Asashio. In the ensuing engagement, she lost electrical power and became immobile. Afterwards, she was torpedoed and quickly sank.

== Development and design ==
During the early 20th century, the primary goal of the Royal Netherlands Navy was the defense of the resource-rich and economically vital Dutch East Indies. By the end of World War I, wartime advancements in marine engineering and naval architecture—particularly in submarines and aircraft—left the neutral Dutch Navy technologically behind its European counterparts. In the postwar period, the Navy planned for a rapid modernization and studied the equipment of other nations while designing a new class of destroyers.

Simultaneously, the British Royal Navy held a design competition for its first postwar destroyers. One of the designs, HMS Ambuscade, built by Thornycroft, impressed Dutch officials. The Netherlands subsequently adopted a modified version of this design for service in the East Indies, where Japan was increasingly viewed as the most significant threat. Compared to the British design, the Dutch version was slightly slower and had a reduced range in exchange for a more powerful anti-aircraft armament and the inclusion of a reconnaissance seaplane. The design became known as the Admiralen-class destroyer, as every ship was named after a Dutch 17th century admiral. The eight destroyers in the class were divided into two subgroups: the first four, including Piet Hein, were equipped for minelaying, while the latter four displaced slightly more and furnished with minesweeping equipment.

=== Characteristics ===
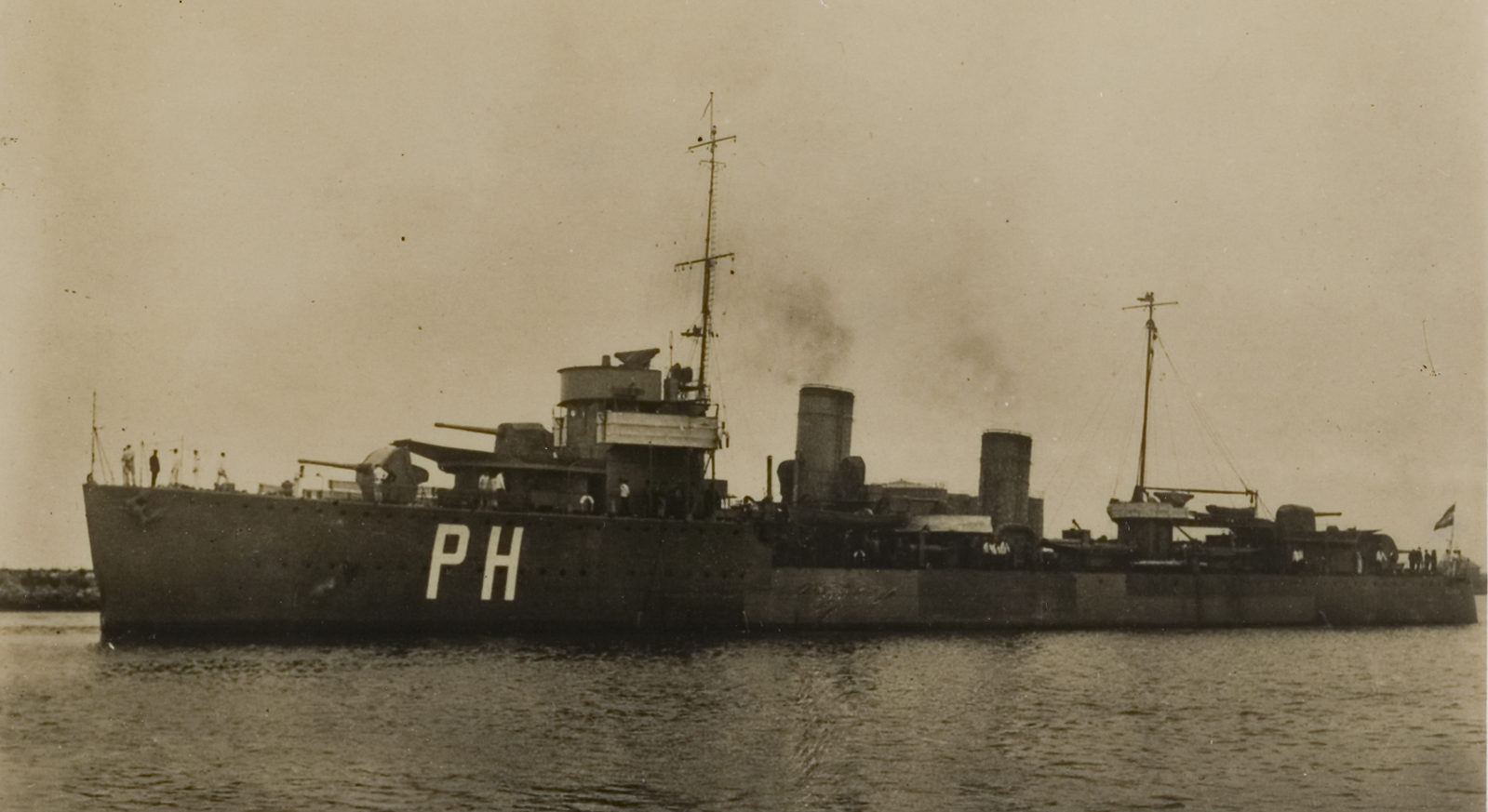
Piet Hein anchored off the Netherlands in 1935

News reel of Piet Hein taken from the port of Rotterdam on a trial voyage

The ships' primary armament consisted of four single-mounted Bofors 12 cm (4.7 in) guns—two forward and two aft—with only two of the mounts protected with gun shields as designed. Two 7.6 cm (3 in) guns mounted between the funnels and four 1.3 cm (.5 in) machine guns provided anti-aircraft defense. A distinctive feature of the class was a floatplane platform mounted above one of the two triple 53 cm (21 in) torpedo tube mounts. The aircraft, a Fokker C VII-W, was used for reconnaissance as the many islands in the Indonesian archipelago made locating enemy vessels difficult. The minelaying destroyers were 98.15 m (322 ft) long, had a beam of 9.45 m (31 ft), had a draught of 3 m (9.8 ft), and a displacement of 1,310 long tons (1,331 t). They were propelled by three Yarrow boilers that produced 31,000 shaft horsepower (23,000 kilowatts) and turned two propellers for a top speed of 36 knots (67 km/h; 41 mph). The ships could carry 24 mines and were manned by a crew of 129.

== Service history ==
=== Peacetime ===
She was laid down on 16 August 1925 by Burgerhout and was launched on 2 April 1927. On 25 January 1928, she was commissioned and named Piet Hein, after the 17th century admiral of the same name. Over the next decade, the destroyer continued to operate out of the East Indies alongside other Dutch vessels. Her work in Asia was uninterrupted by the invasion and capitulation of the Netherlands in 1940.

=== Dutch East Indies Campaign ===
Following the bombing of Pearl Harbor and Japanese attacks on British Malaya, the Dutch government-in-exile declared war on Japan on 8 December 1941. Over the next two months, Japan's rapid advances across Southeast Asia overwhelmed the region's Allied naval forces. In an effort to coordinate resistance, elements of the Australian, British, Dutch, and American navies formed American-British-Dutch-Australian Command (ABDACOM): an ad hoc command that brought together each nation's available ships under a (nominally) unified structure. One of ABDACOM's first steps was the formation of an offensive fleet–the Combined Striking Force under the command of Karel Doorman–that composed of a mix of American and Dutch cruisers and destroyers, including Piet Hein and several of her sisterships.

==== Battle of Makassar Strait ====
The Striking Force's first offensive action was on 4 February 1942. Doorman aimed to intercept the invasion of Makassar City and deny the Japanese control of the Makassar Strait. Without air cover, the fleet was detected by Japanese reconnaissance aircraft. While off the Kangean Islands, more than 50 Nells and Betty bombers attacked the fleet. The destroyers were ignored and went unscathed, although the American light cruiser Marblehead was crippled and the heavy cruiser Houston lost a turret. The air attack forced Doorman to call off the mission.

==== Battle of Badung Strait ====
Japan's next target was Bali. The Allies knew the fall of Bali would directly threaten ABDACOM's bases on Java, and that an immediate response was needed. A force to counterattack was assembled, but due to time constraints, the Allies were unable to coordinate a unified strike. Instead, the operation was planned in several waves. The plan for the first wave called for the cruisers De Ruyter and Java attack the invasion force's escorts at night and draw them away, thus leaving the transports vulnerable to a follow-up attack by Allied destroyers. On the night of 19 February, the battle began when De Ruyter found the destroyers Asashio and Ōshio escorting a transport off Bali. After catching the Japanese by surprise, the cruisers opened fire. However, limited communication and poor visibility prevented the ships from hitting each other. After ten minutes, Doorman believed the destroyers were sufficiently damaged and took the cruisers north, and hoped that he was followed.

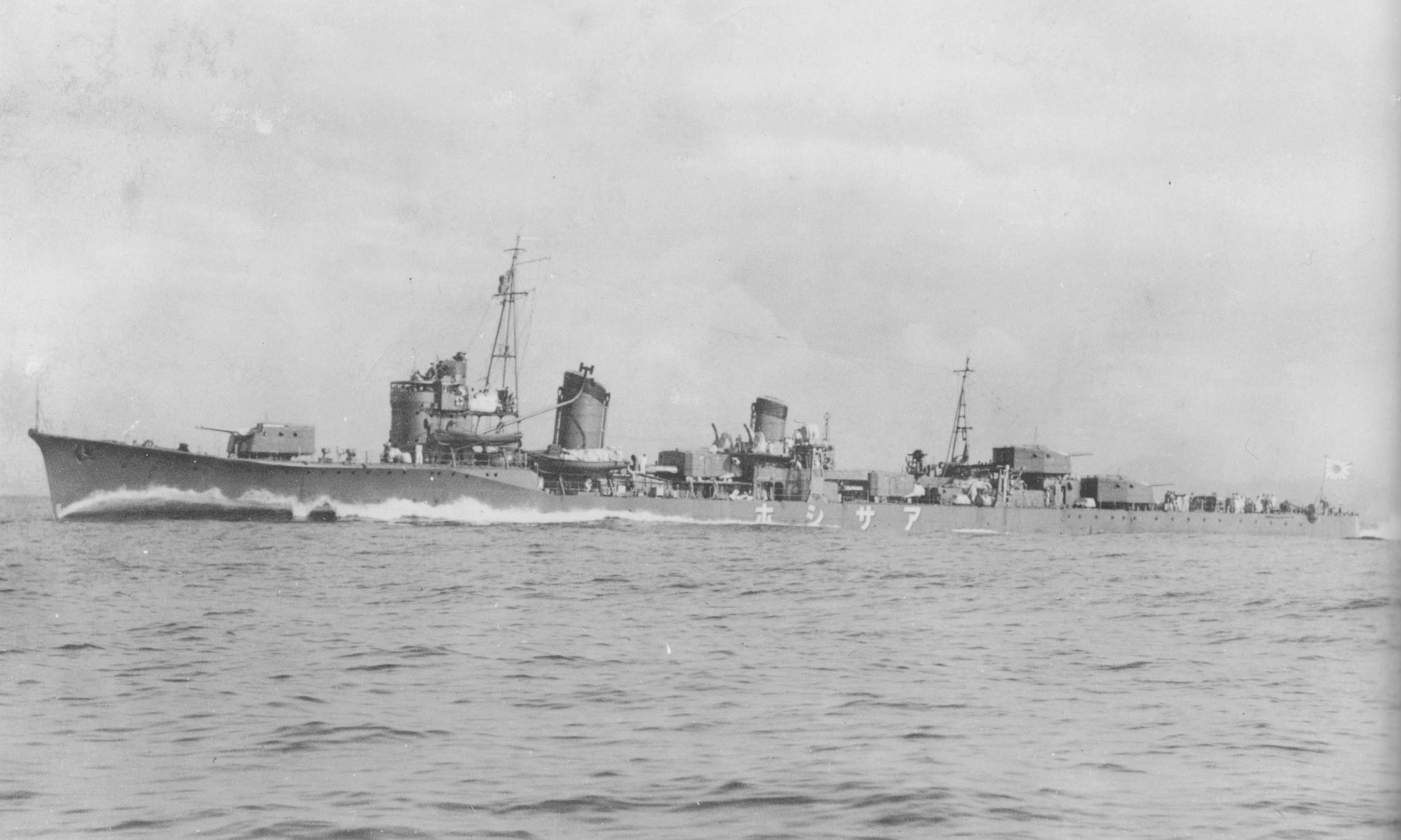
Japanese destroyer Asashio crippled and sunk Piet Hein in the Badung Strait.

===== Sinking =====
As the cruisers withdrew and the destroyers closed in, Piet Hein sailed alone between the two groups. She laid a smokescreen for the American destroyers John D. Ford and Pope as they engaged the transport ships, leaving the Dutch destroyer isolated. In the darkness, Piet Hein exchanged fire with Asashio. One shell severed a pipe, disabled a boiler room, and knocked out electrical power, while another destroyed a searchlight platform and ignited a fire that further revealed her position. Without power, Piet Hein was left immobile as the two Japanese destroyers closed to a range where they could use their anti-aircraft guns. The volume of fire quickly overwhelmed the destroyer's defenses. At 11:37 PM, Asashio fired a spread of torpedoes, one of which struck Piet Hein on the port side.

The destroyer quickly sank and her crew was thrown into the water. By chance, 13 survivors found an empty motorboat that fell off Ford during the battle and used it as an ad-hoc lifeboat. The next morning, the group found a drum of gasoline Pope previously jettisoned to prevent a fire. With fuel to power the boat, the survivors rescued 20 more and sailed to Java.
