= Burgerhout =

Dutch company

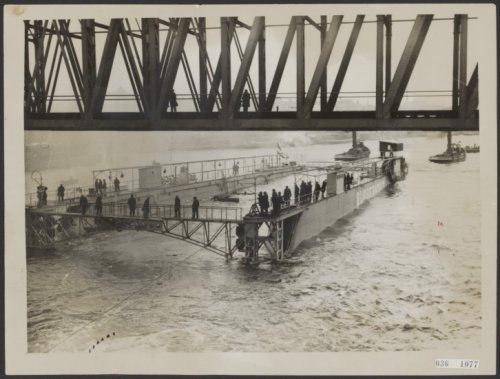
- Navy drydock of 3,000 tons in Rotterdam
- Industry: Machines, Shipbuilding
- Founded: 1852
- Founder: H.A. Burgerhout (1825-1913)
- Defunct: 1932
- Headquarters: Rotterdam

Burgerhout was a Dutch company in Rotterdam, active from 1852 to 1932. In 1865 it became a machine factory. In 1909 it started to build ships and in 1927 it branched out to the aircraft industry.

== Predecessors ==
Burgerhout was preceded by the smithies of Kramer and Steigerwald. In 1772 Jan Kramer, smith and 'maker of spits' was mentioned in the Zwanesteeg at Leuvehaven, Rotterdam. On 10 February 1818, smith Jan Kramer died at age 83. His daughter Cornelia Kramer, widow of J.H. Steigerwald then announced that her son J. Steigerwald would continue the business. On 22 January 1848 Jan Steigerwald died. His obituary held a note that the affairs would be provisionally continued 'in light of the size of the business inside and outside of the city'.

In February 1848 there was an agreement that S. Bouwmeester and O. Grunzig would continue the company under the name ('firma') J. Steigerwald. At the time it produced anchors and made products for shipping, mills, households and carriages. It also repaired and built all kinds of steam engines. Smith Samuel Bouwmeester and steam engine manufacturer Otto Grunzig then made an association by contract to regulate their affairs. The idea was not successful, and so the society between Bouwmeester and Grunzig was ended by 31 July 1849, with Bouwmeester handling the remaining business.

== Foundation ==
In September 1852 Hendrik Adolph Burgerhout (1825–1913) took over Bouwmeester's smithy in the Zwanensteeg at Leuvehaven, Rotterdam. Burgerhout announced that he would continue the business under his own name, and that it still made household, shipping and mill work. It also made hearths, stoves, ship- and household kitchen stoves, and safes. It is likely that the less than successful takeover by Bouwmeester and Grunzig set back the company. The fact that Burgerhout's advertisement did not mention work on steam engines might be related to such a setback.

Burgerhout would prove more successful. By 1853 he was recruiting skilled workers. In 1855 he won a tender for making galvanized iron roofs over 8 gunboats in Hellevoetsluis naval base at 7,669 guilders. In 1858 Burgerhout won a tender for the iron part of a bridge over the Rotte for 10,097 guilders. The bridge was 30 m long and 7 m wide. In spite of these successes the company continued to be a large smithy. It might work on steam boilers, and do repair work, but in 1857 it was not classified as a machine factory.

== Machine factory Burgerhout & Kraak (1865–1877) ==
On 1 November 1865 Hendrik Adolph Burgerhout and Arie Kraak founded the company (Dutch: Vennootschap) Burgerhout & Kraak. Its goal was the construction and repair of (iron) ships, steam engines, boilers, iron bridges, and other big iron constructions. The association would last at least until 31 December 1877.

=== Bridges ===
Burgerhout & Kraak continued to attract orders for bridges and other large constructions. In February 1866 it won a tender for an iron swing bridge near the Witte Leeuw for 5,394 guilders. In January 1867 the company won a bid for renewal of the Leuvebrug for 22,533 guilders. It consisted of a fixed iron part and an iron swing bridge. In 1869 Burgerhout & Kraak got the assignment to repair the 'Nieuwe Leuvebrug', which included a lock.

=== Steam engines for river navigation ===
The machinefactory of Burgerhout & Kraak was on Leuvehaven. In 1869 the factory of Burgerhout & Kraak was mentioned as being on the Houtlaan (Hout street). The Houtlaan was south of the Zalmhaven, i.e. the front door of the shipyards on the Zalmhaven was at the Houtlaan. In 1870 a big fire at Zalmhaven almost reached the 'Machinefactory de Maas' of Burgerhout & Kraak. Indeed, Zalmkade No 10 was next to their 'Grofsmederij'.

Burgerhout & Kraak seems to have specialized in small steam engines for river vessels. One of its first engines was one of 10 hp with a 16 hp boiler. The company repeatedly advertised it in 1866. This machine probably evolved to a proper engine of 16 hp. In October 1869 the company had the order to build the 16 hp machines for the iron river ship Maria en Johanna, under construction at Fop Smit. After that Burgerhout & Kraak was repeatedly mentioned as building 16 hp engines for ships.

== Machine factory Burgerhout & Son (1878-1909) ==
=== The Burgerhout's sole proprietors again ===
In January 1878 H.A. Burgerhout made a contract with his son Jan Burgerhout (1852–1900) to continue the activities of Burgerhout & Kraak as the company Burgerhout & Son (Dutch: Burgerhout en Zoon). By the end of the 1880s, Burgerhout was a major employer in Rotterdam. In December 1889, 70 employees of Burgerhout did not turn up because of a strike.

=== Expansion in river navigation ===
Burgerhout continued to specialize in machines and boilers for river navigation. In time it outgrew the very basic small steam engines it made. In 1882 it got order for a machine of 30 hp. In 1893 Burgerhout build two compound machines of together 80 hp for Dieu Donne V. In 1894 it built the engines of the steamtug Loreley I and the passenger liner Reserve III for the Maas and IJssel Line in Rotterdam.

Burgerhout now grew from a simple constructor (copier) of steam engines to a company capable of designing engines and even ships. In 1901 Burgerhout was involved in the design of the Johann Knipscheer XV. It was a river paddle steamer of 10 m long, 18.60 m wide, a draft of only 1.07 m and 800 hp engines. As regard construction Burgerhout only built the boilers for this vessel. Burgerhout was also involved with the double screw river steamer Max Honsell, of 82.9 m length.

=== Tugboat service ===
In the 1880s Burgerhout & Son also ran a tugboat service. From 1885 to 1887 the tugs Burgerhout, Burgerhout II and Burgerhout III were noted on the Rhine, and these were not all of the ships of Burgerhout's tug service. Burgerhout's tugboat service had of course always used Burgerhout engines. The vessels themselves however, had been built by others. E.g. in 1907 a steel tugboat was launched for Burgerhout at the shipyard of H. van Vlaardingen in Gouda. While in the same year Boele in Slikkerveer was constructing Wacht am Rhein III for Burgerhout.

== Burgerhout Shipyard and Machinefactory ==
=== New shipyard at Varkenoord ===
By 1909 a new shipyard was under construction for Burgerhout at Varkenoord (somewhat upstream from Fijenoord on the southern shore of the Meuse). The shipyard was considered advanced for multiple reasons. It was a parallel slipway instead of a perpendicular slipway. It was made of 21 concrete short patent slips built like aqueducts. The whole was supported by 1,700 piles. The most visible parts were 2 kilometers of rails and a kilometer of chains, all used to move the 21 carriages by which a ship was pulled out of the water. Every 'slip' had a winch that could pull 12.5 ton. Four 25 hp electro engines drove the winches via an axle that run along the slip.

The new slipway could handle a ship of up to 120 m long, but the idea was to simultaneously handle two Rhine ships or six tugboats. More capacity was available by shoving a ship from the carriages to some blocks. A ship could be taken out of the water in about 30 minutes. One of the unique advantages of the slipway was that it was far safer in handling very weak ships (like sand barges). The traditional perpendicular patent slip puts great strain on the hull when part of the ship is out of the water, and part of it is still floating on the water. With the spectacular increase in the length and beam, but not in the draft of river vessels, these became ever weaker. In a few years the whole company was moved to the new location.

=== Public Company ===
In 1910 Burgerhout became a public company. The capital was 500,000 guilders divided in 500 shares, 300 of them placed. The official name became Burgerhout's Machinefabriek en Scheepswerf. The first CEO was H.A. Burgerhout jr. The change to a public company might also have been related to ensuring the continuity of the company. H.A. Burgerhout junior died on 2 January 1911 at age 49. On 10 January 1911 his widow M.W. Burgerhout-Molenaar and his eldest son H.A. Burgerhout (1886–1932) became executive officers, while Hugo Burgerhout became vice president. H.A. Burgerhout studied at ETH Zurich.

=== Further expansion ===
By 31 December 1909 Burgerhout had 9 tugboats under construction, 8 for German customers, and one for an English customer. The tug for the English customer was Kurt van Andreae, 35.5 m by 6.25 m with a 2.7 m hold. The machinery was a vertical triple expansion engine of 525 ihp. Kurt van Andreae was the first ship completely built by Burgerhout.

Despite these big investments Burgerhout seems to have stuck to its niche market: tugboats and specialty vessels. On 31 December 1911 Burgerhout had 5 tugboats under construction. On 31 December 1912 it had a sea tugboat under construction, as well as a number of pontoons for South America and other vessels. Among the vessels that Burgerhout had under construction on 31 December 1913 was a cargo steam boat of (436 GRT).

=== World War I ===
World War I was a bonanza for the Dutch shipbuilding industry and a lot of other industries. For Burgerhout, this was not immediately the case, because transport on the Rhine was severely affected by the war. Burgerhout thus had to shift to building seaworthy ships, but this was easier said than done. In 1915 Burgerhout launched only two tugboats and two ocean-going tugs.

The turning point came in 1916, when Burgerhout launched the steam freighters Boekelo, Amstel, Loosdrecht and Eva of 1,700–3,000 GRT. In 1917 Burgerhout launched four comparable steam freighters. In 1918 Burgerhout slowed down like the rest of the industry and only launched two steamtrawlers and a sea tug. Apart from building ocean going ships, Burgerhout was also involved in designing them. It furthermore built a lot of steam engines for other shipyards. The number of employees rose from 80 in 1910 to about 1,000 in 1921.

== Post war glory years ==
=== Post war boom and bust ===
After World War I most companies believed in a bright future. In the shipping industry they also had a lot of cash to invest. By the end of 1918 Burgerhout had 8 freighters from 1,200 to 6,250 GRT under construction. Four ships of 6,250 GRT were for the shipping line Solleveld, Van der Meer en Van Hattum's Stoomvaart-Maatschappij, which even participated in Burgerhout's capital to ensure it would get enough ships. Meanwhile, Burgerhout took a loan of 1,000,000 guilders at 7% in mid 1920.

For shipping the international bust started about January 1921, when freight prices dropped so low that they were no longer profitable for most shipping lines. Scheepvaart Maatschappij Oranje Nassau then cancelled Graaf Jan (2,500 GRT), on order at Burgerhout. Burgerhout then sold it to Australia as SS Poolta for half the original price. Together with Lingedijk (6,750 GRT) for Solleveld, this was all Burgerhout launched in 1921. Two more 6,750 GRT ships for Solleveld, a 2,750 GRT motor ship for Van Ommeren and two tugs remained 'on the ways'. In 1924 Burgerhout had a serious lack of orders.

=== Burgerhout Nobel diesel engine ===
In 1918 the Nobel family established the Nobel-Diesel company in Nynäshamn, Sweden. By 1921 it had built a 1,600 hp four cylinder two-stroke direct reversible Diesel engine. It had a fuel efficiency of over 80%, better than any other two-stroke engine. Many factories bought a license for this engine. E.g. Mirrlees, Bickerton and Day in the United Kingdom, Nydqvist and Holm in Trollhättan, Niigata Diesel, and Burgerhout. Nobel-Diesel itself closed down in 1925.

In November 1924 Burgerhout became the first Rotterdam firm to reveal a Diesel engine. It was a four-cylinder two-stroke reversible engine of 900 ehp at 94 turns a minute. The maximum number of turns was 105 a minute. Notable features where the accessibility of the moving parts, the relatively light construction of these and the smooth operation of the engine. Fuel consumption was about 185 grams per axle-hp per hour.

In 1926 Burgerhout sold its first diesel engine for the English Black Sea which was re-engineered to diesel propulsion. While Burgerhout sold quite some Burgerhout-Nobel diesel engines, it took a license to produce Werkspoor diesel engines in 1930.

=== Floating drydocks and engineering ===
On 3 December 1921 Burgerhout received the order for Tanjung Priok Dock of 8,000 tons. It was a floating dry dock for the Port of Tanjung Priok near Jakarta (then Batavia). She was finished in June 1923. That same month Burgerhout got an order for a 4,500 tons floating drydock for the harbor of Valparaíso in Chile. This was finished in May 1924.

=== Doors for the IJmuiden lock ===
A project related to dock construction was the construction of the lock doors for the new lock in the North Sea Canal. The new lock (now called north lock) was to be the biggest in the world, measuring 400 × 50 × 15 m, and to be completed in 1929. The three doors of the lock were 53.5 m wide, 20 m high and 8.4 m thick. In January 1925 Burgerhout won the order for three doors and a 'closing pontoon' for 310,000 per door, at a total price of 995,000 guilders. The work on these doors would last three years.

On 29 January 1929 the first 1,200 ton lock door was christened by Mrs. van de Vegte-Visser, wife of the minister for Waterstaat. After launch the door was tugged downstream. The trip to IJmuiden was an event that attracted a lot of attention. The tugs Drente (1,300 hp), Brabant (1,200 hp) and Vlaanderen of Wijsmuller would bring the door to open sea. With a beam of 20 m and a draft of 6 m, it proved unexpectedly difficult to tug the door. At one time the tide even pushed it back upstream. Therefore, the commander decided to keep Vlaanderen involved in the transport to IJmuiden, and called in Nestor and Stentor from there. The tow then progressed along the coast at only three knots an hour. Near IJmuiden the convoy was joined by Hector and Junior, and finally it was moored in a canal to await the further completion of the lock. In late May the first door was placed in the lock. On 14 July 1927 the second door was launched. On 5 June 1928 the third door was launched by Burgerhout.

=== Destroyers ===
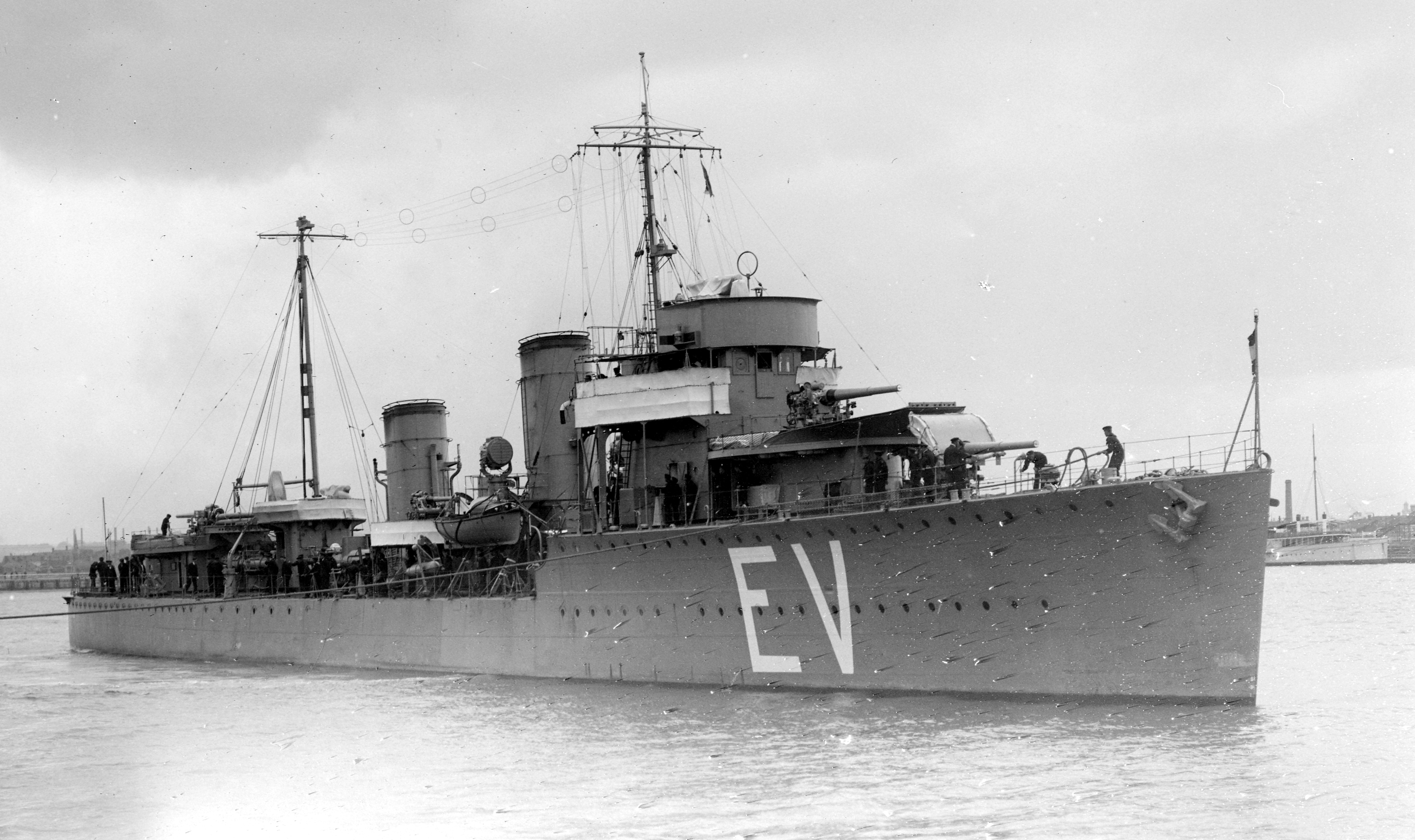
Destroyer Evertsen

In late 1924 and early 1925, Burgerhout won a tender for three Admiralen-class destroyers, Evertsen, Kortenaer and Piet Hein. Burgerhout subsequently delivered the three destroyers, despite being a company new to shipbuilding.

On 15 August 1928 Burgerhout laid down the destroyers Banckert and Van Nes of the same class.

=== Shipbuilding recovers ===
In 1926 Burgerhout launched only the destroyer Evertsen and some small barges, even though it had a lot of work in progress. In 1927, Burgerhout launched the destroyers Piet Hein and Kortenaer, the drydock of 3,000 tons for the navy, and two lock doors for IJmuiden. It also built two triple expansion machines of 240 hp. Which left on the ways and on order: three destroyers, one lock door, five hopper bargers, a motor tanker of 7,000 GRT and one of 10,000 GRT. Over the book year 1927 Burgerhout paid a dividend of 6%.

In 1928–1929 many shipyards somewhat recovered, but for Burgerhout the financial results were not good. In 1928 Burgerhout delivered three destroyers and laid down two others. It also delivered the navy drydock, and launched MS Alexandre Andre of 7,000 GRT, 5 hopper barges and one lock door. Profit over 1928 was 33,517 guilders. On 1 January 1929 Burgerhout had only 1 motor tanker and two destroyers, as well as two Burgerhout-Nobel engines and four steam turbines in progress. The leadership predicted a bad year for the company. Meanwhile, Burgerhout had bought adjacent terrains, and invested in renovation and enlargement of the slipways In 1929 Burgerhout launched the small MS Tidore for KPM. It delivered MS Belgian Gulf of 10,000 GRT. Near the end of 1929 Burgerhout got an order for a 2,600 GRT motor tanker for Anglo-Saxon Petroleum. As predicted the financial result over 1929 was bad, with a profit of only 2,561 guilders.

== Aircraft ==
=== Hosts precursor of Koolhoven ===
Hendrik Adolph Burgerhout (1886–1932) was twice involved with the aircraft industry. By March 1922 the company NV Nationale Vliegtuig Industrie (NVI) of Mr. Carley was temporarily housed on the shipyard. It was incorporated somewhat later. On 15 December 1922 a fire significantly damaged the aircraft production facilities and some other parts of the shipyard. NVI then bought a new factory building in The Hague.

=== Burgerhout founds Aviolanda ===
In 1927 Maatschappij voor Vliegtuigbouw Aviolanda NV was founded by H.A. Burgerhout and Shipyard Gebroeders Pot in Bolnes. It acquired the lease for the terrain of Shipyard vh de Weduwe A. v. Duyvendijk in Papendrecht. All this suggests that H.A. Burgerhout was primarily involved as a private person, but in fact the shipyard had previously acquired machinery and staff to produce aircraft. The first order for the new company was the construction of 18 Dornier Do J 'Wal' flying boats. The order would give employment to 100–150 people. The order for the Dornier 'Wal' was followed by others, and when Burgerhout Shipyard was discontinued, the separate company Aviolanda survived. After World War II it was merged into Fokker.

== The end ==
=== Increasing losses ===
1929 saw the start of the Great Depression in October. In early 1930 Burgerhout still got an order to build a motor tanker of 11,500 GRT for Anglo-Saxon Petroleum. What was remarkable was that it would license build her Werkspoor engine as well as those of a number of English motor tankers ordered at the same time. In 1930 the work in progress continued to decline, with only the 11,500 GRT motor tanker, four Burgerhout-Werkspoor engines, a steam engine, another engine and 5 boilers in progress on 31 December 1930. By then the company still employed 1,100 people. In light of the inability to get profitable orders, the supervisory board announced that a reorganization with participation by the shareholders and bondholders was necessary.

In 1931 Burgerhout's business did not improve. The work in progress was valued at 1,345,890 guilders at the start of the year. This was totally inadequate to generate enough revenue to pay for cost and deprecation which had been 1,294,361 in the previous year. In December 1931 it became known that Burgerhout and P. Vervat would step down as executive officers, and be replaced by H.Adolph Burgerhout of Aviolanda aircraft factory. On 2 January 1932 H.A. Burgerhout died.

=== Activities ceased ===
In January 1932 the new executive decided on an immediate cessation of the activities of the company. On 26 May 1932 the owners of the 7% bonds agreed to a cessation of the payment of interest and payback. The idea was that payment of interest would lead to a forced sale of the shipyard for a very low price. By stopping further losses, the assets (the modern shipyard) would turn in a profit once the economy improved.

=== Liquidation ===
Up until 1936 there was no serious interest to buy a shipyard. When the situation slightly recovered the parallel slipway was sold for 100,000 guilders in 1936. This sale was probably only completed in January 1937. The neighbouring shipyard P. Smit Jr. then bought the parallel slipway, the offices, the power station and the machine factory after lengthy negotiations.

Shipyard P. Smit Jr. moved part of her business to the machinefactory hall of Burgerhout. The hall was renovated, and part of the old machinery was sold. Smit would use the machine factory hall to build Burmeister & Wain engines.

=== HuMaBu ===
Only a few days after the sale of to P. Smit Jr. the rest of the terrain was sold to the new company HuMaBu on 14 January 1937. It meant that the core of a shipyard capable of building new ships was left intact. Therefore, a restart of the shipyard was possible and even expected. However, on 15 April HuMaBu sold the slipways and overhead cranes to P. Smit Jr. Smit bought the slipways, finding it highly undesirable to have another shipyard established next to hers.

HuMaBu then had only the boiler factory, an office and a large stretch of land left. HuMaBu itself was liquidated in 1939.
