= HMS Exeter (68) =

York-class cruiser of the Royal Navy

Coordinates: 5°00′S 111°00′E

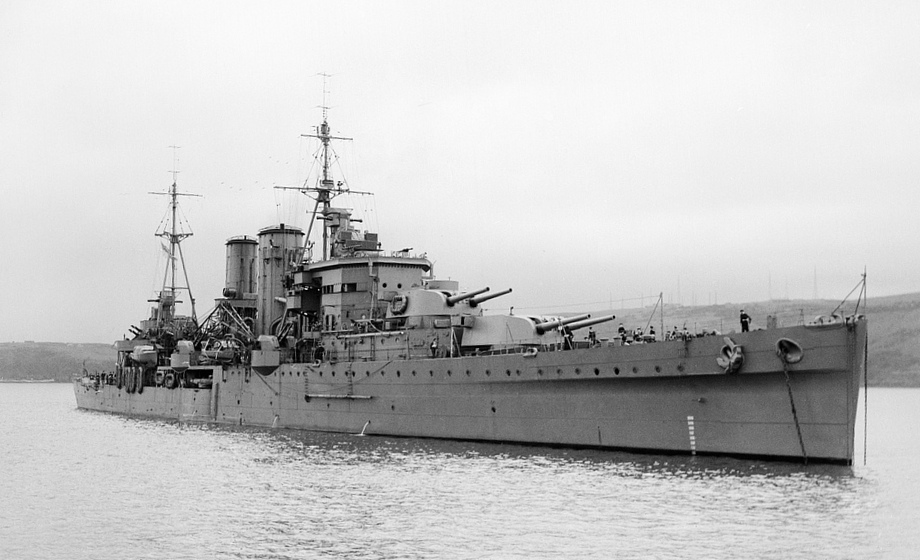
- Exeter after 1941 refit

History

United Kingdom
- Name: Exeter
- Namesake: Exeter
- Ordered: 15 March 1928
- Builder: Devonport Dockyard, Plymouth
- Laid down: 1 August 1928
- Launched: 18 July 1929
- Commissioned: 27 July 1931
- Identification: Pennant number: 68
- Fate: Sunk during the Second Battle of the Java Sea, 1 March 1942, wreck destroyed by illegal salvagers 2014–2016

General characteristics (as built)
- Class & type: York-class heavy cruiser
- Displacement: 8,390 long tons (8,520 t) (standard)
- Length: 575 ft 1 in (175.3 m) (o/a)
- Beam: 58 ft (17.7 m)
- Draught: 20 ft 3 in (6.2 m) (deep load)
- Installed power: 8 Admiralty 3-drum boilers; 80,000 shp (60,000 kW)
- Propulsion: 4 × shafts; 4 × geared steam turbine sets
- Speed: 32 knots (59 km/h; 37 mph)
- Range: 10,000 nmi (19,000 km; 12,000 mi) at 14 knots (26 km/h; 16 mph)
- Complement: 628
- Armament: 3 × twin 8 in (203 mm) guns; 4 × single 4 in (102 mm) AA guns; 2 × single 2 pdr (40 mm) AA guns; 2 × triple 21 in (533 mm) torpedo tubes
- Armour: Waterline belt: 3 in (76 mm); Deck: 1.5 in (38 mm); Barbettes: 1 in (25 mm); Gun turrets: 1 in (25 mm); Magazines: 3–5.5 in (76–140 mm); Bulkheads: 4.375 in (111 mm)
- Aircraft carried: 2 × seaplanes
- Aviation facilities: 2 × aircraft catapults

HMS Exeter was the second and last York-class heavy cruiser built for the Royal Navy during the late 1920s, and the last heavy cruiser the Royal Navy would ever build. Aside from a temporary deployment with the Mediterranean Fleet during the Abyssinia Crisis of 1935–1936, she spent the bulk of the 1930s assigned to the Atlantic Fleet or the North America and West Indies Station. When World War II began in September 1939, the cruiser was assigned to patrol South American waters against German commerce raiders. Exeter was one of three British cruisers that fought the German heavy cruiser Admiral Graf Spee later that year in the Battle of the River Plate. She was severely damaged during the battle, and she was under repair for over a year.

After repairs were completed the ship spent most of 1941 on convoy escort duties before she was transferred to the Far East after the start of the Pacific War in December. Exeter was generally assigned to escorting convoys to and from Singapore during the Malayan Campaign, and she continued on those duties in early February 1942 as the Japanese prepared to invade the Dutch East Indies. Later that month, she was assigned to the Striking Force of the joint American-British-Dutch-Australian Command (ABDACOM), and she took on a more active role in the defence of the Dutch East Indies. The culmination of this was her engagement in the Battle of the Java Sea later in the month as the Allies attempted to intercept several Imperial Japanese Navy invasion convoys. Exeter was crippled early in the battle, and she did not play much of a role as she withdrew. Two days later, she attempted to escape approaching Japanese forces, but she was intercepted and sunk by Japanese ships at the beginning of March in the Second Battle of the Java Sea.

Most of her crewmen survived the sinking and were rescued by the Japanese. About a quarter of them died during Japanese captivity. Her wreck was discovered in early 2007, and it was declared a war grave, but by 2016 her remains, along with other WWII wrecks, had been destroyed by illegal salvagers.

== Design and description ==
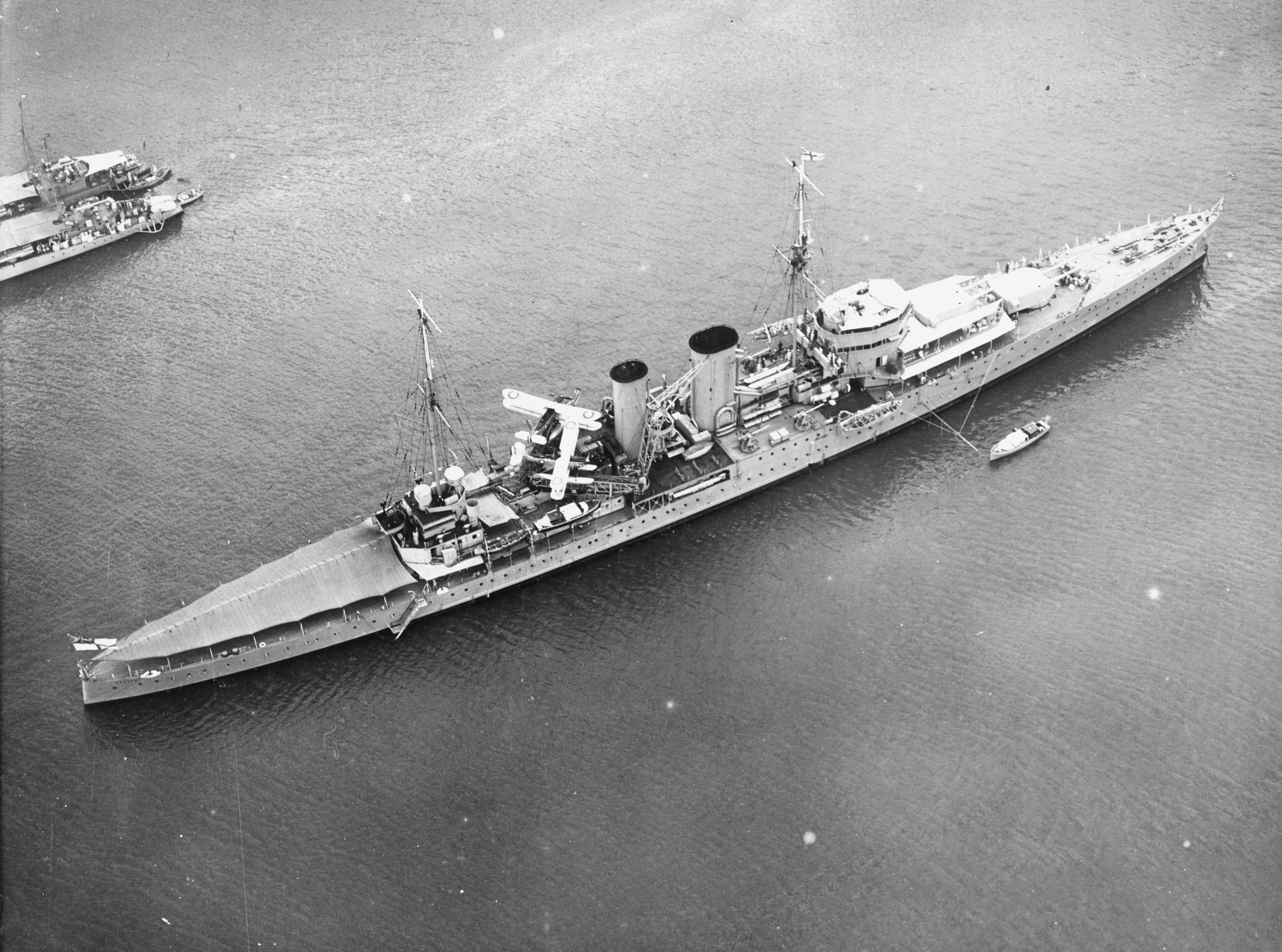
Aerial view of Exeter at anchor with awnings rigged, Balboa, Panama, 24 April 1934

Exeter was ordered two years after her sister ship York and her design incorporated improvements in light of experience with the latter. Her beam was increased by one foot (30 cm) to compensate for increases in topweight, and her boiler uptakes were trunked backwards from the boiler rooms, allowing for straight funnels further removed from the bridge rather than the raked funnels on York to ensure adequate dispersal of the flue gases. As the eight-inch (203 mm) gun turrets had proved not strong enough to accommodate the aircraft catapult originally intended, Exeter was given a pair of fixed catapults angled out from amidships in a "V" shape, with the associated crane placed to starboard. Consequently, the bridge was lowered (that of York being tall to give a view over the intended aircraft), and was of a streamlined, enclosed design that was incorporated into later cruisers.

Exeter was slightly lighter than expected and displaced 8,390 long tons (8,520 t) at standard load and 10,620 long tons (10,790 t) at deep load. The ship had an overall length of 575 feet 1 inch (175.3 m), a beam of 58 feet (17.7 m) and a draught of 20 feet 3 inches (6.2 m) at deep load. She was powered by four Parsons geared steam turbine sets, each driving one shaft, using steam provided by eight Admiralty 3-drum boilers. The turbines developed a total of 80,000 shaft horsepower (60,000 kW) and gave a maximum speed of 32 knots (59 km/h; 37 mph). The ship could carry 1,900 long tons (1,930 t) of fuel oil which gave her a range of 10,000 nautical miles (18,520 km; 11,510 mi) at 14 knots (26 km/h; 16 mph). The ship's complement was 628 officers and ratings.

The main armament of the York-class ships consisted of six BL eight-inch (203 mm) Mk VIII guns in three twin-gun turrets, designated "A", "B", and "Y" from fore to aft. "A" and "B" were superfiring forward of the superstructure and "Y" was aft of it. Defence against aircraft was provided by four QF four-inch (102 mm) Mk V anti-aircraft (AA) guns in single mounts amidships and a pair of two-pounder (40 mm (1.6 in)) light AA guns ("pom-poms") in single mounts. The ships also fitted with two triple torpedo tube above-water mounts for 21-inch (533 mm) torpedoes.

The cruisers lacked a full-length waterline armour belt. The sides of Exeter's boiler and engine rooms and the sides of the magazines were protected by 3 inches (76 mm) of armour. The transverse bulkheads at the end of her propulsion machinery rooms were 3.5 inches (89 mm) thick. The top of the magazines were protected by 5.5 inches (140 mm) of armour and their ends were 4.375 inches (111 mm) thick. The lower deck over the machinery spaces and steering gear had a thickness of 1.5 inches (38 mm).

=== Modifications ===
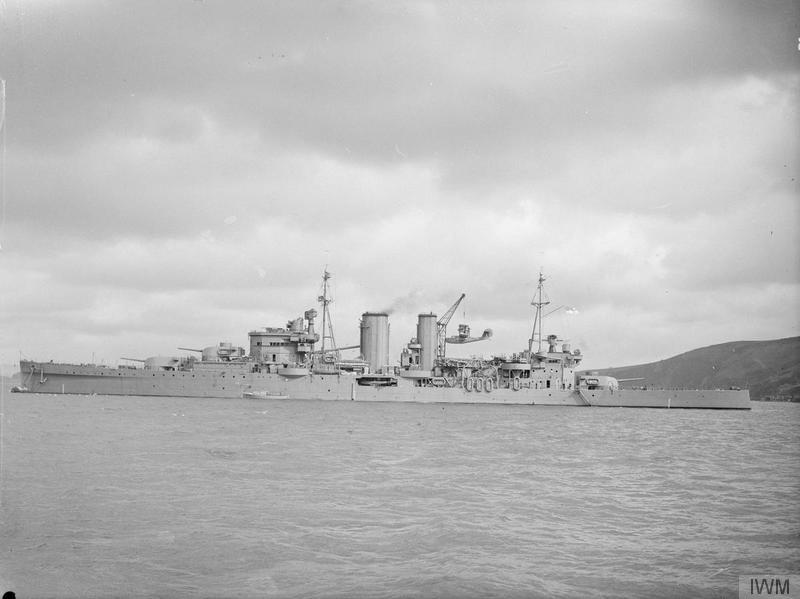
Exeter at anchor, early 1941

In 1932 Exeter had her side plating extended to enclose her open main deck as far back as the fore funnel. During that same refit, her pair of fixed catapults were finally installed for her Fairey IIIF floatplanes. In 1934–1935, two quadruple mounts for Vickers 0.5 in (12.7 mm) antiaircraft machineguns replaced the pair of two-pounder "pom-poms" originally installed.

While under repair in 1940–1941 after her battle with the Admiral Graf Spee, the Royal Navy decided to upgrade her armament and fire-control systems. The bridge was rebuilt and enlarged to accommodate a second High-Angle Control System aft of the Director-Control Tower (DCT) on top of the bridge, her single four-inch AA guns were replaced with twin-gun mounts for Mark XVI guns of the same calibre and a pair of octuple mounts for two-pounder "pom-poms" were added abreast her aft superstructure. Enclosures ("tubs") for single 20-millimetre (0.8 in) Oerlikon guns were added to the roof of both 'B' and 'Y' turrets, but these weapons were never installed, because of shortages in production, and lighter tripod-mounted machine guns were substituted. The pole masts were replaced by stronger tripod masts because the Type 279 early-warning radar had separate transmitting and receiving aerials, one at each masthead. In addition, a Type 284 fire-control radar was fitted to the DCT.

== Construction and career ==
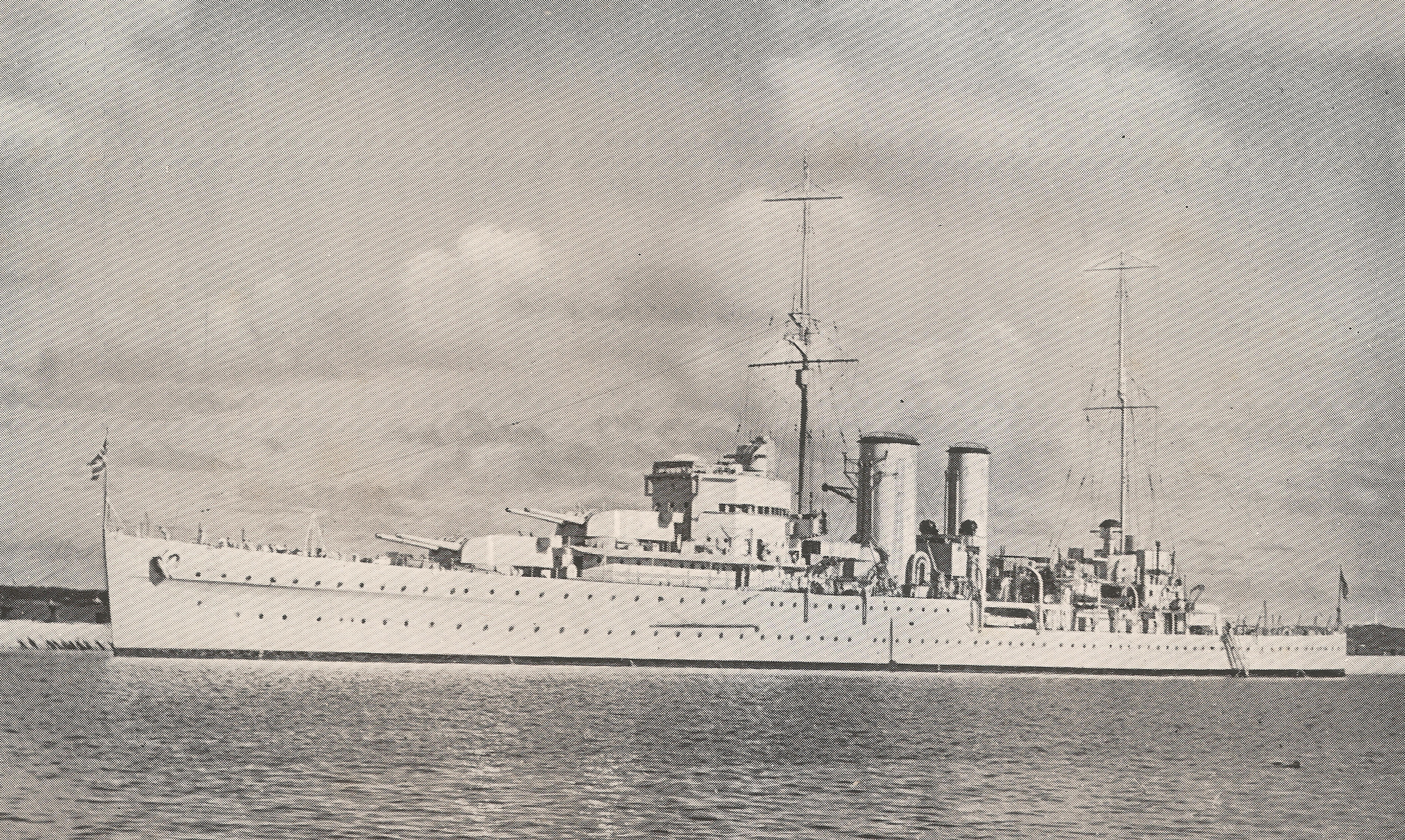
Exeter at the Royal Naval Dockyard Bermuda, circa 1936

=== 1928–1939 ===
Exeter, the fourth ship of her name to serve in the Royal Navy, was laid down on 1 August 1928, launched on 18 July 1929 and completed on 27 July 1931. The ship was then assigned to the 2nd Cruiser Squadron of the Atlantic Fleet, where she served between 1931 and 1933. In 1934 she was assigned, along with sister ship HMS York, to the 8th Cruiser Squadron based at the Royal Naval Dockyard in the Imperial fortress colony of Bermuda, on the America and West Indies Station. She remained there, aside from a temporary deployment to the Mediterranean during the Abyssinian crisis of 1935–1936, until 1939.

After re-commissioning in England on 29 December 1936, Exeter departed two days later, returning to Bermuda via St. Vincent, in the Cape Verde Islands, Montevideo and Punta del Este in Uruguay (meeting and exercising with her sister and the light cruiser HMS Ajax), Rio de Janeiro and Ceará in Brazil, Barbados (where the three cruisers joined the remainder of the squadron), and Tortola in the British Virgin Islands. It was initially intended for the entire squadron to be at Bermuda to take part in the ceremony there for the 12 May 1937 Coronation of George VI and Elizabeth, but it was then decided to disperse the ships among the various colonies of the station, and Exeter left Bermuda on 6 May for Nassau, in the Bahamas, departed for Bermuda after taking part in the Bahamian parade. The ship had her bottom repainted at the dockyard in Bermuda at the end of May and her Royal Marine detachment conducted combined exercises with the Bermuda Garrison to practice raiding a hostile shore in June. The cruiser was scheduled to depart Bermuda on 21 June for a nine-month cruise, but the Governor of Trinidad signalled on 20 June for a cruiser to be sent to that colony due to riots that had broken out among strikers in the oil fields of Apex and Fyzabad, which had included the killings of two police officers. Workers in other industries had also staged sympathy strikes. Ajax, which was in Nassau at the time, was ordered to Trinidad and Exeter followed the next day. On 2 July the marines of Exeter joined with those of Ajax and two-hundred police constables to assault the village of Fyzabad. The ship's marines were withdrawn on 5 July after the situation in Trinidad had stabilised, and the heavy cruiser departed immediately for Balboa, Panama to continue its summer (Southern Hemisphere winter) cruise, which took her through the Panama Canal, up the Pacific coast of North America to HMCS Naden (the old Royal Naval Dockyard, Esquimalt), via San Diego, California. Exeter's return trip took her to both coasts of South America before arriving at Bermuda on 28 March 1938 together with the light cruiser HMS Orion. The German sail training ship Horst Wessel visited Bermuda from 21 to 25 May and the crew of Exeter hosted the German cadets during their stay.

=== Second World War ===
==== Battle of the River Plate ====
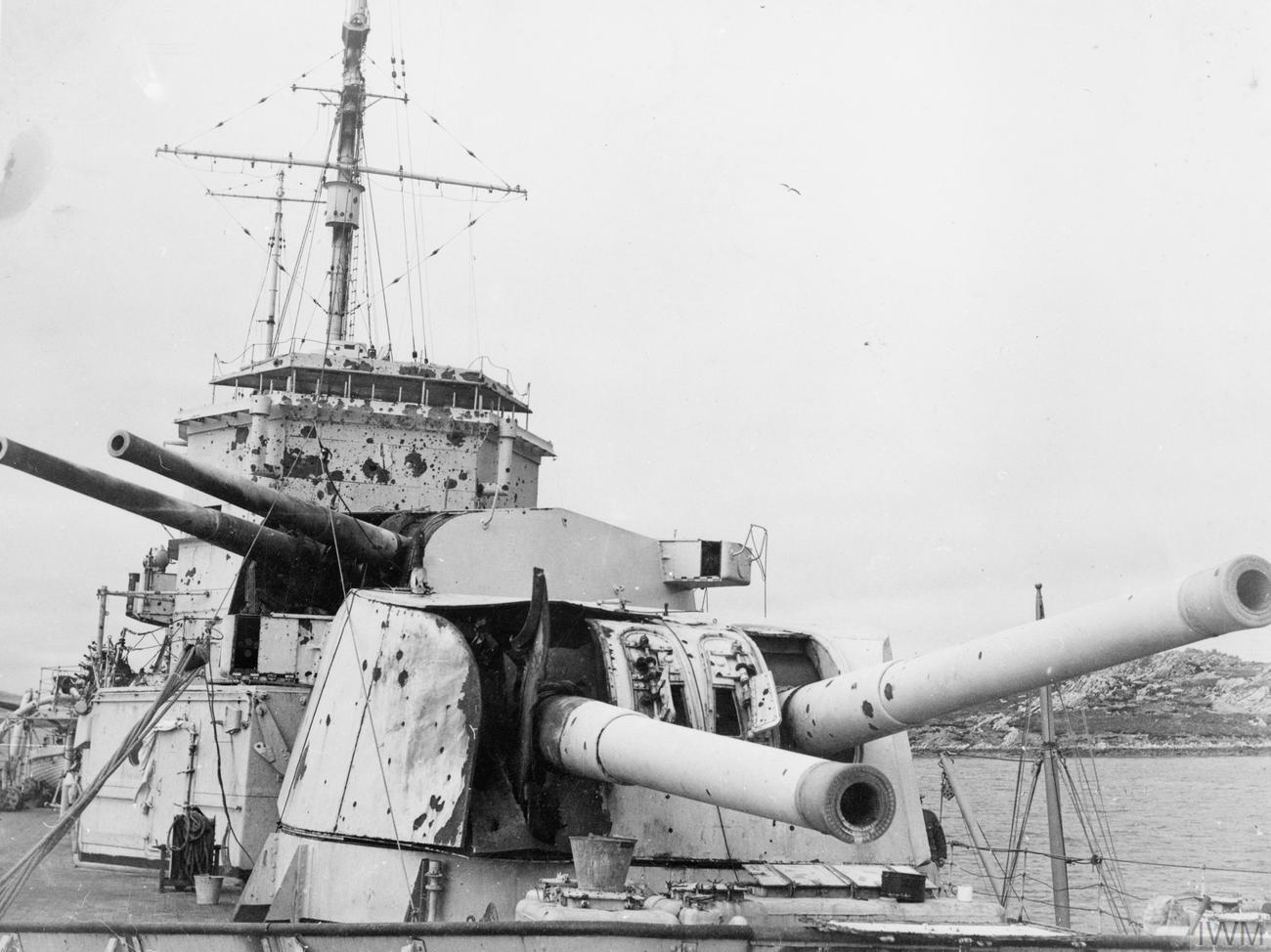
Damage received by Exeter during the Battle of the River Plate

At the outbreak of World War II, she remained part of the South American Division with the Ajax. The division was transferred to the South Atlantic Station, with the addition of the heavy cruiser Cumberland, under Commodore Henry Harwood. The ship, commanded by Captain Frederick Bell, was assigned to Force G to hunt for German commerce raiders off the eastern coast of South America on 6 October 1939. Two months later, Harwood ordered Exeter and the light cruiser Achilles to rendezvous with his own Ajax off the mouth of the Río de la Plata, while the heavy cruiser Cumberland was refitting in the Falkland Islands. The two other ships arrived on 12 December, and then the Admiral Graf Spee spotted the Exeter during the following morning.

Captain Hans Langsdorff decided to engage the British and closed at full speed. The British doctrine on how to engage ships like the Admiral Graf Spee had been developed by Harwood in 1936 and specified that the British force act as two divisions. Following this procedure, Exeter operated as a division on her own while Achilles and Ajax formed the other, splitting the fire of the German ship. They were only partially successful as the German ship concentrated her main armament of six 283-millimetre (11.1 in) guns on Exeter, and her secondary armament of eight 150-millimetre (5.9 in) guns on the light cruisers. Langsdorff opened fire on Exeter at 06:18 with high-explosive shells and she returned fire two minutes later at a range of 18,700 yards (17,100 m). The German ship straddled the British cruiser with her third salvo; shrapnel from the near misses killed the crew of the starboard torpedo tubes, started fires amidships and damaged both Supermarine Walrus seaplanes. After eight salvos from Exeter, Admiral Graf Spee scored a direct hit on 'B' turret that knocked it out of action and shrapnel from the hit killed all of the bridge personnel except three. Bell, wounded in the face, transferred to the aft conning position to continue the battle. His ship was hit twice more shortly afterwards, but her powerplant was not damaged and she remained seaworthy, although her aircraft had to be jettisoned.

At 06:30, Langsdorff switched his fire to the light cruisers, but only inflicted shrapnel damage on them before some of Exeter's torpedoes forced him to turn away at 06:37 to evade them. Her second torpedo attack at 06:43 was also unsuccessful. In the meanwhile, Langsdorff had switched his main guns back to the heavy cruiser and scored several more hits. They knocked out 'A' turret, started a fire amidships that damaged the ship's fire-control and navigation circuits, and caused a seven-degree list with flooding. After "Y" turret had temporarily been disabled, Bell said, "I'm going to ram the --------. It will be the end of us but it will sink him too". The turret was repaired and she remained in action until flooding disabled the machinery for "Y" turret at 07:30. At 11:07, Bell informed Harwood that Exeter had a single eight-inch and a four-inch gun available in local control, and that she could make 18 knots (33 km/h; 21 mph). Harwood ordered Bell to head to the Falklands for repair.

The ship was hit by a total of seven 283 mm shells that killed 61 of her crew and wounded another 23. In return, the cruiser had hit Admiral Graf Spee three times; one shell penetrated her main armour belt and narrowly missed detonating in one of her engine rooms, but the most important of these disabled her oil-purification equipment. Without it, the ship was unlikely to be able to reach Germany. Several days later, unable to be repaired and apparently confronted by powerful Royal Navy reinforcements (including HMS Cumberland), the Admiral Graf Spee was scuttled by her captain in the harbour of Montevideo.

Although very heavily damaged, Exeter was still able to make good speed—18 knots—though four feet down by the bows, with a list of about eight degrees to starboard, and decks covered in fuel oil and water, making movement within the ship very difficult. She made for Port Stanley for emergency repairs which took until January 1940. There were rumours that she would remain in Stanley, becoming a rusting hulk, until the end of the war, but First Lord of the Admiralty Winston Churchill wrote to the First Sea Lord and others "We ought not readily to accept the non-repair during the war of Exeter. She should be strengthened and strutted internally as far as possible . . . and come home". She was repaired and modernised at HM Dockyard, Devonport between 14 February 1940 and 10 March 1941;

Captain W.N.T. Beckett was appointed to relieve Bell on 12 December 1940. Then, on 10 March 1941, the day that Exeter was due to be recommissioned, Beckett died at Saltash Hospital from complications following exploratory surgery to repair poison gas injuries that he had received earlier in his career. His replacement was Captain Oliver Gordon.

==== To the Far East ====
Upon returning to the fleet, Exeter primarily spent time on 'working up' exercises, however she also conducted several patrols in northern waters, one on which she stopped in Iceland to refuel. On 22 May she departed from Britain (for the last time as it would turn out), escorting Convoy WS-8B to Aden (Yemen) via Freetown and Durban, South Africa (the beginning of which occurred at the very same time as the hunt for the German battleship Bismarck. was taking place). Exeter henceforth became attached to the East Indies Squadron (later redesignated as the Far East Fleet).

Exeter then stayed on escort duty in the Indian Ocean (primarily off the coast of Africa) and the northern Arabian Sea (where she visited Bombay, India) until 13 October. On that day Exeter departed Aden for Colombo, British Ceylon) via Bombay, British India arriving on 24 October. Exeter then spent several days in a graving dock and after undocking (on the 29th) conducted exercises off Colombo and visited the Maldives.

Upon return to Trincomalee (Ceylon) from the Maldives on 14 November, Exeter then departed for Calcutta on the 16th to cover a small two-ship convoy that left Calcutta for Rangoon (Burma) on the 26th and 27th. After the successful completion of that duty she was then tasked to escort another ship from Calcutta to Rangoon on 6 December. However, during that convoy, on 8 December, Exeter was ordered to urgently proceed to Singapore to reinforce Force Z, as the Pacific War had just begun. Exeter arrived at Singapore during the afternoon of 10 December, too late to support Repulse and Prince of Wales as they had both been sunk earlier that day, but some of the survivors from these two ships were treated in Exeter's sick bay.

Exeter thus returned to Colombo the next day (11 December) and spent the next two months – until almost mid-February 1942 – escorting convoys (primarily from Bombay and Colombo) bound for Singapore – which fell to the Japanese on 15 February. During this time, in early 1942, Exeter was attached to the newly formed American-British-Dutch-Australian Command (ABDACOM), which came into being in early January in Singapore, but soon shifted its headquarters to Java in the Dutch East Indies (present day Indonesia).

==== The Gaspar Strait sortie ====
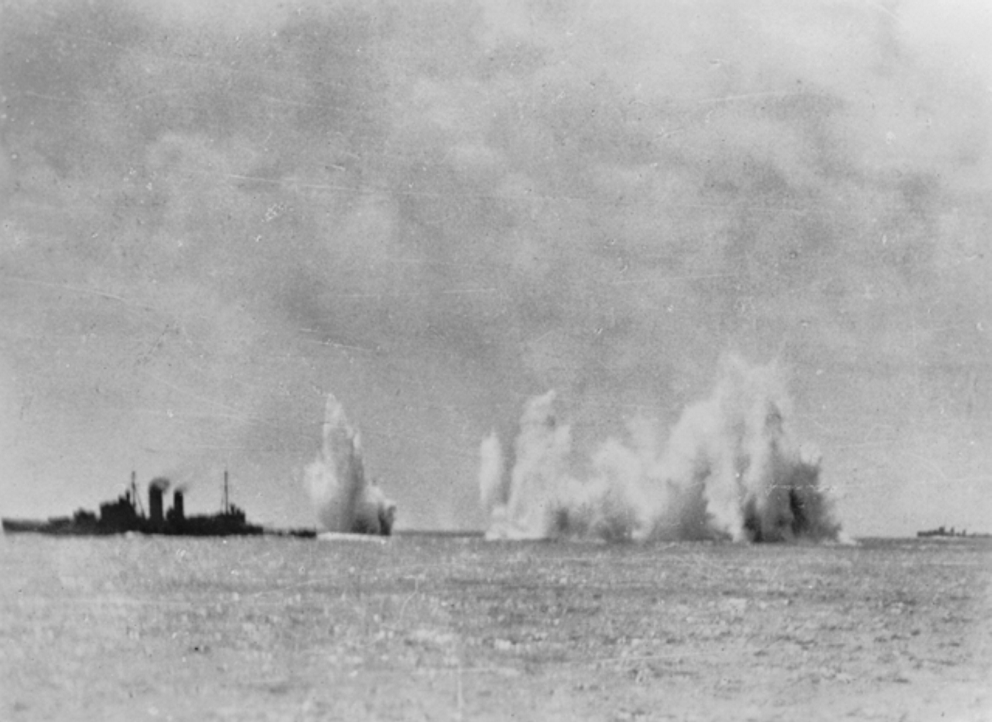
Exeter under air attack on 15 February 1942

On 13 February Allied reconnaissance aircraft spotted Japanese invasion convoys north of Bangka Island and the new commander of ABDA naval forces, Vice Admiral Conrad Helfrich of the Royal Netherlands Navy, was ordered to assemble the Allied Striking Force of Exeter and three Dutch and one Australian light cruisers at Oosthaven on the morning of 14 February. Escorted by six American and three Dutch destroyers, the force departed that afternoon. The Dutch Rear Admiral Karel Doorman, commanding the force, took his ships through the Gaspar Strait and then northwest towards Bangka Island. While passing through the strait, the Dutch destroyer Van Ghent struck a rock in poor visibility and another Dutch destroyer was tasked to take off her crew. The Japanese spotted the Allied ships around 08:00 and repeatedly attacked them. The first was a group of seven Nakajima B5N "Kate" torpedo bombers from the light carrier Ryūjō that attacked Exeter with bombs around 10:30. The blast from a near miss badly damaged her Walrus, but the ship was only damaged by shrapnel. They were followed shortly afterwards by a group of 23 Mitsubishi G3M "Nell" bombers from the Genzan Air Group that inflicted no damage as they dropped their bombs from high altitude. Another group of six B5Ns attacked without effect at 11:30.

The repeated aerial attacks persuaded Doorman that further progress was unwise in the face of Japanese aerial supremacy and he ordered his ships to reverse course and head for Tanjung Priok at 12:42. The attacks continued as 27 G3Ms of the Mihoro Air Group then bombed from high altitude. Seven more B5Ns attacked fruitlessly at 14:30; a half-dozen more followed an hour later. The final attack was made by 17 Mitsubishi G4M "Betty" bombers of the Kanoya Air Group shortly before dark. The Japanese attacks were almost entirely ineffectual, with no ship reporting anything more than shrapnel damage. In return, allied anti-aircraft fire was moderately effective with most of the attacking bombers damaged by shrapnel. In addition, one G4M crashed while attempting to land, and another was badly damaged upon landing.

==== First Battle of the Java Sea ====
On 25 February, Helfrich ordered all available warships to join Doorman's Eastern Striking Force at Surabaya. The Exeter and the Australian light cruiser Perth, escorted by three British destroyers, Jupiter, Encounter, and Electra, set sail at once, leaving behind one Australian cruiser and two destroyers that were short of fuel. After they had arrived the following day, Doorman's entire force of five cruisers and nine destroyers departed Surabaya at 18:30 to patrol off Eastern Java in hopes of intercepting the oncoming invasion convoy which had been spotted earlier that morning. The Japanese were further north than he anticipated and his ships found nothing. His own ships were located at 09:35 on the following morning, 27 February, and were continuously tracked by the Japanese. Doorman ordered a return to Surabaya at 10:30, and his ships were attacked by eight bombers from the Kanoya Air Group at 14:37. They claimed to have made two hits on the Jupiter, but actually they missed the British destroyer. Just as his leading ships were entering harbour, he received reports of enemy ships 90 miles (140 km) to the north and Doorman ordered his ships to turn about to intercept them.

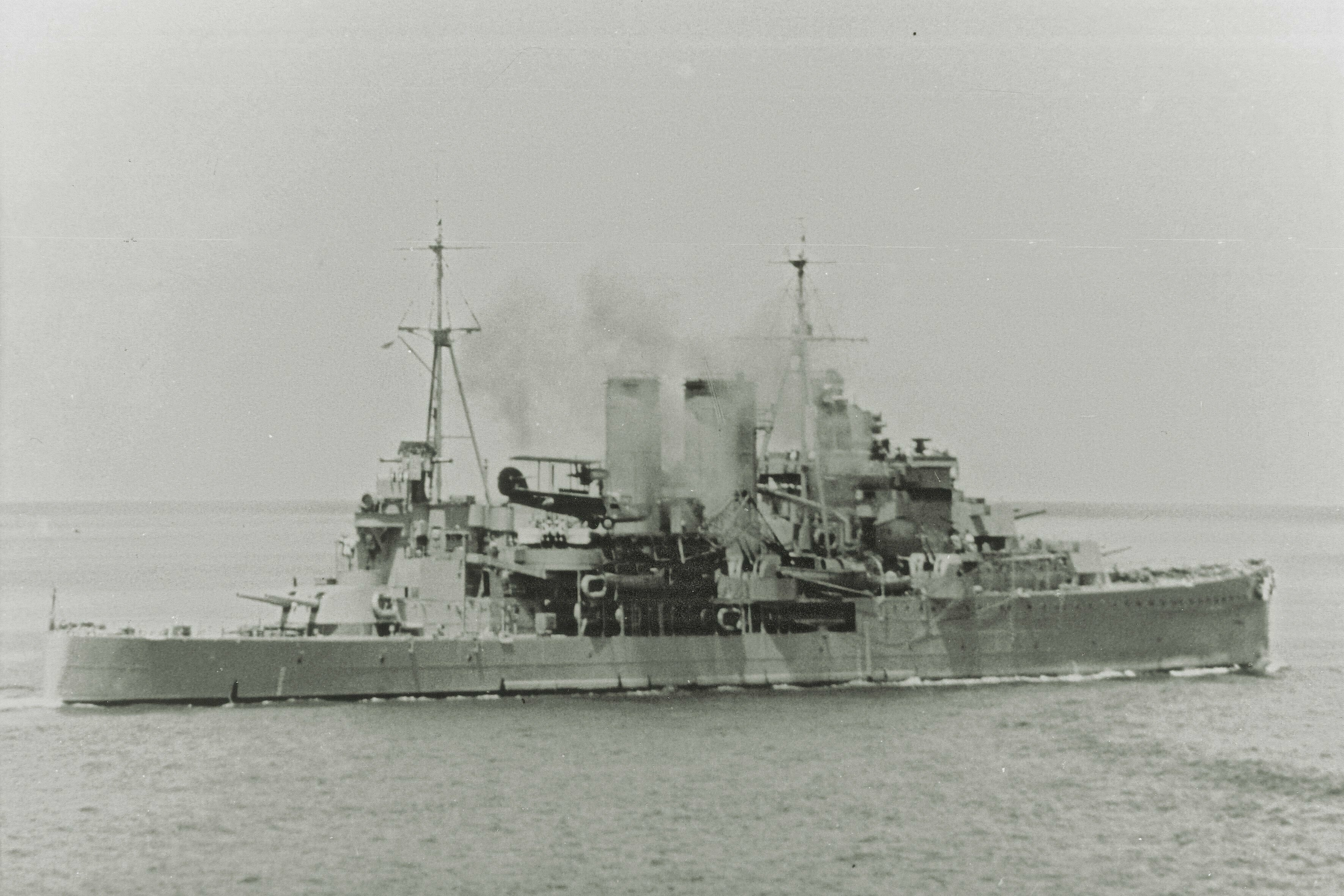
Exeter, Java Sea, February, 1942

Aware of Doorman's movements, the Japanese commander, Rear Admiral Takeo Takagi, detached the convoy's two escorting destroyer flotillas, each consisting of a light cruiser and seven destroyers, to intercept the Allied ships in conjunction with his own pair of heavy cruisers (Nachi and Haguro) which were escorted by a pair of destroyers. His heavy cruisers opened fire at long range at 15:47 with little effect. The light cruisers and destroyers closed to ranges between 13,000 and 15,000 yards (12,000 and 14,000 m) and began firing Type 93 "Long Lance" torpedoes beginning at 16:03. All of these torpedoes failed to damage their targets, although one torpedo hit Exeter and failed to detonate at 16:35. Three minutes later, Haguro changed the course of the battle when one of her shells penetrated the British ship's starboard aft twin four-inch gun mount before detonating in the 'B' or aft boiler room, knocking six of her boilers off-line and killing 14 of her crew. The ship sheered out of line to avoid another torpedo and slowed, followed by all of the trailing cruisers. Moments later a torpedo fired from Haguro stuck the Dutch destroyer Kortenaer, breaking her in half and sinking her almost immediately. Perth laid a smoke screen to protect Exeter and the Allied ships sorted themselves into separate groups as they attempted to disengage. Exeter was escorted by one Dutch and all three British destroyers in one group and the other cruisers and the American destroyers formed the other group. The Japanese did not initially press their pursuit as they manoeuvered to use their torpedoes against the crippled Exeter, which could only make 5 knots (9.3 km/h; 5.8 mph), and her escorts.

The Japanese began launching torpedoes beginning at 17:20 at ranges of 10,000 to 18,500 yards (9,100 to 16,900 m), but they all missed. For some reason, two Japanese destroyers, Asagumo and Minegumo, continued to close before firing their torpedoes at 6,500 yards (5,900 m) and Encounter and Electra pulled out of line to counter-attack. Engaging at close range as they closed, Electra damaged Asagumo, but was sunk by the Japanese ship at 17:46. Meanwhile, Exeter continued south to Surabaya, escorted by the Dutch destroyer Witte de With. Doorman's repeated unsuccessful, and ultimately fatal, attempts to reach the transports concentrated the Japanese on the task of protecting the transports and allowed the damaged British cruiser to reach harbour.

==== Second Battle of the Java Sea ====
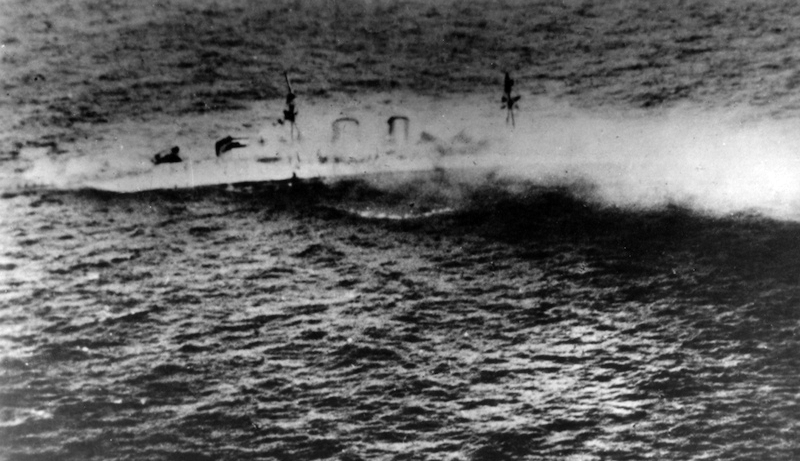
Exeter sinking after the Second Battle of the Java Sea

The following day, after making temporary repairs and refuelling, Exeter, escorted by Encounter and the American destroyer Pope, was ordered to steam to Colombo, via the Sunda Strait. They departed on the evening of 28 February, but they were intercepted by the Japanese heavy cruisers Nachi, Haguro, Myōkō, and Ashigara, and by the destroyers Akebono, Inazuma, Yamakaze, and Kawakaze on the morning of 1 March.

At about 0800, the British ships spotted two of the Japanese cruisers, one of which launched its spotting floatplanes. Two others were seen closing in, and both launched their aircraft before opening fire at about 09:30. The Allied ships laid smoke and turned away to the east with the Japanese to their north and south. Exeter was able to reach a speed of 26 knots (48 km/h; 30 mph) before the first hit on her detonated in her 'A', or forward, boiler room and catastrophically knocked out all power around 11:20. Now defenseless as no guns could train or traverse, and wanting to save as many lives as he could, and to avoid the ship's capture by the Japanese forces, Captain Gordon ordered the ship to be scuttled. As a result, Exeter began listing to port, and that list was said to be at "a considerable angle" by the time the abandonment was completed. Sensing a kill, the Japanese destroyers closed in and fired torpedoes, two of which (out of a total of 18 fired by Japanese combatants) from the Inazuma, hit the ship – starboard amidships, and starboard just forward of A turret, as confirmed when the wreck was first discovered in 2007. As a result, Exeter rapidly righted herself, paused briefly, and then capsized to starboard. Encounter and Pope were also lost; Encounter approximately fifteen minutes after Exeter, while Pope temporarily survived the initial melee, only to be sunk a couple of hours later. Japanese B5N Type-97s armed with one 250 kg (551 lb) and four 60 kg (132 lb) bombs assisted in the sinking of Pope, already crippled by bombing from seaplanes and land-based air, and closed in to make a level bombing attack. No direct hits were scored, but several more near-misses hastened the abandonment and scuttling of the vessel, and she was finished off by gunfire with the late arrival of the two IJN cruisers Ashigara and Myoko.

The Japanese rescued 652 men of the crew of Exeter, including her captain, who became prisoners of war.

== Wreck site ==
The wreck was discovered and positively identified by a group of exploration divers specifically searching for Exeter aboard MV Empress on 21 February 2007. The wreck was found lying on its starboard side in Indonesian waters at a depth of about 200 feet (61 m), 90 miles (140 km) north-west of Bawean Island – some 60 miles (97 km) from the estimated sinking position given by Captain Gordon after the war. In July 2008, HMS Kent performed a memorial service over the wreck of Exeter. Aboard, along with several British dignitaries and high ranking naval officers, were a BBC film crew and four of HMS Exeter's veteran survivors, and one of the 2007 wreck discovery dive team representing the other three dive team members. Her wreck, a British war grave, had been destroyed by illegal salvagers by the time another expedition surveyed the site in 2016.
