= Second Battle of the Java Sea =

Naval battle during World War II

- Part of the Pacific theatre of World War II
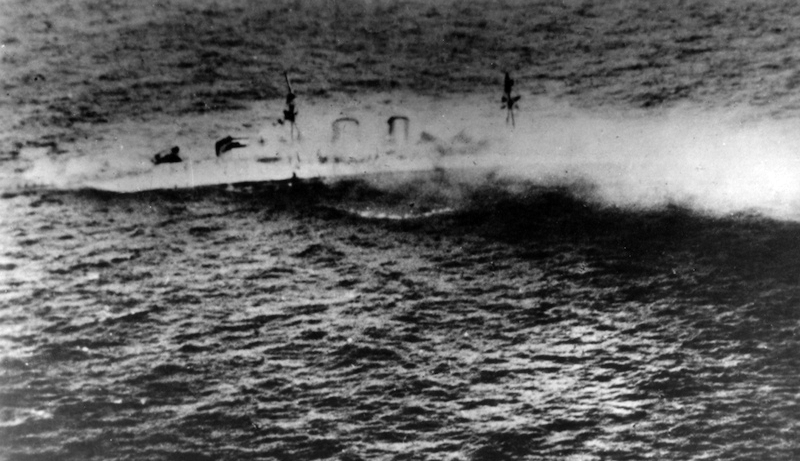
- HMS Exeter sinking
| Date | 1 March 1942 |
| Location | Java Sea, Dutch East Indies |
| Result | Japanese victory |

Belligerents
| Japan | United Kingdom; United States |

Commanders and leaders
| Takeo Takagi; Ibō Takahashi | Oliver Gordon |

Strength
| 4 heavy cruisers 5 destroyers 1 light aircraft carrier 2 seaplane tenders | 1 heavy cruiser 2 destroyers |

Casualties and losses
| 1 destroyer damaged | 800 captured 1 heavy cruiser sunk 2 destroyers sunk |

The Second Battle of the Java Sea was the last naval action of the Netherlands East Indies campaign, of 1941–42. It occurred on 1 March 1942, two days after the first Battle of the Java Sea. It saw the end of the last Allied warships operating in the waters around Java, allowing Japanese forces to complete their conquest of the Dutch East Indies unhindered.

== Background ==
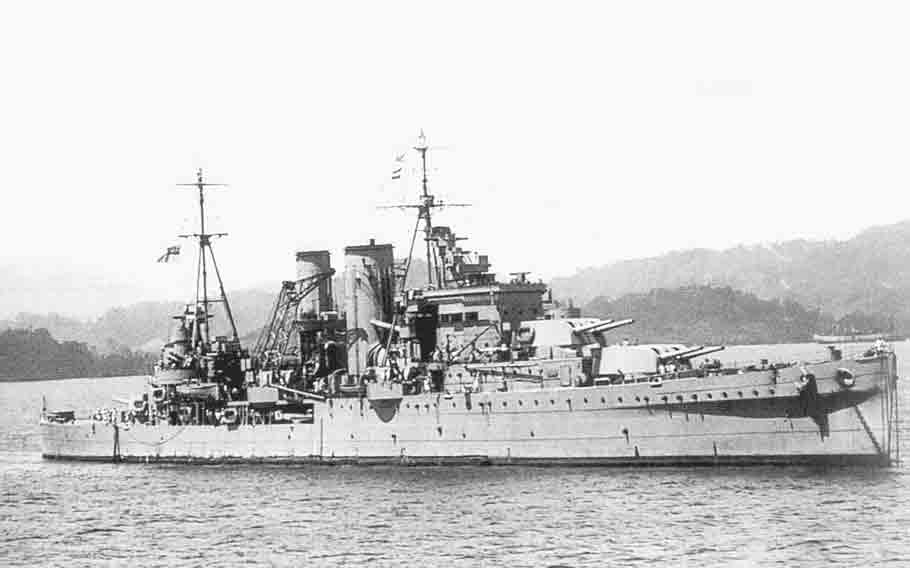
HMS Exeter in 1942.

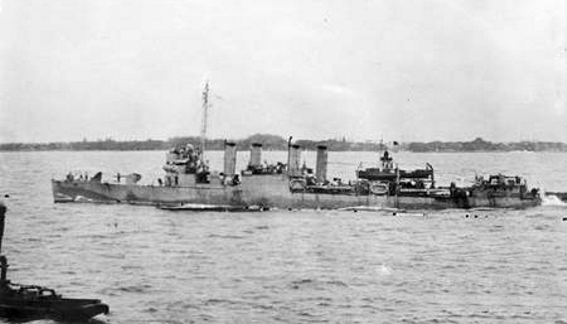
USS Pope in February 1942.

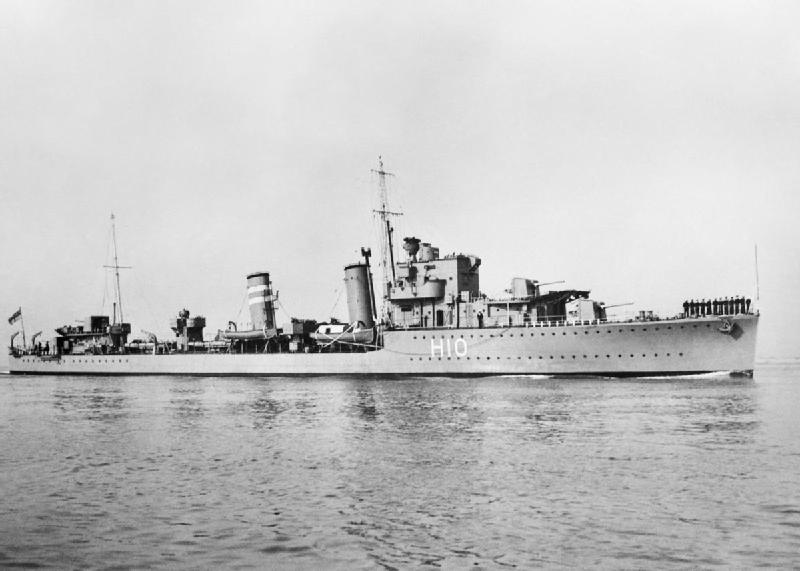
HMS Encounter in July 1938.

The American-British-Dutch-Australian Command fleet were defeated at the first Battle of the Java Sea, on 27 February 1942, and its ships had been dispersed or sunk by the Japanese.

The light cruiser HMAS Perth and the heavy cruiser USS Houston had retreated to Tanjung Priok, the port of the capital, Batavia, in the west of the island. They planned to withdraw via the Sunda Strait to Tjilatjap on the south of the island and departed on the evening of 28 February; but encountering the Japanese Western Invasion Force later that night in Bantam Bay, they were both sunk in the battle of Sunda Strait; in a related but separate action, the Dutch destroyer HNLMS Evertsen was also destroyed.

The heavy cruiser HMS Exeter—severely damaged in the first Battle of the Java Sea—had withdrawn to Surabaya in the east, escorted by the Dutch destroyer HNLMS Witte de With. There she was joined by HMS Encounter, which arrived with the survivors from the destroyer HNLMS Kortenaer. Also at Surabaya were the four U.S. destroyers of Destroyer Division 58 (DesDiv 58), which had also withdrawn there from the battle, and USS Pope, which had been undergoing repairs.

On 28 February, after nightfall, DesDiv 58 (USS John D. Edwards, John D. Ford, Alden, and Paul Jones) departed for Australia via Surabaya's shallow eastern channel, and then exited the Java area by going south through the Bali Strait; after a brief encounter with Japanese destroyers they arrived safely at Fremantle on 4 March.

After emergency repairs, Exeter also left for further repairs in Ceylon, leaving at dusk on 28 February, and escorted by Encounter and Pope. Witte de With was unable to leave, due to mechanical trouble, and was later bombed and sunk at Surabaya on 2 March.

As Exeter had too much draft for leaving the main anchorage at Surabaya via its southern (thence eastern) channel, she was forced to leave via the main north entrance with a decision having been made to exit the Java Sea via Sunda Strait to the west, which was thought to be still open; the morning of 1 March found the three Allied ships west-northwest of Bawean island, heading westwards. The ships were making 23 kn (26 mph; 43 km/h), as much as Exeter could manage.

== The battle ==
At 04:00 on 1 March, ships were sighted to the west; being in no condition for a battle, Exeter and her two consorts changed course to the northwest to avoid contact.

More ships were sighted at 07:50, bearing southwest; again, the Allied ships had to alter course to avoid them.

At 09:35, two heavy cruisers were sighted approaching from the south; these were Nachi and Haguro of the Eastern Invasion Force with two destroyers, Yamakaze and Kawakaze under Admiral Takeo Takagi, whom they had met two days previously at the Battle of the Java Sea.

Exeter and the destroyers turned northeast and increased speed, but soon sighted more ships approaching from the northwest; this was Admiral Ibo Takahashi, with the heavy cruisers Ashigara and Myōkō and two destroyers, Inazuma and Akebono.

Closing in on either side of the fleeing Allied ships, the cruisers opened fire at 10:20 as they came in range.

Encounter and Pope responded by making smoke, and later attempted a torpedo attack, while Exeter returned fire, but at 11:20 Exeter sustained a major hit in her boiler room, resulting in a loss of power and slowing her to 4 kn (4.6 mph; 7.4 km/h). As the four Japanese cruisers closed in on Exeter, Encounter and Pope were ordered to break contact and make for a nearby rain squall in an attempt to shake off pursuit. Struck by multiple shell hits, Exeter was brought to a standstill, and the destroyer Inazuma closed in for a torpedo attack, hitting Exeter with two torpedoes on her starboard side. Exeter sank at 11:40, approximately 90 mi (78 nmi; 140 km) north-west of Bawean Island.

The Japanese cruisers had by then already switched their attention to the fleeing destroyers; Encounter however had gallantly disobeyed her orders to escape and had previously turned back to lay a smoke screen to protect the immobilised Exeter, and aid survivors, but had soon been immobilised herself by shell hits and set on fire. Lieutenant Commander Eric 'Rattler' Morgan, the destroyer's captain, ordered his ship scuttled to prevent her capture by the Japanese and she capsized and sank about 12:10. Pope continued to evade and was able to reach the rain squall and was lost to sight.

The respite was short-lived, however; shortly after noon she was spotted by planes from the aircraft carrier Ryūjō, which was covering the Western Invasion Force; she was dive-bombed and sunk around 13:50.

There were just over 800 survivors altogether; these were rescued and imprisoned by the Japanese, with 190 of them subsequently dying in captivity.

== The wrecks ==
The wrecks of HMS Exeter and HMS Encounter were discovered by explorers – who had been looking for the wrecks for five years – in February 2007 only several miles apart, 90 miles (140 km) north-west of Bawean Island, 60 miles (97 km) from Exeter's captain's (Oliver Gordon) estimated sinking position, at a depth of approximately 60 m (200 ft). The remains of the wreck of USS Pope was discovered in late 2008, but was found to have already been plundered.

In November 2016, a diving expedition discovered that the wrecks of HMS Exeter and HMS Encounter were missing from the ocean floor. The Guardian newspaper subsequently reported that the wrecks of HMS Exeter, HMS Encounter, and part of HMS Electra, as well as the submarine USS Perch were missing and presumed illegally scavenged. Commenting on their removal, one of the men involved in their original discovery was stunned at the magnitude of the salvaging that appeared to have taken place.

== Bibliography ==
- Stephen Roskill: The War at Sea 1939-1945 Vol II (1956) ISBN (none)
- Samuel Eliot Morison: History of United States Naval operations in World War II: Vol III The Rising Sun in the Pacific (1948) ISBN (none)
- Eric Groves: Sea Battles in Close-Up WWII Vol 2 (1993) ISBN 0-7110-2118-X
- Donald MacIntyre: The Battle for the Pacific (1966) ISBN (none)
