= American-British-Dutch-Australian Command =

World War II combined command (1942)

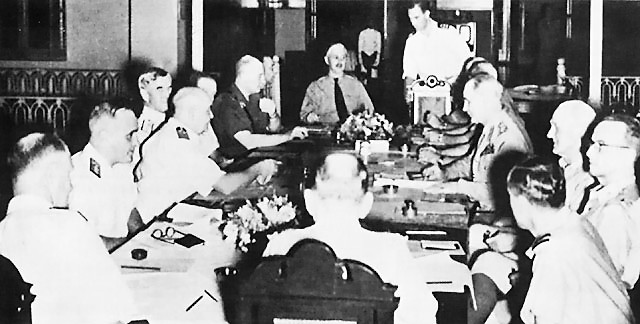
The first ABDACOM conference. Seated around the table, from left: Admirals Layton, Helfrich, and Hart, General ter Poorten, Colonel Kengen (at head of table), and Generals Wavell, Brett, and Brereton

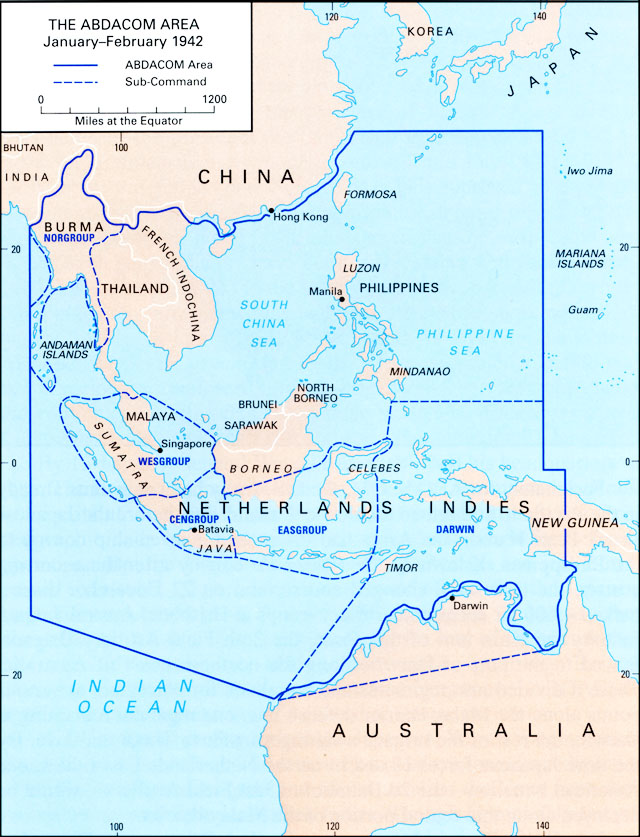
ABDACOM Area

The American-British-Dutch-Australian (ABDA) Command, or ABDACOM, was the short-lived supreme command for all Allied forces in South East Asia in early 1942, during the Pacific War in World War II. It consisted of the forces of Australia, the Netherlands, United Kingdom and the United States.

Led by General Sir Archibald Wavell, the command's objective was to maintain control of the "Malay Barrier" (or "East Indies Barrier"), a notional line running down the Malay Peninsula through Singapore and the southernmost islands of the Dutch East Indies. ABDACOM was also known within the British military as the "South West Pacific Command" (not to be confused with the later South West Pacific Area command established in March 1942).

Although ABDACOM collapsed only in eight weeks without achieving its aims, it provided some useful lessons for combined Allied commands later in the war and is still studied by contemporary military analysts.

== Formation ==
Efforts to organise the ABDA Command began soon after war between the Allies and Japan commenced, on 7 December 1941. Army Chief of Staff George C. Marshall and Secretary of War Henry L. Stimson were anxious to establish unity of command over the Allied forces in all theatres after observing Allied defeats in the Battle of France, the Mediterranean and Middle East theatre, and the attack on Pearl Harbor.

Despite objections from the British military establishment, the scheme was finalized at the Arcadia Conference in Washington. On December 27 Marshall and Admiral Ernest King proposed an ABDA Command led by Archibald Wavell to Charles Portal, Dudley Pound, and John Dill. The British were skeptical and believed the Pacific theatre was too geographically large to be controlled by a single commander. Winston Churchill warned Marshall about the difficulties faced by Ferdinand Foch as Supreme Allied Commander while simply trying to coordinate operations across the Western Front of World War I. Marshall rebuffed this and other historical analogies from Churchill, telling him that he "was not interested in Drake and Frobisher, but I was interested in having a united front against Japan." Churchill reluctantly telephoned his War Cabinet in London advising them to accept the arrangement despite their concerns. On December 29, Winston Churchill said that it had been agreed Wavell would be supreme commander in order to assuage British concerns. Wavell then held the position of British Commander-in-Chief, India. Churchill added:

It is intended that General Wavell should have a staff in the south Pacific accessible as Foch's High Control Staff was to the Great Staffs of the British and French armies in France [during World War I]. He would receive his orders from an appropriate joint body who will be responsible to me as the Minister of Defence and to the President of the United States who is also Commander-in-Chief of all United States forces.

Following the declaration by the four nations on 1 January 1942, the Allied governments formally appointed Wavell. The formation of ABDACOM meant that Wavell had control of a huge but thinly spread force covering an area from Burma in the west, to Dutch New Guinea and the Commonwealth of the Philippines in the east. Other areas, including the British Raj and the Territory of Hawaii, remained officially under separate commands, and in practice General Douglas MacArthur was in complete control of Allied forces in the Philippines. At Wavell's insistence, North West Australia (see map) was added to the ABDA area. The rest of Australia was under Australian control, as were its territories of Papua and New Guinea.

ABDA was charged with holding the Malay Barrier for as long as possible in order to retain Allied control of the Indian Ocean and the western sea approaches to Australia. This was a nearly hopeless task, given the Japanese supremacy in naval forces in the western Pacific. The task was further complicated by the addition of Burma to the command; the difficulties of coordinating action between forces of four nationalities that used different equipment and had not trained together; and the different priorities of the national governments. British leaders were primarily interested in retaining control of Singapore; the military capacity of the Dutch East Indies had suffered as a result of the defeat of the Netherlands by Nazi Germany in 1940, and the Dutch administration was focused on defending the island of Java; the Australian government was heavily committed to the war in North Africa and Europe, and had few readily accessible military resources; and the United States was preoccupied with the Philippines, which at the time was a U.S. Commonwealth territory.

Wavell arrived in Singapore, where the British Far East Command was based, on 7 January 1942. ABDACOM absorbed this British command in its entirety. On 18 January, Wavell moved his headquarters to Lembang near Bandoeng on Java. On 1 February the air force portion of ABDA moved its headquarters from Lembang to Bandoeng when it became clear that the former place lacked sufficient accommodation. This made cooperation between air and naval forces difficult.

The first notable success for forces under ABDACOM was the U.S. Navy's attack at Balikpapan, Borneo, on January 24, which cost the Japanese six transport ships, but had little effect on them capturing the prized oil wells of Borneo.

The governments of Australia, the Netherlands and New Zealand lobbied Winston Churchill for an Allied inter-governmental war council, with overall responsibility for the Allied war effort in Asia and the Pacific, based in Washington, D.C. A Far Eastern Council (later known as the Pacific War Council) was established in London on February 9, with a corresponding staff council in Washington. However, the smaller powers continued to push for a body based in the United States.

== Collapse and dissolution ==
In the meantime, the rapid collapse of Allied resistance to Japanese attacks in Malaya, Singapore, the Dutch East Indies, the Philippines and other countries had soon overwhelmed the Malay Barrier. The fall of Singapore on 15 February dislocated the ABDA command, which was dissolved a week later.

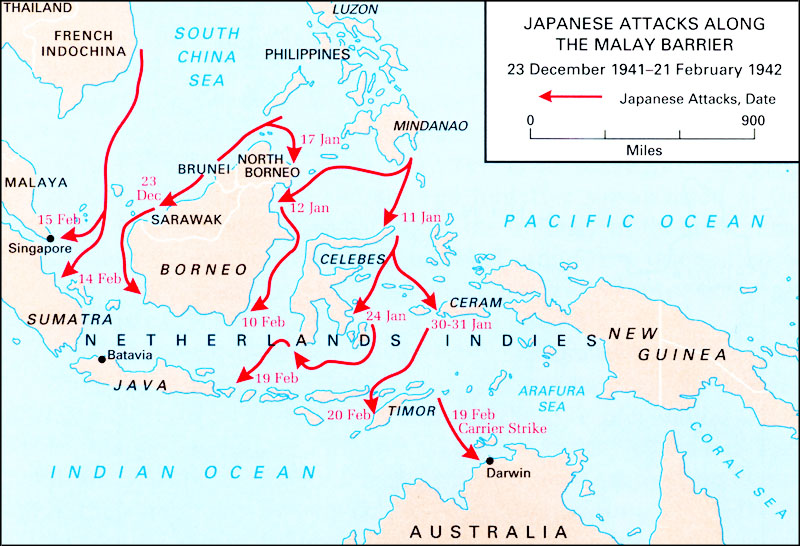
Japanese attacks along the Malay Barrier December 23, 1941 – February 21, 1942.

Wavell resigned as supreme commander on 25 February 1942, handing control of the ABDA Area to local commanders. He also recommended the establishment of two Allied commands to replace ABDACOM: a south west Pacific command, and one based in India. In anticipation of this, Wavell had handed control of Burma to the British Indian Army and reassumed his previous position, as Commander-in-Chief India.

Following the destruction of the ABDA strike force under Rear-Admiral Karel Doorman at the Battle of the Java Sea, in February–March 1942, ABDA effectively ceased to exist.

As the Imperial Japanese Army closed in on the remaining Allied forces in the Philippines, MacArthur was ordered to relocate to Australia. On 17 March, the U.S. government appointed him as Supreme Allied Commander South West Pacific Area, a command which included Australia and New Guinea in addition to Japanese-held areas. The rest of the geographic area of the Pacific Theater of Operations remained under the Pacific Ocean Areas command, led by Commander-in-Chief Admiral Chester Nimitz of the U.S. Navy.

The inter-governmental Pacific War Council was established in Washington on 1 April, but remained largely ineffectual due to the overwhelming predominance of U.S. forces in the Pacific theater throughout the war.

Perhaps the most notable success for ABDA forces was the guerilla campaign in Timor, waged by Australian and Dutch infantry for almost 12 months after Japanese landings there on February 19.

== Official command structure ==
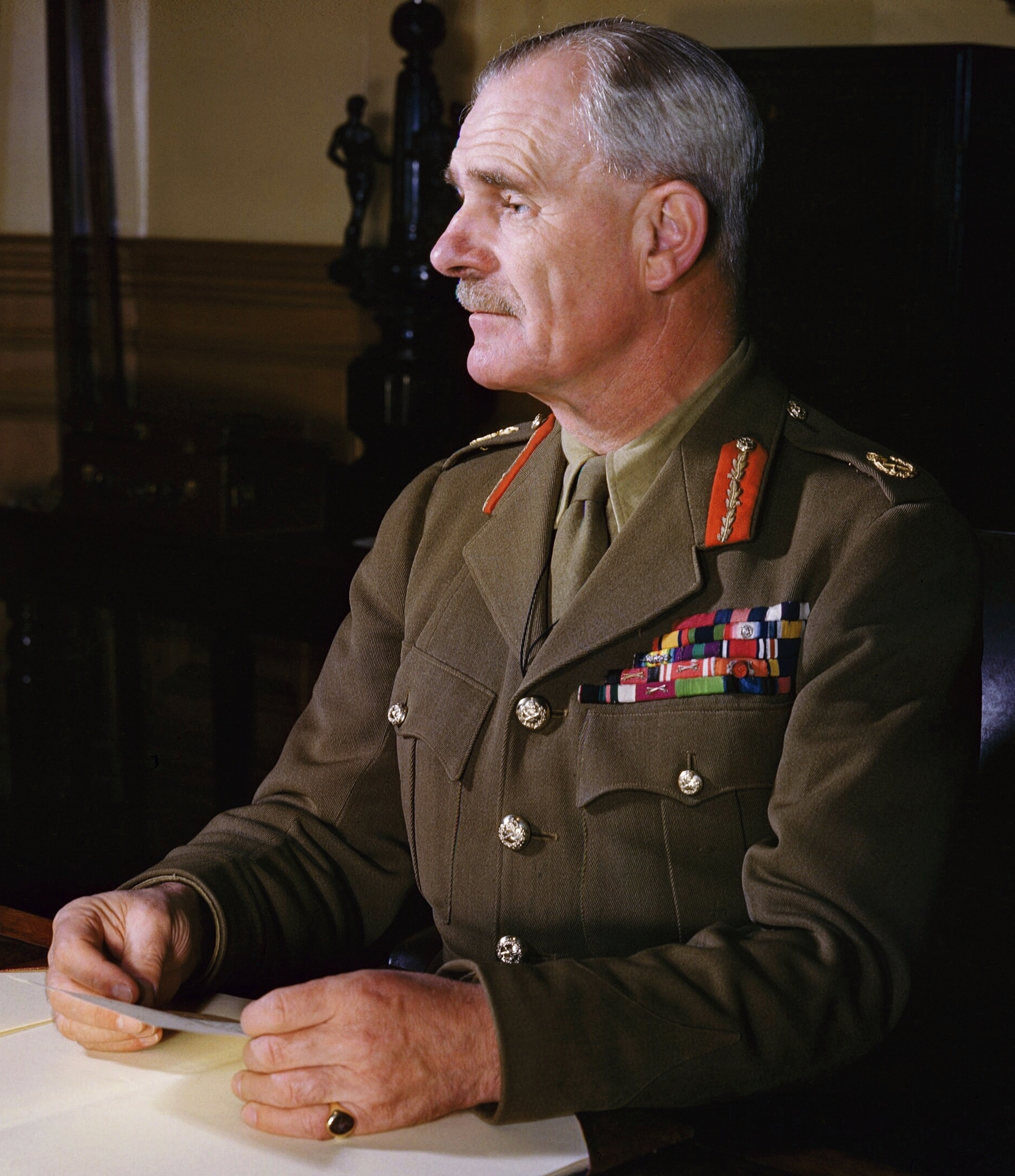
General Sir Archibald Wavell.

General Sir Archibald Wavell, British Army (BA) – Supreme Commander

- Lieutenant General George H. Brett, U.S. Army Air Forces (USAAF) – Deputy Commander
- Lt Gen. Henry Pownall (BA) – Chief of Staff

Land forces (ABDARM)

- Lt Gen. Hein ter Poorten, Royal Netherlands East Indies Army (KNIL) – commander of land forces (ABDA Land); also in direct command of Dutch East Indies land forces
  - Major General Ian Playfair (BA) – deputy land commander and chief of staff, land forces
  - Maj. Gen. T. J. Hutton (BA) – General Officer Commanding, Burma Command
  - Maj. Gen. David Blake, Australian Army, Australian 7th Military District (Northern Australia)
  - Lt Gen. Arthur Percival (BA) – Malaya Command
- Gen. Douglas MacArthur, United States Army – Allied forces in the Philippines

(MacArthur was technically subordinate to Wavell, but in reality, many of the chains of command shown here operated independently of ABDACOM and/or existed only on paper.)

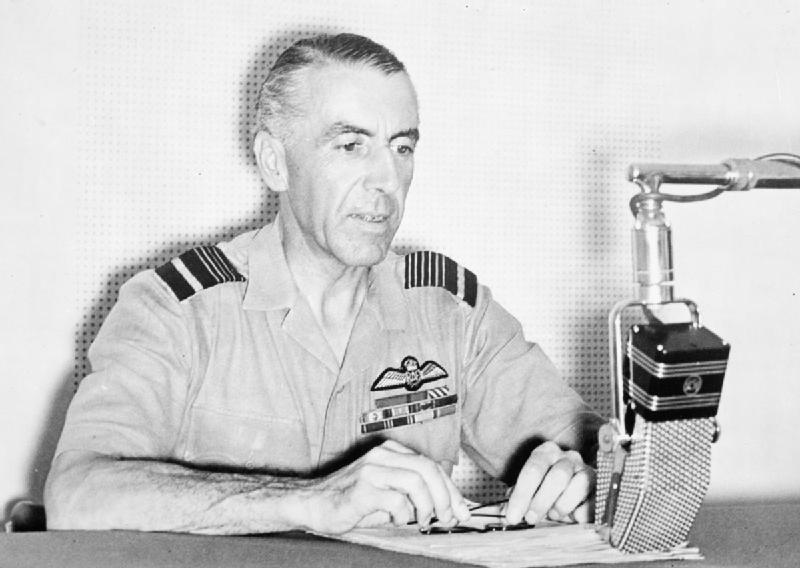
Air Marshal Sir Richard Peirse.

Air forces (ABDAIR)

- Air Marshal Sir Richard Peirse, Royal Air Force (RAF), commander of air forces (ABDA Air)
  - Maj. Gen. Lewis H. Brereton (USAAF), deputy commander air forces
    - Air Vice-Marshal Sir Paul Copeland Maltby RAF, Air Officer Commanding RAF in Java
    - Air Vice-Marshal D. F. Stevenson RAF, NORGROUP (RAF: Burma)
    - Air V. Marshal C. W. Pulford RAF, WESGROUP (RAF: Malaya and North Sumatra)
    - ? CENGROUP (KNIL: South Sumatra and West Java; merged with EASGROUP on 22 February 1942)
    - ? EASGROUP (USAAF: East Java; merged with CENGROUP on 22 February 1942)
    - Maj. Gen. Ludolph van Oyen (sometimes van Oijen) Royal Netherlands East Indies Army Air Force (KNIL), Allied Air Forces Java after February 22.
    - RECGROUP (air reconnaissance group) Kapitein ter Zee G. G. Bozuwa Royal Netherlands Navy
      - (deputy) Captain Frank D. Wagner, USN (flying boat reconnaissance units: Marineluchtvaartdienst (MLD); Patrol Wing 10, US Navy; No. 205 Squadron RAF)
    - Air Commodore D. E. L. Wilson, Royal Australian Air Force, AUSGROUP (RAAF: North-Western Australia, Molucca Sea & Dutch New Guinea)

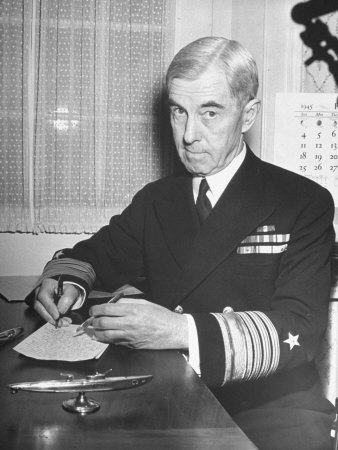
Admiral Thomas C. Hart.

Naval forces (ABDAFLOAT)

- Admiral Thomas C. Hart, U.S. Navy (USN) commander of naval forces (ABDA Sea). Until 12 February 1942.
- Adm. Conrad Helfrich, Royal Netherlands Navy (RNN) After 12 February 1942.
  - Rear Admiral Arthur Palliser, (British) Royal Navy, deputy commander naval forces
    - R. Adm. William A. Glassford, Jr. (USN) commander U.S. naval forces
    - R. Adm. Johan van Staveren (RNN) commander Dutch naval forces
    - Commodore John Collins, Royal Australian Navy, commander British-Australian naval forces

== Allied ships that served under the command ==
=== American ===
- USS Houston (CA-30) – lost
- USS Marblehead (CL-12) – heavily damaged
- USS Boise (CL-47) – heavily damaged
- USS Alden (DD-211)
- USS Barker (DD-213)
- USS John D. Edwards (DD-216)
- USS Whipple (DD-217)
- USS Parrott (DD-218)
- USS Edsall (DD-219) – lost
- USS Bulmer (DD-222)
- USS Stewart (DD-224) – lost
- USS Pope (DD-225) – lost
- USS Peary (DD-226) – lost
- USS Pillsbury (DD-227) – lost
- USS John D. Ford (DD-228)
- USS Paul Jones (DD-230)
- USS Asheville (PG-21) – lost
- USS Tulsa (PG-22)
- USS Holland (AS-3)
- USS Canopus (AS-9) – lost
- USS Otus (AS-20)
- USS Langley (CV-1) – lost
- USS Childs (AVD-1)
- USS Heron (AVP-2)
- Lanikai (converted yacht)
- USS Pecos (AO-6) – lost

=== British ===
- HMS Prince of Wales – lost
- HMS Repulse – lost
- HMS Exeter – lost
- HMS Dragon
- HMS Danae
- HMS Durban
- HMS Emerald
- HMS Electra – lost
- HMS Encounter – lost
- HMS Express
- HMS Isis
- HMS Jupiter – lost
- HMS Scout (1918)
- HMS Stronghold – lost
- HMS Tenedos – lost
- HMS Thanet – lost

=== Dutch ===
- HNLMS De Ruyter (1935) – lost
- HNLMS Tromp (1937) – heavily damaged
- HNLMS Java (1921) – lost
- HNLMS De Zeven Provinciën (1909) – lost
- HNLMS Evertsen (1926) – lost
- HNLMS Kortenaer (1927) – lost
- HNLMS Piet Hein (1927) – lost
- HNLMS Van Ghent (1926) – lost
- HNLMS Banckert (1929) – lost but later raised by Japanese forces
- HNLMS Van Nes (1930) – lost
- HNLMS Witte de With (1928) – lost

=== Australian ===
- HMAS Perth (D29) – lost
- HMAS Hobart (D63)
- HMAS Adelaide (1918)
- HMAS Vampire (D68) (ex. HMS Vampire) – lost
- HMAS Vendetta (D69)

== See also ==
- South East Asia Command
- South-East Asian Theatre

== General references ==
- Morison, S. E. History of United States Naval Operations in World War II. Volume III: The Rising Sun in the Pacific. Little, Brown, and Company, 1948.
- Willmot, H. P. Empires in the Balance: Japanese and Allied Pacific Strategies to April 1942. Annapolis: Naval Institute Press, 1982.
