= Pacific War Council =

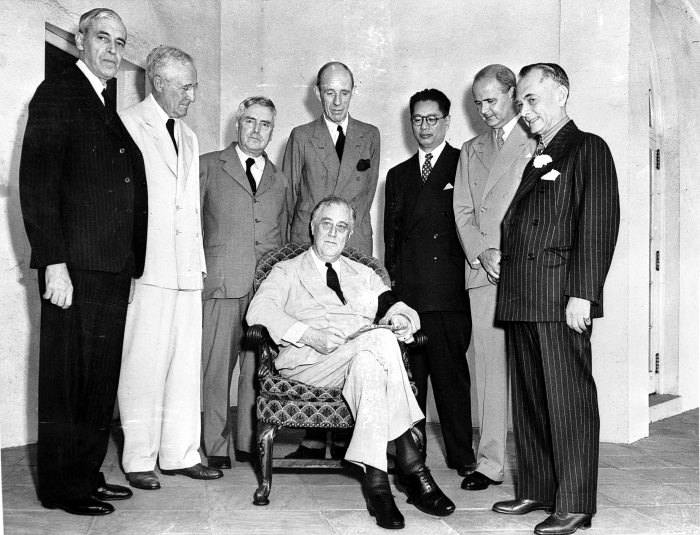
The council as photographed on 12 October 1942. Pictured are Franklin D. Roosevelt (seated), and standing, from left to right, Owen Dixon (Australian Ambassador), Leighton McCarthy (Canadian Ambassador), Walter Nash (New Zealand Minister), Viscount Halifax (British Ambassador), T. V. Soong (Chinese Minister of Foreign Affairs), Alexander Loudon (Dutch Ambassador), and Manuel L. Quezon (President of the Philippines). K. S. Digvijaysinhji of India was not included in the photo.

The Pacific War Council was an inter-governmental body established in 1942 and intended to control the Allied war effort in the Pacific and Asian campaigns of World War II.

Following the establishment of the short-lived American-British-Dutch-Australian military command (ABDACOM) in January 1942, the governments of Australia, the Netherlands and New Zealand began to push Winston Churchill for an inter-governmental war council based in Washington D.C. The Far Eastern Council was established in London on February 9, with a corresponding staff council in Washington. However, the smaller powers continued to push for a Washington-based body.

The Pacific War Council was formed in Washington on April 1, 1942, with a membership consisting of President Franklin D. Roosevelt, his key advisor Harry Hopkins, and representatives from Britain, China, Australia, New Zealand, the Netherlands, and Canada. Representatives from India and the Philippines were later added.

Australia and New Zealand (Prime Ministers John Curtin and Peter Fraser) wanted a council which was responsible for higher direction of the Pacific War; the London Council (Far East Council) was purely advisory and subordinate. Roosevelt wanted to retain the current arrangements for British-American collaboration, and suggested that where the interests of the three countries (Australia, the Dutch East Indies and New Zealand) were involved they could attend meetings of the Combined Chiefs of Staff in Washington (CCOS) and give their views on the spot. In return, the United States undertook the establishment of close working arrangements with the three military missions so they could give informed advice. Both Australia and New Zealand accepted under protest.

Much of the impetus for the council was lost during the collapse of ABDACOM, in March and April. The council never had any direct operational control and any decisions it made were referred to the US-British Combined Chiefs of Staff, which was also in Washington. Although there were relatively few US forces in the Pacific in mid-1942, the sheer volume of matériel and forces controlled by the United States government soon gave it effective control of strategy in the Pacific War.
