= Oliver Gordon (Royal Navy officer) =

Captain Oliver Loudon Gordon MVO RN (26 Jan 1896 – 30 Jan 1973) was in command of the heavy cruiser HMS Exeter from 11 March 1941 until she was sunk in the Second Battle of the Java Sea on 1 March 1942.

He later wrote of his experiences both in command of the Exeter and as a prisoner of war in Japan in the book Fight It Out, published in 1957.
