= Conrad Helfrich =

Royal Netherlands Navy officer

Conrad Emil Lambert Helfrich
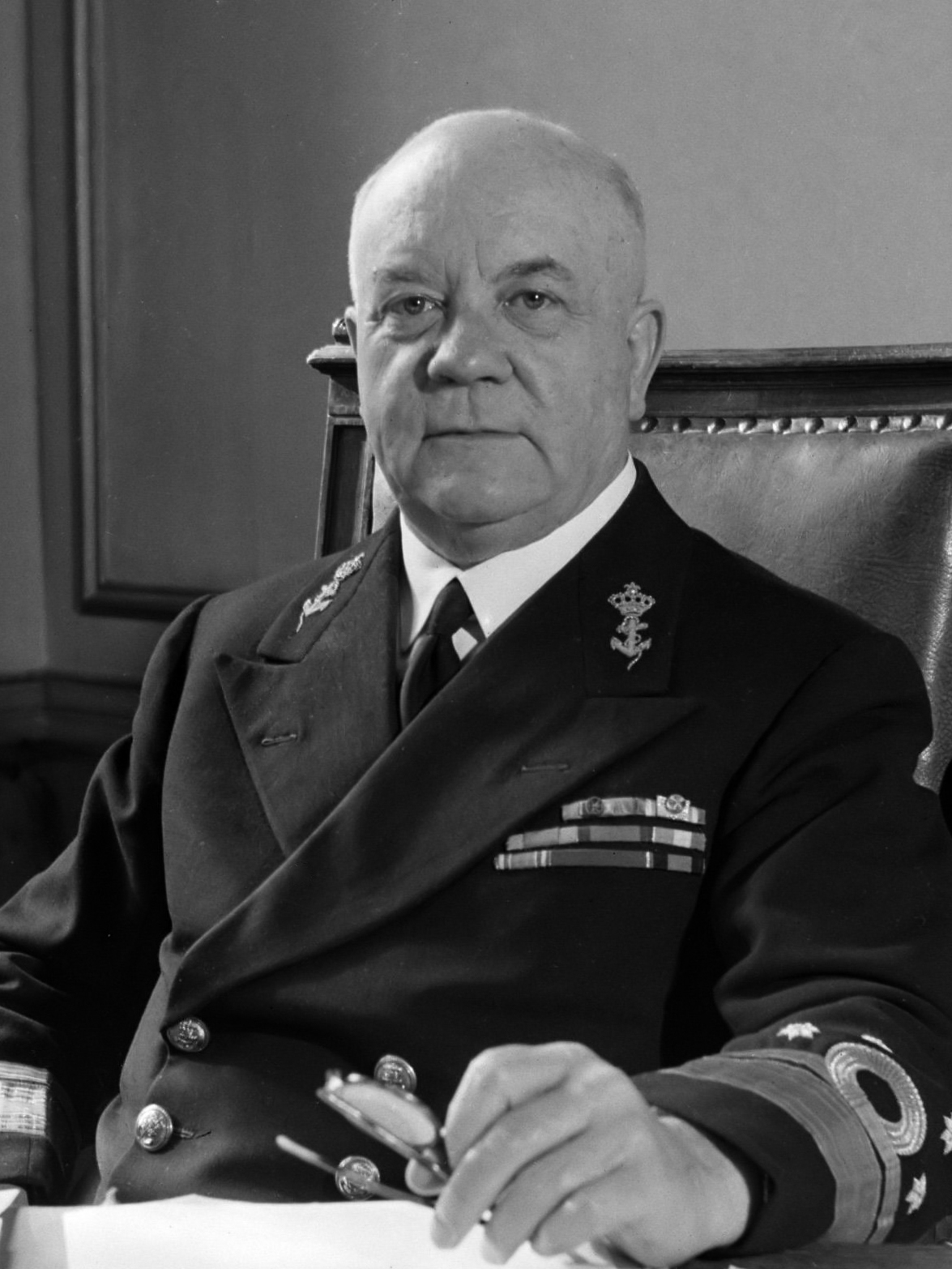
- Helfrich in 1946
- Born: 11 October 1886; Semarang, Dutch East Indies
- Died: 20 September 1962 (aged 75); The Hague, Netherlands
- Military career
- Allegiance: Netherlands
- Branch: Royal Netherlands Navy
- Service years: 1903–1948
- Rank: Lieutenant admiral
- Nickname: Ship a day Helfrich
- Commands: ABDAFLOAT
- Conflicts: World War II; Dutch East Indies Campaign; Indonesian National Revolution
- Awards: Knight Grand Cross of the Order of the Netherlands Lion; Commander of the Order of Orange-Nassau; Knight Commander of the Order of the Bath (United Kingdom); Silver Cross of the Virtuti Militari (Poland)

Lieutenant-Admiral Conrad Emil Lambert Helfrich (11 October 1886 – 20 September 1962) was a Royal Netherlands Navy officer who served in World War II.

== World War II ==
Helfrich was appointed overall commander of all forces in the Dutch East Indies in October 1939. At the outbreak of the war in the Pacific he gave instructions to wage war aggressively. His small force of submarines sank more Japanese ships in the first weeks of the war than the British and American navies combined, an exploit which earned him the nickname "Ship-a-day Helfrich". Admiral Helfrich worked tirelessly to establish co-operation with the Allied navies in the area since he knew that the Dutch could not hope to protect the Dutch East Indies by themselves.

=== Java Sea ===
When a combined naval command, comprising American, British, Dutch, and Australian forces (ABDA) was finally created in January 1942, Admiral Helfrich was bypassed for the post of Commander, Naval Forces, ABDA Command, in favour of the more senior Admiral Thomas C. Hart commanding the U.S. Asiatic Fleet of the United States Navy. Helfrich's mission to defend Java at all costs clashed with Hart's desire to conserve as many naval units as possible. On 12 February 1942, Helfrich succeeded Hart as commander of the ABDA naval forces in the Southwest Pacific and immediately went on the offensive. The courage of the "Striking Force" was to no avail in the face of the overwhelming superiority of the Japanese navy and after the disastrous Battle of the Java Sea, most of the ABDA ships under his command had been put out of action and ABDA itself was dismantled. Helfrich spent the remainder of the war in Ceylon preparing the return of Dutch colonial administration to the Dutch East Indies.

=== Japanese surrender ===
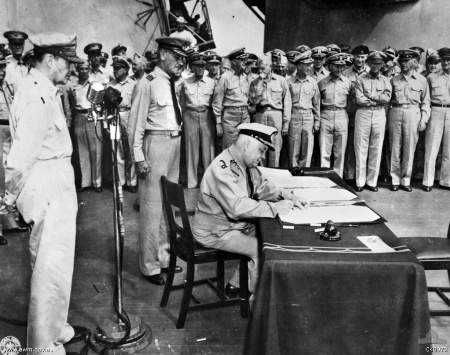
Tokyo Bay, Japan – Surrender of Japanese aboard USS Missouri. Lieutenant-Admiraal C.E.L. Helfrich, representing the Kingdom of the Netherlands, signs the instrument of surrender. He is being watched by a compatriot and by General Douglas MacArthur, Supreme Allied Commander, at the microphone.

In 1945, he was given command of all Dutch naval forces and promoted to lieutenant admiral. On 2 September 1945, he signed the Japanese Instrument of Surrender aboard the battleship USS Missouri on behalf of the Kingdom of the Netherlands.

Helfrich returned to the Dutch East Indies on 1 October 1945, where he commanded the Dutch forces in the Dutch East Indies until 24 January 1946 when the post of commander of the armed forces in the East was abolished. During that time, Commander Helfrich had to deal with the Indonesian struggle for independence. He was a fierce opponent of compromising with Sukarno and, supported by Chief of the General Staff Hendrik Johan Kruls, he objected to the Linggarjati Agreement of 15 December 1946, but without effect.

He remained in command until his retirement from the navy on 1 January 1949.

He wrote his memoirs which were published in 1950 and he died in The Hague, on 20 September 1962.

== Honours and awards ==
For his services during the World War, Helfrich received several awards. He was Commander of the Order of Orange-Nassau with Swords, Knight Grand Cross of the Order of the Netherlands Lion, Honorary Knight Commander of the Order of the Bath (UK) and awarded the Silver Cross (5th grade) of the Virtuti Militari (Poland). He had also received the Expedition Cross.
