= USS Otus =

Tender of the United States Navy

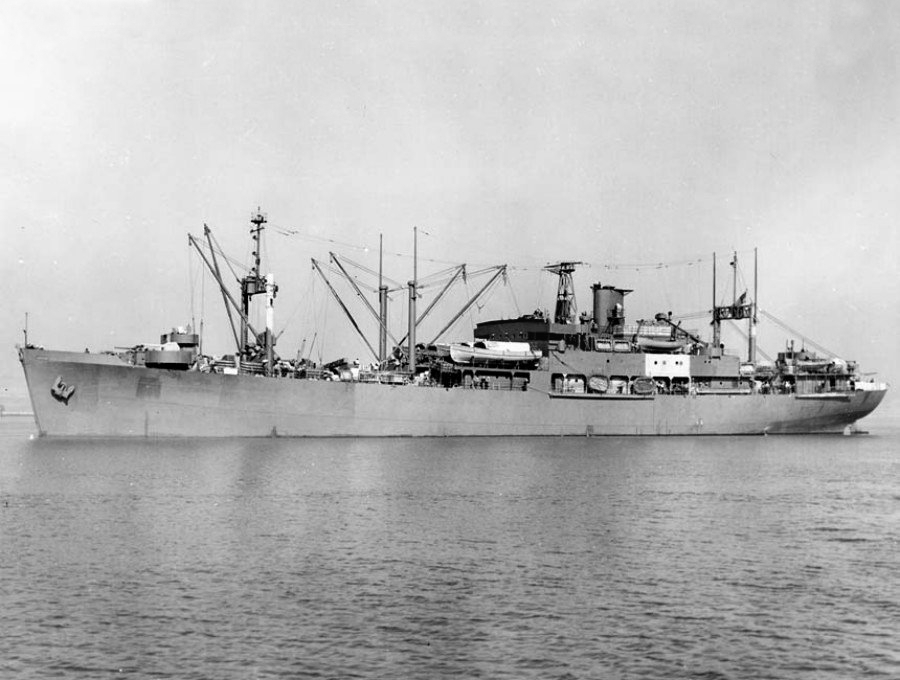
- USS Otus on 15 January 1943

History

United States
- Name: Fred Morris (1940-1941); Otus (1941-1946)
- Builder: Federal Shipbuilding and Drydock Company, Kearny, New Jersey
- Yard number: 175
- Laid down: 3 June 1940
- Launched: 2 November 1940
- Acquired: 27 December 1940 (delivered to Lykes Brothers Steamship Company); 1 March 1941 (Navy)
- Commissioned: 19 March 1941, as USS Otus (AS–20)
- Decommissioned: 20 August 1946
- Reclassified: ARG–20 (Repair Ship, Internal Combustion Engines), 25 June 1945
- Stricken: 25 September 1946
- Honours and awards: 1 battle star (WWII)
- Fate: Scrapped 1970

General characteristics
- Type: Internal combustion engine repair ship
- Displacement: 5,775 long tons (5,868 t) light
- Length: 417 ft 9 in (127.33 m)
- Beam: 60 ft (18 m)
- Draft: 20 ft 2 in (6.15 m)
- Propulsion: De Laval steam turbine
- Speed: 15 knots (28 km/h; 17 mph)
- Complement: 644 officers and enlisted
- Armament: 2 × twin 4 in (100 mm) gun mounts

USS Otus (AS-20) was a submarine tender in service with the United States Navy from 1941 to 1946. In 1945, she was converted to an internal combustion engine repair ship and redesignated ARG-20. Decommissioned in 1946, she was scrapped in 1970.

== Construction ==
The ship was laid down under United States Maritime Commission (MC) Contract 3 June 1940 by the Federal Shipbuilding and Drydock Company of Kearny, New Jersey, MC hull 70, yard hull 175, and launched as Fred Morris on 2 November 1940, sponsored by Mrs. Fred Allain Morris. Fred Morris, official number 240200, was the fourth in a series of five identical ships (Joseph Lykes, Zoella Lykes, Reuben Tipton (Torpedoed/lost 1942), Fred Morris, and John Lykes) built for Lykes Brothers Steamship Company of New Orleans and delivered to the company on 27 December 1940 after successful trials for the MC and Lykes. The ship was intended for service between the U.S. Gulf ports and ports in United Kingdom and Mediterranean. To meet requirements for river and canal navigation, modifications were made for visibility on the bridge and masts were telescopic to meet Manchester Ship Canal height requirements. The ship was designed to accommodate a crew of eighteen deck department, sixteen engine department and nine in the steward's department for a total of forty-three crew with two owner's staterooms approximating liner cabins suitable for passengers.

Characteristics as built were 417 ft 9 in (127.3 m) length overall, 395 ft 0 in (120.4 m) length between perpendiculars, 60 ft (18.3 m) beam (molded), 27 ft 6 in (8.4 m) loaded draft, 6,863 GRT, 9,095 DWT, with a displacement of 12,875 tons. Propulsion was a De Laval steam turbine driving a bronze, variable-pitch, three-bladed propeller 17 ft 6 in (5.3 m) in diameter. Two 250 kW De Laval steam turbine generators provided electrical power.

The launch can be seen in stock footage used in the opening scenes of the 1964 film The Incredible Mr. Limpet.

== Navy acquisition ==
The Fred Morris was acquired by the Navy on 1 March 1941 and commissioned as USS Otus (AS–20) on 19 March 1941. The lone ship in her class, she was named for Otus, a mythological son of Iphimedia (wife of Aloeus) and Poseidon.

=== Submarine tender (1941-1945) ===
Assigned to the Asiatic Fleet as a submarine tender, she was anchored in Mariveles Bay, Philippine Islands, on 7 December 1941. On 10 December 1941 she was slightly damaged during the Japanese air raid on the Cavite Navy Yard, when several bombs landed near her starboard side. Not wanting to risk one of the few tenders in his command, Admiral Hart, Commander Asiatic Fleet ordered Otus to leave the Philippines.

Departing 10 December she arrived at Port Darwin, Australia on 28 December. Remaining at Port Darwin through January 1942 Otus steamed to Java and Trincomalee, Ceylon, during February and the first part of March. She returned to Australia on 10 March, where she tended submarines at Fremantle until departing for the United States on 25 July. Arriving Mare Island Naval Shipyard 24 August, Otus underwent an extensive overhaul until 23 January 1943. After a brief stop at Pearl Harbor, she returned to Australia 22 February where she remained, steaming from port to port as the demand for her services dictated, until 1 September. From September 1943 until December 1944 Otus served at four different sites in New Guinea furnishing tender services for escort vessels, minecraft, and amphibious craft as well as submarines.

Departing Hollandia Bay 25 December, Otus arrived at San Pedro Bay, Leyte Gulf, Philippines on 6 January 1945 and commenced providing routine upkeep and emergency repairs to the ships of the Southwest Pacific Area.

=== Repair ship (1945-1946) ===
On 25 June 1945 her classification was changed to ARG–20 (Repair Ship, Internal Combustion Engines). On 1 December 1945 Otus left San Pedro Bay en route to Portland, Oregon. Arriving 2 January 1946, she was assigned the duty of deactivating vessels. She carried out this work at both Portland and Astoria until 29 June 1946, when she steamed to Seattle to commence inactivation overhaul.

=== Decommissioning and fate ===
Otus decommissioned 20 August 1946 and was sold the following day. She was struck from the Naval Vessel Register 25 September 1946. In 1970 she was at Olympia, Washington with the National Defense Reserve Fleet. The ship was finally sold for scrap, 2 November 1970, to Zidell Explorations Inc. of Portland, OR.

Otus received one battle star for service in World War II.
